= Michael Groen =

U.S. Marine Corps general

Michael S. Groen
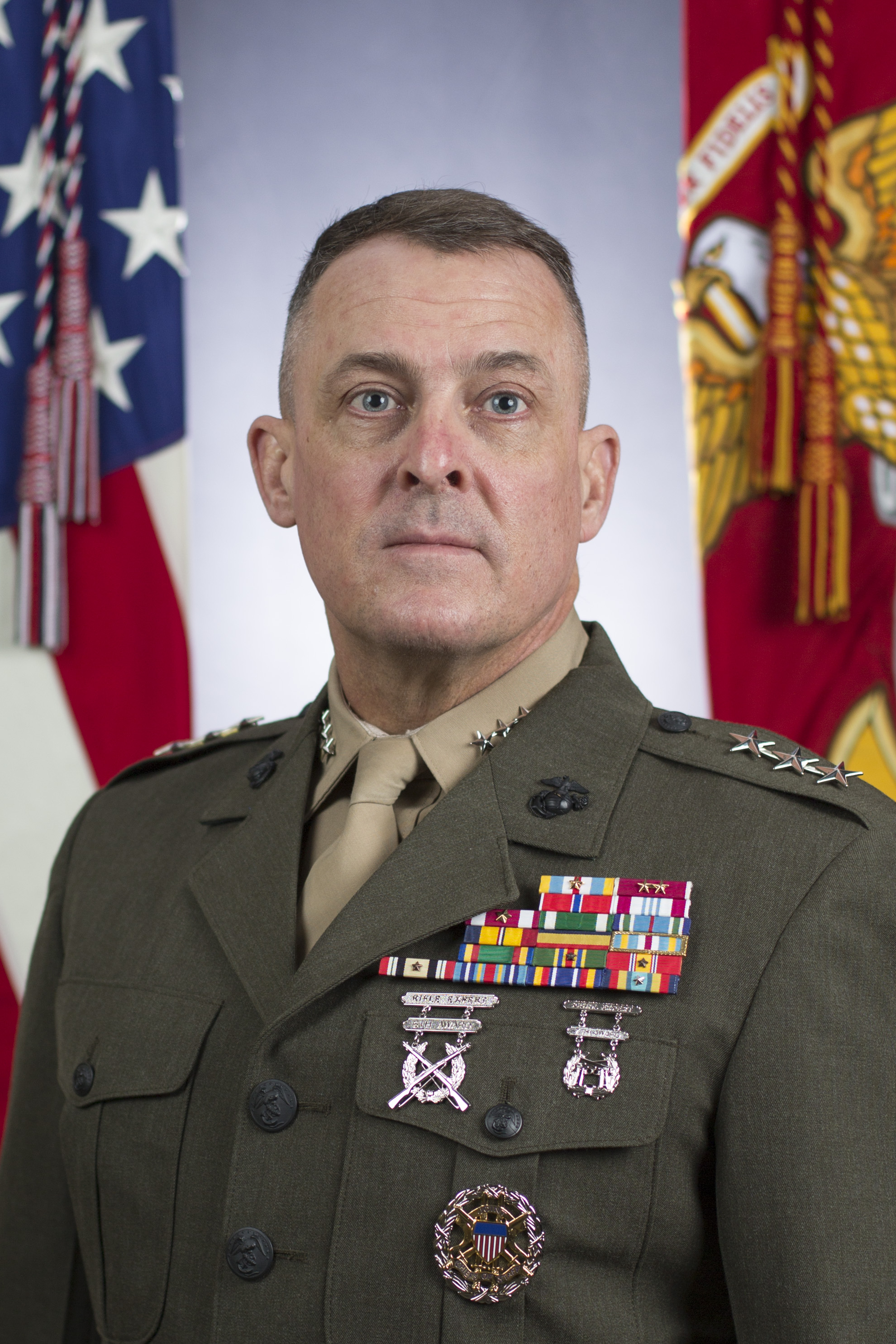
- Official portrait, 2022
- Born: Michigan, U.S.
- Military career
- Allegiance: United States
- Branch: United States Marine Corps
- Service years: c. 1986–2022
- Rank: Lieutenant General
- Commands: Joint Artificial Intelligence Center; 3rd Radio Battalion
- Conflicts: Iraq War
- Awards: Defense Superior Service Medal; Legion of Merit (3); Bronze Star Medal

Michael S. Groen is a retired United States Marine Corps lieutenant general who last served as the Commander of the Joint Artificial Intelligence Center. Previously, he was the Deputy Chief of Computer Network Operations of the National Security Agency.

== Early life and education ==
Groen is a 1986 graduate of Calvin College (now Calvin University) in Grand Rapids, Michigan. He attended the Naval Postgraduate School in Monterey, California, graduating with Master of Science degrees in Electrical Engineering and Applied Physics. He attended the Marine Air-Ground Task Force Intelligence Officer Course and was a distinguished graduate of the Marine Corps Command and Staff College.

Groen is a native of Michigan and is married with three sons.

== Military career ==
As a junior officer, Groen served in Camp Pendleton, California, and Okinawa, Japan with the 31st Marine Expeditionary Unit (MEU). In 2003 during Operation Iraqi Freedom I, Lieutenant Colonel Groen participated in combat operations as the 1st Marine Division’s Deputy G-2 and intelligence planner. Groen was further designated as the G-2 for Task Force Tripoli, operating in north-central Iraq. In 2004, Groen returned to Iraq as the 1st Marine Division G-2, where he was a principal in the redesign of Marine Intelligence. He was reassigned to United States European Command where he served as Chief of Intelligence Planning for Europe and Africa. There, he planned intelligence operations in the Balkans, Northern Iraq, Central Africa, and the Trans-Sahara region. He was instrumental in transitioning intelligence processes into the newly formed Joint Intelligence Operations Center (JIOC). In 2006, Groen assumed command of the 3rd Radio Battalion, Marine Corps Base Hawaii. During this time, the Battalion conducted its first deployment to the Southern Philippines in support of Operation Enduring Freedom-Philippines and continued its support to the 31st MEU. After command, he reported to the College of Naval Warfare, (Naval War College) in Newport, Rhode Island. While there, he was selected as the Marine Fellow for the Stockdale Group, assisting the United States Navy program to develop joint and operational leaders. Promoted to colonel, he graduated with distinction in June 2008. He assumed command of Headquarters Battalion, 1st Marine Division in Camp Pendleton, California. In 2010, he was given additional duties as the division’s Chief of Staff and the Commanding Officer for the 1st Marine Division (Rear).

In August 2010, Groen served under the Deputy Commandant for Combat Development and Integration. There, he led the Marine Corps' Amphibious Capabilities Working Group, which reviewed naval relationships, doctrine, concepts, and capabilities. In that capacity, he formed and served as the initial director of the "Ellis Group", refining concepts for naval power projection and expeditionary operations. He was reassigned as the Director of the Marine Corps Strategic Initiatives Group (SIG), directly supporting the Commandant and senior leadership for institutional and operational issues.

Selected for brigadier general, Groen was reassigned as the Director of Marine Corps Intelligence (DIRINT) in June 2013. As the DIRINT, he codified and advanced the implementation of the Marine Corps ISR Enterprise. He served as the Senior Service authority for SIGINT, HUMINT, GEOINT, counterintelligence, and special activities. In July 2017, he was promoted to major general and assumed the position of Director for Intelligence (J-2), Joint Staff. After his tour as J-2, Groen was assigned to the National Security Agency and served as the Deputy Chief of Computer Network Operations, leading this premier Computer Network Exploitation organization.

Groen assumed his current position as the Director, Joint Artificial Intelligence Center on 1 October 2020. As a member of the JAIC team, he leads the transformation of United States Joint warfighting and departmental processes through the integration of Artificial Intelligence.

Groen retired from the Marine Corps on May 19, 2022.

Groen's personal decorations include the Defense Superior Service Medal, Legion of Merit, the Bronze Star Medal, the Defense Meritorious Service Medal, and the Combat Action Ribbon.

Military offices
Preceded by Vincent R. Stewart	Director of Intelligence of the United States Marine Corps; 2013–2016	Succeeded by William H. Seely III
Preceded by James R. Marrs	Director of Intelligence of the Joint Staff; 2017–2019	Succeeded by Frank D. Whitworth
Preceded by Frank D. Whitworth	Deputy Chief of Computer Network Operations of the National Security Agency; 2019–2020	Succeeded by Jeffrey S. Scheidt
Preceded by Nand Mulchandani; Acting	Commander of the Joint Artificial Intelligence Center; 2020–2022	Vacant
