= MCIA =

MCIA can refer to:

- Ottawa Macdonald–Cartier International Airport
- Mactan–Cebu International Airport
- Marine Corps Intelligence Activity
- Mexico City International Airport
