= Alfred M. Gray Jr. =

United States Marine Corps general (1928–2024)

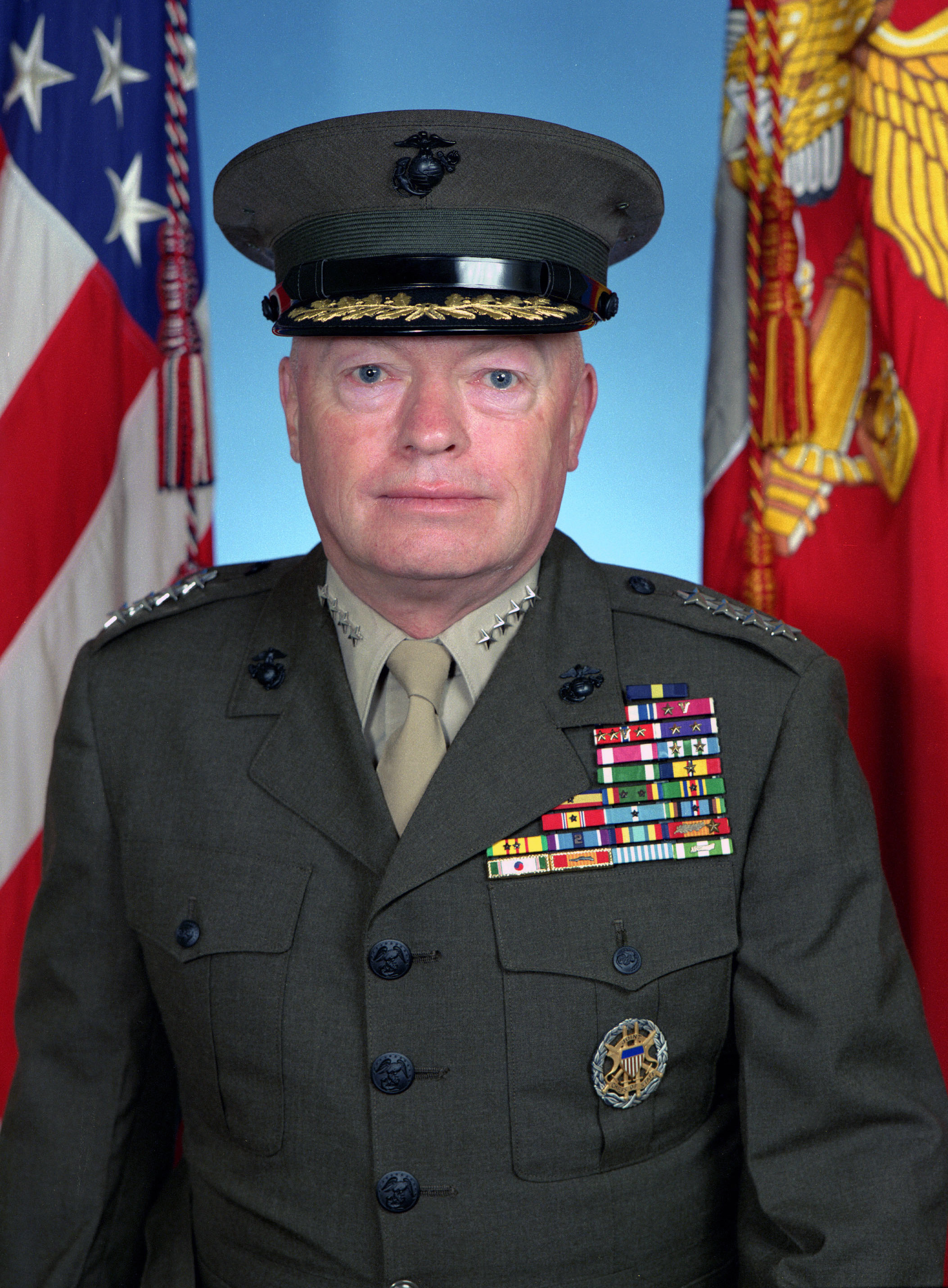
- Gray in 1994
- Born: June 22, 1928; Rahway, New Jersey, U.S.
- Died: March 20, 2024 (aged 95); Alexandria, Virginia, U.S.
- Burial place: Arlington National Cemetery
- Spouse: Jan Goss (1980–2020; her death)
- Military career
- Allegiance: United States
- Branch: United States Marine Corps
- Service years: 1950–1991
- Rank: General
- Commands: Commandant of the Marine Corps; Marine Forces Atlantic; II Marine Expeditionary Force; 2nd Marine Division; 33d Marine Amphibious Unit; 4th Marine Regiment; 2nd Marine Regiment; 1st Battalion, 2nd Marines; 1st Radio Battalion
- Conflicts: Korean War; Vietnam War
- Awards: Defense Distinguished Service Medal (2); Navy Distinguished Service Medal (2); Army Distinguished Service Medal; Air Force Distinguished Service Medal; Coast Guard Distinguished Service Medal; Silver Star; Legion of Merit (2); Bronze Star Medal (4); Purple Heart (3)

Alfred Mason Gray Jr. (June 22, 1928 – March 20, 2024) was a United States Marine Corps four-star general who served as the 29th commandant of the Marine Corps from July 1, 1987, until his retirement on June 30, 1991, after 41 years of service.

== Early life and education ==
Gray was born on June 22, 1928, in Rahway, New Jersey, the son of Emily and Alfred Mason Gray. The family moved to the Jersey Shore community of Point Pleasant Beach. He transferred from Rahway High School to Point Pleasant Beach High School, where he played baseball, basketball and football, graduating as part of the class of 1945.

Gray studied at Lafayette College and received a Bachelor of Science degree from State University of New York. He had honorary degrees from Lafayette College, Monmouth University, Norwich University, the National Defense Intelligence College, and Franklin University. He married the former Jan Goss of Burlington, Vermont, on July 20, 1980.

== Marine career ==
Gray enlisted in the United States Marine Corps in 1950. He served overseas with Fleet Marine Force (FMF), Pacific, attaining the rank of sergeant before being commissioned a second lieutenant in April 1952. His early tours included service with 11th Marines and 7th Marines, 1st Marine Division in Korea, the 8th Marine Regiment, 2nd Marine Division at Marine Corps Base Camp Lejeune, North Carolina, and Headquarters Marine Corps, Washington, D.C., during which he saw service in Guantanamo Bay and Vietnam.

Gray is considered the founder of Marine Cryptologic Support Battalion, although he never commanded the unit under that name. In 1955 Gray was tasked with forming Marine units to serve at Naval Security Group (NSG) sites. Gray commanded the Marine Detachment at NSG Kamiseya, Japan from 1956 to 1958.

In May 1964 he commanded the Signal Engineering Survey Unit, the radio detachment consisted of three officers and 27 enlisted men drawn from the 1st Radio Company, Fleet Marine Force, Pacific and from Headquarters Marine Corps supported by a 76-man infantry detachment from Company G, 2nd Battalion, 3rd Marines, which deployed to Danang Air Base, South Vietnam. The unit established communication facilities at Khe Sanh, Tiger Tooth Mountain (Dong Voi Mẹp) (16.768°N 106.713°E), Monkey Mountain and Bạch Mã. The unit left South Vietnam in mid-September 1964.

As a major, Gray joined the 12th Marine Regiment, 3rd Marine Division in South Vietnam in October 1965, serving concurrently as regimental communications officer, regimental training officer, and artillery aerial observer. He took command of the Composite Artillery Battalion and United States Free World Forces at Gio Linh in April 1967. In September, Gray was reassigned to the III Marine Amphibious Force in Da Nang where he commanded the 1st Radio Battalion elements throughout I Corps until February 1968. Following a brief tour in the United States, he returned to South Vietnam from June to September 1969 in conjunction with surveillance and reconnaissance matters in the I Corps area.

Gray then served as Commanding Officer of the 1st Battalion, 2nd Marines, Battalion Landing Team; Commanding Officer of the 2nd Marine Regiment from April 22, 1972, to December 27, 1972. Gray attended the Army War College, Carlisle Barracks, Pennsylvania from August 1973 to June 1974. He was next assigned as Commanding Officer of 4th Marines from July 30, 1974, to August 8, 1975. His follow on assignment was as Camp Commander of Camp Hansen, Okinawa, Japan. While commanding the 33rd Marine Amphibious Unit and Regimental Landing Team-4, and concurrently serving as Deputy Commander, 9th Marines Amphibious Brigade, Gray directed the Operation Frequent Wind evacuation of Saigon in April 1975. Advanced to brigadier general in March 1976, Gray served as Commanding General, Landing Force Training Command, Atlantic, and the 4th Marine Amphibious Brigade.

Promoted to major general in February 1980, he assumed command of the 2nd Marine Division, FMF, Atlantic, Camp Lejeune, North Carolina, in June 1981. While in the position, he was a confidant to then-Vice Admiral Arthur S. Moreau Jr., finding Marines for a covert team which targeted terrorists and drug traffickers. Gray relinquished command of 2nd MARDIV on August 28, 1984, to Major General Richard J. Murphy.

Following his promotion to lieutenant general on August 29, 1984, Gray was reassigned as Commanding General, FMF, Atlantic/Commanding General, II Marine Expeditionary Force, and Commanding General, FMF, Europe. Gray was promoted to general and became Commandant of the Marine Corps on July 1, 1987. His appointment as Commandant of the Marine Corps was recommended by Jim Webb, then Secretary of the Navy.

Gray presided over changes in training in the 1970s with an emphasis on large-scale maneuver in desert and cold-weather environments, and changed Marine doctrine to one of maneuver warfare in the 1980s. This transformation from the Vietnam War-era is sometimes called the second enlightenment of the Marine Corps (the first being under Major General John A. Lejeune), and included development of a robust maritime special operations capability, emphasis on the education of leaders, establishment of Marine Corps University, and development of a long-range desert operations capability. As a reminder that the primary role of every Marine is a rifleman, he had his official photograph taken in the Camouflage Utility Uniform, the only commandant to have done so.

=== Silver Star citation ===
Citation:

The President of the United States of America takes pleasure in presenting the Silver Star to Major Alfred Mason Gray, Jr. (MCSN: 0-56067), United States Marine Corps, for conspicuous gallantry and intrepidity in action while serving as Commanding Officer of the Composite Artillery Battalion, Twelfth Marines, THIRD Marine Division, in connection with operations against the enemy in the Republic of Vietnam. During the night of May 14, 1967, three Marines who were en route to a listening post northeast of the Gio Linh perimeter became confused in the darkness and unknowingly entered an area heavily mined with M-2 and M-16 mines. One of the Marines inadvertently detonated a mine which killed him and seriously wounded his comrades. Upon learning of the accident, Major Gray immediately proceeded to the area and, realizing that the casualties required immediate medical attention, unhesitatingly entered the mined area to assist them. Disregarding his own safety, Major Gray, accompanied by another Marine, calmly and skillfully probed a cleared path forty meters through the unmarked minefield to the side of the wounded men. Directing his companion to guide stretcher bearers along the cleared route, Major Gray moved one of the casualties away from a sensitized mine and began administering first aid to the injured Marines. When stretcher bearers arrived, he directed the safe evacuation of the casualties through the minefield. Subsequently, he maneuvered through the dangerous area to the side of the mortally wounded Marine and left the hazardous area only after he was assured that the man was dead. His timely and heroic actions in the face of great personal danger inspired all who served with him and were instrumental in saving the lives of two Marines. By his inspiring courage, bold initiative and selfless devotion to duty, Major Gray upheld the highest traditions of the Marine Corps and of the United States Naval Service.

== In popular culture ==
Gray appeared as himself on the Birthday Ball episode of Major Dad, a second-season episode that celebrated the 215th birthday of the Marine Corps. Appearing on 60 Minutes in the 1980s, he addressed the graduating class at the Naval Academy.

== Namesake ==
The Marine Corps Base in Quantico, Virginia, is the home of the Alfred M. Gray Research Center. The center houses the Marine Corps Archives and Special Collections, the Quantico Base Library, and the research library for the Marine Corps University, as well a conference center. Since 2004, as part of the Marine Corps Communications Awards Program, The General Alfred M. Gray Trophy is presented annually in honor of the 29th commandant. The award bears his name due to his contributions to modernization in intelligence and communications. The Marine Corps University Foundation retains overall responsibility for funding the Trophy, and receives a grant from Sprint. A Marine captain on active duty serving in the military occupational specialty (MOS) 0602 Communications Information Systems Officer within the operating forces or supporting establishment is recognized with the trophy each year at an awards ceremony.

== Awards and decorations ==

Defense Distinguished Service Medal w/ 1 bronze oak leaf cluster	Navy Distinguished Service Medal w/ 1 gold award star	Army Distinguished Service Medal	Air Force Distinguished Service Medal
Coast Guard Distinguished Service Medal	Silver Star	Legion of Merit w/ valor device & 1 award star	Bronze Star Medal w/ valor device & 3 award stars
Purple Heart w/ 2 award stars	Meritorious Service Medal	Joint Service Commendation Medal w/ 2 award stars	Navy and Marine Corps Commendation Medal
Combat Action Ribbon w/ 1 award star	Presidential Unit Citation w/ 1 service star	Navy Unit Commendation w/ 2 service stars	Meritorious Unit Commendation w/ 1 service star
National Defense Service Medal w/ 2 service stars	Korea Service Medal w/ 1 service star	Armed Forces Expeditionary Medal w/ 1 Service star	Vietnam Service Medal w/ 2 service stas
Humanitarian Service Medal w/ Award numeral 2	Sea Service Deployment Ribbon	Republic of Korea Presidential Unit Citation	Vietnam Gallantry Cross unit citation with Palm and star
Vietnam Civil Actions unit citation	United Nations Service Medal for Korea	Vietnam Campaign Medal	Republic of Korea War Service Medal
Office of the Joint Chiefs of Staff Identification Badge

In 1991, he was awarded the Distinguished Sea Service Award by the Naval Order of the United States.

== Later life ==
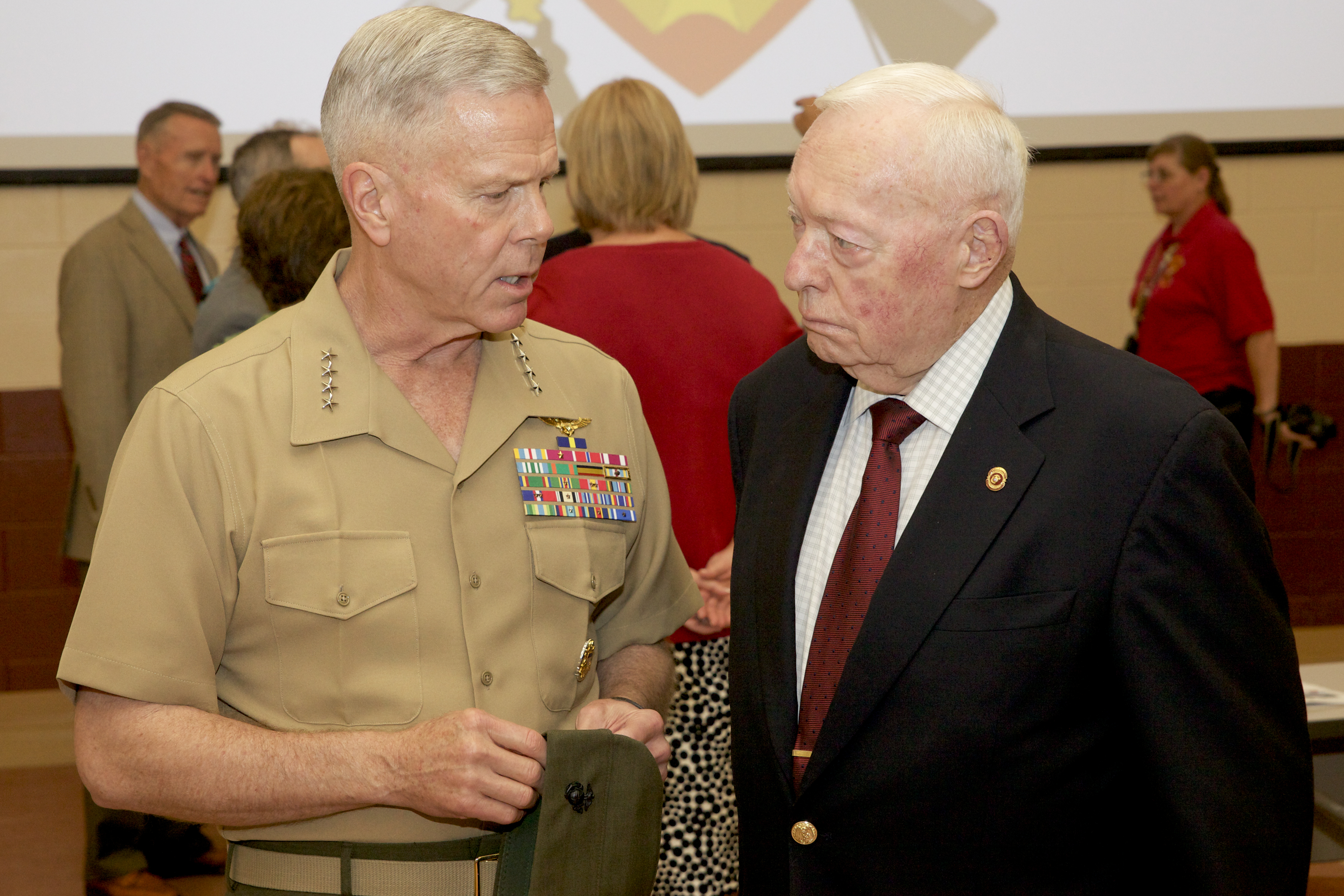
Alfred M. Gray (right) and James F. Amos (left) in June 2012.

Gray served on the board of directors or board of advisors of a number of companies, including:

- American Defense Systems, Inc. (since January 2008)
- American Public University System – serving as chairman emeritus and member, board of trustees,
- The Columbia Group, a privately held technical services support company that serves the U.S. military.
- GlobeSecNine, a privately held financial investment firm.
- Integrity Applications Inc., a privately held information assurance and security company.
- Potomac Institute for Policy Studies, a non-profit public policy research institute – serving as senior fellow and chairman of the board of regents
- Semper Fi Fund, a nonprofit that provides assistance to wounded and critically ill post-9/11 service members and their families (chairman of the board since its inception in 2004)
- SENSIS Corporation, a privately held commercial and defense radar company (since 2000)
- SYS Technologies, Inc., an information solution company
- Norwich University board of trustees.
- Defense Science Board Member https://dsb.cto.mil/docs/DSB-60yrs.pdf

Gray was a member of the 2nd Marine Division Association, Marine Corps Association, Khe Sanh Veterans, Inc., and the Marine Corps League.

Gray died at his home in Alexandria, Virginia, on March 20, 2024, at the age of 95. He was buried at Arlington National Cemetery on July 29, 2024.

== See also ==
- Marine Corps Intelligence Command

Military offices
Preceded by John H. Miller	Commanding General of Fleet Marine Force, Atlantic, Fleet Marine Force, Europe, and II Marine Expeditionary Force; 1984–1987	Succeeded by Clayton L. Comfort; Acting
Preceded by Paul X. Kelley	Commandant of the United States Marine Corps; 1987–1991	Succeeded by Carl E. Mundy Jr.
