= Melvin G. Carter =

U.S. Marine Corps general

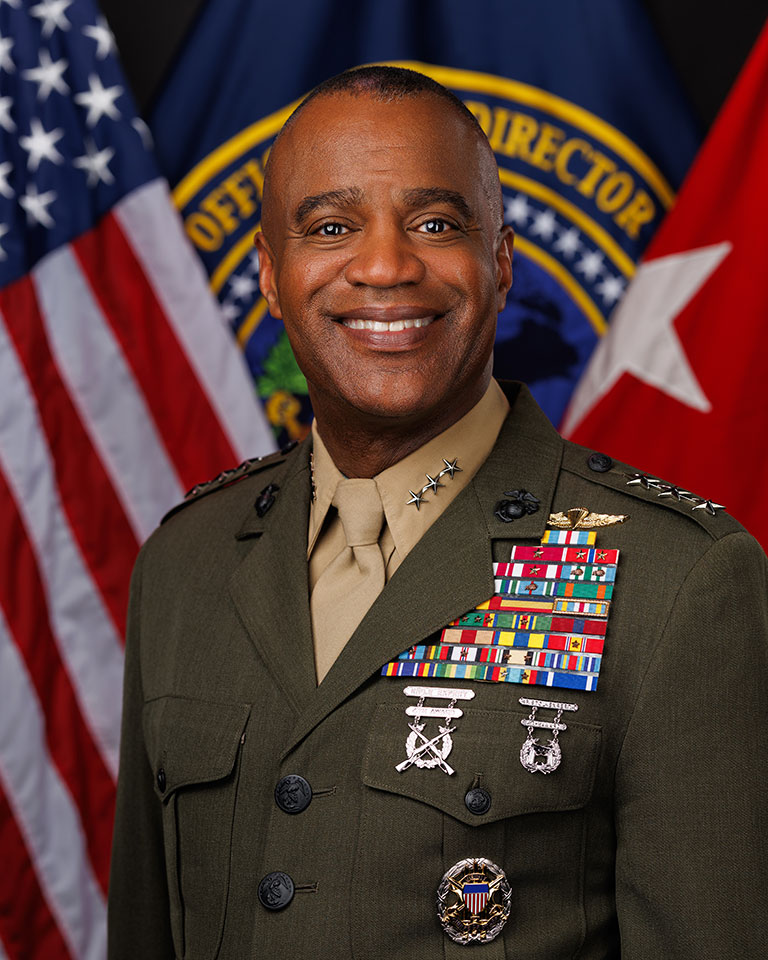
- Official portrait, 2026
- Born: c. 1965 (age 60–61); York, Pennsylvania, U.S.
- Military career
- Allegiance: United States
- Branch: United States Marine Corps
- Service years: 1985–present
- Rank: Lieutenant General
- Commands: Office of the Director of National Intelligence; Marine Corps Forces Strategic Command; Marine Corps Intelligence; 2nd Radio Battalion
- Conflicts: Operation Joint Endeavor; War in Afghanistan; Iraq War
- Awards: Defense Superior Service Medal; Legion of Merit (2); Bronze Star Medal (3)

Melvin G. Carter (born c. 1965) is a United States Marine Corps lieutenant general who has served as the deputy commandant for information, director of Marine Corps Intelligence, and commander of United States Marine Corps Forces Strategic Command since August 2024. He most recently served as the deputy director for combat support of the Cybersecurity Directorate of the National Security Agency. He previously served as the deputy chief for computer network operations of the NSA.

== Military career ==
While serving as an enlisted Marine in 1st Radio Battalion, Carter was awarded an NROTC Scholarship to attend Morehouse College in Atlanta, Georgia, and was commissioned as a second lieutenant in the United States Marine Corps upon graduating in 1992.

From 2008 to 2010, Carter served as Commanding Officer of 2nd Radio Battalion. From 2014 to 2016, then Colonel Carter served as Commanding Officer of the Marine Corps Intelligence Activity (MCIA). From 2010 to 2011, Carter served as the Commandant of the Marine Corps' National Security Fellow at the John F. Kennedy School of Government, Harvard University and, the Timothy T. Day Fellow at the Harvard Business School in 2016.

Carter was promoted to brigadier general on 9 August 2019 and initially served as the Director of Marine Corps Intelligence, Headquarters Marine Corps. Carter was nominated for promotion to major general in January 2024.

During his Marine Corps career Carter has served as a Marine Air Ground Task Force Intelligence Officer in Marine Corps units and as a joint intelligence officer during several tours with the Joint Special Operations Command. He has completed multiple tours overseas in combat zones to include Operation Joint Endeavor in Bosnia and Herzegovina, Operation Anaconda in Afghanistan during Operation Enduring Freedom, Operations Balkan Justice and Restore Freedom, and Operation Iraqi Freedom.

Military offices
Preceded by Dimitri Henry	Director of Intelligence of the United States Marine Corps; 2019–2021	Succeeded by William H. Seely III
Preceded by Heidi K. Berg	Director of Intelligence of the United States Africa Command; 2021–2023	Succeeded by Rose P. Keravuori
