= William H. Seely III =

United States Marine Corps general

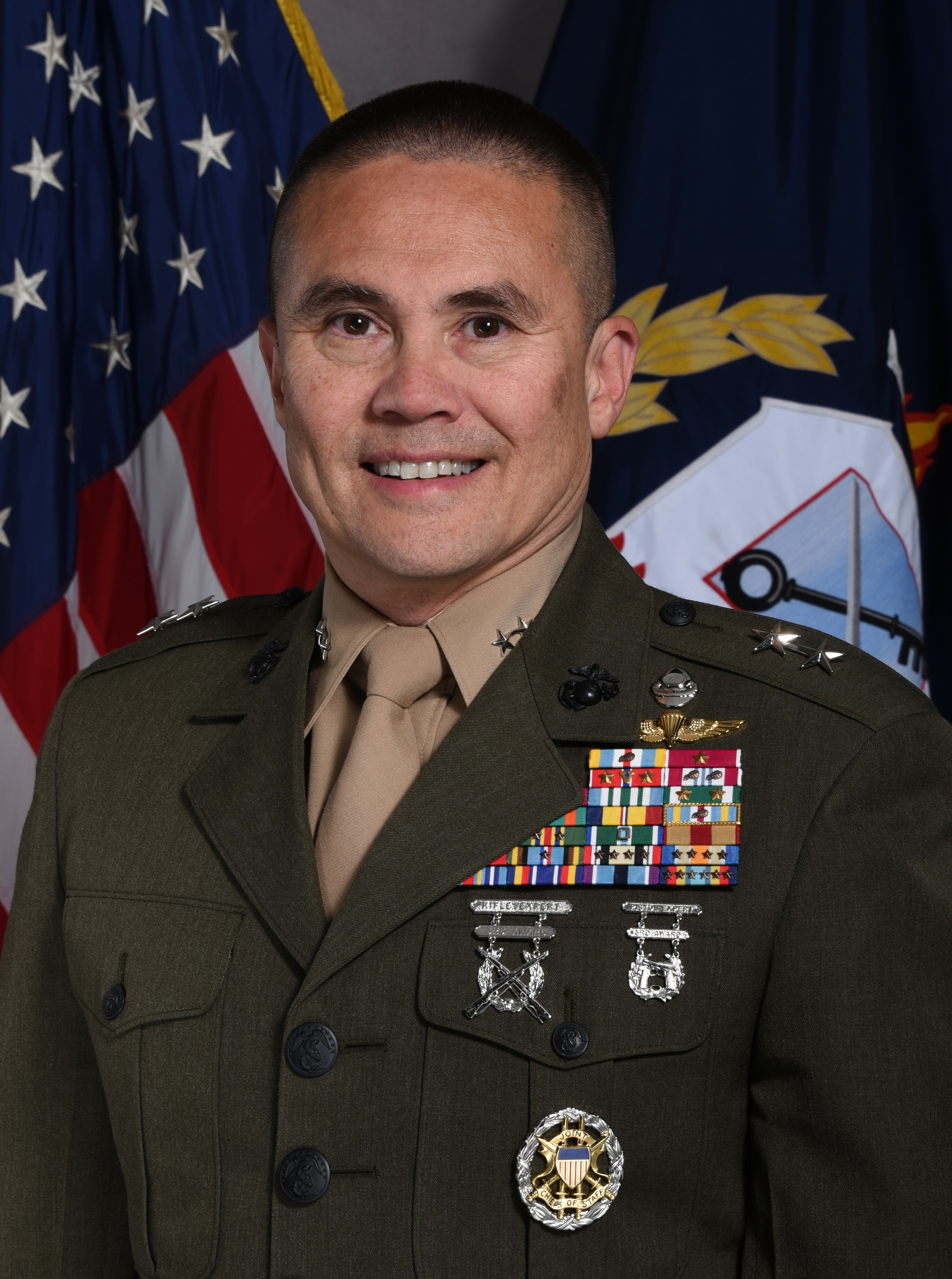
- Nickname: Bill
- Born: Saigon, South Vietnam
- Allegiance: United States of America
- Branch: United States Marine Corps
- Service years: 1989–2025
- Rank: Major General
- Commands: 3rd Reconnaissance Battalion; Marine Corps Intelligence
- Conflicts: Global War on Terrorism: Iraq War; War in Afghanistan

William H. Seely III is a retired major general in the United States Marine Corps who served as commandant of the Dwight D. Eisenhower School for National Security and Resource Strategy from July 2023 to April 2025. He most recently served as the Director of Marine Corps Intelligence from August 2021 to July 2023, and as the 35th Commandant of the Joint Forces Staff College from August 2020 to August 2021. In June 2024 he was named as the next commandant of the Virginia Tech Corps of Cadets. He took command on April 1, 2025.

== Education ==
He graduated with a bachelor's degree from American University, Washington D.C. and was commissioned through Naval Reserve Officers Training Corps (NROTC), George Washington University (1989). He earned a master's degree from Oklahoma State University, National Intelligence University, and the Naval War College with distinction.

== Military education ==
In 1989, he graduated from The Basic School in Quantico, Virginia.

In 1990, he graduated from the Basic Communication Officer Course in Quantico, Virginia.

In 1991, he graduated from United States Army Airborne School.

In 1992, he graduated from United States Navy SCUBA School.

In 1993, he graduated from MAGTF Intelligence Officers Course.

In 1994, he graduated from Weapons and Tactics Instructor Course.

In 1995, he graduated from the United States Army Military Intelligence Officer Advanced Course.

In 1996, he graduated from Amphibious Warfare School, Non-Resident Course.

In 1996, he graduated from Urban Reconnaissance Course.

In 2002, he graduated from United States Marine Corps Command and Staff College, Non-Resident Course (JPME-1).

In 2003, he graduated from Survival, Evasion, Resistance and Escape (SERE) School.

In 2005, he graduated from the Post-Graduate Intelligence Program DIA.

In 2010, he graduated from the College of Naval Warfare, Naval War College (JPME-II).

In 2014, he graduated from the Senior Planners Course at the Marine Corps University.

== Command ==
1990-1992: Communications Platoon Commander, H&S Company, 3rd Reconnaissance Battalion.

2000-2002: Company Commander, India Company, Marine Cryptologic Support Battalion, Kunia, Hawaii.

2006-2008: Battalion Commander, 3rd Reconnaissance Battalion, 3rd Marine Division.

2011-2013: Commander, Marine Corps Intelligence Schools, Training Command.

Jun 2016 - May 2017 - Director of Marine Corps Intelligence

2017 - 2019 - Marine Corps Director of Communication

2019 - 2020 - Commander, Task Force-Iraq (TF-Iraq), CJTF - Operation Inherent Resolve

Aug 2020 - Aug 2021 - Commandant of the Joint Forces Staff College (JFSC)

Aug 2021–Mar 2023 - Director of Marine Corps Intelligence

May 2023-Apr 2025 - Commandant of the Dwight D. Eisenhower School for National Security and Resource Strategy

== Post-Marine Corps Career ==
On 1 April 2025 Seely became Commandant of the Virginia Tech Corps of Cadets

Military offices
Preceded by Michael Groen	Director of Intelligence of the United States Marine Corps; 2016–2017	Succeeded by Dimitri Henry
Preceded by James F. Glynn	Director of Communication of the United States Marine Corps; 2017–2019	Succeeded by ???
Preceded by ???	Commander of Task Force–Iraq; 2019–2020	Succeeded by Ryan Rideout as Commander of the Military Advisor Group
Preceded by ???	Commandant of the Joint Forces Staff College; 2020–2021	Succeeded by Voris W. McBurnette
Preceded by Melvin G. Carter	Director of Intelligence of the United States Marine Corps; 2021–2023	Succeeded by Matthew Glavy
Preceded by Joy L. Curriera	Commandant of the Dwight D. Eisenhower School for National Security and Resource Strategy; 2023–2025	Vacant
