= Bankson T. Holcomb Jr. =

U.S. Marine Corps Brigadier General

Bankson Taylor Holcomb Jr.
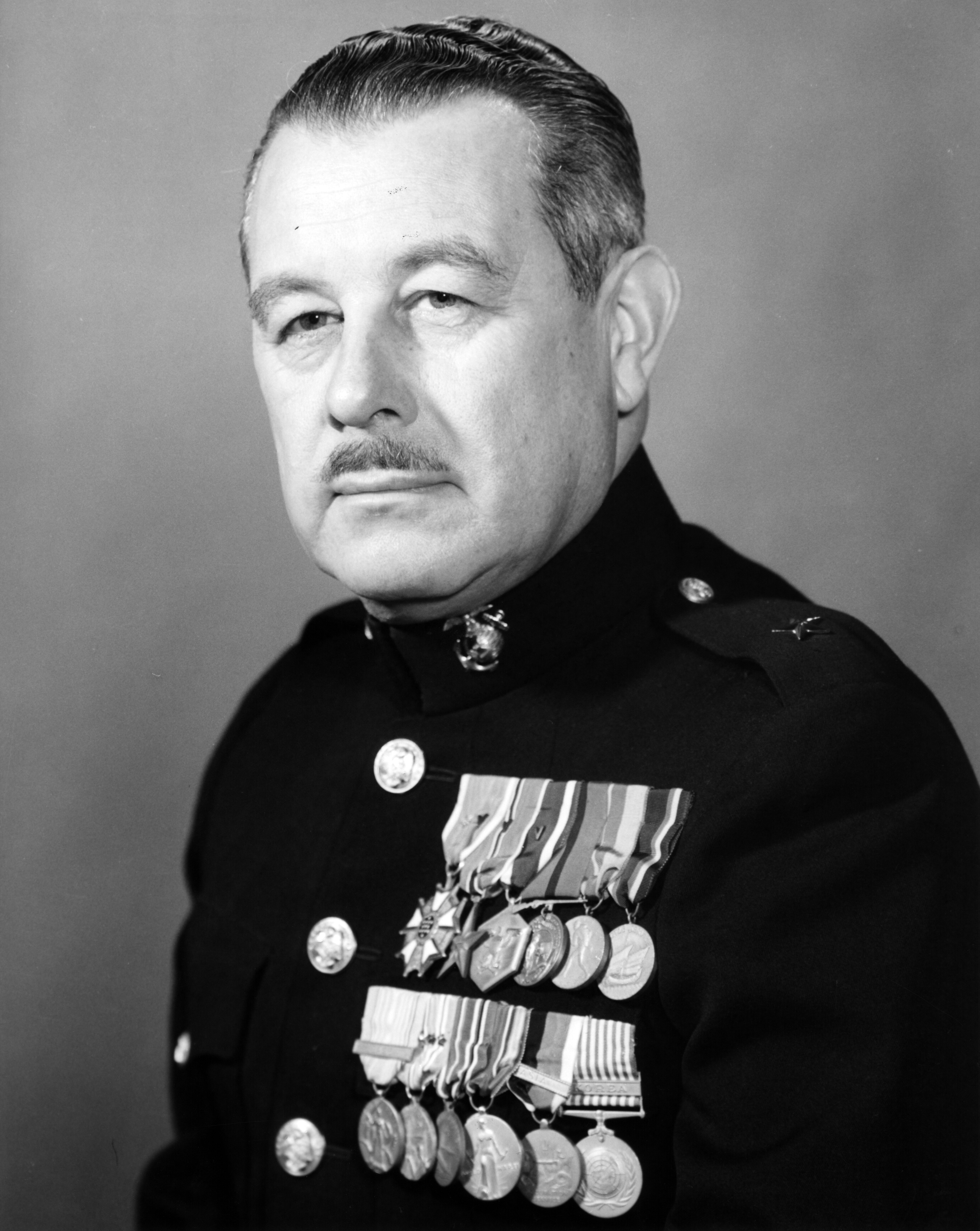
- Holcomb as Brigadier general, USMC
- Born: April 14, 1908; Wilmington, Delaware, U.S.
- Died: October 5, 2000 (aged 92); Inverness, Scotland
- Relatives: GEN Thomas Holcomb (cousin)
- Military career
- Allegiance: United States of America
- Branch: United States Marine Corps
- Service years: 1925–1959
- Rank: Brigadier general
- Nickname: "Banks" or "Chink"
- Service number: 0-4658
- Commands: Intelligence Section, HQMC; G-2 of 1st Marine Division; 5th Marine Regiment
- Conflicts: Yangtze Patrol; World War II; Attack on Pearl Harbor; Marshalls–Gilberts raids; China Defensive campaign; Battle of Iwo Jima; Battle of Okinawa; Korean War; Battle of Pusan Perimeter; Battle of Inchon; Battle of Chosin Reservoir
- Awards: Legion of Merit (2); Bronze Star Medal; Navy Commendation Medal

Bankson Taylor Holcomb III. (April 14, 1908 – October 5, 2000) was a decorated officer of the United States Marine Corps with the rank of brigadier general. He is most noted for his service as cryptanalyst and Linguist for Admirals Halsey and Spruance during the Pacific War or as Intelligence Officer of the 1st Marine Division during the Korean War. He was also a cousin of Commandant of the Marine Corps General Thomas Holcomb.

== Early career ==
Bankson T. Holcomb III. was born on April 14, 1908, in Wilmington, Delaware, the son of prominent insurance businessman Bankson T. Holcomb Jr. and his wife Julian Newton Holcomb. His family moved to China in 1921 and Bankson Jr. attended Peking (Beijing)Beijing American High School within the American Legation.

Following his 17th birthday, impressed by the local Marine detachment, Banks decided to enlist in the Marine Corps in April 1925. Holcomb served as an enlisted man for next six months and was decorated with the Marine Corps Good Conduct Medal for his service.

His superior recommended him for Naval Academy Preparatory School in San Diego, California. However Holcomb failed the Ancient history exam and was transferred to the private Virginia Preparatory School in Hampton Roads. He was successful the second time and was admitted to the United States Naval Academy in Annapolis, Maryland, in June 1927. Four years later, Holcomb graduated with the Class of 1931 and was commissioned a second lieutenant in the Marine Corps in June 1931. Because of his knowledge of Chinese language and interest in Orient, he was nicknamed "Chink" by his classmates. Banks was also active in the track, cross country running team, Gymkhana or was a member of radio club.

Following his graduation, Holcomb was sent to the Basic School within Marine Barracks Quantico, Virginia, for the Basic Officer Course. Holcomb graduated from the course and subsequently was assigned to the Marine barracks at the Philadelphia Navy Yard. He served in this assignment until the beginning of 1934, when he was transferred back to China. Holcomb was appointed platoon leader in the 4th Marine Regiment under Colonel John C. Beaumont and was stationed at Shanghai. While serving there, he was promoted to the rank of first lieutenant in November 1934 and subsequently assigned to the Chinese language advanced course at the American Embassy in Beijing.

Holcomb was transferred back to the United States in 1937 and assigned to Marine Barracks Quantico, where he was a company commander. He was promoted to the rank of captain in January 1939 and later transferred to Washington, D.C., where he was assigned to the Office of Naval Intelligence (ONI). Captain Holcomb was subsequently sent to Japan, where he was attached to the American Embassy in Tokyo. Holcomb's purpose for the Japanese service was aligned to the ONI advanced Japanese language and cultural program.

== World War II ==
Shortly before the Japanese attack on Pearl Harbor, Captain Holcomb was transferred to Hawaii and was assigned to Station Hypo, under the command of Commander Joseph Rochefort. As an experienced linguist, he translated enemy messages and performed intelligence work. Holcomb served in this capacity until early 1942, when he was assigned to the staff of Carrier Division 2 under the command of Vice Admiral William Halsey.

He and three radio operators were assigned to the aircraft carrier USS Enterprise to intercept and translate the enemy's radio traffic. Holcomb participated in the Marshalls–Gilberts raids at the beginning of February 1942 and, for his work during the raids and the Pearl Harbor attack, he was decorated with Navy Commendation Medal with Combat "V".

Holcomb subsequently returned to Station Hypo and received temporary promotion to major in May 1942. He served at Station Hypo until December 1942, when he was transferred to Chongqing, China, and appointed officer in charge of the communications and intelligence activities there. In this capacity, he also served as a member of the U.S. Naval Advisory Group and instructor for Kuomintang guerrillas. While in China, he was promoted to the rank of lieutenant colonel on March 1, 1943.

In 1944, Holcomb was transferred back to the United States and assigned to the ONI's OP-20-GZ, under the command of Commander Redfield B. Mason and worked as language officer on China/Japan Intelligence matters.

Lieutenant Colonel Holcomb returned to Pacific in the early 1945, when he was assigned as a radio intelligence and translation officer on the Task Force 58 staff under Admiral Raymond A. Spruance. He subsequently participated in the Battle of Iwo Jima and Battle of Okinawa with that command and was decorated with the Bronze Star Medal with Combat "V" for his distinguished work during the whole duration of the war, Holcomb was also decorated with the Legion of Merit with Combat "V".

== Later career ==
Following the surrender of Japan in August 1945, Holcomb participated in the occupation duties until 1948, when he was promoted to the rank of colonel, transferred back to the United States, and assigned to Marine Barracks, Norfolk Navy Yard as an intelligence officer. While stationed at Norfolk, Holcomb attended the Armed Forces Staff College and, after graduation in 1949, was transferred to Camp Pendleton, California, for a brief period as the temporary commanding officer of the 5th Marine Regiment on September 1, 1949. After one month, he was relieved by Colonel Victor H. Krulak and appointed as chief of staff, Fleet Marine Force Pacific at Guam.

When the Korean War broke out, Holcomb was transferred to the 1st Marine Division staff and appointed the Intelligence Officer (G-2) under Major General Oliver P. Smith. He participated in the Battle of Pusan Perimeter, the Battle of Inchon or Battle of Chosin Reservoir, and in the interrogation of Chinese prisoners of war, with whom he worked with in China during World War II. Holcomb was also decorated with his second Legion of Merit for his service as 1st Division's intelligence officer.

He was transferred back to United States due to illness in February 1951 and was sent to Bethesda Naval Hospital for recovery. After he was pronounced fit for duty, Holcomb was appointed assistant chief of staff and intelligence officer, Fleet Marine Force Atlantic. One of his final assignments was officer in charge of the Intelligence Section, Headquarters Marine Corps during the summer of 1957, before he retired in January 1959. He was advanced to the rank of brigadier general on the retired list for having been specially commended in combat.

== Retirement ==
Upon his retirement from the Marine Corps, Holcomb and his wife moved to Inverness, Scotland, where he was active in the Fleet Radio Unit Pacific veterans amateur unit. Holcomb was also later active in the supporting of Rear Admiral Edwin T. Layton's book And I Was There: Pearl Harbor and Midway – Breaking the Secrets.

Brigadier General Bankson T. Holcomb Jr. died on October 5, 2000.

== Decorations ==
Here is the ribbon bar of Brigadier General Bankson T. Holcomb:

1st row	Legion of Merit with Combat "V" and one 5/16" gold star	Bronze Star Medal with Combat "V"	Navy Commendation Medal with Combat "V"	
2nd row	Navy Presidential Unit Citation with one star	Marine Corps Good Conduct Medal	Marine Corps Expeditionary Medal	Yangtze Service Medal
3rd row	American Defense Service Medal with Base Clasp	Asiatic-Pacific Campaign Medal with seven 3/16 inch service stars	American Campaign Medal	World War II Victory Medal
4th row	Navy Occupation Service Medal	Korean Service Medal with three 3/16 inch service stars	National Defense Service Medal	United Nations Korea Medal

Military offices
Preceded by Robert E. Hommel	Officer in Charge of the Intelligence Section, HQMC; July 1957 – September 1957	Succeeded by James M. Masters, Sr.
