= Clyde D. Dean =

United States Marine Corps general

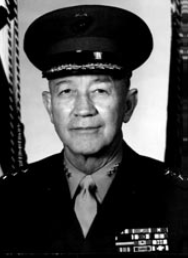
- Born: October 23, 1930; Little Rock, Arkansas, U.S.
- Died: December 23, 2001 (aged 71); Martinsburg, West Virginia, U.S.
- Burial place: Quantico National Cemetery
- Military career
- Allegiance: United States
- Branch: United States Marine Corps
- Service years: 1954–1987
- Rank: Lieutenant general
- Nickname: Dick
- Commands: Chief of Staff, HQMC; 1st Marine Division

Clyde Dixon Dean (October 23, 1930 – December 23, 2001) was a lieutenant general in the United States Marine Corps who served as Chief of Staff, Headquarters Marine Corps. He was commissioned in 1954 and retired in 1987.

Clyde D. Dean Dean graduated in 1954 from the U.S. Naval Academy, and was commissioned a second lieutenant in the Marine Corps. During the 1950s Dean served as a platoon commander of the 1st Amphibious Reconnaissance Company. During the Vietnam War, he served with the 2d Battalion, 9th Marines, and the 3d Battalion, 3d Marines. Following promotion to Brigadier General in 1979, Gen Dean served as the Director of Marine Corps Intelligence. In 1985 he assumed command of I Marine Expeditionary Force and 1st Marine Division. During his career LtGen Dean received the Bronze Star Medal with Combat “V” and the Purple Heart.
