= Marine Cryptologic Support Battalion =

Cryptology units of the U.S. Marine Corps

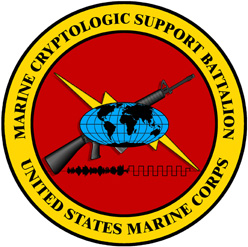
- Country: United States
- Allegiance: United States Armed Forces
- Branch: United States Marine Corps
- Type: Intelligence battalion
- Role: Military intelligence
- Garrison/HQ: Fort Meade

Commanders
- Commanding Officer: Lieutenant Colonel Anthony J. DeVuono
- Senior Enlisted Marine: Sergeant Major Michael J. Kliment

The Marine Cryptologic Support Battalion (MCSB) is a Marine Corps Intelligence battalion of the United States Marine Corps. The battalion headquarters are located in Fort George G. Meade, Maryland. In 2022 MCSB was re-subordinated to the Marine Corps Information Command (MARCOR INFOCOM), which was established on 1 October 2022.. Creation of MARFOR INFOCOM was directed by the Commandant of the Marine Corps in the May 2022 Annual Update to Force Design 2030.

== Mission ==
Under the operational control of the Director, National Security Agency/Chief, Central Security Service (DIRNSA/CHCSS) via the Marine Corps Service Cryptologic Component Chief, Marine Cryptologic Support Battalion trains, employs, and deploys Marines in order to conduct Signals Intelligence, Information Assurance, and National-Tactical Integration activities that satisfy NSA/CSS, Marine Air-Ground Task Force, and joint force intelligence requirements.

— Marine Cryptologic Support Battalion mission statement

The battalion's stated purpose is "to enable and execute Signals Intelligence, Information Assurance and National-Tactical Integration activities in order to satisfy NSA/CSS, Marine Air-Ground Task Force and joint force intelligence requirements."

== Organization ==
The Marine Cryptologic Support Battalion headquarters are located in Fort Meade, Maryland. The MCSB has seven companies, five of which are based in the contiguous United States, one in Hawaii, and one in England.

- Company A, Aurora, Colorado
- Company B, Fort Meade, Maryland
- Company D, Fort Gordon, Georgia
- Company G, RAF Menwith Hill, England (Company was shut down in Dec. 2013)
- Company H, San Antonio, Texas
- Company I, Schofield Barracks, Hawaii. Company I was established as "Company I, Marine Support Battalion" on September 1, 1962, and was stationed at the U.S. Naval Facility in Nicosia, Cyprus.
- Company L Fort Meade, Maryland. Company L is part of the Marine Corps Cyberspace Command.

== Notable veterans ==
General Alfred M. Gray Jr., who served as the 29th Commandant of the Marine Corps from July 1, 1987, until his retirement on June 30, 1991, is considered the founder of Marine Cryptologic Support Battalion, although he never commanded the unit under that name. In 1955 then Captain Gray was tasked with forming two units, one to be assigned to Europe and the other to the Pacific area, chosen from Marines undergoing Manual Morse intercept training at the Naval Security Group (NSG) training facility at Imperial Beach, California. These two units would form the nucleus of what is known today as Marine Cryptologic Support Battalion. Upon completion of the course at Imperial Beach, the Pacific team under his command reported for duty with the NSG at Kamiseya, Japan in May 1956. In 1958 then-Captain Gray was assigned to Hawaii to form and activate the 1st Radio Company, a tactical signals intelligence (SIGINT) unit, where he would serve from September 1958 to May 1961.

LtGen Vincent R. Stewart served as a company commander twice in MCSB, once at I Company when it was in Adak, Alaska, (1986–1988) and once at E Company when it was in Misawa Japan (1992–1994). LtGen Stewart served as Director of the Defense Intelligence Agency 2015–2017 and as Director Marine Corps Intelligence 2009–2013.

MajGen William H. Seely III served as the Company Commander, I Company, Kunia, Hawaii, from 2000–2002 during the Hainan Island incident. He went on to serve as Director Marine Corps Intelligence 2016–2017 and 2021–present.

MajGen Dimitri Henry served as the Commanding Officer, Co H, Marine Cryptologic Support Battalion, San Antonio, TX, from 2001–2004. He went on to serve as Director Marine Corps Intelligence 2017–2019.

LtCol Dewey G. "Guy" Jordan commanded MCSB from 2005–2007 and later served as the AC/S G-2 and C/S Marine Corps Forces Cyberspace Command (MARFORCYBER) from 2012–2014, retiring as a Colonel in 2014. He first served as a Defense Intelligence Senior Level (DISL) executive at CYBERCOM and DIA from 2015–2017. He has since served as a Defense Intelligence Senior Executive Service (DISES) executive at Headquarters U.S. Marine Corps (HQMC)as the Assistant Director of Marine Corps Intelligence and then at the National Security Agency (NSA) from October 2017 – present.

== See also ==
List of United States Marine Corps battalions
