= Marine Corps Intelligence =

Intelligence branch of the U.S. Marine Corps

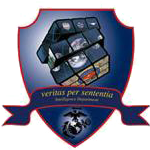

Marine Corps Intelligence is the intelligence element of the United States Marine Corps (USMC) and an element of the United States Intelligence Community. The Director of Intelligence supervises the Intelligence Department of HQMC and is responsible for policy, plans, programming, budgets, and staff supervision of Intelligence and supporting activities within the U.S. Marine Corps as well as supervising the Marine Corps Intelligence Activity (MCIA). The department supports the Commandant of the Marine Corps (CMC) in his role as a member of the Joint Chiefs of Staff (JCS), represents the service in Joint and Intelligence Community matters, and exercises supervision over the MCIA.

The Department has Service Staff responsibility for Geospatial Intelligence (GEOINT), Advanced Geospatial Intelligence (AGI), Signals Intelligence (SIGINT), Human Intelligence (HUMINT), Counterintelligence (CI), and ensures there is a single synchronized strategy for the development of the Marine Corps Intelligence, Surveillance and Reconnaissance (ISR) Enterprise.

The MCIA, located at Hochmuth Hall (see Bruno Hochmuth), provides tailored intelligence and services to the Marine Corps, other services, and the Intelligence Community based on expeditionary mission profiles in littoral areas. It supports the development of service doctrine, force structure, training and education, and acquisition. The Swain Annex of the Marine Corps Intelligence Activity (MCIA) complex is named for LCpl James E. Swain, USMC, who posthumously received the National Intelligence Medal for Valor for his service as a Marine Corps intelligence specialist during the Second Battle of Fallujah in Iraq."

== Marine Corps Intelligence Activity ==
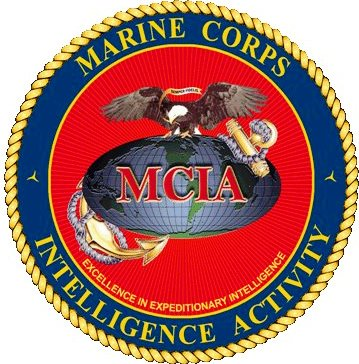

The Marine Corps Intelligence Activity (MCIA), created in 1987, is a field activity of Marine Corps Intelligence, United States Marine Corps, a member of the United States Intelligence Community. The MCIA describes itself as: "a vital part of military intelligence 'corporate enterprise,' and functions in a collegial, effective manner with other service agencies and with the joint intelligence centers of the Joint Chiefs of Staff and Unified Commands."

The Marine Corps Intelligence Activity mission is to provide intelligence services to the Marine Corps and the U.S. Intelligence Community. These services are based on expeditionary mission profiles in littoral areas. It supports the development of service doctrine, force structure, training and education, and acquisition.

MCIA determines what missions the Corps will likely need to carry out in the future and in what environments/nations, as well as what intelligence data will be required to support those likely missions. MCIA is in partnership with Marine Corps Intelligence the Office of Naval Intelligence and Office of Coast Guard Intelligence in the National Maritime Intelligence-Integration Office and at Marine Corps Base Quantico in Quantico, Virginia. MCIA has administrative control of the Marine Cryptologic Support Battalion, which supports the National Security Agency.

MCIA began as the Marine Corps Intelligence Command (MCIC), created in 1987 by then Commandant of the Marine Corps General Alfred M. Gray, Jr. Gray created MCIC to address the lack of expeditionary intelligence support for policy, acquisition, and operations, as each of the other service intelligence centers focused only on their needs. Colonel Walter Breede III was the first Director.

The flagship study of the center, "Planning and Programming Factors for Expeditionary Operations in the Third World", was published by the Marine Corps Combat Development Command (MCCDC) in March 1990, and was unusual for relying exclusively on open sources of information for creating a matrix of 143 mission area factors that could be objectively evaluated in relation to five degrees of difficulty, and for being published as an unclassified rather than a classified study.

== Marine Corps Intelligence, Surveillance, and Reconnaissance Enterprise (MCISR-E) ==
The Marine Corps Intelligence, Surveillance, and Reconnaissance Enterprise (MCISRE) Plan articulates and implements the Director of Intelligence's vision for designing and developing the MCISRE. The MCISR-E is a warfighting enterprise that supports decision-making through the provision of tailored intelligence that is timely, relevant, and predictive. The enterprise supports institutional decision-making through both the provision of relevant intelligence and the comprehensive integration of the intelligence warfighting function in operating concepts, structural decisions, and material investments. The multi-domain, collaborative, worldwide construct of the MCISR-E provides the crucial edge across the spectrum for both deployed and CONUS-based MAGTFs.

== History ==
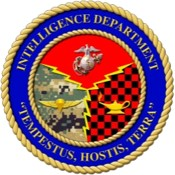

The Intelligence Department was established as on 27 April 2000 by General James L. Jones, USMC Commandant of the Marine Corps. Upon creating the Intelligence Department General Jones said: “I hope all Marines will recognize both the emblematic and practical significance of the Commandant having a “G2” who can serve as both a proponent for intelligence, surveillance and reconnaissance inside the combat development process and as the focal point for leveraging intelligence community support for our warfighting capability.” Source: CMC message 270849Z APR 00.

== 1994 Intelligence Plan ==
A major reinvigoration of Marine Corps Intelligence occurred in 1994, often called the "Van Riper Plan" after the Director of Intelligence at that time, LtGen Paul Van Riper. The Intel Plan assigned the following mission to Marine Corps Intelligence: "Provide Commanders at every level with tailored, timely, minimum essential intelligence, and ensure that this intelligence is integrated into the operational planning process." The Intel Plan was announced in March 1995 via All Marine (ALMAR) message 100/95.

== Early history ==
Marine Corps Intelligence is widely believed to have been established when CMC created the M-2 in 1939. According to HQ Memo 1–1939, dtd 21 Apr 1939, CMC redesignated the Division of Operations and Training as the Division of Plans and Policies. The new Division retained the same subdivisions as the old with the standard number designations of a general or executive staff, but designated "M" rather than "G." Under the supervision of a Director, the Division contained the standard M-1, Personnel; M-2, Intelligence; M-3, Training; and M-4, Supply and Equipment Sections and an M-5, War Plans Section, which was to be abolished in the fall of 1941, with M-5 functions being absorbed by M-3.

Some trace the establishment of Marine Corps Intelligence to 1920 because the Division of Operations and Training, which was created by Marine Corps Order of 1 December 1920 and may have been based on a CMC ltr to Col John H. Russell, dtd 19 Dec 1918, subj: Organization of Planning Section, 2385/130–30, was composed of Operations, Training, Military Education, Military Intelligence, and Aviation Sections. This MI Section is viewed by some as the establishment of Marine Corps Intelligence. BGen Logan Feland selected LtCol Earl Hancock "Pete" Ellis, USMC, to be the first director of the MI Section in December 1920.

== Marine Corps Counterintelligence ==
Marine Corps Counterintelligence (CI) is composed of Marine Counterintelligence Agents who conduct tactical Counterintelligence/Human Intelligence (CI/HUMINT) operations. All CI/HUMINT Marines must successfully complete the 17-week Marine Air-Ground Task Force (MAGTF) CI/HUMINT Basic Course conducted at the Navy & Marine Corps Intelligence Training Center (NMITC), in Dam Neck, Virginia. Upon graduation, CI/HUMINT Marines are accredited Counterintelligence Agents and are issued Marine Corps Counterintelligence Badge and Credentials.

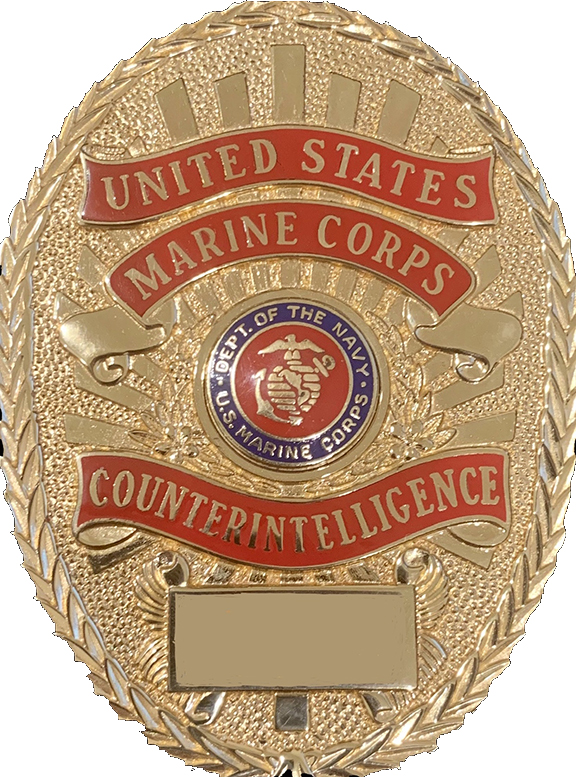
Marine Corps Counterintelligence Badge

Marine Counterintelligence Agents work to detect and prevent acts of terrorism, espionage, sabotage, subversion, sedition, treason and assassination. Marine Counterintelligence Agents also investigate cases of friendly personnel who may be Prisoners of War (POW), Missing In Action (MIA) or defectors. CI investigations within the Department of the Navy fall under the exclusive jurisdiction of the Naval Criminal Investigative Service (NCIS). During combat operations, the exclusive CI investigative jurisdiction held by NCIS in garrison is assigned to MAGTF commanders and is executed by Marine Counterintelligence Agents under the staff cognizance of the unit intelligence officer.

While conducting operations in tactical environments, Marine CI/HUMINT personnel often work in small teams called HUMINT Exploitation Teams (HET). HET's are designed to not only collect and report HUMINT information but to also exploit that intelligence information by acting on it. HET's also conduct Counterintelligence activities designed to deny, detect and deceive the enemy's ability to target friendly forces.

CI/HUMINT Non-Commissioned Officers are designated as "Counterintelligence/Human Intelligence Specialist" (MOS 0211). CI/HUMINT Warrant Officers are designated as "Counterintelligence Officer" (MOS 0210). CI/HUMINT Commissioned Officers are designated as "Counterintelligence and Human Source Intelligence Officer" (MOS 0204).

CI/HUMINT Marines attend US Army Airborne School and Survival, Evasion, Resistance & Escape (SERE) School. Eligible CI/HUMINT Marines will attend language training at the Defense Language Institute (DLI) in Monterey, California. Technically qualified CI/HUMINT Marines may be selected for Technical Surveillance Countermeasures (TSCM) training. Advanced training is available for qualified CI/HUMINT Marines from agencies within and outside the Department of Defense.

Highly qualified CI/HUMINT Marines may be selected to serve in operational or strategic-level billets in Marine Corps Forces Special Operations Command (MARSOC), NCIS, Defense Intelligence Agency (DIA) or other government agencies.

== Directors of Intelligence ==
- Lieutenant Colonel Earl Hancock Ellis, December 1920 – October 1921
- Unknown. November 1921 – January 1937
- Major James D. McLean, February 1937 – July 1937
- Major David A. Stafford, August 1937 – August 1940
- Captain William B. Steiner, August–October 1940
- Major Harold D. Harris, October 1940 – June 1942
- Lieutenant Colonel John C. McQueen, June 1942 – September 1943
- Major John W. Scott, Jr., September 1943 – January 1944
- Lieutenant Colonel George J. Clark, January–September 1944
- Lieutenant Colonel Edmond J. Buckley, September–December 1944
- Colonel James J. Keating, December 1944 – December 1945
- Colonel Edmond J. Buckley, December 1945 – February 1946
- Lieutenant Colonel Henry H. Crockett, February–April 1946
- Colonel Walter S. Osipoff, April 1946 – March 1948
- Colonel Albert Arsenault, March–June 1948
- Colonel Floyd R. Moore, August 1951 – July 1954
- Colonel Wilber J. McKenny, July 1954 – August 1955
- Colonel Robert A. Black, September 1955 – August 1956
- Colonel Robert E. Hommel, September 1956 – June 1957
- Colonel Bankson T. Holcomb Jr., July–September 1957
- Brigadier General James M. Masters, Sr., September 1957 – August 1960
- Colonel John F. Carey, August 1960 – June 1961
- Major General Carl A. Youngdale, June 1961 – July 1962
- Major General Robert E. Cushman, Jr., July 1962 – June 1964
- Colonel Randolph Carter Berkeley, Jr., June 1964 – June 1965
- Major General Michael P. Ryan, June 1965 – March 1966
- Colonel Robert A. Mercant, Jr., March–August 1966
- Major General William R. Collins, August–October 1966
- Colonel Robert A. Merchant, Jr., October 1966 – June 1967
- Colonel John S. Canton, July 1967 – August 1967
- Major General Carl W. Hoffman, August–December 1967
- Colonel John S. Canton, January–November 1968
- Colonel Stone W. Quillian, November 1968 – September 1972
- Colonel Lyle V. Tope, October 1972 – September 1973
- Colonel William Wentworth, October 1973 – August 1975
- Colonel Charles T. Williamson, August 1975 – December 1977
- Colonel John J. Donahue, January 1977 – August 1979
- Major General Clyde D. Dean, August 1979 – March 1981
- Brigadier General Harry T. Hagaman, April 1981 – June 1982
- Brigadier General George H. Leach, June 1982 – May 1983
- Brigadier General Lloyd W. Smith, May 1983 – June 1985
- Brigadier General Frank J. Breth, June 1985 – June 1988
- Brigadier General James D. Beans, July 1988 – July 1989
- Major General John A. Studds, August 1989 – June 1991
- Major General Harry W. Jenkins, June 1991 – April 1993
- Major General Paul Van Riper, April 1993 – July 1995
- Major General David A. Richwine, June 1995 – July 1997
- Major General Joseph T. Anderson, July 1997 – March 1998
- Brigadier General Robert M. Shea, July 1998 – July 2000
- Brigadier General Michael E. Ennis, August 2000 – January 2004
- SES Michael H. Decker, January 2004 – June 2005
- Brigadier General Richard M. Lake, June 2005 – July 2009
- Brigadier General Vincent R. Stewart, July 2009 – July 2013
- Brigadier General Michael Groen, July 2013 – June 2016
- Brigadier General William H. Seely III, June 2016 – May 2017
- Brigadier General Dimitri Henry, May 2017 – August 2019
- Brigadier General Melvin G. Carter, August 2019 – May 2021
- Major General William H. Seely III, August 2020 – June 2023
- LtGen Matthew Glavy, June 2023 – July 2024
- LtGen Melvin G. Carter, August 2024 – June 2025
- MajGen Mark A. Cunningham, June 2025 – June2026
- BGen Seth E. Anderson, July 2026 – present

== Marine Corps Intelligence Units ==
- 1st Intelligence Battalion
- 2nd Intelligence Battalion
- 3rd Intelligence Battalion
- Intelligence Support Battalion
- 1st Radio Battalion
- 2nd Radio Battalion
- 3rd Radio Battalion
- 1st Reconnaissance Battalion
- 2nd Reconnaissance Battalion
- 3rd Reconnaissance Battalion
- 4th Reconnaissance Battalion
- 3rd Force Reconnaissance Company
- 4th Force Reconnaissance Company
- Marine Unmanned Aerial Vehicle Squadron 1
- Marine Unmanned Aerial Vehicle Squadron 2
- Marine Unmanned Aerial Vehicle Squadron 3
- Marine Unmanned Aerial Vehicle Squadron 4
- Intelligence Company, 1st Marine Raider Support Battalion, Marine Forces Special Operations Command
- Intelligence Company, 2nd Marine Raider Support Battalion, Marine Forces Special Operations Command
- Intelligence Company, 3rd Marine Raider Support Battalion, Marine Forces Special Operations Command
- Marine Corps Intelligence Activity (MCIA)
- Marine Cryptologic Support Battalion
