= Michael E. Ennis =

United States Marine Corps general

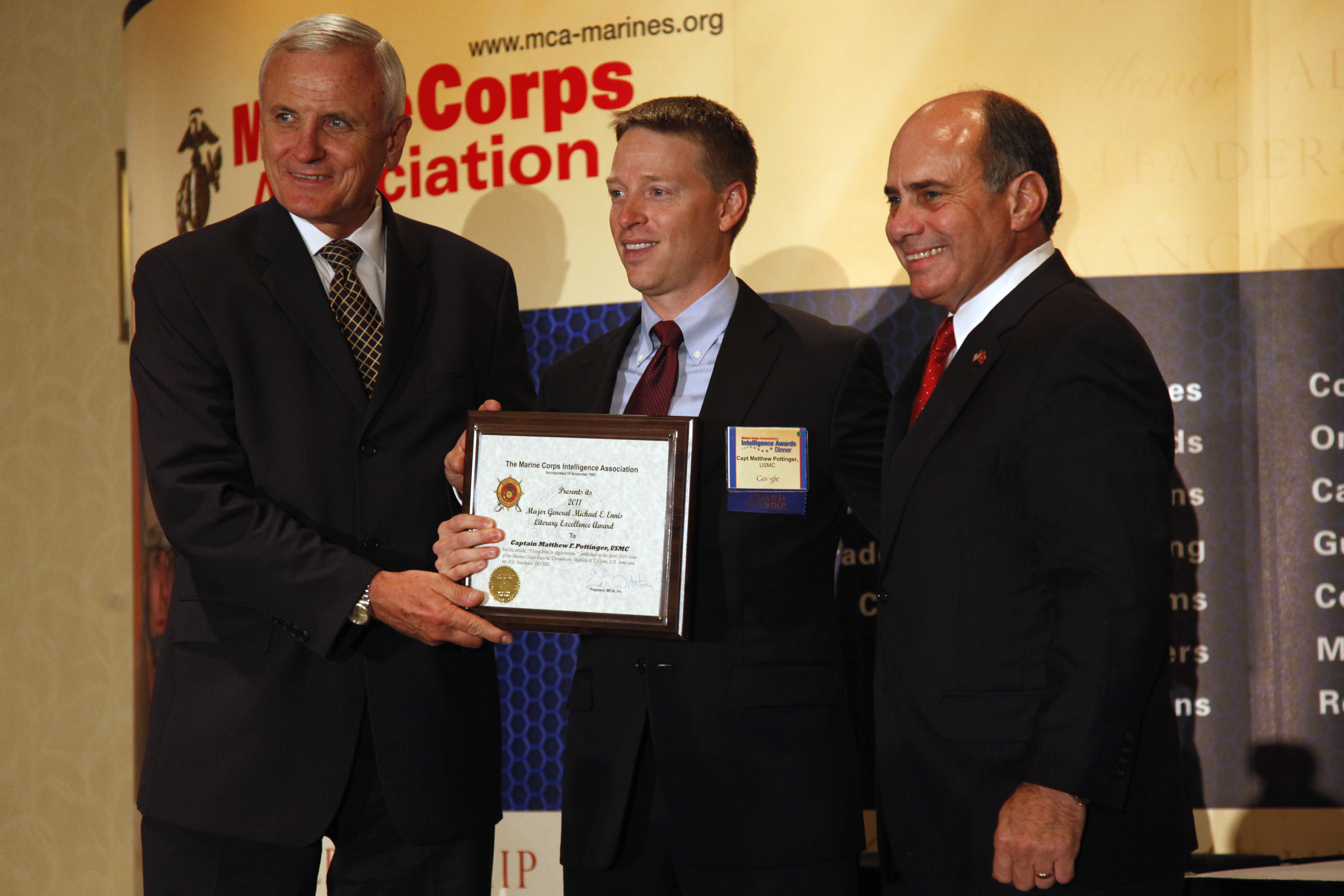
- MajGen M. E. Ennis, USMC on left
- Military career
- Allegiance: United States of America
- Branch: United States Marine Corps
- Service years: 1972–2007
- Rank: Major general
- Conflicts: Cold War

Michael E. Ennis is a former major general in the United States Marine Corps.

He is a native of Minnesota. He graduated from Concordia College with Bachelor of Arts degrees in French and International Relations and from Georgetown University with a Master of Arts degree in Government/National Security Studies.

== Career ==
Ennis was commissioned an officer in the Marine Corps on January 1, 1972 as a graduate of the Officer Candidates Class. After spending eighteen months in Okinawa, Japan, Ennis was assigned to Milwaukee, Wisconsin as a recruiting officer.

In 1978, he began studying Russian at the Defense Language Institute, as well as at the United States Army's Russian Institute in Garmisch-Partenkirchen, Germany. Afterwards, Ennis returned to Okinawa and later served with the 9th Marine Regiment. Upon his return to the United States, he became a translator on the Moscow-Washington hotline.

In 1986, Ennis was named Naval Representative to the Commander-in-Chief of the Group of Soviet Forces in Germany. After returning to United States, he completed a Military Fellowship at the Center for Strategic and International Studies. He was then stationed in Moscow, Russia as Assistant Naval Attaché and U.S. military representative to Azerbaijan.

Ennis was stationed at Headquarters Marine Corps in 1993, where he participated in the development of the Intelligence Plan of 1994 to improve Marine Corps Intelligence. He was then once again assigned to Okinawa, this time with the III Marine Expeditionary Force. In 1998, Ennis was given command of the Joint Intelligence Center of the United States Pacific Command. From August 2000 to January 2004, he was Director of Marine Corps Intelligence, where he oversaw USMC Intelligence support to Operations Enduring Freedom (OEF) and Iraqi Freedom (OIF). From 2004 to 2006 he served as Director of Operations (DO) and Director of Defense HUMINT (DH) for the Defense Intelligence Agency. In 2006, he was named Deputy Director of HUMINT of the Central Intelligence Agency. Ennis retired from the Marine Corps in 2007. He was awarded the CIA's Distinguished Intelligence Medal in 2008.

Awards he received during his military career include the Defense Superior Service Medal, the Legion of Merit, the Defense Meritorious Service Medal with two oak leaf clusters, the Joint Service Commendation Medal, the Navy and Marine Corps Commendation Medal with award star, the Army Commendation Medal and the Army Achievement Medal.

Since retiring from the Marine Corps, Ennis has served on the Federal Board of Advisors for Benchmark Executive Search.

He appeared in the documentary "Meet The Real Cold War Spies Of BRIXMIS" talking about his time with U.S. Military Liaison Mission (USMLM)
