= Radio Battalion =

United States Marine Corps tactical Signals Intelligence units

USMC Radio Battalions
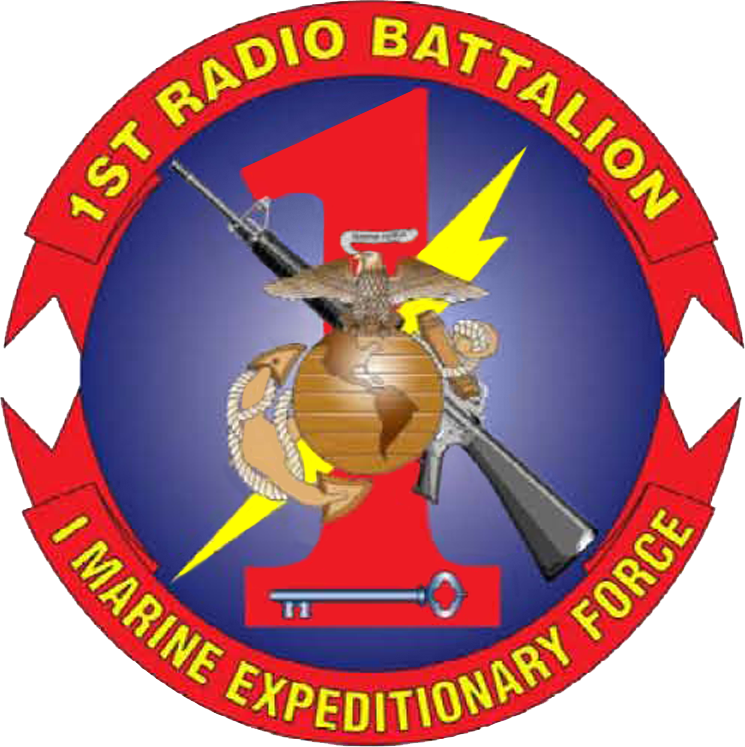
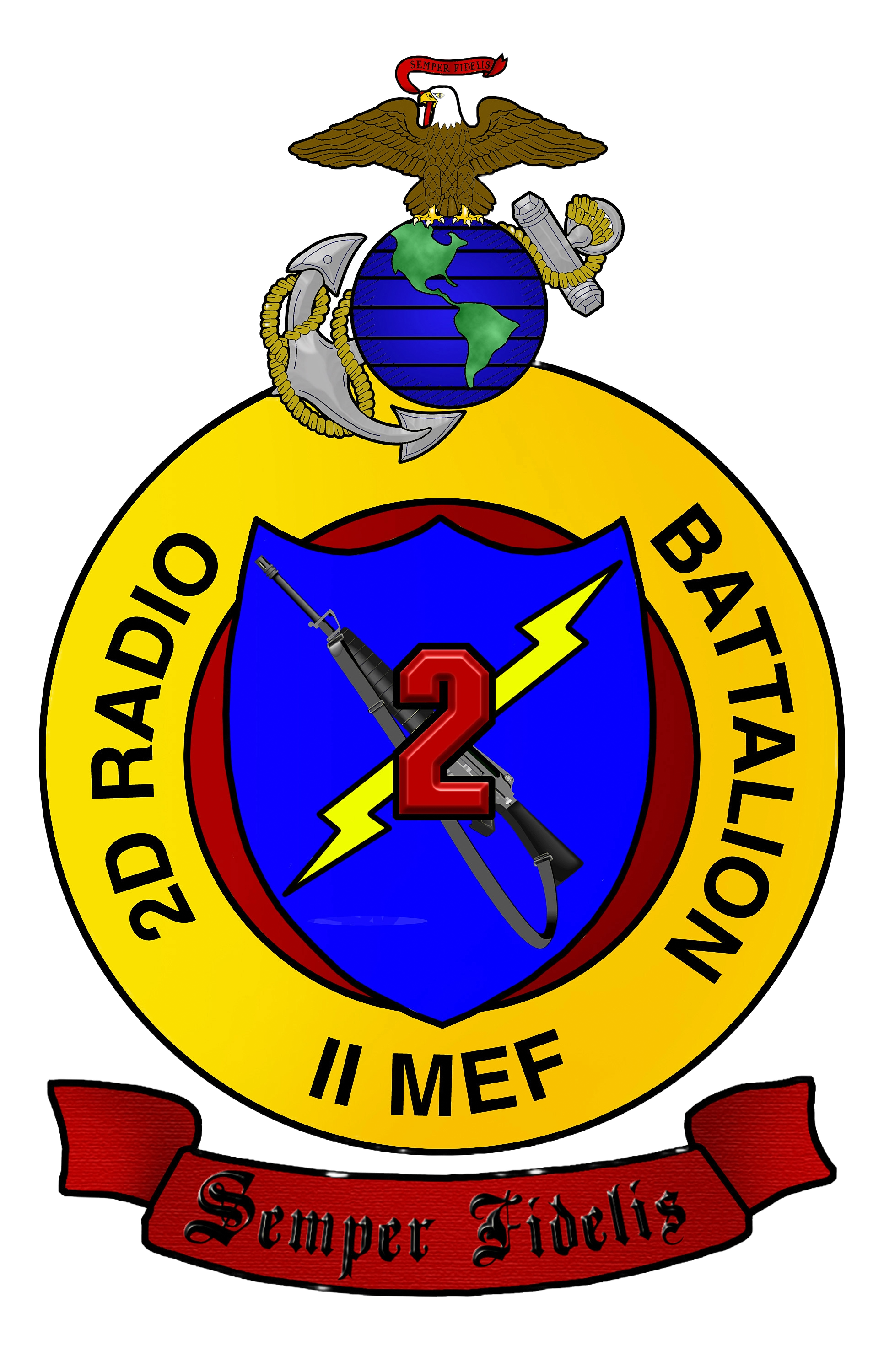
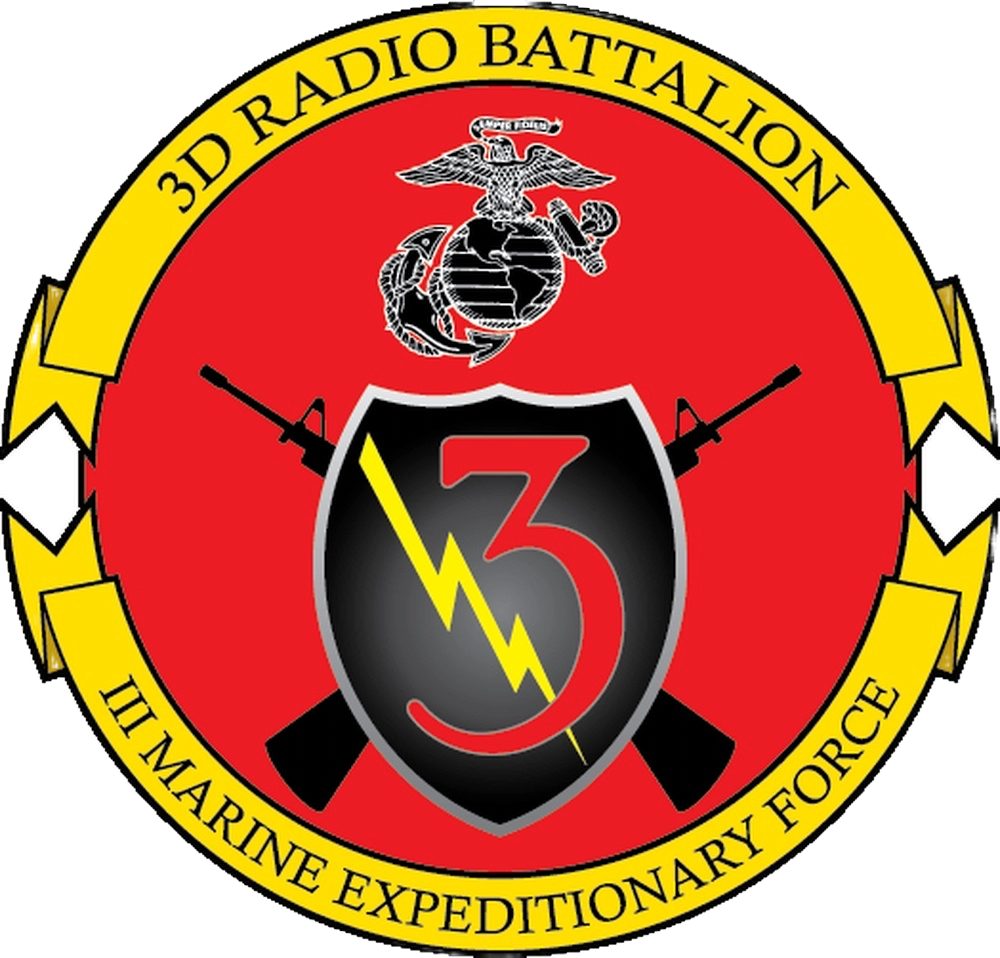
- Official Radio Battalion insignia
- Activated: 14 June 1943–1964 (as Radio Intelligence Platoons and Companies) 14 July 1964–present (as Radio Battalions)
- Country: United States
- Branch: United States Marine Corps
- Role: Command Element, Information Group
- Mission: Conduct SIGINT and EW operations, limited cyberspace operations, and special intelligence communications to support the MAGTF and joint force commander.

Current Disposition
- 1st Radio Bn: I MEF, Camp Pendleton
- 2d Radio Bn: II MEF, Camp Lejeune
- 3d Radio Bn: III MEF, MCB Hawaii

Engagements
- Show Engagements: World War II; Pacific War; Solomon Islands campaign; Gilbert and Marshall Islands campaign; Kwajalein; Mariana and Palau Islands campaign; Peleliu; Guam; Iwo Jima; Volcano and Ryukyu Islands campaign; Battle of Okinawa; Occupation of Japan; Chinese Civil War; Operation Beleaguer; Cold War; 1958 Lebanon crisis; Operation Blue Bat; Cuban Missile Crisis; Dominican Civil War; Operation Power Pack; Vietnam War; Da Nang; Phu Bai; Gulf of Tonkin incident; Khe Sanh; Post-Vietnam; Southeast Asia Evacuations; Operation Eagle Pull; Operation Frequent Wind; Recovery of SS Mayaguez; Multinational Force in Lebanon; Beirut III, IV, V, VI; Invasion of Grenada; Operation Urgent Fury; Gulf War; Operation Desert Shield; Operation Desert Storm; Operation Southern Watch; Somali Civil War; Unified Task Force; Operation Restore Hope; UNOSOM II; Operation United Shield; First Liberian Civil War; Operation Sharp Edge; Second Liberian Civil War; Joint Task Force Liberia; War on Terror; Operation Enduring Freedom; Afghanistan; Philippines; Horn of Africa; Iraq War; Humanitarian Relief Efforts; Operation Sea Angel; Operation Unified Assistance; Operation Unified Response; Operation Tomodachi

Leadership
Current commanders
1st Radio	LtCol David A. Serrano
2d Radio	LtCol Jason E. Gwin
3d Radio	LtCol Sean F. X. Barrett
- Notable leaders: Gen Alfred M. Gray LtGen Vincent Stewart LtGen Melvin "Jerry" Carter LtGen Dimitri Henry

Unit Decorations
- Show Decorations Presidential Unit Citation Joint Meritorious Unit Award Navy Unit Commendation Meritorious Unit Commendation Asiatic-Pacific Campaign Streamer American Campaign Streamer World War II Victory Medal Occupation Service Medal with "Asia" clasp National Defense Service Medal Armed Forces Expeditionary Medal Vietnam Service Medal Southwest Asia Service Medal Iraq Campaign Medal Global War on Terrorism Expeditionary Medal Global War on Terrorism Service Medal Republic of Korea Presidential Unit Citation Vietnam Gallantry Cross with Palm Vietnam Meritorious Unit Citation (Civil Actions)

The 1st, 2d, and 3d Radio Battalions are United States Marine Corps Signals Intelligence (SIGINT) units whose missions are to provide tactical SIGINT, ground Electronic Warfare (EW), limited cyberspace operations, and Special Intelligence communications tasked by the Marine Expeditionary Force (MEF) to support MEFs and their subordinate elements. Radio Battalions function primarily as intelligence-gathering and analytic organizations with capabilities connected to and integrated with theater and national SIGINT communities. Radio Battalions are responsible for establishing, operating, and maintaining Intelligence Information Architectures to accomplish this mission.

== Structure and Composition ==
Radio Battalions are largely populated by enlisted Marines in the 2600 Occupational Career Code (OCC) Field, but also Headquarters and Support elements drawn from other career fields. Marines in the 2600 OCC Field who may be assigned to Radio Battalions include: Special Communications Signals Collection Operator/Analysts, Electronic Intelligence (ELINT) Intercept Operator/Analysts, Cryptologic Language Analysts, and Intelligence Surveillance Reconnaissance (ISR) Systems Engineers. Commissioned Officers assigned to Radio Battalions include Signals Intelligence/Ground Electronic Warfare Officers.

Radio Battalions have traditionally consisted of a battalion headquarters, headquarters and service company, and designated operational companies. Operational components may include:

- Operational Control and Analysis Center (OCAC): senior SIGINT authority in a Marine Area of Operations, located within the Marine Air-Ground Task Force (MAGTF) CE intelligence operations center
  - OCACs typically include the following positions: OCAC Officer in Charge (OIC), Watch Officer/Watch Chief, Collection Manager, Senior Analyst, SIGINT Geospatial analysts, Digital Network Intelligence analysts, Cryptologic Linguists, SIGINT report writers, and Special Intelligence Communications
- Operational Command Elements (OCEs): subordinate to the OCAC; provide the Radio Battalion with extended command and control over SIGINT/EW (SIEW) teams and SIGINT operations. OCEs are task-organized based on the scope of their functions
- SIEW teams: primarily collection assets that perform low level analysis for Indications and Warnings purposes
  - Capabilities include: survey, collection, and exploitation of enemy signal(s), including digital networks; geolocation of enemy units; and dissemination and utilization of intelligence at the lowest tactical echelons
  - E.g. SIGINT Support Teams (SSTs) and Mobile Electronic Warfare Support System (MEWSS) teams
- Radio Reconnaissance Teams (RRT): specially trained and equipped SIGINT Marines who may support ground reconnaissance and surveillance elements
  - Radio reconnaissance platoons are trained in special insert and extract means and basic reconnaissance capabilities. They are sometimes leveraged to enhance understanding of threat operations prior to the arrival of other SIGINT support unit forces
  - Receive tactical movement direction from the ground reconnaissance commander and technical SIGINT direction from the Radio Battalion commander

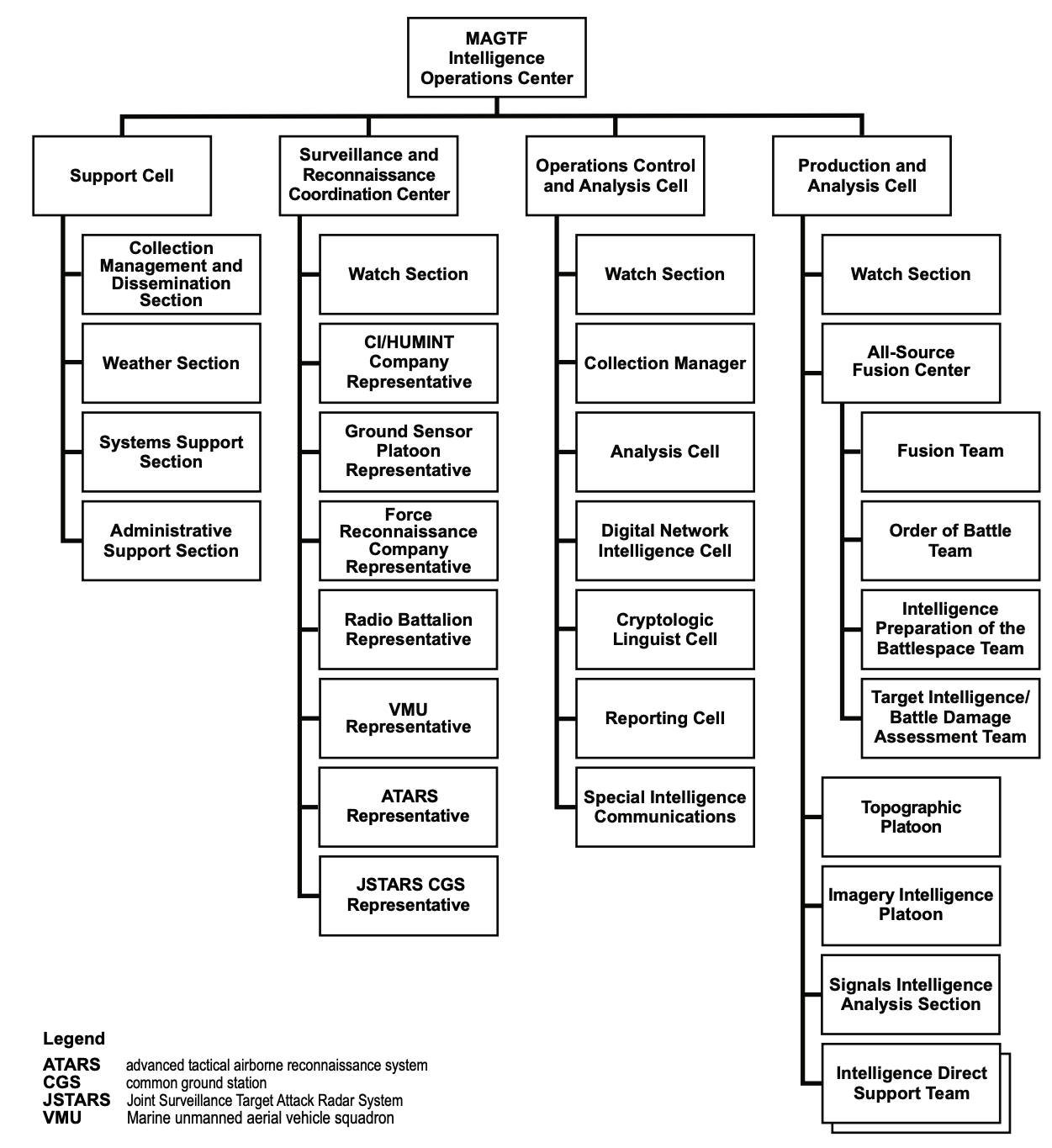
An excerpt from the Marine Corps Reference Publication on Signals Intelligence showing the organization of an Intelligence Operations Center showing the OCAC and distribution of select Radio Battalion elements.

All Radio Battalion operations, from the OCAC to individual teams, occur within sensitive compartmented information facilities (SCIFs). SCIFs may be static locations, temporary tactical fixtures, or mobile facilities to support and adjust to dynamic forward deployed operations.

== Oversight ==
Radio Battalion intelligence collection capabilities fall under the purview of DIRNSA/CHCSS (Director of the National Security Agency/Chief of the Central Security Service), controls the activities of SIGINT organizations down to the smallest tactical teams. The two sections of the United States Code relevant to Radio Battalions are Title 10 and Title 50.

- Title 10 furnishes the Commandant of the Marine Corps (CMC) with the authority to "organize, train, and equip" SIGINT Marines and sets forth oversight mechanisms.
- Title 50 describes intelligence and its sub categories and establishes the DIRNSA as the executive agent of SIGINT for the US Government.

The tactical SIGINT capabilities of Radio Battalions are also governed by Executive Order (EO), Department of Defense Directive (DoDD), Department of Defense Instruction (DODI), Department of Defense Regulation, Secretary of the Navy Instruction (SECNAVINST), and Marine Corps Order (MCO).

Executive Order (EO) 12333 is a foundational authority, which, very generally and among other things, limits the collection/interception of communications to foreign persons that occur wholly outside the United States as part of NSA's role as a combat support agency. Radio Battalions, therefore, are unable to conduct domestic SIGINT collection operations and instead rely on canned scenarios and scripts to create facsimiles of potential real-world operations.

== History ==
=== World War II ===
The first iterations of Radio Battalions were Radio Intelligence Platoons activated on 14 June 1943, at Camp Elliott in Linda Vista, California. By 1945, four platoons provided cryptological support to Marine combat divisions during World War II campaigns in the Solomon Islands, Guam, Iwo Jima, Kwajalein, Peleliu, and Okinawa.

Radio Intelligence Platoons were active during the occupation of Japan in 1945 and the occupation of North China from October 1945–February 1946 during Operation Beleaguer.

In 1945, upon the conclusion of WWII and concomitant post-war occupation, the Radio Intelligence Platoons were deactivated. By fall of 1949, the platoons were re-designated as a company-size reserve unit, the 5th Signal Company, headquartered with the Fifth Marine Corps Reserve District in Washington, D. C.

=== Korean War ===
In 1950, a table of organization and equipment (T/O&E) allowed for the activation of a company-sized radio unit with a specific carve-out for a cryptanalysis section. Systems of tactical intercept support established during World War II had disappeared almost entirely by the start of the Korean War.

The Korean War spurred the February 1951 activation of the reserve 5th Signal Company, which was renamed 1st Radio Company and relocated to Camp Pendleton, where it would remain for the duration of the war. 1st Radio Company was not considered combat ready, as it lacked the necessary equipment for its operations.

According to unclassified CIA studies, Marines had no tactical SIGINT support during the Korean War, the absence of which reportedly contributed to the retreat of the 1st Marine Division at the Chosin Reservoir. The Korean War hastened enhancement of the Marine Corps' tactical SIGINT posture in the years following the war, including an investment in cryptologic linguists.

In July 1954, 1st Radio Company relocated to Camp Lejeune and set up its new base of operations aboard Camp Geiger in support of Fleet Marine Force, Atlantic.

On 15 September 1958, 1st Radio Company was re-designated 2d Radio Company at Camp Lejeune and a new 1st Radio Company was activated at Camp Smith, Hawaii to support Marine Corps Forces, Pacific (MARFORPAC). The units were briefly re-designated as Composite Radio Companies, but reverted to Radio Companies in 1962.

=== Cold War ===
From 1 July – 1 November 1958, the North Carolina-based Radio Company sent a detachment to support Marine Forces involved in the 1958 Lebanon crisis during Operation Blue Bat.

During the Cuban Missile Crisis in 1962, North Carolina-based 2d Composite Radio Company provided support to ground and naval elements.

In 1964, Radio Companies were authorized to reconstitute as battalions. That July, the 2d Composite Radio Company was re-designated 2d Radio Battalion. It was deployed to the Dominican Republic between April and June 1965 as part of Operation Power Pack, the US invasion of the island during the Dominican Civil War.

On 19 April 1967, 2d Radio Battalion formed Detachment "M" to provide support to a Naval Security Group Activity (NAVSECGRU) site in Sidi Yahia, Morocco, until the site's signal operations were discontinued on 13 July 1972.

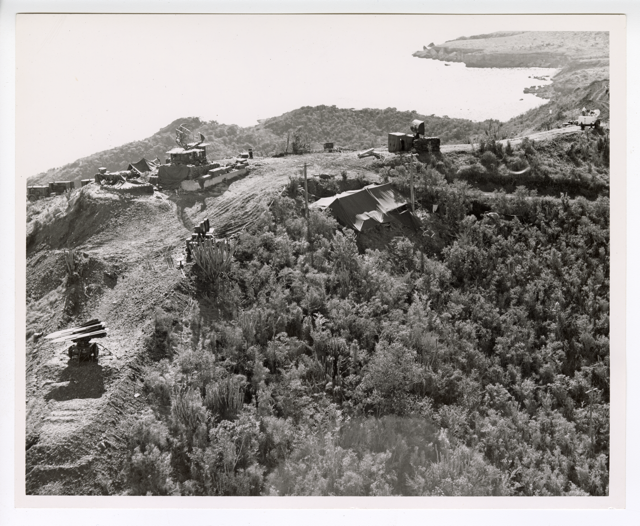
John Paul Jones Hill overlooking the south coast of Guantánamo Bay, Cuba, photographed during the Cuban Missile Crisis in 1962. 2d Radio Battalion maintained a permanent detachment at this location from 1970 to 2000 in support of NAVSECGRU.

In November 1970, 2d Radio Battalion supported Sub-Unit One, Company L, Marine Support Battalion at John Paul Jones Hill with NAVSECGRU, Guantánamo Bay, Cuba. 2d Radio Battalion provided support as a permanent detachment through 16 March 2000, when Naval Security Group Activity (NSGA), Guantánamo Bay and Company L, Marine Support Battalion, held a joint decommissioning ceremony.

2d Radio Battalion provided support to the multinational peace-keeping force in Lebanon from September 1982–April 1984 and the U.S. invasion of Grenada in 1983.

In May 1990, civil war erupted in Liberia as rebel forces led by Charles Taylor's National Patriotic Front of Liberia advanced on the capital Monrovia. As part of Operation Sharp Edge, the 22nd MEU positioned offshore aboard USS Saipan to conduct a non-combatant evacuation operation (NEO) if required.

On 10 June 1990, Colonel John Amos dispatched three members of the MEU's 2d Radio Battalion detachment to Monrovia by boat to augment the forward command element at the U.S. Embassy. The detachment, headed by Sergeant Kenneth M. Sharp, established intercept equipment at the embassy and monitored the unsecured radio nets of the various armed factions operating in and around Monrovia.

The Liberian combatants' lax operations security (OPSEC) made collection straightforward, as most government and rebel forces communicated in Liberian English, and incorrectly believed American personnel could not translate the dialects they used for sensitive communications. Throughout the MEU's operation, the detachment provided the Saipan with daily intelligence reports for analysis.

==== Vietnam War ====
From 15 January 1962 – 31 December 1962, the Hawaii-based 1st Composite Radio Company augmented the 3rd Radio Research Unit (3rd RRU), a US Army Security Agency Unit (ASA). The 42 Marines comprising the initial detachment were sent to Pleiku in the II Corps Tactical Zone (II CTZ) and later to Phu Bai, falling under the broad umbrella of the U.S. Military Assistance Command, Vietnam (USMACV or MACV). The 1st Composite Radio Company elements deployed during this period were referred to as "Sub-Unit One". By December 1962, 1st Composite Radio Company's Detachment had been reduced from 42 officers and men to only 16.

In the spring of 1964, the unit, having been renamed 1st Radio Company, dispatched a larger force to Da Nang. This detachment, dubbed the Signal Engineering Survey Unit (SESU), was commanded by future 29th commandant of the Marine Corps, then-Major Alfred M. Gray, Jr. SESU included a 76-man infantry detachment drawn from Company G, 2nd Battalion, 3rd Marines.

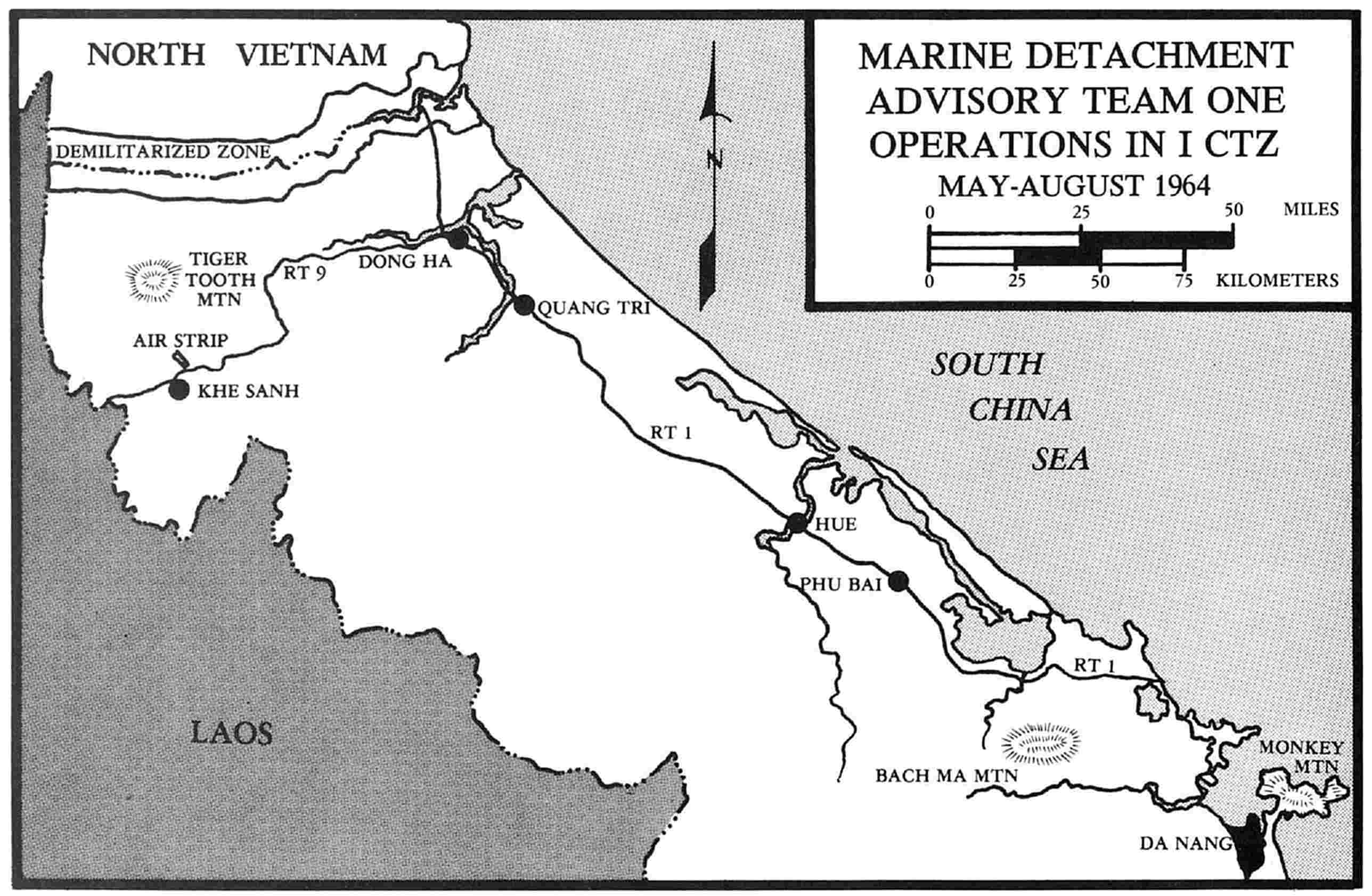
Map of Marine Detachment Advisory Team One operations in I Corps Tactical Zone, May–August 1964. Tiger Tooth Mountain, where the SESU unit operated, is visible in the upper left.

SESU elements were dispatched to Phu Bai, to support the ASA intelligence facility; Da Nang, for liaison and logistics; and the crest and slopes of Tiger Tooth Mountain (Dong Voi Mẹp, 16.768°N 106.713°E), a jungle-covered mountain located eight miles north of the Civilian Irregular Defense Group (CIDG) camp at Khe Sanh in northwestern Quảng Trị province. SESU Marines were transported to the mountain by helicopter, with an additional party stationed at Khe Sanh to provide supply and relief at regular intervals. In Khe Sanh, the SESU used the moniker Marine Detachment, Advisory Team One as a cover term to obscure its operations.

Major Gray prohibited Marines at Tiger Tooth Mountain from patrolling or engaging in offensive engagements to minimize the risk of their presence and capabilities being discovered. Despite these precautions, the SESU team was forced to withdraw from the mountain and relocate to Da Nang in July 1964, following repeated probes by enemy forces and indications their position had been compromised.

Captain Raymond A. Becker, a communications officer from the 1st Radio Company (FMFPAC), relieved Major Gray as the commander of the unit on 13 August 1964. Under Captain Becker's command, Advisory Team One redeployed to Dong Bach Ma, a 3,500-foot mountain located roughly 25 miles west-northwest of Da Nang.

Meanwhile, SESU Marines in Phu Bai, operating alongside the 3rd RRU (ASA), focused on intercepting Democratic Republic of Vietnam (DRV) reactions to DESOTO (DeHaven Special Operations off TsingtaO) patrols in the Gulf of Tonkin. Shortly before noon on 2 August 1964, SESU Marines intercepted a message from a DRV patrol boat indicative of a planned attack and issued a CRITIC, that is a report of the highest urgency, accordingly. Later on 2 August, the USS Maddox engaged three DRV torpedo boats, having been forewarned by the earlier SIGINT report.

On 4 August 1964, the naval SIGINT detachment aboard the USS Maddox received another CRITIC and a follow-up report from the SESU unit warning of additional planned attacks. Retrospective analysis identified significant discrepancies between the actual content of the 4 August intercepts versus what was reported by the SESU Marines. Incongruences in the 4 August reports and subsequent translations and analysis were not immediately corrected by the National Security Agency, as would have been standard procedure, but instead were described as having been used as evidence to support the Johnson administration's narrative regarding the Gulf of Tonkin incident.

SESU continued operations until it was disbanded and its members returned to parent commands in Hawaii and Washington, D.C. in mid-September 1964.

In July 1964, the 1st and 2d Radio Companies were re-designated as 1st and 2d Radio Battalions, located in Hawaii and North Carolina, respectively. 1st Radio Battalion continued its support of operations in Vietnam from February 1967–April 1971.

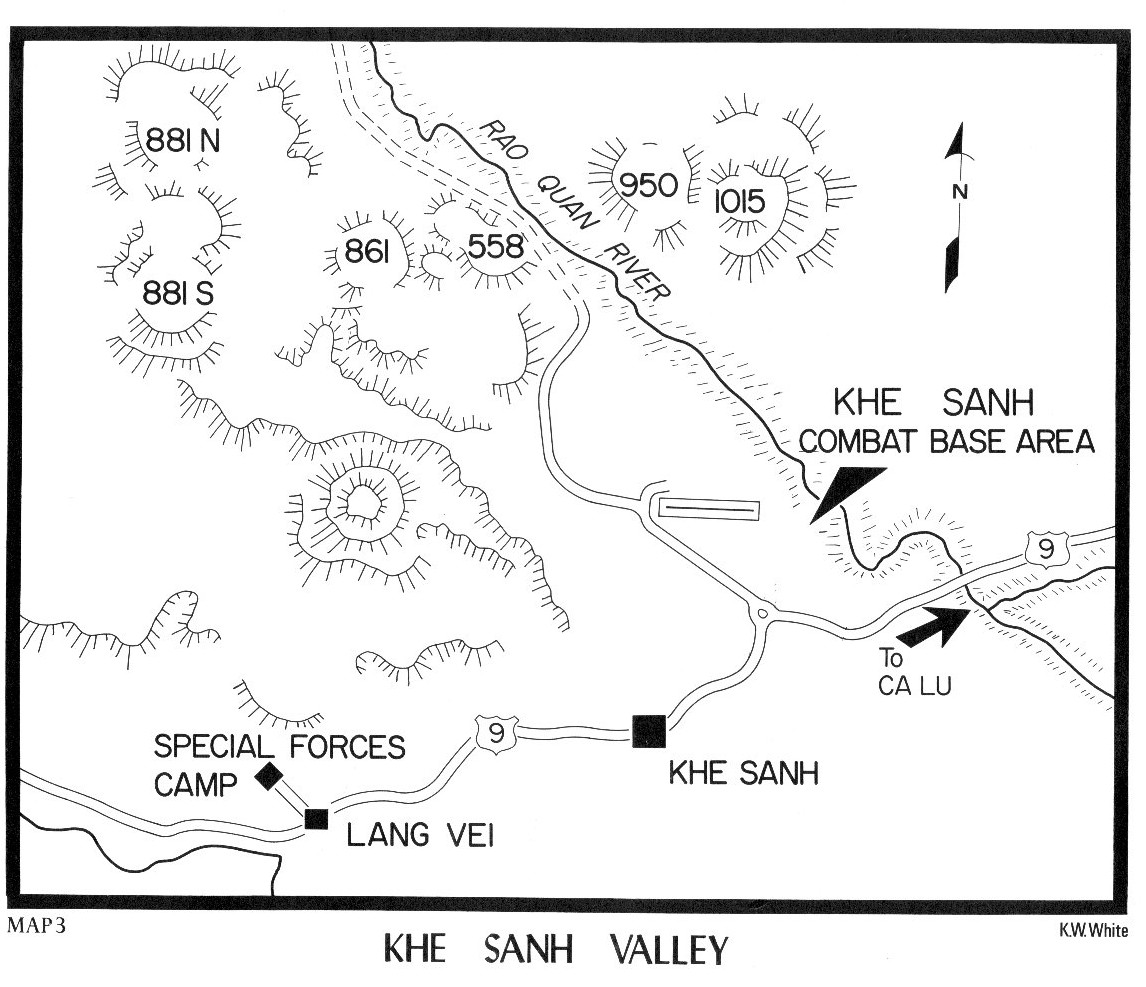
Area map of locations around Khe Sanh Combat Base and along the Rào Quán river, including positions on outlying hills.

In 1967, Gray, by then a Lieutenant Colonel (LtCol), assumed command of 1st Radio Battalion in Vietnam. Around November 1967, a detachment of 1st Radio Battalion Marines set up a post near the landing zone on Hill 881 South, north of Khe Sahn. During a briefing to III Marine Amphibious Force (III MAF) leaders at the end of November, LtCol Gray shared reports derived from intercepts of People's Army of Vietnam (PAVN) radio traffic indicating Khe Sanh would likely be targeted by a PAVN offensive. After much debate, then LtGen Robert E. Cushman Jr. accepted LtCol Gray's hypothesis and resolved to reinforce Khe Sanh "when the time came". Following subsequent intelligence reports bolstering Gray's initial assessment, 3rd Battalion, 26th Marines were hastily airlifted to Khe Sanh on 13 December 1967, for Operation Scotland in advance of the January 1968 Siege of Khe Sanh by PAVN forces.

Throughout January 1968, SIGINT reporting produced by Radio Battalion Marine continued to reflect significant PAVN troop movements into the northern part of Quảng Trị Province. Customarily, the SIGINT detachment at Khe Sanh recorded transmissions and shipped them to its headquarters at Da Nang for translation, but when fighting began in earnest on 21 January it became immediately evident that this process was too lengthy to effectively support combat operations. On 22 January the detachment at Khe Sanh was reinforced with a Vietnamese language voice exploitation team from Da Nang. During the siege, Colonel David Lownds, commander of the 26th Marine Regiment, frequently visited the detachment's bunker, sometimes multiple times a day, to request the latest intelligence reports.

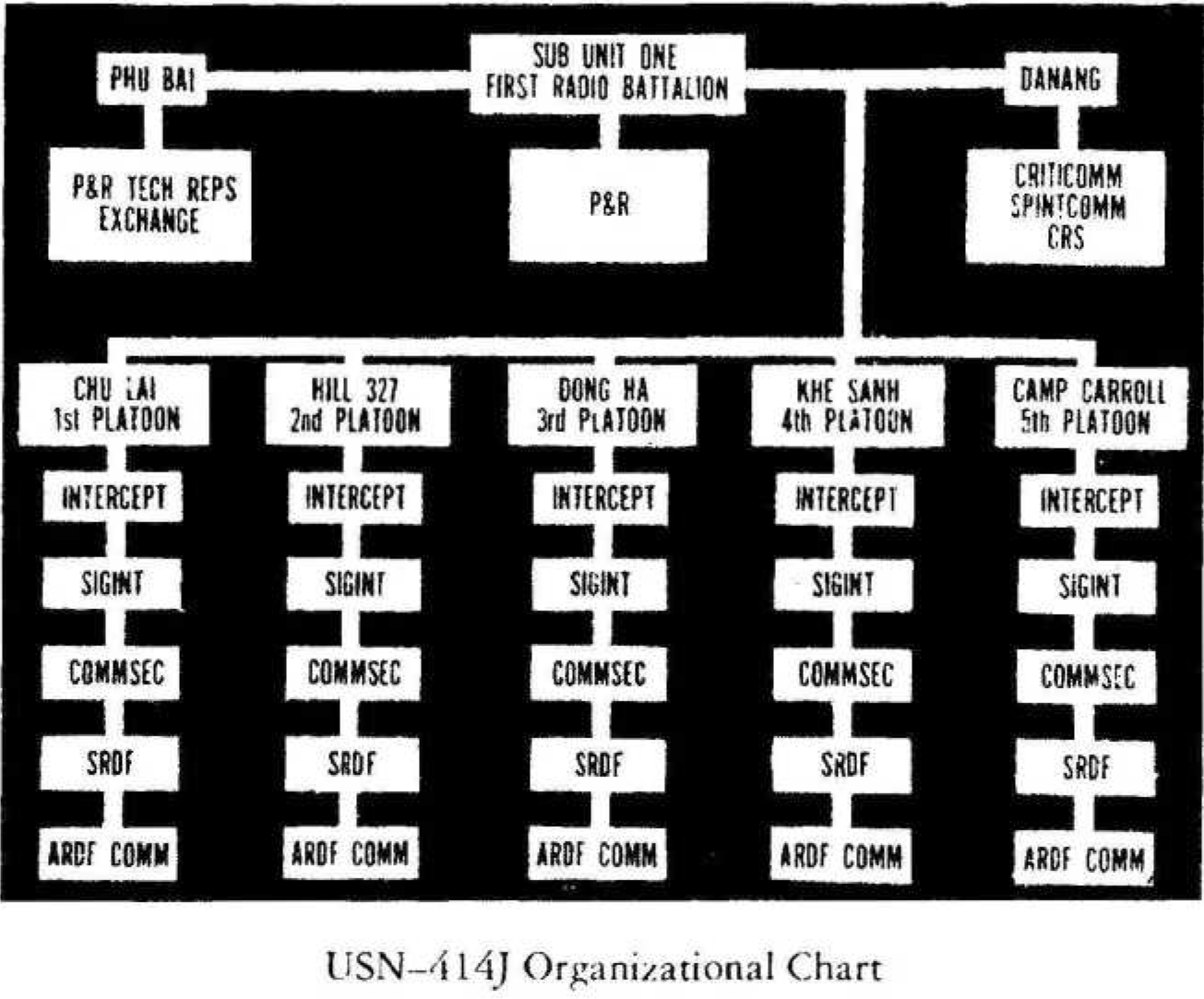
USN-414J Organization Chart reflecting structure of SIGINT support system for Khe Sanh during the 1968 Battle at Khe Sanh.

In 1969, 1st Radio Battalion continued its support to III MAF, monitoring not only for enemy communications, but also friendly transmissions to identify communications security (COMSEC) violations or compromises. The battalion averaged roughly 4,000 "fixes" (radio direction finding) for enemy transmitter sites per month and in March 1969, reported 194 COMSEC violations in 118,920 monitored messages.

The battalion was headquartered at Camp Horn, with its Headquarters and Service Company at nearby Camp Hoa Long, on the South China Sea just outside Da Nang, and its Operations Company at Dong Ha. Six task-organized platoons were spread throughout fire support bases and observation posts in Quảng Trị and Quảng Nam, where they provided immediate tactical support for both regimental and division operations. In October 1969, the unit established a Joint Tactical Processing Center in Dong Ha to onboard Army SIGINT agencies to assume mission support following the Marines' departure.

By January 1970, III MAF had grown into an inter-service headquarters in I CTZ, with support from Marines, Navy, and Army units. While originally scheduled for redeployment, a majority of Radio Battalion personnel remained in theater following a discussion in June 1970, in which the value and necessity of their intelligence products were highlighted. The battalion participated in large operations, including Pickens Forest, Catawba Falls, and Imperial Lake, with direct support units accompanying command groups to provide immediate, rapid exploitation capabilities.

In late 1970, III MAF Deputy G-3, Colonel John W. Haggerty III, stated that 1st Radio Battalion was producing "probably the best intelligence that the Marine Corps has ever had . . . . We always knew what the enemy was going to do and could always prepare for it". Redeployments in January–June 1971 dissolved the Marine intelligence posture. 1st Radio Battalion began deactivation and redeployment in early March 1971, while the battalion's command group and colors departed Vietnam on 15 April 1971. A radio detachment of six officers and 79 enlisted Marines remained attached to 3d Marine Amphibious Brigade's Headquarters and Service Company until all Marine intelligence collection activities in Vietnam ceased on 7 May 1971.

Following the battalion's redeployment to Hawaii in April 1971, a small detachment continued to support combat operations in Southeast Asia. During the Easter Offensive of 1972, Captain Clarence W. Phillips commanded Detachment "N," composed of 12 Marines from 1st Radio Battalion. Detachment "N" operated from the radio spaces of the USS Blue Ridge as part of Task Force 76's Joint Intelligence Center. The detachment was augmented by additional Radio Battalion personnel and, from 24 April 1972, provided direct support simultaneously from naval gunfire ships and the Blue Ridge. In July 1972, Captain Phillips and his men moved to the USS Paul Revere when the Blue Ridge returned to the United States, while the detachment's analysts rotated to the Naval Communications Station, San Miguel, Philippines. Detachment "N" was deactivated on 21 January 1973.

1st Radio Battalion elements participated in Operation Eagle Pull, the 12 April 1975 helicopter evacuation of Phnom Penh as Cambodia fell to the Khmer Rouge, and Operation Frequent Wind, the 29–30 April 1975 evacuations of U.S. personnel and at-risk locals in Saigon. In May 1975, the battalion supported the recovery of the SS Mayaguez.

==== Post-Cold War ====
In December 1992, 1st Radio Battalion deployed in support of Operation Restore Hope, the Unified Task Force (UNITAF) authorized under United Nations Security Council Resolution 794 with the aim of creating a "secure environment for humanitarian relief operations in Somalia".

In 1995, elements of 1st Radio Battalion subsequently participated in Operation United Shield, the evacuation of all UN Peacekeeping Forces from Somalia and the conclusion of United Nations Operation in Somalia II (UNOSOM II).

Elements of 1st Radio Battalion participated in Operation Southern Watch, the post-Gulf War enforcement of the southern Iraqi no-fly zone, in 1999.

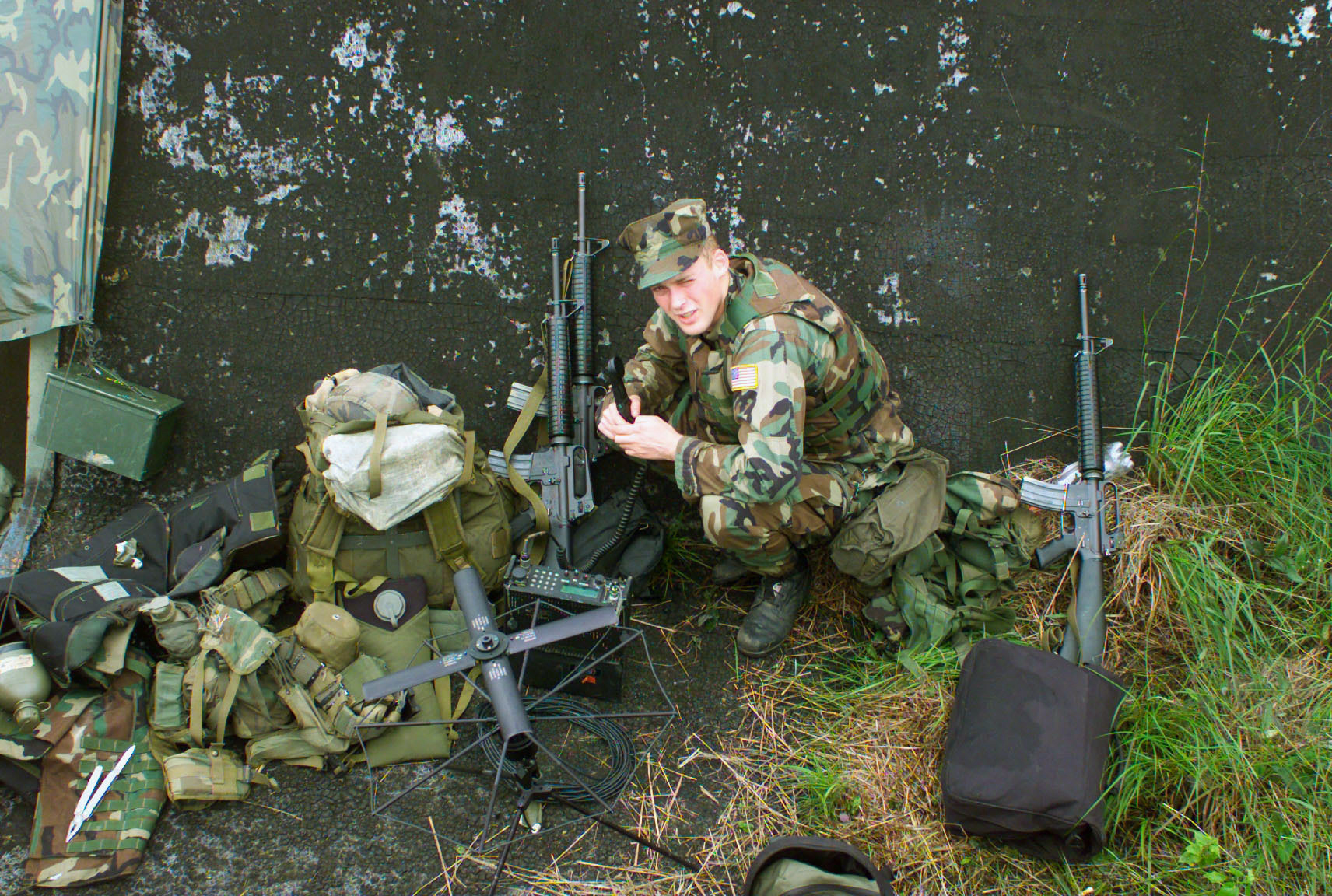
A Marine Corporal with 2d Radio Battalion assigned to the 26th MEU performs radio checks at a staging area at Roberts International Airport, Liberia, during Joint Task Force Liberia in 2003.

2d Radio Battalion's lineage documents additionally note general support to operations in the Persian Gulf, Indian Ocean, Arabian Gulf, Mediterranean, Somalia, Haiti, and Liberia throughout the late 1980s and 1990s, reflecting the battalion's sustained forward presence through MEU deployments during this period.

=== Continued Evolution ===
In spring 1984, then-Major General Gray, as Commanding General of Fleet Marine Force, Atlantic, sought to test the concept of a team of Marines with signals intelligence capabilities trained to conduct specialized reconnaissance operations beyond the conventional SIGINT support role. LtCol Chuck Gallina, then commanding officer of 2d Radio Battalion, and Captain Ernie Gillespie, a signals intelligence officer, were tasked to screen Marines of 2d Radio Battalion for this undertaking. After initial resistance from Marines and their commanders, the effort persisted through trial and error until the first radio reconnaissance team was established in 1987.

General Gray's influence on Marine Corps special operations capabilities extended beyond SIGINT. On 14 September 1984, CMC General Paul X. Kelley directed Gray to study Marine Corps special operations capabilities and recommend enhancements. A study group convened at II Marine Amphibious Force headquarters at Camp Lejeune from 19 November – 17 December 1984, producing "Examination of Marine Corps Special Operations Enhancements," which reviewed existing capabilities and recommended options for improving them.

Then-Lieutenant General Gray submitted his findings to CMC General Kelley on 26 March 1985, and on 7 June 1985, Kelley adopted the plan to enhance Marine Corps special operations capabilities by improving the existing structure rather than creating a separate dedicated force, directing Fleet Marine Force, Atlantic to begin the program using a Marine Amphibious Unit as the test bed.

The new unit was tentatively designated "Marine Amphibious Unit (Special Operations Capable)," or MAU(SOC). In December 1985, the 26th MAU became the first unit to be certified MAU(SOC) after completing a four-month special operations capable training program. On 5 February 1988, Gray, by then Commandant, re-designated all Marine air-ground task forces from "Amphibious" to "Expeditionary," and the MAU(SOC)s became MEU(SOC)s overnight.

=== Gulf War ===
Both 1st and 2d Radio Battalions deployed in support of Operation Desert Shield and Operation Desert Storm. 1st Radio Battalion deployed as part of 1st Surveillance, Reconnaissance, and Intelligence Group (1st SRIG) under I Marine Expeditionary Force (I MEF), commanded by LtCol Thomas J. Flaherty. 2d Radio Battalion, deploying from Camp Lejeune as part of II Marine Expeditionary Force, provided detachments to the 4th Marine Expeditionary Brigade afloat in the Persian Gulf.

Prior to the ground campaign, 1st Radio Battalion was incorporated into I MEF's deception planning cell, formed in mid-December 1990 under LtCol Franklin D. Lane. The cell developed courses of action intended to deceive Iraqi forces as to the location and intentions of Coalition forces, operating on the assessment that human intelligence and electronic intelligence were the primary and secondary Iraqi collection capabilities respectively.

Afloat, 2d Radio Battalion detachment personnel prepared heliborne electronic jammers and electronic emissions simulators to support a naval deception operation off the Kuwaiti coast on 24–25 February 1991. The deception operation was intended to convince Iraqi commanders that an amphibious assault was imminent, thereby diverting their attention and forces to the coast. Electronic intelligence subsequently confirmed the deception was successful, with Iraqi commanders reporting to Baghdad that an amphibious landing was underway and requesting reinforcements along the coast.

During the ground campaign, 1st Radio Battalion provided ground-based electronic warfare support alongside Grumman EA-6B Prowler aircraft of Marine Attack Electronic Warfare Squadron 2. Through its forward positioned MEWSS vehicles, the battalion made a limited intelligence contribution through communications intercept of Iraqi tactical radio traffic. However, the effectiveness of SIGINT collection was significantly constrained by Iraqi reliance on landline communications, which limited the volume of exploitable traffic. Additionally, the battalion's direction finding equipment was assessed as outdated and insufficiently accurate for use in targeting.

In post-war interviews, both Major General James Myatt, commanding the 1st Marine Division, and Major General William Keys, commanding the 2nd Marine Division, praised the Radio Battalion's electronic warfare performance. General Keys noted while he felt there had not been enough front-line battle intelligence, electronic warfare assets, specifically Radio Battalion "worked very well" and had provided "close to real-time intelligence support".

2d Radio Battalion detachment personnel also participated in the maritime interdiction of the Ibn Khaldoon, an Iraqi vessel stopped in the Persian Gulf on 26 December 1990, as part of the United Nations sanctions enforcement effort. A four-man team from 2d Radio Battalion accompanied the 4th Marine Expeditionary Brigade (MEB) helicopter insertion force aboard USS Shreveport during planning and execution of the boarding operation.

Following the conclusion of combat operations, elements of 1st Radio Battalion remained forward deployed as part of the 5th MEB for humanitarian relief operations in Bangladesh following Cyclone 02B in April–May 1991. The 1st Radio Battalion detachment formed part of the 5th Surveillance, Reconnaissance, and Intelligence Support Group (5th SRISG) organized specifically to support the brigade's humanitarian mission, known as Operation Sea Angel.

=== War on Terror ===
On 6 August 2004, 1st Radio Battalion was reactivated at Camp Pendleton, California, after having operated out of Kaneohe Bay, Hawaii since 1959. 3d Radio Battalion was reactivated in Kaneohe Bay on 31 July 2004. Following this shuffle, battalion names and geographic locations have remained static:

- 1st Radio Battalion: Camp Pendleton, supporting I MEF
- 2d Radio Battalion: Camp Lejeune, supporting II MEF
- 3d Radio Battalion: Marine Corps Base Hawaii, Kaneohe Bay, supporting III MEF

In October 2001, 1st Radio Battalion commenced what would become a sustained series of deployments in support of Operation Enduring Freedom (OEF). From 2003 – 2014, all three Radio Battalions maintained high operational tempos with regular, recurring deployments or personnel augments supporting OEF and Operation Iraqi Freedom.

==== MCSOCOM Detachment One (2003–2006) ====
Following the September 11 attacks, the Marine Corps and United States Special Operations Command (USSOCOM) moved to formalize a Marine contribution to the special operations community. On 4 December 2002, Marine Corps Bulletin 5400 formally established the Marine Corps Special Operations Command Detachment (Det One) as a two-year proof-of-concept test, including the incorporation of an intelligence element.

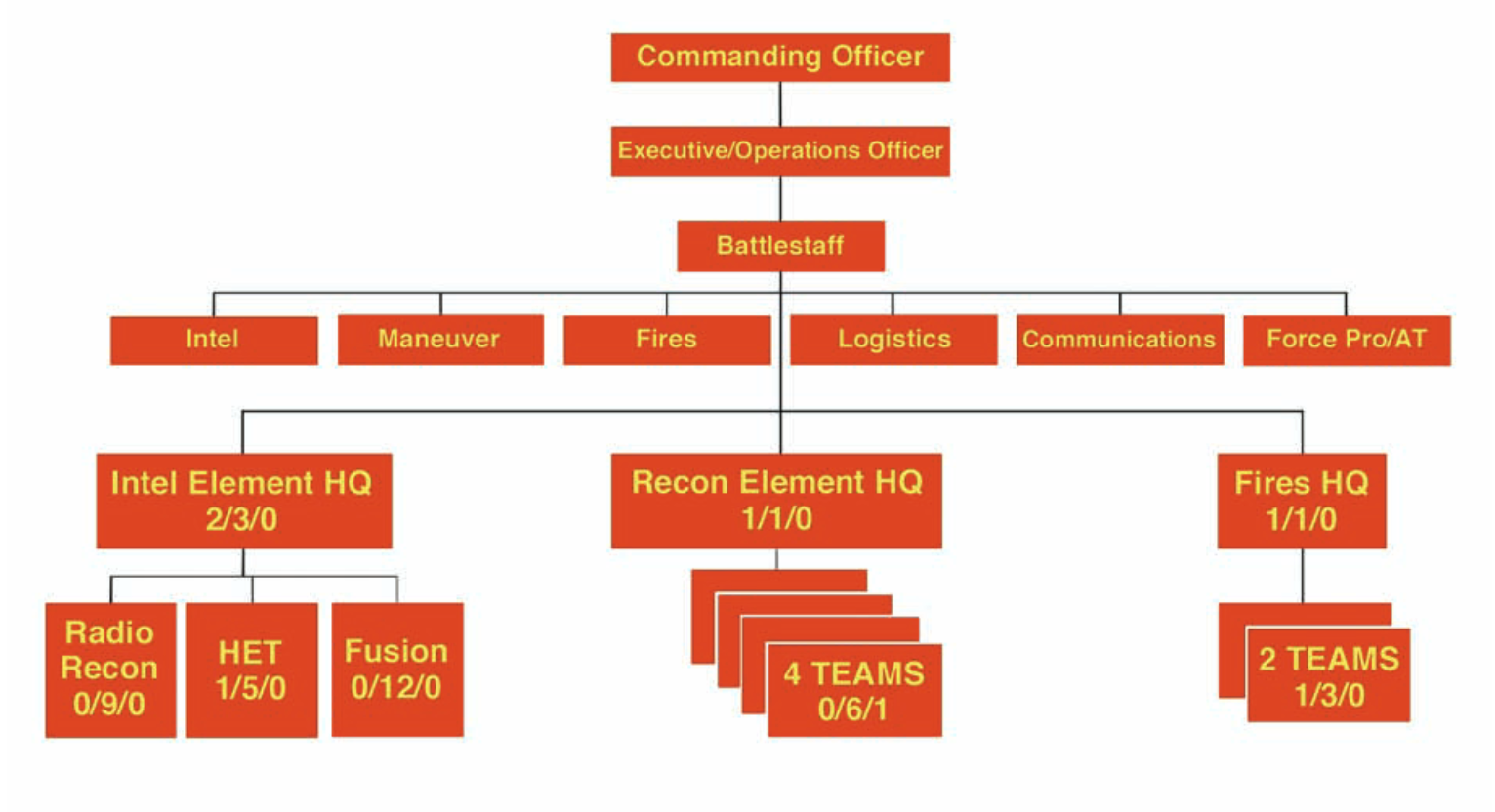
The original structure and manning levels for the Marine Corps Special Operations Command Detachment (Det One) for its deployment to Baghdad, Iraq, in 2004.

Det One's intelligence element was designed to include the full range of intelligence capabilities required for independent or joint special operations, with a particular emphasis on signals intelligence and human intelligence. A three-man signals intelligence support team and a nine-man radio reconnaissance team, the latter led by Master Sergeant Hays B. Harrington, provided the detachment's signals intelligence capability.

Then-Major Melvin "Jerry" Carter, a mustang who had been part of the initial radio reconnaissance effort during his enlisted years, was brought on board as the intelligence officer and intelligence element leader. Major Carter recognized the need for telecommunications equipment that would endow the detachment with the ability to deploy worldwide without having to levy other units for bandwidth or support. To this end, Major Carter secured Trojan Spirit Lite systems, which the detachment modified to allow for extra connectivity with national agencies and separate links with unclassified email and voice systems. This capability set the detachment apart as the only one of its kind in the Marine Corps at the time.

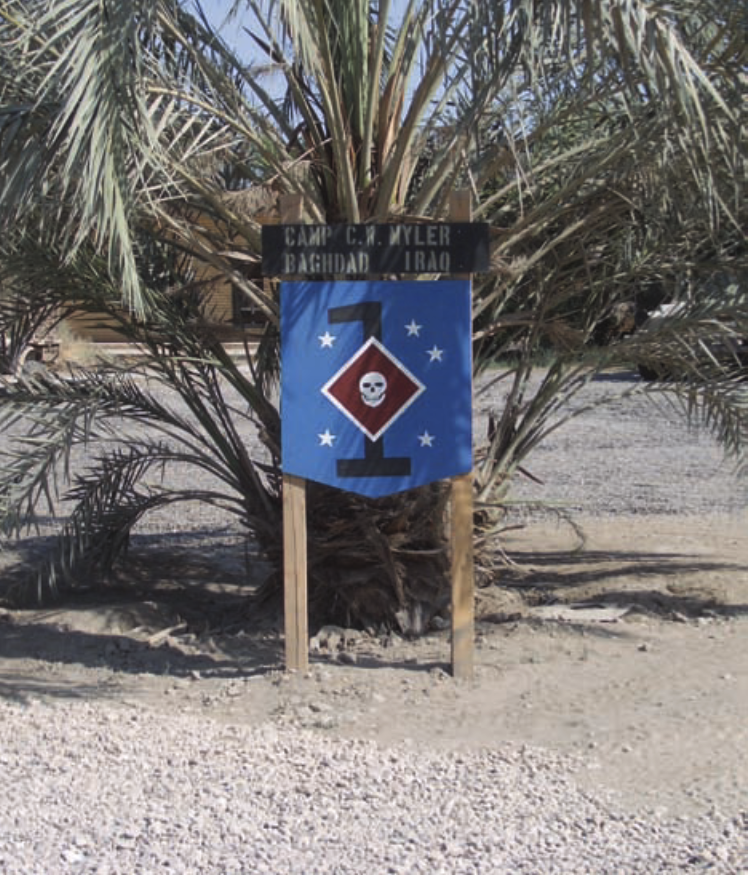
The sign for Det One's compound in Baghdad was named in honor of Sergeant Christian W. Myler and reflected the insignia of the Marine Raiders of World War II.

Det One was officially activated in a ceremony at Camp Del Mar, Camp Pendleton, on 20 June 2003, with 89 Marines present in formation. It deployed to Iraq on 6 April 2004, establishing a base of operations near Baghdad International Airport, where it would integrate with Naval Special Warfare Task Group Arabian Peninsula as Task Unit Raider. Det One's intelligence element was assessed as having no peer among other organizations in theater at the time, save for the high-tier USSOCOM units.

The detachment redeployed to Camp Pendleton in October 2004 and conducted sustainment training while its future was deliberated at the service level. On 6 February 2006, Marine Corps Bulletin 5400 directed the deactivation of the detachment no later than 1 April 2006. The deactivation ceremony was held at Camp Del Mar on 10 March 2006; approximately two dozen Det One Marines received orders to the newly established Marine Forces Special Operations Command.

==== Iraq ====
2d Radio Battalion provided signals intelligence support during the 2003 invasion of Iraq. The battalion's command element was among the units assigned to 2nd Marine Expeditionary Brigade (2d MEB) under then Brigadier General Richard F. Natonski, which constituted the ground combat element of the invasion force alongside the 1st Marine Division. Intelligence reports generated by human sources and signals intelligence during the Battle of Nasiriyah contributed to targeting decisions, including the identification of a large assembly of Iraqi irregular forces near the railway station south of the southwestern bridge.

During the Second Battle of Fallujah in November 2004, 2d Radio Battalion played an active role in advance of the assault. Then Major General Natonski, commanding the 1st Marine Division, later described the SIGINT collection effort as integral to the shaping operation: whenever a feint or new tactic was attempted against Fallujah, "it was always important to make sure that 2d Radio Battalion was collecting," as enemy responses to stimuli such as low-level aircraft passes or illumination rounds would activate command and control networks that the battalion could then exploit. Simultaneously, SIGINT collection supported targeting efforts against the Abu Musab al-Zarqawi network operating within Fallujah.

==== Afghanistan ====
Radio Battalion detachments supported Marine operations in Afghanistan throughout the duration of the War in Afghanistan. The longterm Marine ground presence in southwestern Afghanistan began in early 2008 with the arrival of 2d Battalion, 7th Marines (Task Force 2/7) in Helmand Province; among its reinforcements was a radio battalion detachment providing SIGINT support. Radio Battalion SIGINT capabilities were also provided to allied forces under International Security Assistance Force (ISAF), supporting more than twelve major commands including British, Dutch, Romanian, Canadian, Belgian, and Australian forces.

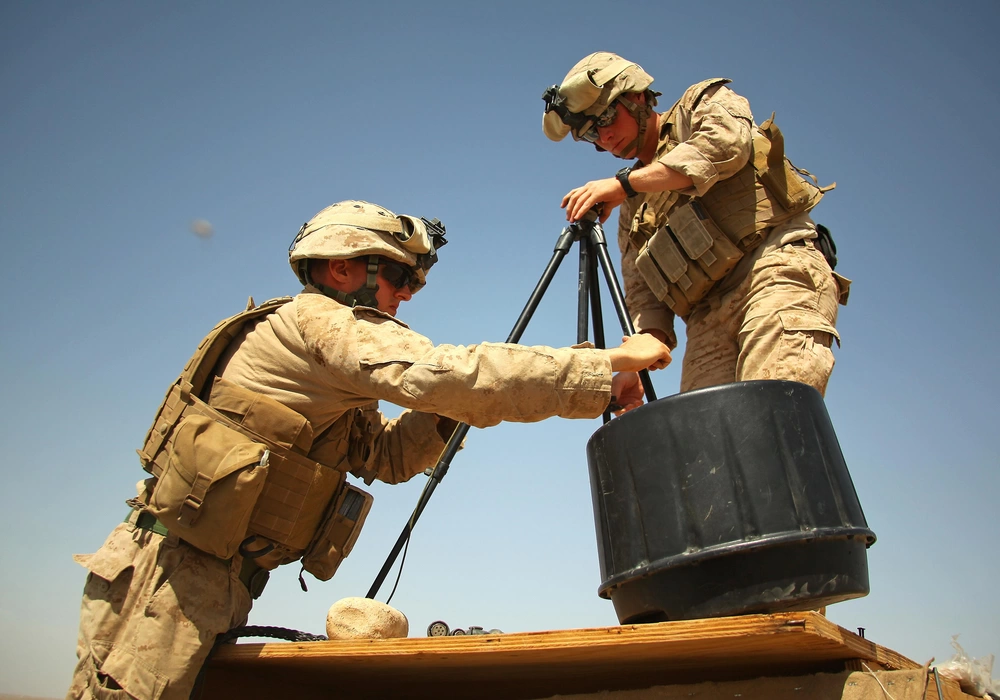
Two 2d Radio Battalion cryptologic linguists assigned to Task Force Belleau Wood, Operational Control Element 2, set up a collection antenna system in Helmand Province, Afghanistan, on 8 May 2011.

From 2010 through 2014, 1st and 2d Radio Battalions maintained alternating forward deployment rotations in support of I MEF (Forward) and II MEF (Forward) under ISAF Regional Command – Southwest. In 2014, as Marine forces drew down, 1st Radio Battalion (Forward) remained assigned to Marine Expeditionary Brigade-Afghanistan as part of the final Marine command element in the country.

On 5 February 2011, Corporal Lucas T. Pyeatt, a Russian-language cryptologic linguist assigned to 2d Radio Battalion, was killed in action in Helmand Province, only two weeks after arriving in country. Pyeatt was posthumously promoted to Sergeant and awarded the National Intelligence Medal for Valor, presented to his family on 29 June 2011, by then-Director of National Intelligence James Clapper. In 2019, the Marine Corps Detachment at the Presidio of Monterey dedicated its new barracks to Pyeatt in recognition of his service.

=== Current Operations and Posture ===
Throughout the 2000s and into the present day, Radio Battalion personnel have deployed in support of various regional operations, humanitarian responses, relief missions, and international joint training exercises. Additionally, each Radio Battalion assigns personnel to MEU Command Elements, with 1st Radio Battalion supporting the 11th, 13th, and 15th MEUs, 2d Radio Battalion supporting the 22nd, 24th, and 26th MEUs, and 3d Radio Battalion supporting the 31st MEU, the only permanently forward-deployed MEU.

== See also ==
- List of United States Marine Corps battalions
- Signals intelligence
- Electronic warfare
- Marine Expeditionary Force
- I Marine Expeditionary Force
- II Marine Expeditionary Force
- III Marine Expeditionary Force
- Defense Language Institute
- National Security Agency
