= Dimitri Henry =

U.S. Marine Corps general

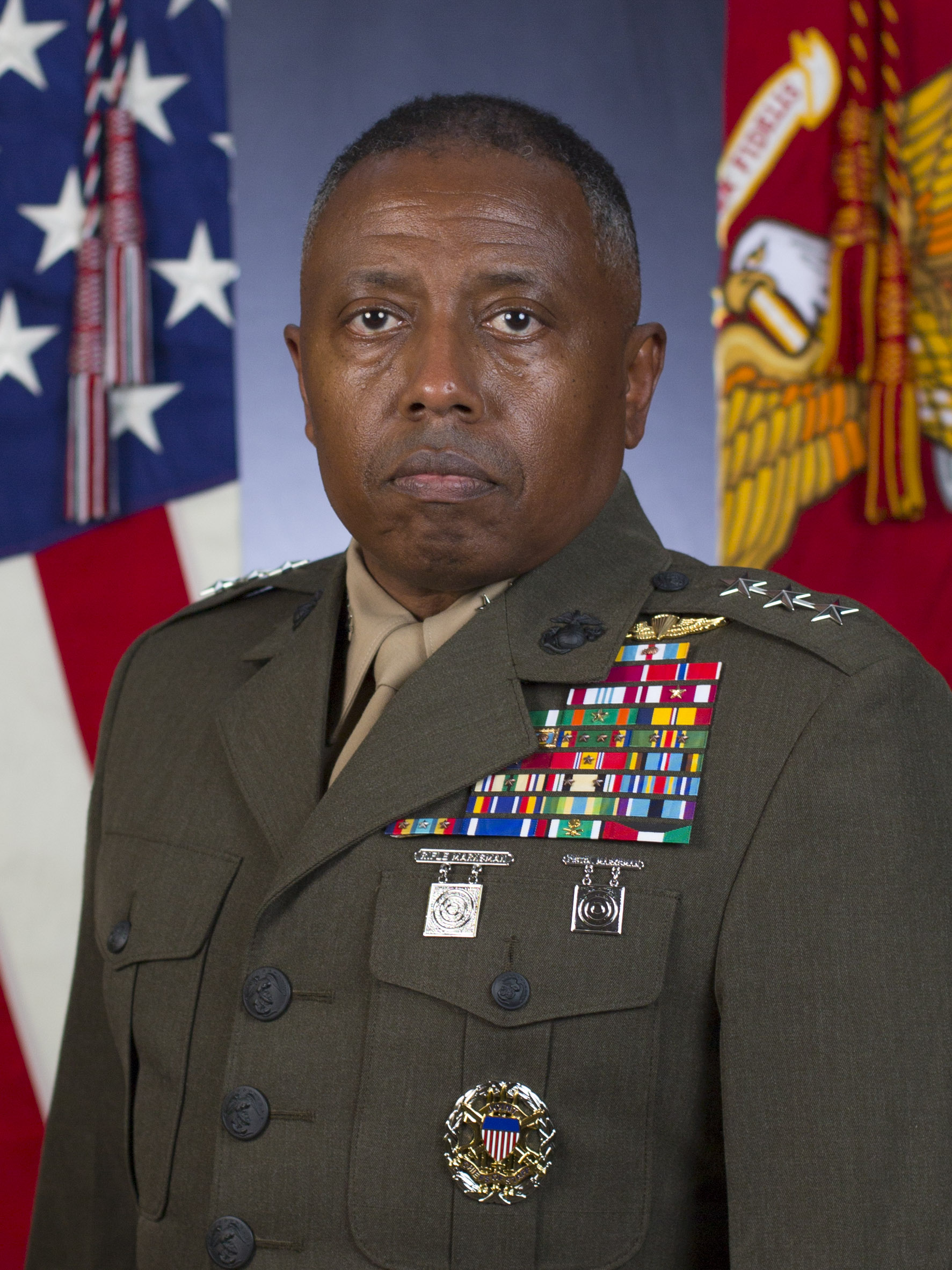
- Official portrait, 2022
- Education: Texas A&M University; Naval Postgraduate School (MS)
- Military career
- Allegiance: United States
- Branch: United States Marine Corps
- Service years: 1981–2025
- Rank: Lieutenant General
- Awards: Defense Superior Service Medal (2); Legion of Merit; Bronze Star

Dimitri Henry is a retired United States Marine Corps lieutenant general who last served as the Director of Intelligence of the Joint Staff. He previously served as the Director of Intelligence of the United States Central Command and before that as the Director of Intelligence of the United States Marine Corps.

== Military career ==
Dimitri Henry enlisted in the Marine Corps in 1981 and attained the rank of SSgt. before graduating from Texas A&M University in 1988 and being commissioned a 2nd Lt.

He served as the Commanding Officer, Co H, Marine Cryptologic Support Battalion, San Antonio, TX, from 2001 to 2004. He went on to serve as Director Marine Corps Intelligence 2017–2019.

As a Lieutenant Colonel, Henry commanded 1st Radio Battalion from 2006 to 2008 during which time the Radio battalion made two deployments to Iraq.

In April 2022, Henry was nominated for promotion to lieutenant general and appointment as director for intelligence of the Joint Staff. His promotion ceremony was held on 19 May 2022.

LtGen Henry retired on 26 June 2025 as the current longest serving Marine on active duty with 44 years of continuous active service.

Military offices
Preceded by William H. Seely III	Director of Intelligence of the United States Marine Corps; 2017–2019	Succeeded by Melvin G. Carter
Preceded by Karen H. Gibson	Director of Intelligence of the United States Central Command; 2019–2022	Succeeded by Nicholas M. Homan
Preceded by Frank D. Whitworth III	Director of Intelligence of the Joint Staff; 2022–2025	Succeeded by Thomas M. Henderschedt
