= Paul W. Brier =

United States Marine Corps general

Major General Paul W. Brier
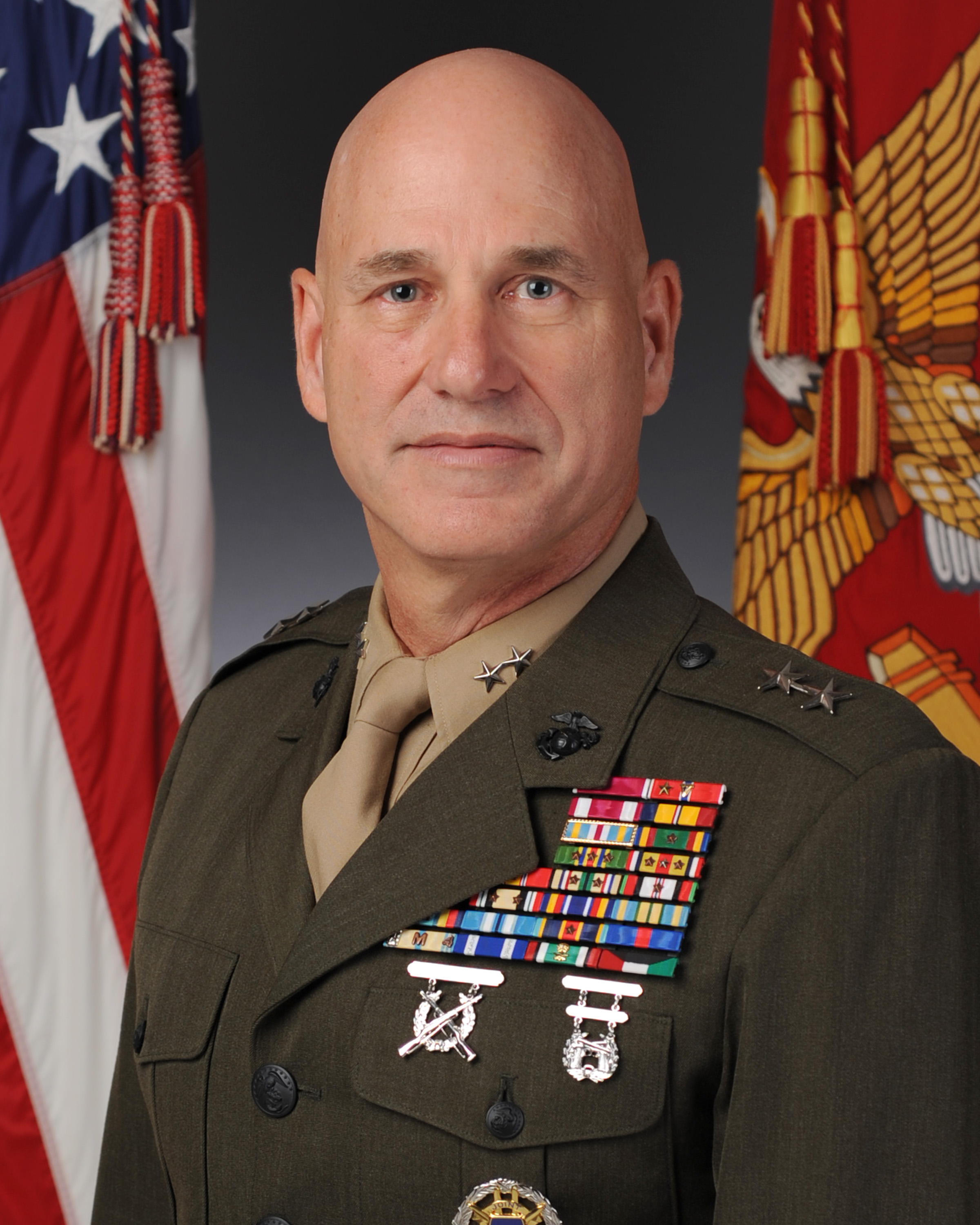
- Brier, USMC, in 2015
- Born: Ft. Ord, Monterey, California, U.S.
- Spouse: Rhonda Johnston Brier
- Military career
- Allegiance: United States
- Branch: United States Marine Corps
- Service years: 1981–2016
- Rank: Major General
- Commands: U.S. Marine Corps Forces Europe; U.S. Marine Corps Forces Africa; 4th Marine Division; 6th Civil Affairs Group; 3rd Battalion, 14th Marines
- Conflicts: Gulf War: Operation Desert Shield; Operation Desert Storm; Iraq War: Operation Iraqi Freedom; War in Afghanistan: Operation Enduring Freedom; Operation Freedom's Sentinel; Libyan Civil War: Operation Odyssey Dawn
- Awards: Navy Distinguished Service Medal; Defense Superior Service Medal; Legion of Merit; Bronze Star Medal with Combat V (2); Meritorious Service Medal

Paul W. Brier is a retired United States Marine Corps major general. A combat veteran of the Persian Gulf, Iraq, and Afghanistan wars, he retired on 31 December 2016, completing 36 years of military service. He holds a BS in Civil Engineering from the Virginia Military Institute and a Master of Strategic Studies from the U.S. Army War College. A 2012 CAPSTONE Fellow at the National Defense University, he is a graduate of the Defense Resources Management Institute, Naval Postgraduate School; Air War College; Joint Forces Staff College; and Marine Corps Command and Staff College.

== Early life and education ==
The son of a career Marine jet pilot and veteran of WWII, Korean, and Vietnam Wars, BGen George R. Brier, he was born on September 21, 1959, at Fort Ord, California. An Eagle Scout, he graduated from St. Stephen's School Alexandria, Virginia, and attended the Virginia Military Institute on the four-year Navy ROTC Scholarship (Marine Option) program, graduating in 1981 with a BS in Civil Engineering.

== Military service ==
He was commissioned a second lieutenant in the United States Marine Corps on May 15, 1981. After completing The Basic School and the U.S. Army Field Artillery Officer Basic Course, his first operational assignment was with the 7th Marine Amphibious Brigade, 29 Palms, California.

In 1984 he transferred to the 12th Marine Corps District for duty as the Officer Selection Officer, Seattle.

While a captain, he served in the 4th Marine Division as Executive Officer, Company "B," 4th Tank Battalion in Yakima, Washington, and as Commanding Officer, Battery "H", 3rd Battalion, 14th Marines, Richmond, Virginia. During his command of Battery H, the unit mobilized and attached to 1st Battalion, 11th Marines, 1st Marine Division, I Marine Expeditionary Force (MEF), and conducted combat operations with Task Force Papa Bear during Operation Desert Shield and Operation Desert Storm in Saudi Arabia and Kuwait.

Promoted to major in 1993, he joined the 4th Civil Affairs Group as a Civil Affairs Team Commander, where he supported the 24th Marine Expeditionary Unit (Special Operations Capable) and the U.S. Atlantic Command Joint Overseas Training Program in Jamaica and the Bahamas.

In 1996, Brier was assigned as the Operations Officer and Executive Officer, 3rd Battalion, 14th Marines, and deployed the battalion to northern Norway for NATO Exercises Strong Resolve 98.

Upon promotion to lieutenant colonel in 1998, he transferred to the II MEF Augmentation Command Element and served as II Marine Expeditionary Force Current Operations Fires Officer for a second winter deployment to Norway for NATO Exercise Battle Griffin 99.

In 2000, Brier assumed command of 3rd Battalion, 14th Marines.

In 2002, he transferred to the U.S. Joint Forces Command for duty as Chief, Civil Affairs Branch, Joint Warfighting Center.

Promoted to colonel in 2003, he served at the Pentagon as a Marine Corps Service Planner, Joint Staff Branch, where he assisted the Commandant of the Marine Corps in preparing for meetings of the Joint Chiefs of Staff. In July 2004, he graduated from the International Joint Operations Planning Course at HMS Dryad (Southwick Park, England).

In February 2005, Brier was selected to build and command the 6th Civil Affairs Group (6th CAG), a provisional unit commissioned for service in Operation Iraqi Freedom. The 6th CAG provided civil affairs support for the 2d Marine Division and Multi-National Force West’s counterinsurgency operations in al-Anbar province during Operations Sayeed II, Steel Curtain, Liberity Express and Patriot Shield II and for two major national elections; the 15 Nov 2005 National Constitutional Referendum and the 15 December 2006 Parliament Elections.

In 2007, Brier was assigned as Chief of Staff, 2d Marine Division.

In 2008, he deployed to Afghanistan and served as Officer-in-Charge, US Marine Forces Central Command (MARCENT) Coordination Element- Afghanistan; and MARCENT Liaison Officer to CJTF-101, Combined Security Assistance Force-Afghanistan, and NATO’s International Security Assistance Force. He held this position until selected by the Commandant of the Marine Corps to redeploy to Guam in July 2008 to establish a permanent Marine Liaison Office to coordinate the move of Marine personnel and facilities from Okinawa to the island required by the Defense Policy Review Initiative (DPRI (2005)), a bilateral force-posture realignment program between the U.S. and Japanese governments. He assisted the Governor of Guam and his government in developing the island’s civil infrastructure plans to support a thirty-percent increase in population caused by the planned relocation about 8,000 Marines and 9,000 dependents from Okinawa to Guam by 2014, estimated to cost $15 billion.

Promoted to Brigadier General in 2009, Brier commanded U.S. Marine Corps Forces Europe and U.S. Marine Corps Forces Africa.

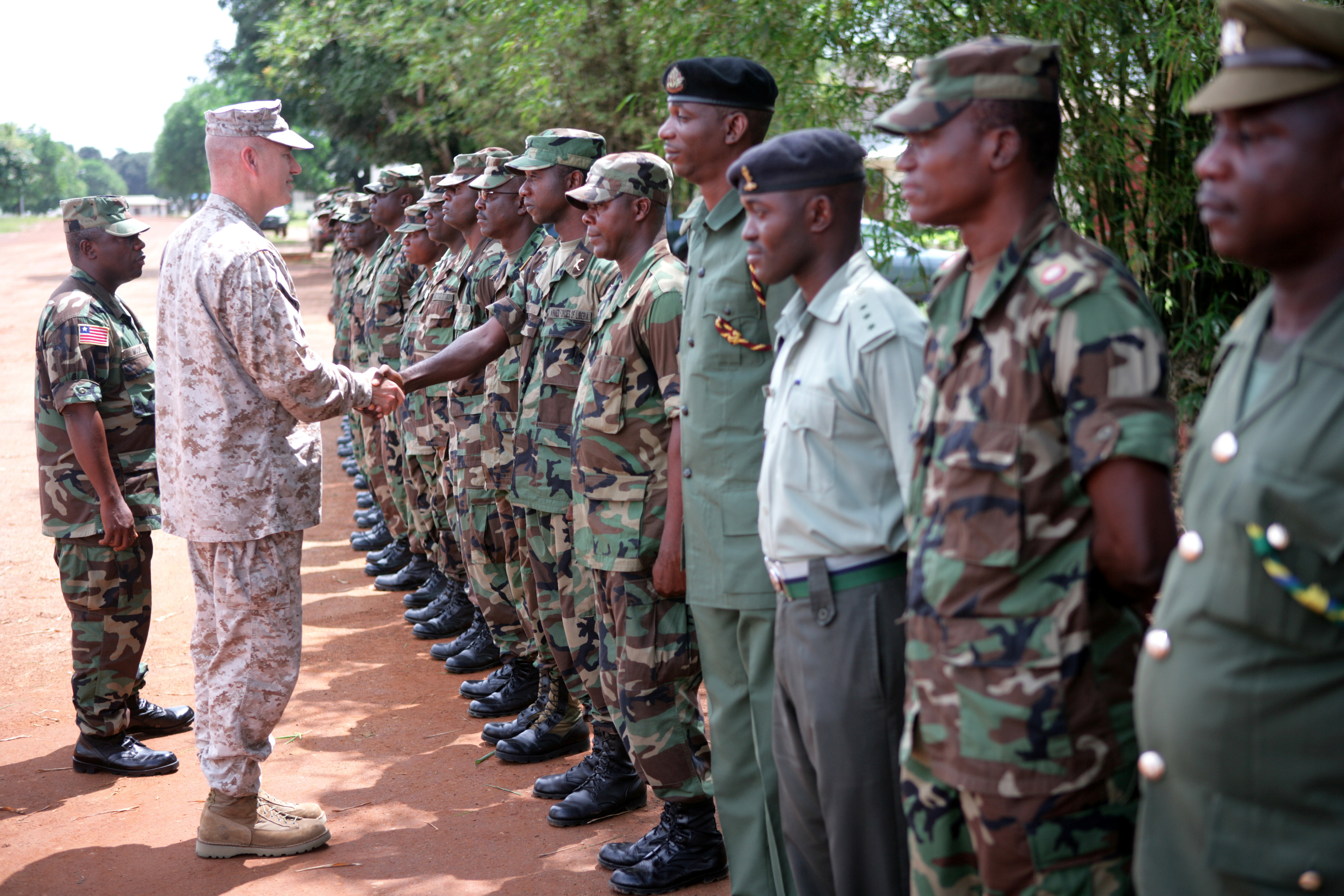
Sept 9, 2010. Monrovia, Liberia. United States Marine Brig. Gen. Paul W. Brier, Commander, U.S. Marine Forces Africa, shakes hand with a recently commissioned officer in the Armed Forces of Liberia. Brier visited Monrovia to gauge the progress of Operation ONWARD LIBERTY, a U.S. Department of State and U.S. Department of Defense initiative designed to continue the United States' support to the government of Liberia and the ongoing reform of its defense sector.

In 2011, he served at sea aboard the USS Mount Whitney (LCC-20) as the deputy commander of the Joint Force Maritime Component Command (Operation Odyssey Dawn), a naval task force which included the USS Kearsarge Expeditionary Strike Group and the 26th Marine Expeditionary Unit, and conducted contingency operations in Libya and the Mediterranean Sea.

Brier was promoted to major general in 2013 while serving as the vice commander, U.S. Marine Corps Forces Command, Norfolk, Virginia.

As a Major General, Brier served at the Pentagon as the Assistant Deputy Commandant for Plans, Policies, and Operations, before taking command of the 20,000 Marines and sailors of the 4th Marine Division. On July 16, 2015, Battery M, 3rd Battalion, 14 Marines, 4th Marine Division was attacked by a domestic terrorist in Chattanooga.

In 2016, he returned from his final tour in Afghanistan where he had served as the Deputy Commander for Civil Outreach and Director of the Advise and Assist Directorate for the 41-nation NATO-led Resolute Support Mission (Operation Freedom’s Sentinel).

== Post military service ==
He serves as the Assistant Circuit Executive for Space and Facilities for the U.S. Courts of the Fourth Circuit and volunteers as a Navy 44 Offshore Skipper/coach/mentor for the U.S. Naval Academy's Command and Seamanship (Offshore Sail Training) Squadron and as a U.S. Coast Guard Auxiliarist.

== Awards and decorations ==

Navy Distinguished Service Medal	Defense Superior Service Medal	Legion of Merit	Bronze Star Medal with valor device & 2nd award star
Meritorious Service Medal	Combat Action Ribbon	Joint Meritorious Unit Award	Navy Unit Commendation with two bronze service stars
Navy Meritorious Unit Commendation with 3 service stars	Selected Marine Corps Reserve with 7 service stars	National Defense Service Medal with service star	Southwest Asia Service Medal with 2 service stars
Afghanistan Campaign Medal with service star	Iraq Campaign Medal with 2 service stars	Global War on Terrorism Service Medal	Military Outstanding Volunteer Service Medal
Sea Service Deployment Ribbon with service star	Navy Arctic Service Ribbon	Navy and Marine Corps Overseas Service Ribbonwith service star	Marine Corps Recruiting Service Ribbon
Armed Forces Reserve Medal with silver hourglass, "M" and numeral "4" device	NATO Medal Non-Article 5 for the ISAF and RS	Kuwait Liberation Medal (Saudi Arabia)	Kuwait Liberation Medal (Kuwait)
Expert Rifle Badge		Expert Pistol Badge (several awards)	
Joint Chiefs of Staff Identification Badge

Military offices
Preceded by MajGen Scott S. Hartsell	Commanding General, 4th Marine Division; 2014 – 2015	Succeeded by BGen Paul K. Lebidine
Preceded by MajGen Tracy L. Garrett	Commander, U.S. Marine Corps Forces Europe; 2009 – 2010	Succeeded by LtGen Dennis J. Hejlik
Preceded by MajGen Tracy L. Garrett	Commander, U.S. Marine Corps Forces Africa; 2009 – 2011	Succeeded by LtGen John M. Paxton, Jr.
