= General Garrett =

General Garrett may refer to:

- Michael X. Garrett (born 1961), U.S. Army four-star general
- Ragnar Garrett (1900–1977), Australian Army lieutenant general
- Robert Garrett (British Army officer) (1794–1869), British Army lieutenant general
- Tracy L. Garrett (fl. 1970s–2010s), U.S. Marine Corps Reserve major general
- William B. Garrett III (fl. 1980s–2010s), U.S. Army lieutenant general

== See also ==
- Isham Warren Garrott (1816–1863), Confederate States Army colonel set to be promoted to brigadier general, but killed in action before the promotion occurred
