= United States Marine Corps Forces Europe and Africa =

U.S. Marine Corps Forces Europe and Africa
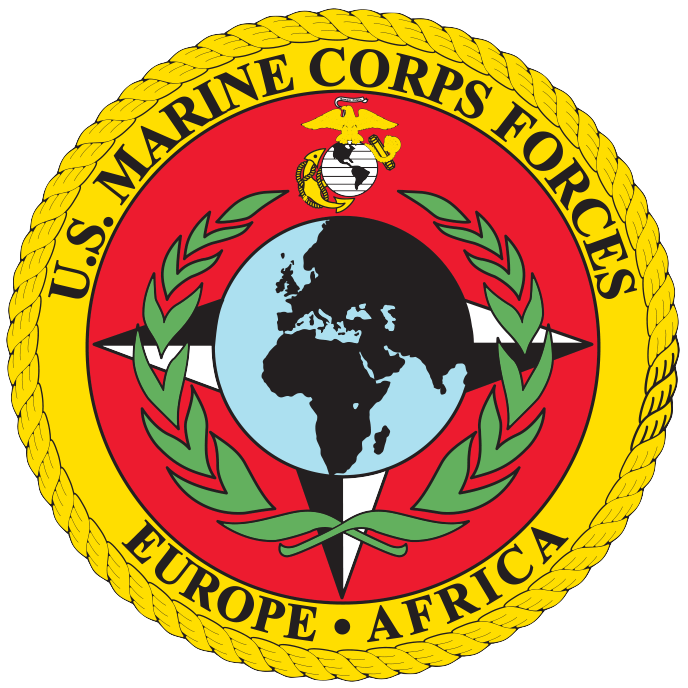
- Active: February 1980 – present (as Fleet Marine Force Europe)
- Country: United States
- Branch: U.S. Marine Corps
- Type: Service component
- Role: Headquarters element
- Size: 1,500+
- Part of: United States European Command
- Garrison/HQ: Panzer Kaserne, Böblingen, Germany

Commanders
- Current commander: MajGen Daniel Shipley
- Notable commanders: Stephen M. Neary; Russell A. Sanborn; John M. Paxton Jr. Paul W. Brier

Insignia
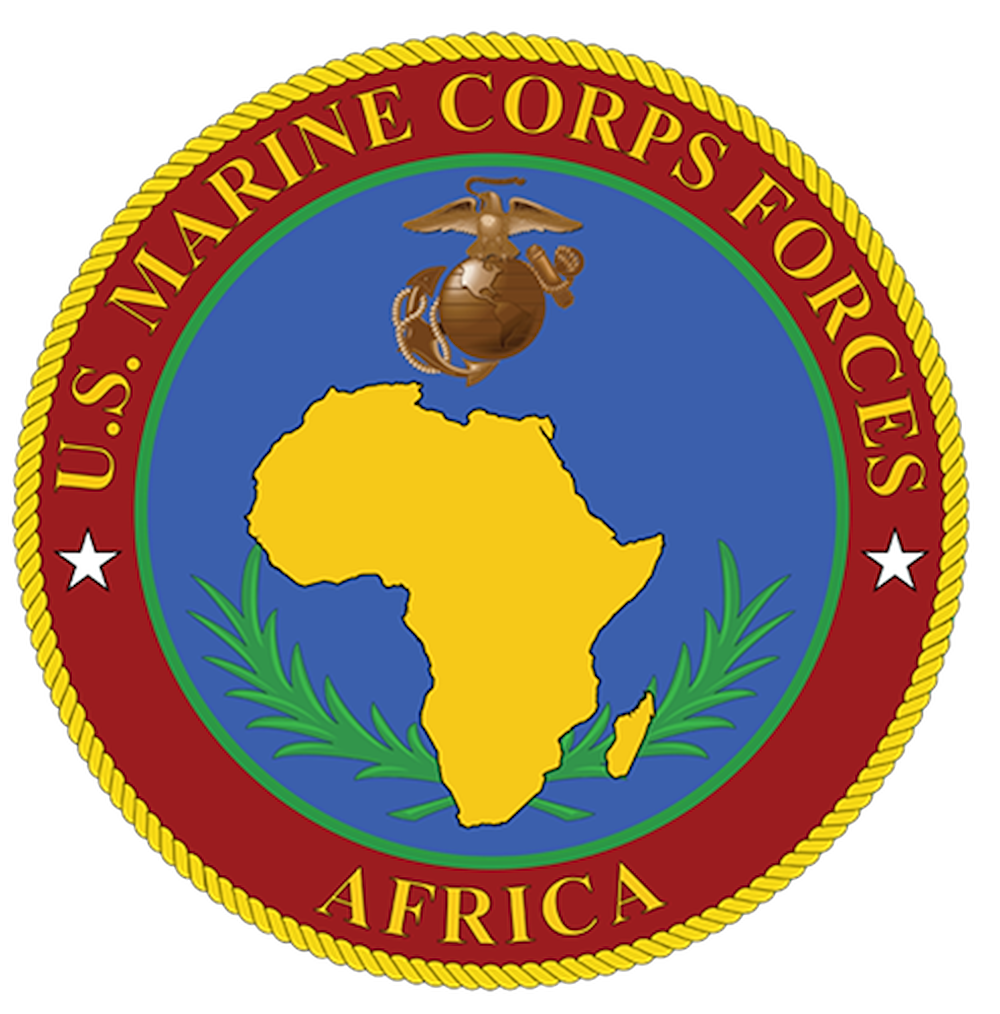
- Seal of Marine Corps Forces Africa

The Marine Corps Forces Europe and Africa (abbreviated as MARFOREUR/AF), headquartered in Panzer Kaserne-Barracks in Böblingen, Germany, is the U.S. Marine Corps component of the U.S. European Command and U.S. Africa Command.

== History ==
In February 1980 the Commandant of the Marine Corps and the Chief of Naval Operations revised the operational task sharing between the two branches in a memorandum. Hitherto the USMC had a supporting role within United States Naval Forces Europe (NAVEUR). When that agreement came into effect on July 1, 1980, Headquarters, Fleet Marine Force Europe, the predecessor of the present unit, was founded in London including an independent 40-person staff as a Designed Component Command, to act as a Command Unit for further formations to be put under EUCOM-Command in case of a crisis situation. That staff immediately began preparing operation plans for optimal replenishment and deployment when required. FMF Europe arranged Marine support for Operation Provide Comfort, Operation Provide Promise, and Operation Deny Flight. To meet increasing challenges better, headquarters were transferred to Böblingen near Stuttgart on November 8, 1993. In February 1994 the headquarters was renamed MARFOREUR.

MARFOREUR is now dual-hatted with Marine Corps Forces Africa as Marine Corps Forces Europe / Africa, since November 2008.

== Organization ==
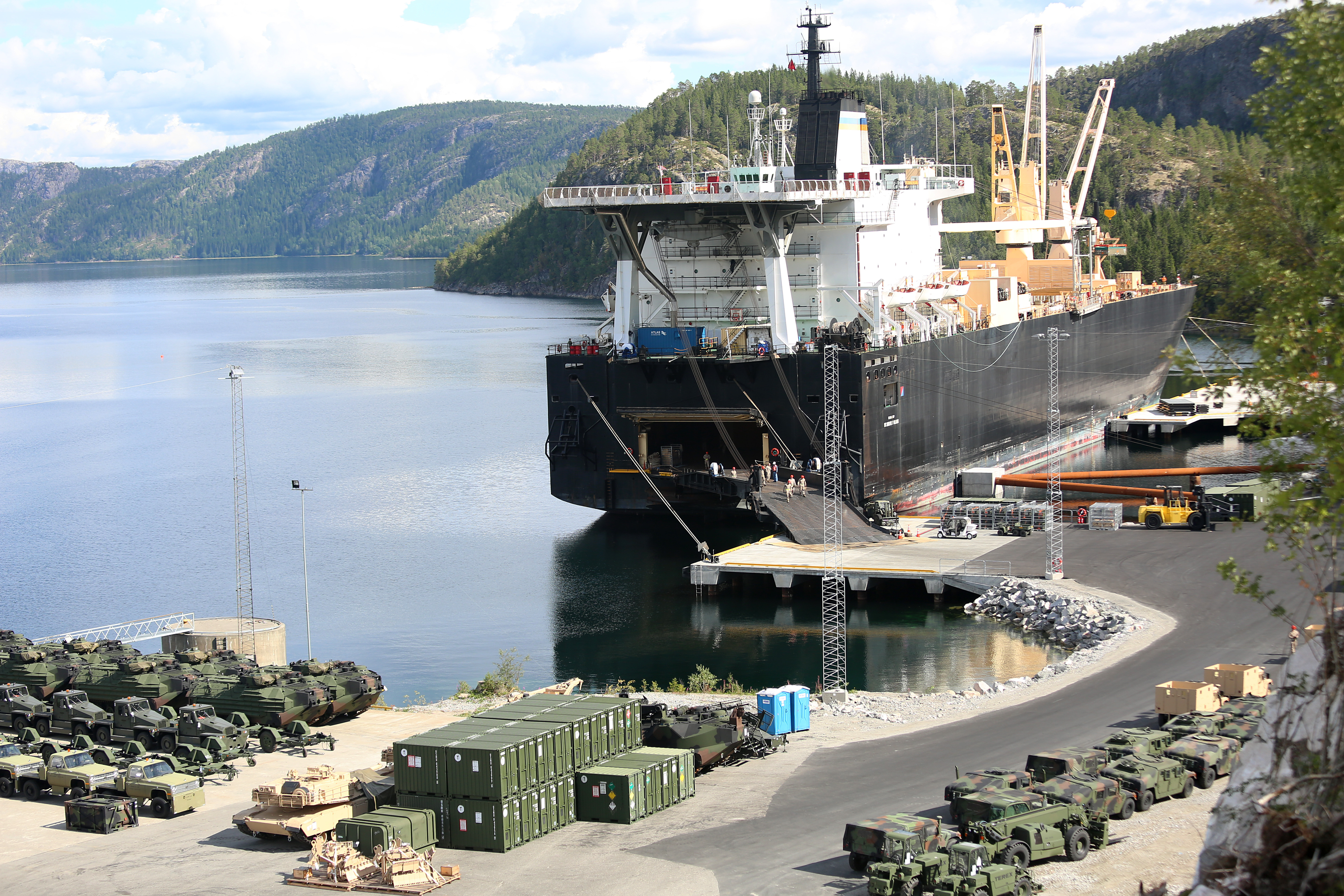
Vehicles and equipment being offloaded in 2014 as part of the modernization of the US Marine Corps materiel stored in Norway

Currently, MARFOREUR/AF has a manning level of more than 1,500 Marines, of which about 100 serve at headquarters in Böblingen.

MARFOREUR/AF serves as a headquarters and liaison organization for USMC efforts in the EUCOM area of responsibility. In normal circumstances Marine elements in the theater are few – routinely, the Marine Expeditionary Unit attached to United States Sixth Fleet, and possibly other small units and detachments. Yet the HQ makes it possible to call upon forces from II Marine Expeditionary Force (II MEF), based at Camp Lejeune, North Carolina. This force comprises the 2nd Marine Division, the 2nd Marine Aircraft Wing, and the 2nd Marine Logistics Group, formerly known as the 2nd Force Service Support Group.

II MEF would also supply forces for the Norway Air-Landed Marine Expeditionary Brigade (NALMEB). NALMEB is a remnant NATO Cold War reinforcement organization, and would have come under command of Allied Forces Northern Europe. Significant equipment storage for a MEB is located in northern Norway under the Marine Corps Prepositioning Program-Norway, and administered in the contiguous United States by Blount Island Command. The Norwegian Government has integrated the presence of a MEB into its defense planning.

Yet the tasking is now more theoretical than real, as the last confirmed deployment was Exercise Battle Griffin in 1991, in which the 2nd Marine Expeditionary Brigade, made up from USMCR reserve units due to Operation Desert Storm, made the first test of the concept. The exercise was conducted in February and March 1991 and the Brigade was made up of the 25th Marines regimental headquarters, 3rd Battalion, 25th Marines (infantry), Company E, 4th Reconnaissance Battalion, and 1st Battalion, 14th Marines (artillery).

In 2014 the USMC added heavy armored vehicles to NALMEB for the first time.

As of January 2017, a rotational force of about 330 (infantry) U.S. Marines from Camp Lejeune, NC, are stationed in Trondheim, Norway on two six-month deployments. Official MARFOREUR writings say that the Marine Rotational Force, Europe (MRF-E) comprises "an infantry company reinforced by enablers and a Marine Coordination Element. [Their] presence in Norway facilitates military exercises that support NATO and USEUCOM operational plans; increases interoperability with Allies and Partners; advances efforts for more naval integration; and enables recuperation of the Marine Corps' cold weather and mountain proficiencies."

== List of commanders ==
No.	Commander		Term			Ref
No.	Portrait	Name	Took office	Left office	Term length	Ref
Commanding General FMFEUR / II MEF / FMFLANT
1	Adolph G. Schwenk	Lieutenant General; Adolph G. Schwenk (1922–2004)	1 October 1980	1 July 1982	1 year, 273 days	
2	John H. Miller	Lieutenant General; John H. Miller (1925–2025)	1 July 1982	1 September 1984	2 years, 62 days	
3	Alfred M. Gray Jr.	Lieutenant General; Alfred M. Gray Jr. (1928–2024)	1 September 1984	1 July 1987	2 years, 303 days	
-	Clayton L. Comfort	Major General; Clayton L. Comfort (1930–2004); Acting	1 July 1987	1 September 1987	62 days	
4	Ernest T. Cook Jr.	Lieutenant General; Ernest T. Cook Jr. (1935–2000)	1 July 1987	1 July 1990	3 years, 0 days	
5	Carl E. Mundy Jr.	Lieutenant General; Carl E. Mundy Jr. (1935–2014)	1 July 1990	25 June 1991	359 days	
Commander MARFOREUR / MARFORSOUTH / MARFORLANT / Commanding General FMFLANT / II MEF
6	William M. Keys	Lieutenant General; William M. Keys (1937–2026)	25 June 1991	1 September 1994	3 years, 68 days	
7	Robert B. Johnston	Lieutenant General; Robert B. Johnston (1937–2023)	1 September 1994	August 1995	334 days	
8	Charles E. Wilhelm	Lieutenant General; Charles E. Wilhelm (born 1941)	August 1995	23 November 1997	2 years, 114 days	
Commander MARFOREUR / MARFORSOUTH / MARFORLANT / Commanding General FMFLANT
9	Peter Pace	Lieutenant General; Peter Pace (born 1945)	23 November 1997	8 September 2000	2 years, 290 days	
10	Raymond P. Ayres	Lieutenant General; Raymond P. Ayres (born 1944)	8 September 2000	15 August 2002	1 year, 341 days	
11	Martin R. Berndt	Lieutenant General; Martin R. Berndt (born 1941)	15 August 2002	15 August 2005	3 years, 0 days	
Commander MARFOREUR / MARFORSOUTH / MARFORCOM / Commanding General FMFLANT
12	Robert R. Blackman Jr.	Lieutenant General; Robert R. Blackman Jr. (born 1948)	15 August 2005	18 July 2007	1 year, 337 days	
Commander MARFOREUR/AF
13	Cornell A. Wilson Jr.	Major General; Cornell A. Wilson Jr.	18 July 2007	30 September 2008	1 year, 74 days	
14	Tracy L. Garrett	Brigadier General; Tracy L. Garrett	30 September 2008	10 September 2009	345 days	
15	Paul W. Brier	Brigadier General; Paul W. Brier	10 September 2009	17 August 2010	341 days	
Commander MARFOREUR/AF / MARFORSOUTH / MARFORCOM / Commanding General FMFLANT
16	Dennis Hejlik	Lieutenant General; Dennis Hejlik	17 August 2010	20 July 2012	1 year, 338 days	
17	John M. Paxton Jr.	Lieutenant General; John M. Paxton Jr. (born 1951)	20 July 2012	13 December 2012	146 days	
-	W. Blake Crowe	Brigadier General; W. Blake Crowe (born 1967); Acting	13 December 2012	28 June 2013	197 days	
18	Richard T. Tryon	Lieutenant General; Richard T. Tryon (born c. 1954)	28 June 2013	1 July 2014	1 year, 3 days	
19	Robert B. Neller	Lieutenant General; Robert B. Neller (born 1953)	1 July 2014	23 September 2015	1 year, 84 days	
Commander MARFOREUR/AF
20	Niel E. Nelson	Major General; Niel E. Nelson	23 September 2015	July 2017	1 year, 281 days	
21	Russell A. Sanborn	Major General; Russell A. Sanborn	July 2017	7 July 2019	2 years, 6 days	
22	Patrick Hermesmann	Major General; Patrick Hermesmann	7 July 2019	July 2020	~360 days	
23	Stephen M. Neary	Major General; Stephen M. Neary	July 2020	20 October 2020	~111 days	
24	Michael Langley	Major General; Michael Langley (born 1961)	3 November 2020	6 May 2021	184 days	
25	Tracy W. King	Major General; Tracy W. King	6 May 2021	30 June 2023	2 years, 55 days	
26	Robert Sofge	Major General; Robert Sofge	30 June 2023	3 July 2025	2 years, 3 days	
27	Daniel L. Shipley	Major General; Daniel L. Shipley	3 July 2025	Incumbent	1 year, 65 days	

== See also ==
- Black Sea Rotational Force
- Special Purpose Marine Air-Ground Task Force – Crisis Response – Africa
- Cornell A. Wilson Jr.
- Operation Odyssey Dawn
