= 14th Marine Regiment (United States) =

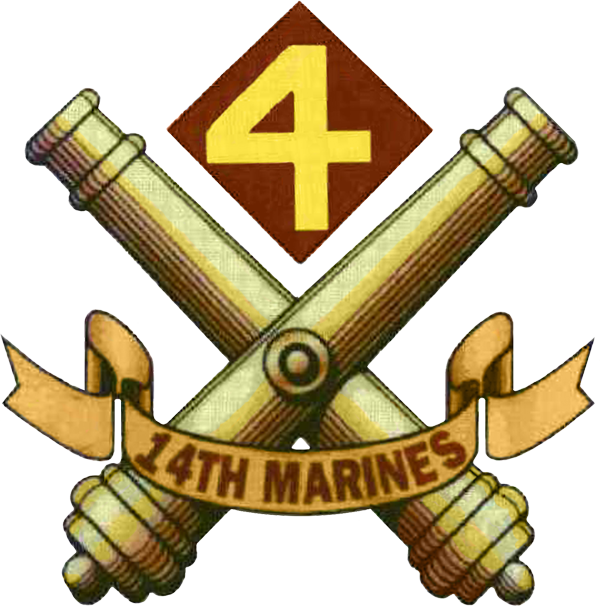
- 14th Marines insignia
- Active: November 26, 1918 – June 19, 1919; June 1, 1943 – November 20, 1945; February 1, 1966 – present
- Country: United States of America
- Branch: United States Marine Corps
- Type: Artillery
- Role: Provide fire in support of 4th Marine Division
- Part of: 4th Marine Division; Marine Forces Reserve
- Garrison/HQ: Fort Worth, Texas
- Engagements: World War II; Battle of Kwajalein; Battle of Saipan; Battle of Tinian; Battle of Iwo Jima; Operation Desert Storm; War in Iraq

Commanders
- Current commander: Colonel Keith W. Richardson
- Notable commanders: Randall M. Victory; Louis G. DeHaven

The 14th Marine Regiment (14th Marines) is a reserve artillery regiment of the United States Marine Corps consisting of three artillery battalions and a headquarters battery. The regiment is based in Fort Worth, Texas however its units are dispersed among 15 different sites in 12 states. Its primary weapon system is the M777A2 Howitzer with a maximum effective range of 30 km however one of its battalions has converted to fire the High Mobility Artillery Rocket System (HIMARS) weapon system.

== Mission ==
14th Marine Regiment provides the Marine Air Ground Task Force (MAGTF) with a Force Artillery Headquarters in order to command, control, and coordinate Force Artillery delivered fires. On order, 14th Marines assumes the civil military operations mission for the MAGTF with focus on coordinating and achieving unity of effort among all forces and non-military organizations participating in stability operations in the MAGTF's battle space.

== Organization ==
- Headquarters Battery, 14th Marines (HQ Battery) – Fort Worth, Texas
- 2nd Battalion, 14th Marines (2/14 "Two Fourteen") – Grand Prairie, Texas
- 3rd Battalion, 14th Marines (3/14 "Three Fourteen") – Bristol, Pennsylvania
- 5th Battalion, 14th Marines (5/14 "Five Fourteen") – Seal Beach, California
- Communications Company 14th Marines – Cincinnati, Ohio
  - I&I Detachment, Communications Company, 14th Marines - Fort Benjamin Harrison, Indianapolis

== History ==
=== World War I ===
The 14th Marine Regiment was activated at Marine Corps Base Quantico, Virginia, on November 26, 1918. It was created to replace the 10th Marine Regiment, an artillery unit, that was being sent to Indian Head Proving Grounds in Maryland to transition to new tractor-mounted 7-inch (180 mm) naval guns. The 14th Marines had a headquarters detachment and ten artillery batteries divided into three battalions. Each battery was allotted four officers, twenty-four non-commissioned officers, and seventy-five privates. About one-third of their number comprised a cadre of trained artillerymen left behind by the 10th Regiment, the remainder were newly minted Marines fresh from recruit training or part of the pool of men available for overseas deployment.

Throughout this initial tenure, the regiment remained at MCB Quantico and was armed with carriage-mounted Navy 3-inch (76 mm) landing guns. These guns had been developed by the Naval Weapons Factory at the turn of the 20th century. Unfortunately, these guns and their ammunition were not compatible with contemporary U.S. Army field guns. Training days consisted of three intervals. Mornings were devoted to normal military duties and infantry drill, afternoons were used for gun drills and technical training, in the evenings junior enlisted men cared for the more than one hundred horses and mules assigned to the regiment.

As part of the massive demobilization of the American military following the signing of the treaties ending World War I, the 14th Marine Regiment was deactivated in June 1919 and would remain inactive until the Second World War.

=== World War II ===
The 14th Marine Regiment was reactivated on June 1, 1943, under the command of Lieutenant Colonel Randall M. Victory as the part of 4th Marine Division. The regiment was divided in two echelons for basic training. First Echelon, consisting of 1st and 3rd Battalions, was located at Camp Lejeune, North Carolina. Second Echelon (2nd and 4th Battalions) was located at Camp Pendleton, San Diego.

On June 7, 14th Marines received new Commanding officer, Colonel Louis G. DeHaven, who succeeded Lt. Colonel Victory. Randall M. Victory was subsequently appointed Regimental Executive Officer.

Regiment arrived in Pacific Theater on January 30, 1944, and subsequently participated in the Battle of Kwajalein

=== Gulf War: Operation Desert Shield and Operation Desert Storm ===
In November 1990, Battery H, commanded by Capt. Paul W. Brier, and Battery I were two of four reserve artillery batteries mobilized to augment active component formations during the Gulf War. They deployed to Camp Lejeune, North Carolina, in December, and subsequently deployed to Saudi Arabia in January 1991. Battery H was attached to 1st Battalion, 11th Marines, 1st Marine Division, and Battery I to 10th Marine, 2d Marine Division, becoming parts of Task Force Papa Bear and Task Force Ripper, respectively, for the ground assault on 24 February through two obstacle belts and subsequent operations to liberate Kuwait from Iraqi forces. These active component augmentations were necessary as both of these artillery regiments were lacking one of their organic direct support artillery batteries, as they each had a battery attached to embarked and deployed Marine Expeditionary Units.

On 25 February, Battery H engaged, with direct howitzer fire, and destroyed an Iraqi mobility rocket launching system at a range of 800m, which was subsequently found to be in the center of an Iraqi brigade of D20 152mm howitzers. Battery H had just occupied an exposed firing position, having received multiple shelling which significantly wounded one cannoneer, Sgt. Chris LaCivita. The 8-gun battery's 1000m by 700m position was on the far side of the second obstacle belt, well in front of the tank and infantry maneuver units it supported, with the burning Burqan oil field to its immediate east. This positioning far forward of the forward line of troops was selected to support the 1st Marine Division's northward momentum and Task Force Papa Bear's continued and rapid assault into Kuwait City.

The battery was laid on an azimuth of fire to the north, when it received a battalion mass fire mission on a target 30 km to its south. Unknown the battery's Marines, an Iraqi Brigade was launching a counterattack through the burning oil field on 1st Marine Division Command Post. On battery's east flank piece (Gun #1) Gunner Sgt Shawn Toney and Section Chief Sergeant Thomas Stark, IV, spotted two enemy multiple rocket launchers as they were shifted trails to fire to the south. They engaged and destroyed launchers with heavy automatic weapons and direct fire from their M198 155mm howitzer, while the rest of the battery continued to support the fire mission to the south and defend the battery position from ground assault.

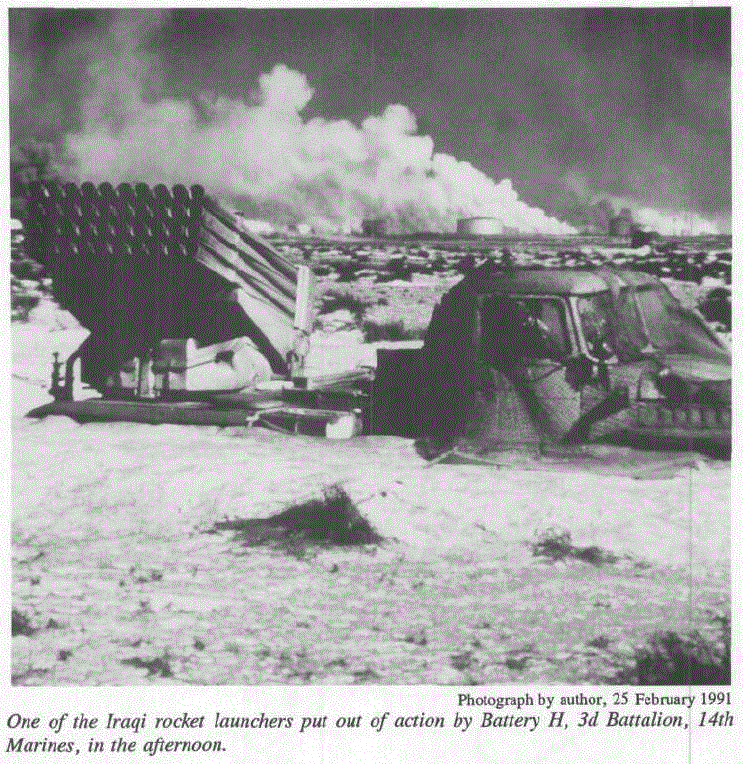
One of the Iraqi rocket launchers destroyed by Battery H, 3rd Battalion, 14th Marines, at the al Burqan Oil Field, Kuwait, 25 February 1991.

LtCol. Jay Sollis, 1/11 Commander, arrived in the battery position, requested air support and directed a section of AH-1W Sea Cobra to engage the Iraqi counterattack force in the oil field.[7]

On the night of 25 February, the Battalion CP occupied a new position in support of Task Force Papa Bear. A security patrol, which included Lance Corporal Troy L. Gregory of Battery H, was organized to investigate an enemy bunker adjacent to the new CP position. While conducting this patrol, Gregory stepped on an Iraqi land mine and was critically wounded. Despite quick evacuation to a Naval Hospital, he died the following day of his wounded, just a few days before his 21st birthday. He was posthumously awarded the Purple Heart Medal and Combat Action Ribbon and was laid to rest at Arlington National Cemetery in section 60, Grave 7723. The Navy-Marine Corps Reserve Center in Richmond was renamed in his honor.

Battery H's final position was just south of the Kuwait International Airport when the ceasefire was announced. The Battery subsequently retrograded to the 1st Marine Division Support Area in Saudi Arabia. In April, the battery redeployed to the United States and was released from active duty.

=== War in Iraq ===
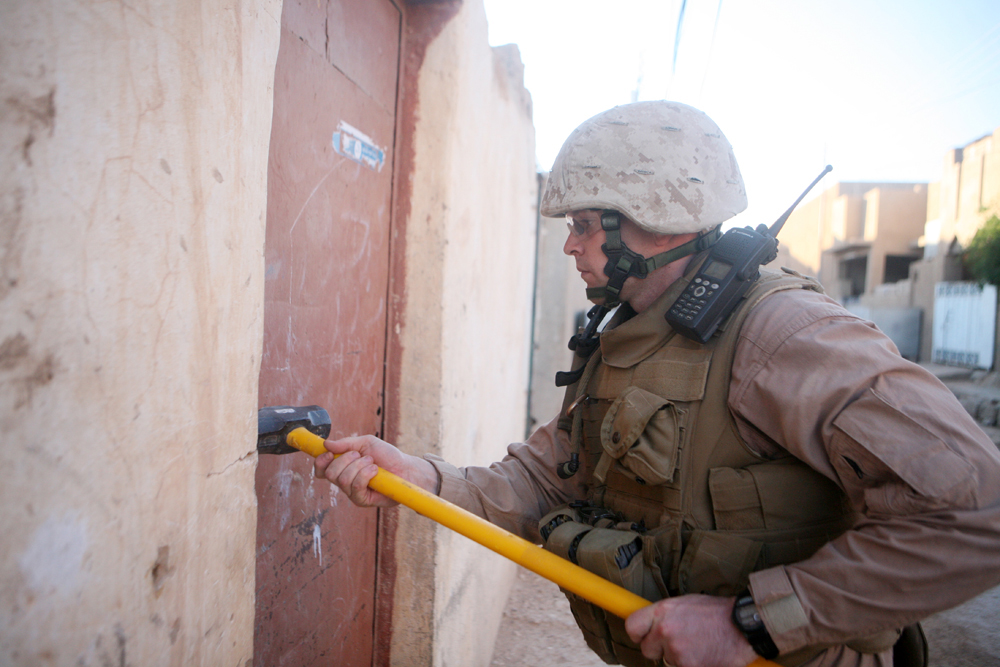
A Marine with Battery M, 3/14 hammers a door during a cache search in Rutbah, Iraq.

In 2004, Mike Battery, out of Chattanooga, Tennessee deployed to Fallujah, Iraq and took part in Operation Phantom Fury to re-take the insurgent-held city.

They later deployed again in 2007 and became part of the Marine-led Multi-National Force - West. During this second deployment, they were attached to 2nd Light Armored Reconnaissance Battalion, Regimental Combat Team 5 and operated in the vicinity of Ar Rutbah under the callsign, "Excalibur". In 2007, the unit suffered one casualty Cpl Dustin J. Lee.

=== 2015 Chattanooga shootings ===
On July 16, 2015, four Marines with Mike Battery's Inspector-Instructor staff were killed by a gunman who was embarking on a shooting spree targeting military installations. In addition, a sailor died from his wounds two days later.

Some of the 3/14 Marines killed in action were reportedly killed while returning fire at the gunman, providing cover for a larger group of potential victims who were escaping over a fence. They were identified as:

Name	Age	Hometown	Branch	Rank
Carson A. Holmquist	25	Grantsburg, Wisconsin	Marine Corps	Sergeant
Thomas J. Sullivan	40	Springfield, Massachusetts	Marine Corps	Gunnery Sergeant
Squire K. "Skip" Wells	21	Marietta, Georgia	Marine Corps	Lance Corporal
David A. Wyatt	37	Russellville, Arkansas	Marine Corps	Staff Sergeant

In addition, Sergeant DeMonte Cheeley, was shot in the leg.

The Battery Commander during the shootings, Major Mike Abrams, declared during the memorial service that his Marines "were selfless in their efforts to take care of one another, and they acted with unquestionable courage."

MajGen Paul W. Brier, Commanding General of the 4th Marine Division, spoke at the nationally televised press conference held in Chattanooga on 22 July 2015. He praised the Marines and Sailors who risked their lives to help others and stop the gunman. “The legacy that day is one of valor.” "'I can tell you that our Marines reacted the way you would expect,' the major general said. 'Rapidly going from room to room, they got their fellow Marines to safety. Once they had gotten to safety, some willingly ran back into the fight.'"

== Notable former members ==
- Brigadier General Louis G. DeHaven, served as Commanding officer during World War II.
- Major general Randall M. Victory, served consecutively as Regimental Executive officer and Commanding officer during World War II.
- Major General Clifford B. Drake, served as Executive officer, 2nd Battalion during World War II.
- Lieutenant General Joseph C. Fegan Jr., commanded Battery M, 4th Battalion during World War II.
- Brigadier General Frederick J. Karch, served as Major and Regimental Operations officer during World War II.
- Major General Carl A. Youngdale, commanded 4th Battalion during World War II.
- Major General Paul W. Brier commanded Battery H during the Gulf War; 6th CAG during the Iraq War; and, after the September 11 terrorist attacks: 3rd Battalion, 14th Marines; 4th Marine Division; US Marine Forces Europe; and US Marine Forces Africa.
- Corporal Hussein Farrah Aidid, served with the FDC, Battery B, 1st Battalion during the Gulf War.

== See also ==
- Marine Forces Reserve
- History of the United States Marine Corps
- List of United States Marine Corps regiments
