= Cornell A. Wilson Jr. =

United States Marine Corps general

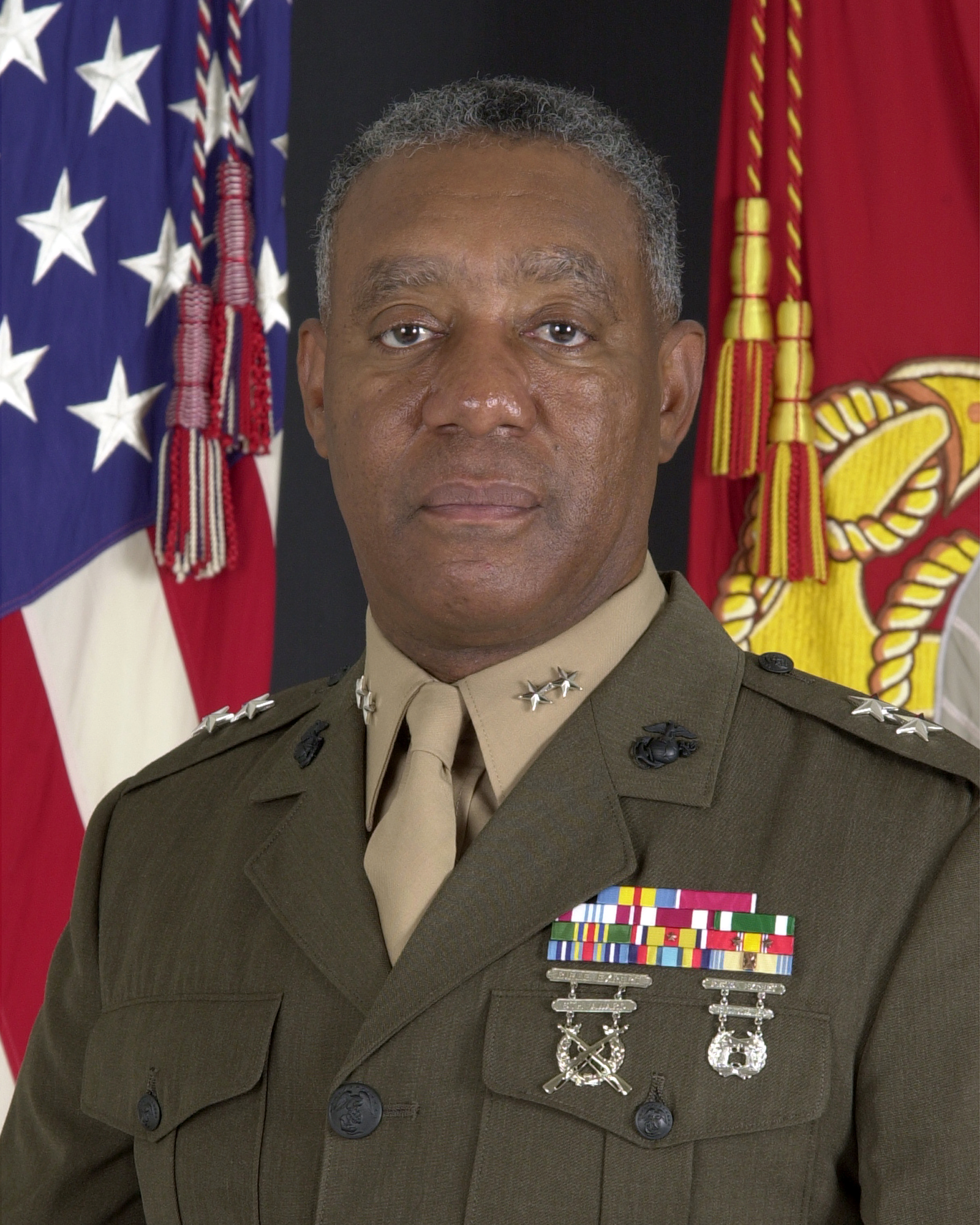
- Military career
- Allegiance: United States of America
- Branch: United States Marine Corps
- Service years: 1972-2010
- Rank: Major General
- Commands: 25th Marine Regiment; 4th Marine Logistics Group; 2nd Marine Expeditionary Brigade; Reserve Affairs Division
- Conflicts: Operation Enduring Freedom; Operation Iraqi Freedom
- Awards: Defense Distinguished Service Medal; Legion of Merit
- Other work: Siemens ICN

Cornell A. Wilson Jr. is a retired United States Marine Corps major general, who served as Director, Reserve Affairs Division, Manpower & Reserve Affairs, Headquarters, U.S. Marine Corps, in Quantico, Virginia.

== Early life and education ==
Wilson's early education was in Hartsville, S.C. He attended kindergarten and elementary school at St. Joseph Academy. His high school years were completed at Butler High School where he graduated as Valedictorian in 1967. Wilson attended the University of South Carolina on an NROTC Scholarship and graduated with a Bachelor of Science degree in Chemistry in 1972. He was commissioned a Second Lieutenant and assigned to The Basic School at Quantico, Virginia, after graduation.

== Career ==
Upon completion of The Basic School and Armor Officer Basic in 1973, Wilson reported to 1st Marine Division, where he served as a Tank Platoon Commander, Company Executive Officer, Battalion Assistant Operations Officer and Tank Company Commander, 1st Tank Battalion.

In 1976, he was assigned to the USS Inchon as the Combat Cargo Officer at Norfolk, Virginia, and transferred to Quantico, Virginia, in 1978 where he served as an advanced tactics instructor at The Basic School. He was selected to attend Amphibious Warfare School in 1979 and following its completion in 1980, reported to 2nd Marine Division. Assigned to the 2nd Tank Battalion, he commanded H&S company and served on the Battalion S-4 staff as maintenance management officer before leaving the active component in 1982.

As a Reserve officer, Wilson served on the Maintenance Battalion staff in Charlotte, North Carolina, before taking command of the Communications Company in Greensboro, North Carolina, in 1985. In 1987, he transferred to the H&S Battalion staff in Marietta, Georgia, and served as the Battalion's Operations Officer and Executive Officer before assuming command of the Battalion in 1990. In 1993, he became the Executive Officer for the 25th Marine Regiment in Worcester, Massachusetts. Upon completing his tour with the 25th Marine Regiment, Wilson served as the Depot Inspector for MCRD Parris Island, South Carolina in 1995 and served as the II MACE G-4 before taking command of 4th Supply Battalion in Newport News, Virginia in 1997. During this tour, he was selected for brigadier general in 1999.

Wilson's first assignment as a general officer was as the deputy commander for MARCENT at U.S. Central Command, Tampa, Florida. Following this tour, he was assigned as the commanding general, 4th Marine Logistics Group in New Orleans, Louisiana. In August 2002, he assumed command of the Augmentation Command Element of the Second Marine Expeditionary Force.

He was selected for major general in 2002. In support of Operation Enduring Freedom, he was activated as the Deputy J-3 for Central Command in Tampa, Florida, from September to December 2002. From February through May 2003, Wilson commanded the Combined Joint Task Force Consequence Management (C/JTF-CM), headquartered in Camp Doha, Kuwait, and supported Operations Enduring and Iraqi Freedom. On July 9, 2004, Wilson assumed command of 2nd Marine Expeditionary Brigade, Camp LeJeune, North Carolina where he served as the MEB commander, Commanding General for II MACE and the Deputy Commander for II MEF. He assumed duties as Director, Reserve Affairs Division, Manpower & Reserve Affairs, Headquarters Marine Corps in July 2005. In July 2007, he was assigned as Commanding General for United States Marine Corps Forces, Europe in Stuttgart, Germany. He assumed his currents duties as Deputy Commander, U. S. Marine Corps Forces Command in October 2008.

Wilson's professional military education includes the Marshall Center Senior Executive Seminar, NATO Defense College General and Flag Officer Course, Senior Information Warfare Application Course, Logtech Executive Course, Revolution in Business Practices, National Defense University's Capstone Course, Naval War College's Strategy and Policy Course, and Amphibious Warfare School.

== Awards and decorations ==
Wilson's personal decorations include:

=== Medals and ribbons ===

	Defense Distinguished Service Medal			Office of the Secretary of Defense Identification Badge
Legion of Merit	Defense Meritorious Service Medal	Meritorious Service Medal	Navy and Marine Corps Commendation Medal	Office of the Secretary of Defense Identification Badge
Joint Meritorious Unit Award	Navy Meritorious Unit Commendation	Selected Marine Corps Reserve Medal w/ 2 service stars	National Defense Service Medal w/ 2 service stars	Office of the Secretary of Defense Identification Badge
Global War on Terrorism Expeditionary Medal	Global War on Terrorism Service Medal	Navy Sea Service Deployment Ribbon w/ 1 service star	Armed Forces Reserve Medal w/ silver hourglass device	Office of the Secretary of Defense Identification Badge
