= Niel E. Nelson =

United States Marine Corps general

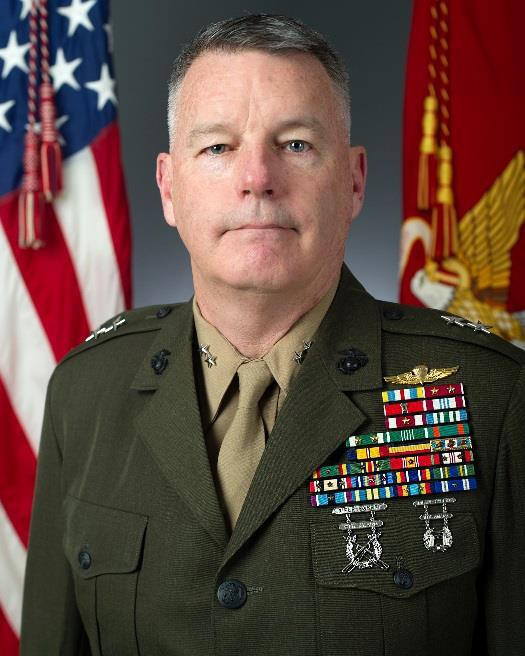
- Born: Fort Knox, Kentucky, U.S.
- Military career
- Allegiance: United States
- Branch: United States Marine Corps
- Rank: Major General
- Nickname: Rick
- Commands: United States Marine Forces Europe and Africa; 3rd Marine Logistics Group; United States Marine Corps Training and Education Command; 8th Engineer Support Battalion
- Conflicts: Iraq War; War in Afghanistan
- Awards: Defense Superior Service Medal; Legion of Merit (3); Bronze Star Medal

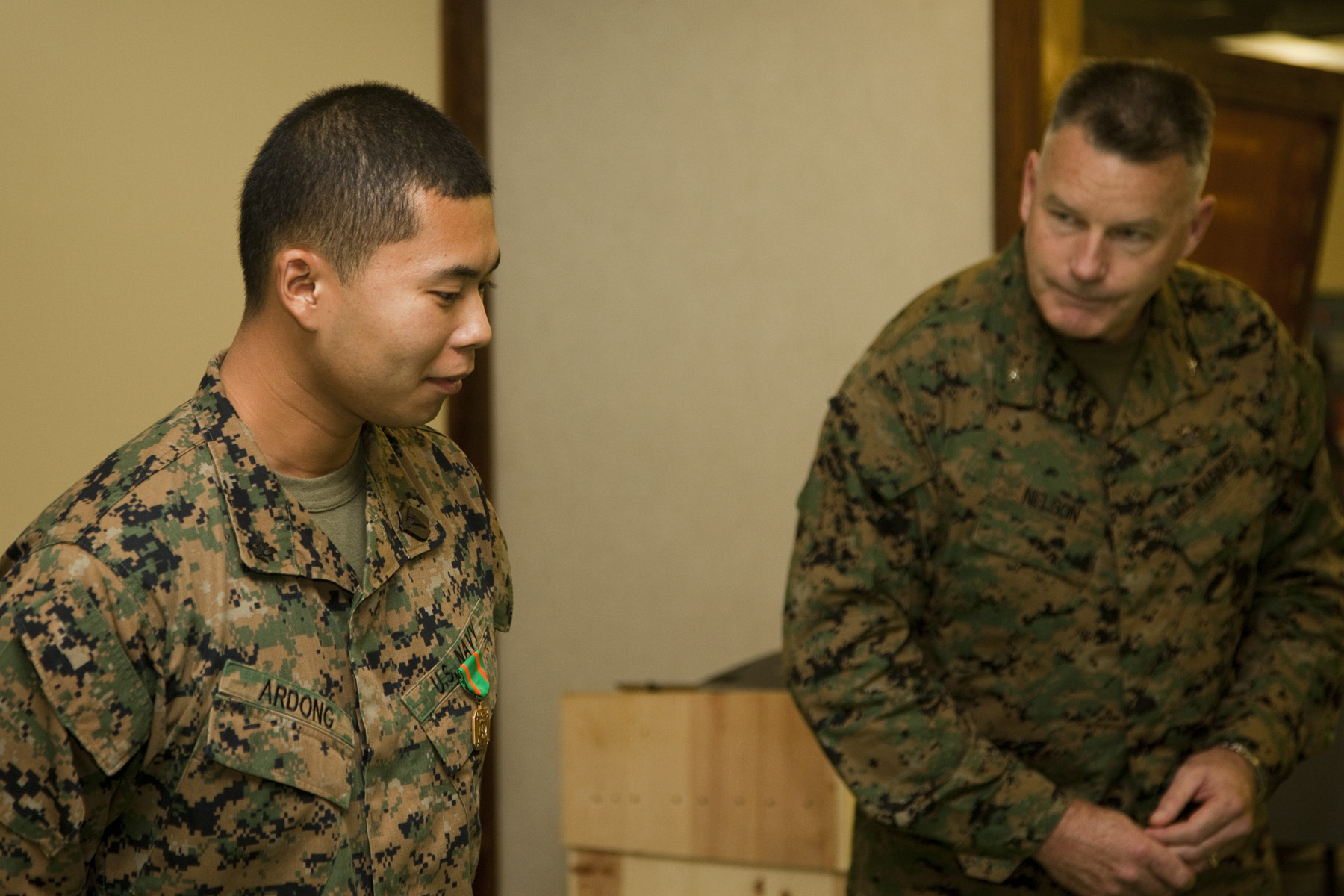
Nelson (right) participates in an award ceremony at Camp Hansen, Okinawa in February 2013

Niel E. "Rick" Nelson is a retired United States Marine Corps major general. He took command of the United States Marine Forces Europe and Africa in 2015. His final assignment before his 2018 retirement was as Assistant Deputy Commandant for Combat Development & Integration and Deputy Commanding General of the Marine Corps Combat Development Command.

== Early life and education ==
Nelson was born in Fort Knox, Kentucky. He graduated from San Diego State University and was commissioned into the United States Army in May 1984.

Nelson was named a Distinguished Graduate of the United States Army Advanced Engineer Officers School; attended Marine Corps Command and Staff College where he received a Masters of Military Science; attended the School for Advance Warfighting; and the United States Army War College, where he received a Master of Science in International and Strategic Studies. Nelson also holds a Master of Science in Systems Management and graduated from the Joint Forces Staff College.

== Military career ==
Nelson's promotion to brigadier general was approved by the United States Senate in May 2011. His subsequent promotion to major general was approved in March 2015.

In 2015 Nelson was awarded the de Fleury Medal in a ceremony held in Kabul. His additional military decorations include the Defense Superior Service Medal; Legion of Merit with two Gold Stars; Bronze Star Medal with V Device; Defense Meritorious Service Medal; Meritorious Service Medal with one Gold Star; Joint Service Commendation Medal; Navy and Marine Corps Commendation Medal with two Gold Stars; Army Commendation Medal and the Navy Achievement Medal.

== Personal life ==
Nelson is the son of Ronald Andrew Nelson (born 26 July 1933) and Kathleen Ann "Kay" (Butler) Nelson (18 November 1936 – 25 October 2019). He has a sister and two brothers. His father retired from the United States Army as a lieutenant colonel and one of his brothers also served in the Marine Corps, retiring as a major.
