= 6th Civil Affairs Group =

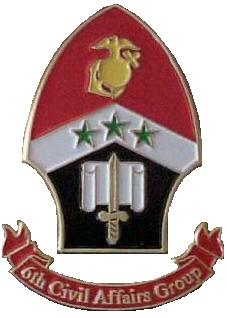
- 6th CAG insignia
- Active: Mar 2005 – Apr 2006
- Country: United States of America
- Branch: United States Marine Corps
- Type: Civil Affairs
- Size: Group composed of: * Headquarter and Liaison elements, * 3 regimental CA detachments of a CA headquarters element and 4 battalion CA teams (CATs) * 1 Government Support detachment which included a Governance Support team, a Provincial Civil-Military Operations Center (CMOC) in ar-Ramadi, and 3 regional CMOCs located in al-Fallujah, al-Qa'im, and al-Hadithah.
- Part of: Multi-National Force West, Multi-National Forces - Iraq
- Garrison/HQ: Camp Blue Diamond (Sep 2005–Jan 2006); Camp Fallujah (Jan - Mar 2006))
- Engagements: Iraq War – Al Anbar campaign * Operation Iraqi Freedom * Operation Sayeed * Operation Steel Curtain * Operation Liberty Express * Operation Doctor * Operation River Gate

Commanders
- Notable commanders: Col. Paul W. Brier

6th Civil Affairs Group (6th CAG) was a United States Marine Corps Civil Affairs unit: organized, trained and equipped on Camp Lejeune, North Carolina from April to September 2005; conducted civil-military operations and civil affairs activities in al-Anbar from September 2005 to March 2006; and redeployed and deactivated in the United States from March to April 2006.

At the beginning of 2005, Marine Corps Commandant, General Michael W. Hagee, decided to establish the 5th and 6th CAGs to provide operational and personnel relief to the Corp's two existing CAGs (3d CAG and 4th CAG), which had been continuously supporting Marine combat and stability operations in Iraq over the preceding three years. The 6th CAG was activated on 1 June 2005, with Col. Paul W. Brier as the Commanding Officer and a cadre of officers and staff NCOs from the 4th Maintenance Battalion, to included its commander, LtCol Helen G. Pratt, as the 6th CAG's Executive Officer.

The 6th CAG deployed to Iraqi on 11 September and conducted a transfer of authority with the 5th Civil Affairs Group on 21 September.

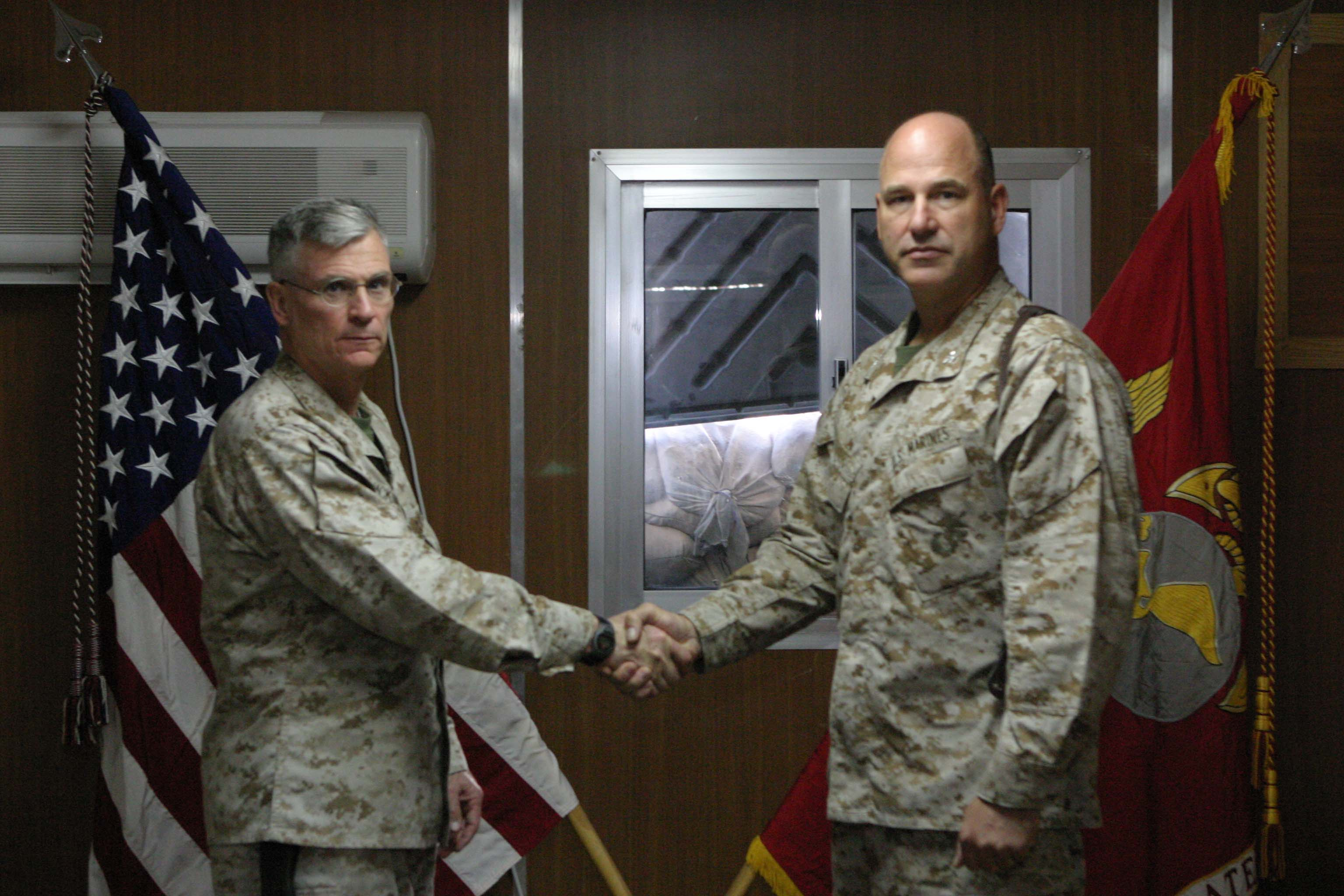
CAMP BLUE DIAMOND, RAMADI, Iraq– Col. Steve McKinley, seen left, commanding officer, 5th CAG transfers of authority to Col. Paul W. Brier, commanding officer, 6th Civil Affairs Group. Official Marine Corps photo by Sgt Ryan S. Scranton. 21 September 2005

Subsequently, the 6th CAG planned and provided civil affairs support for the command and ground combat elements of the 2nd Marine Division and Multi-National Force West in al-Anbar governate during 2005 and 2006. The Group supported operations including Operation Sayeed, Operation Steel Curtain and Operation Liberty Express. The unit was deactivated in April 2006 upon redeployment to the United States.

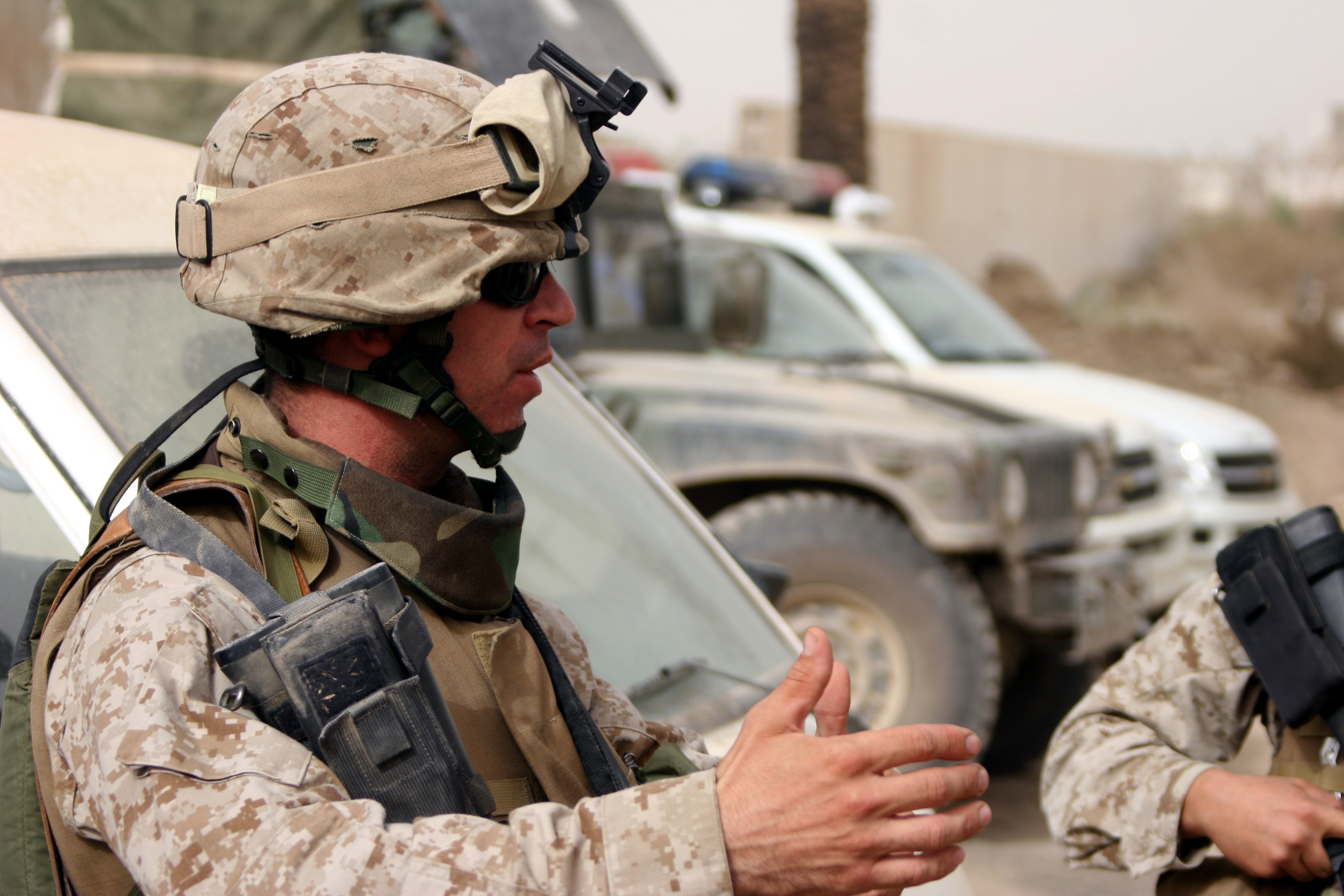
AR RAMADI, Iraq (November 5, 2005) - Major Dan Wagner, team chief for Team 4, 6th Civil Affairs Group, speaks with his Marines before embarking on a patrol through the streets of Ar Ramadi Nov. 5. Photo by Cpl. Shane Suzuki

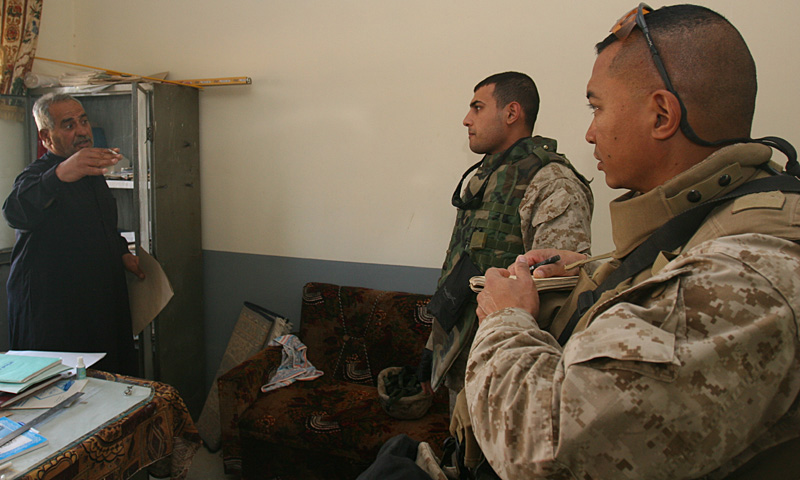
Ali Hassan Mohammed (middle), interpreter with 6th Civil Affairs Group in Husbayah, Iraq, listens intently to interpret the words of an elementary school principal for Lt. Col. Robert Glover. Glover is director of the Civil-Military Operations Center for the Al-Qaim region. The CMOC's mission is to facilitate reconstruction in western Iraq. 7 Dec 2005.

== Mission ==
6th CAG's mission: "Plan and execute civil military operations in support the command and ground combat elements of the 2nd Marine Division and Multi-National Force West during Operation Iraqi Freedom, while serving as the liaison between military forces and civil authorities, the local population and non-governmental organizations. Conduct activities which enhance the relationship between the military and Iraqi personnel and organizations facilitated through application of civil affairs specialty skills in areas normally the responsibility of civil governments. Provide guidance in civil administration, economic development, heath, education, infrastructure restoration, and reconstruction."

== Unit awards ==
A unit citation or commendation is an award bestowed upon an organization for the action cited. Members of the unit who participated in said actions are allowed to wear on their uniforms the awarded unit citation. The 6th Civil Affairs Group has been presented with the following awards:

Streamer	Award	Year(s)	Additional Info
	Navy Unit Commendation Streamer	28 Feb 2006 - 9 Feb 2007 SU I MEF (FWD)	Al Anbar Campaign
	Navy Unit Commendation Streamer	1 Sep 2005 - 28 Feb 2006 SU II MEF (FWD)	Al Anbar Campaign
	National Defense Service Streamer	11 Sep 2001 -	Global war on terrorism
	Iraq Campaign Streamer	Phase 3, Iraq Governance	Iraq War
	Iraq Campaign Streamer	Phase 4, National Resolution	Iraq War
	Global War on Terrorism Service Streamer	11 Sep 2001 -	Iraq War

== See also ==
- Civil affairs
