= Russell A. Sanborn =

U.S. Marine major general

Russell Sanborn
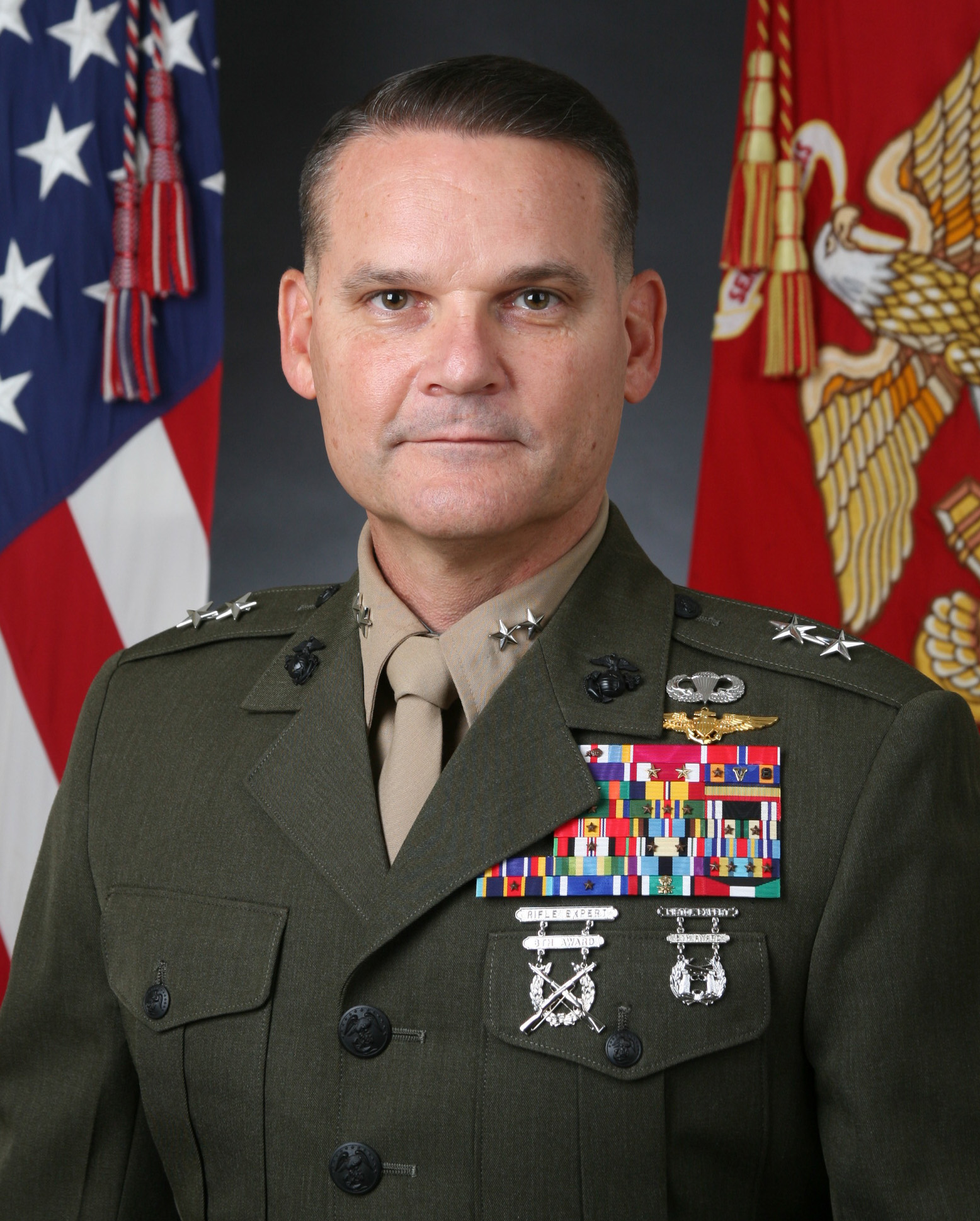
- Military career
- Allegiance: United States of America
- Branch: United States Marine Corps
- Service years: 1986-2019
- Rank: Major General
- Commands: 1st Marine Air Wing; United States Marine Forces Europe and Africa
- Conflicts: Operation Desert Storm; Iraq War
- Awards: Legion of Merit; Bronze Star Medal; Prisoner of War Medal

Russell Sanborn is a retired U.S. Marine major general. Sanborn is a decorated pilot, veteran of the Gulf War and previously served as Commanding General of 1st Marine Air Wing and Commander, United States Marine Forces Europe and Africa. Sanborn was a prisoner of war during Operation Desert Storm.

== Marine Corps career ==
Sanborn was commissioned in the United States Marine Corps as a second lieutenant thru the NROTC after graduation from University of Florida in 1986. He graduated from The Basic School at Marine Corps Base Quantico and was selected for further flight training at NAS Pensacola, Florida. He earned the Naval Aviator badge in 1988 and was subsequently trained to fly the AV-8B Harrier II. Upon completion of training, Sanborn received orders to VMA-231 at Iwakuni Marine Base in Japan and later deployed to Saudi Arabia in 1990 after the Invasion of Kuwait by Iraqi forces. During the Gulf War he was hit by anti-aircraft fire during a bombing raid and was shot down by Iraqi forces on February 9, 1991. He was taken in captivity and imprisoned in central Baghdad, where he was tortured by his captors until his release on March 6, 1991 after 26 days. After 30 days of rehabilitation at Navy National Medical Center, he returned to full duty.

In July 1992 he was assigned as an air liaison officer in the 1st Battalion, 8th Marines. In July 1993, he was stationed in the Marine Attack Squadron 542 (VMA-542) as a member of the new AV-8B Harrier II + aircraft reception team in the Marine Corps. In 1994 he returned to the VMM-231. In 1996 he was assigned to the 26th MEU and sent to the Mediterranean area as an AV-8B Harrier II pilot. He participated in operations in Bosnia and Herzegovina, operations to evacuate American citizens from Albania and in the operations to evacuate civilians from Zaire during First Congo War.

In June 1997, Sanborn was assigned to Naval Air Systems Command in Patuxent River as the Assistant Program Manager for the AV-8B. As a captain, Sanborn attended Marine Corps Command and Staff College and was later assigned in July 2001 as executive officer of the Marine Attack Squadron 542 (VMA-542). He deployed to Iraq during Operation Southern Watch and Operation Iraqi Freedom. In 2003, he was reassigned as Operations Officer of the MAG-14. In June 2004 as a lieutenant colonel, Sanborn assumed duties as commanding officer of Marine Attack Squadron 542 (VMA-542) while stationed in Iraq and served in that position until summer 2006. After this command assignment Sanborn received assignment as a student, Industrial College of Armed Forces at Fort McNair, now known as Dwight D. Eisenhower School for National Security and Resource Strategy, where he earned a Master of Science degree in National Resource Strategy. He next served a staff assignment with the Joint Strike Fighter program in Washington D.C. As a colonel, he assumed duties as commanding officer of Marine Aircraft Group 14 from May 2009 to July 2011. He was selected for promotion to brigadier general in 2010. Sanborn then served briefly as Assistant Wing Commander for 2nd MAW (Forward) deploying to Afghanistan as part of Operation Enduring Freedom. He was next assigned a staff position as the Deputy Director J-3, U.S. European Command in Stuttgart, Germany (July 2011 to July 2013). He served at Headquarters Marine Corps before assuming duties as Commanding General of 1st Marine Aircraft Wing. Following this command assignment, he served as assistant commander of the front wing of the 2nd Wing, which was stationed in Afghanistan. In July 2001, he was appointed Deputy Chief of Staff of the United States European Command in Stuttgart, Germany. In his next position, he served as Head of the Marine Corps' Personnel Division. In July 2015, he was appointed Commanding General, 1st Marine Air Wing. In July 2017, he was appointed Commander, United States Marine Forces Europe and Africa and served in that position till his retirement in July 2019.

During his service he accumulated over 2,400 flight hours on AV-8B Harrier II aircraft.

=== Awards and decorations ===
U.S. military decorations
Defense Superior Service Medal with oak leaf cluster
Legion of Merit
Bronze Star Medal
Purple Heart
Meritorious Service Medal with gold award star
Air Medal with Strike/Flight Award numeral 8 and Combat "V" Device
Navy Achievement Medal with gold award star
Presidential Unit Citation
Combat Action Ribbon
Navy Unit Commendation with bronze service star
Navy Meritorious Unit Commendation with three bronze service stars
Prisoner of War Medal
U.S. Service (Campaign) Medals and Service and Training Ribbons
National Defense Service Medal with bronze service star
Armed Forces Expeditionary Medal
Southwest Asia Service Medal with two bronze campaign stars
Afghanistan Campaign Medal with bronze service star
Iraq Campaign Medal with two bronze campaign stars
Global War on Terrorism Service Medal
Global War on Terrorism Expeditionary Medal
Armed Forces Service Medal
Humanitarian Service Medal with bronze campaign stars
Navy Sea Service Deployment Ribbon with four bronze service stars
Overseas Service Ribbon with bronze service star
NATO Medal for Yugoslavia with bronze service star
Kuwait Liberation Medal (Saudi Arabia)
Kuwait Liberation Medal (Kuwait)

U.S. badges, patches and tabs
Naval Aviator Insignia
Parachutist Badge
Rifle Expert Badge
Pistol Expert Badgec
