= 3rd Battalion, 14th Marines =

3rd Battalion, 14th Marine Regiment
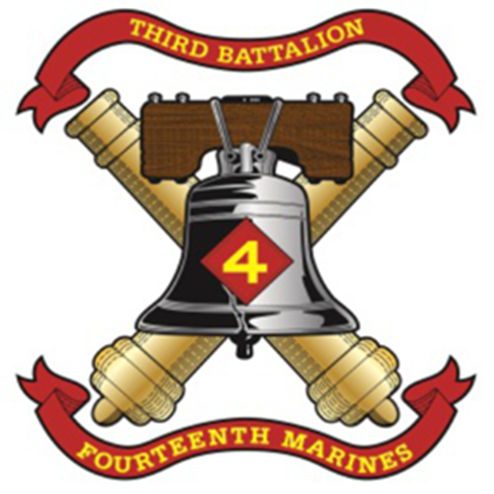
- 3rd Battalion, 14th Marine Regiment insignia
- Active: July 22, 1942 – present
- Country: United States of America
- Branch: United States Marine Corps
- Type: Artillery
- Role: Provide fire support for 4th Marine Division
- Part of: 14th Marine Regiment; 4th Marine Division
- Garrison/HQ: Bristol, Pennsylvania
- Engagements: World War II; Battle of Kwajalein; Battle of Saipan; Battle of Tinian; Battle of Iwo Jima; Operation Desert Shield/Operation Desert Storm; Iraq War

Commanders
- Current commander: LtCol Jacob P. Pagragan
- Notable commanders: Carl A. Youngdale; Paul W. Brier

3rd Battalion, 14th Marine Regiment (3/14) is a reserve artillery battalion comprising four firing batteries and a headquarters battery. The battalion is based in Bristol, Pennsylvania and its primary weapon system is the M777 howitzer with a maximum effective range of 30 km. They fall under the command of the 14th Marine Regiment and the 4th Marine Division.

== Current units ==
Name	Location
Headquarters Battery	Bristol, Pennsylvania
Battery G (Golf Battery)	Fort Dix, New Jersey
Battery H (Hotel Battery)	Richmond, Virginia
Battery I (India Battery)	Allentown, Pennsylvania
Battery M (Mike Battery)	Chattanooga, Tennessee

== History ==
=== Second World War ===
Third Battalion, 14th Marine Regiment, 4th Marine Division was activated on 22 July 1942 as 3d Battalion, 12th Marine Regiment, 3d Marine Division. It was re-designated 3d Battalion, 14th Marine Regiment, 4th Marine Division on 20 February 1943. This makes it the first battalion in the 14th Marine Regiment to be activated for service in the Pacific War. The battalion initially trained at Camp Lejeune, North Carolina. From September 1943 to January 1944, the entire 14th Marine Regiment conducted training at Camp Pendleton, Camp Dunlap, Aliso Canyon, and San Clemente in California. Lieutenant Colonel Robert E. MacFarlane was appointed commanding officer, and he would remain in that role for the duration of most combat operations during World War II

On 6 January 1944, 3d Battalion embarked ships for deployment in the Operation Flintlock, the U.S. campaign to take the Marshall Islands. On the morning of 31 January, elements of 1st Battalion, 25th Marines cleared the islet of Ennuebing, southwest of Roi-Namur in the Kwajalein Atoll. Then, 3d Battalion landed on Ennuebing with the mission of supporting the landing on Roi-Namur. During the landing, two 75mm howitzers were lost and four marines died after two LVTs (Landing Vehicles, Tracked) sank; 3d Battalion surgeon Lieutenant Irad B. Hardy Jr., USN, received the Navy and Marine Corps Medal for repeatedly swimming out to the floundering LVTs in order to assist marines and sailors. Third Battalion began firing on enemy Japanese positions on Roi (the western half of the Roi-Namur island) at 6:58 am on 1 February in support of 2d Battalion, 23d Marines. Roi was quickly taken by 23d Marines. The successful assault was largely due to supporting arms, including artillery from 3/14; after the battle it was estimated that supporting arms produced 60% of Japanese KIAs on Roi. Third Battalion embarked upon the USS La Salle, USS Sheridan, and USS Calvert, departing from the Kwajalein Atoll on 5 February and arriving at Maui, Territory of Hawaii on 16 February. While at Maui, 3d Battalion rested and refitted, received replacements, conducted training, and rearmed with M2A1 (M101A1) 105mm cannons.

On 12 May 1944, all of 14th Marines, including 3d Battalion, embarked on board USS Leonard Wood and stopped at Pearl Harbor before setting sail towards Saipan in the Northern Mariana Islands in order to participate in Operation Forager. On 15 June, infantry units of the 4th Marine Division began landing on the southwestern coast of Saipan. As the assault on the beaches stalled, 14th Marines was ordered at approximately 1:15 pm to land. Third Battalion loaded onto DUKWs and was the first artillery unit to arrive on the shore. By 2:45 pm, 3d Battalion had pushed 50 yards inland of Yellow Beach 2 and began firing in support of the 25th Marine Regiment. At approximately 3:30 am on 16 June, 3d Battalion was critical in stopping Japanese counterattack against Company C, 1st Battalion, 25th Marines. The 4th Marine Division then made a drive towards Mt. Tapochau and Magicienne (now Laolao) Bay; all 14th Marines artillery was directed to support these assaults. The island was declared secure and the battle over on 9 July.

Tinian, a little more than three miles south of Saipan, was the next objective for U.S. forces. During the beginning phases of battle, 3d Battalion was positioned on the southwestern corner of Saipan, where it provided supporting fires to the 4th Marine Division as it landed on the northwestern corner of Tinian on J-Day, 24 July 1944. On the afternoon of 26 July, 3d Battalion became the first artillery unit with guns larger than 75mm to land on Tinian; 3d Battalion was given a general support role for 4th Marine Division. The island was declared secure on 1 August, but on 4 August, Battery I of 3d Battalion repulsed a Japanese attack, marking the last combat action of the Mariana Islands campaign for 14th Marines. Third Battalion boarded SS Jean Lafitte from 5–14 August and arrived at Kahului on the island of Maui sometime between 24 and 31 August. For its actions during the Battles of Saipan and Tinian, 3d Battalion received a Presidential Unit Citation.

=== Gulf War: Operation Desert Shield and Operation Desert Storm ===
In November 1990, Battery H, commanded by Capt. Paul W. Brier, and Battery I were two of four reserve artillery batteries mobilized to augment active component formations during the Gulf War. They deployed to Camp Lejeune, North Carolina, in December, and subsequently deployed to Saudi Arabia in January 1991. Battery H was attached to 1st Battalion, 11th Marines, 1st Marine Division, and Battery I to 10th Marine, 2d Marine Division, becoming parts of Task Force Papa Bear and Task Force Ripper, respectively, for the ground assault on 24 February through two obstacle belts and subsequent operations to liberate Kuwait from Iraqi forces. These active component augmentations were necessary as both of these artillery regiments were lacking one of their organic direct support artillery batteries, as they each had a battery attached to embarked and deployed Marine Expeditionary Units.

On 25 February, Battery H engaged, with direct howitzer fire, and destroyed an Iraqi mobile rocket launching system at a range of 800m, which was subsequently found to be in the center of an Iraqi brigade of D20 152mm howitzers. Battery H had just occupied an exposed firing position, having received multiple shelling which significantly wounded one cannoneer, Sgt. Chris LaCivita. The 8-gun battery's 1000m by 700m position was on the far side of the second obstacle belt, well in front of the tank and infantry maneuver units it supported, with the burning Burqan oil field to its immediate east. This positioning far forward of the forward line of troops was selected to support the 1st Marine Division's northward momentum and Task Force Papa Bear's continued and rapid assault into Kuwait City.

The battery was laid on an azimuth of fire to the north, when it received a battalion mass fire mission on a target 30 km to its south. Unbeknownst to the battery's Marines, an Iraqi Brigade was launching a counterattack through the burning oil field on 1st Marine Division Command Post. On the battery's easternmost flank piece (Gun #1) Gunner Sgt Shawn Toney and Section Chief Sergeant Thomas Stark, IV, spotted two enemy multiple rocket launchers as they were shifting trails to fire to the south. They engaged and destroyed both launchers with heavy automatic weapons and direct fire from their M198 155mm howitzer, while the rest of the battery continued to support the fire mission to the south and defend the battery position from ground assault.

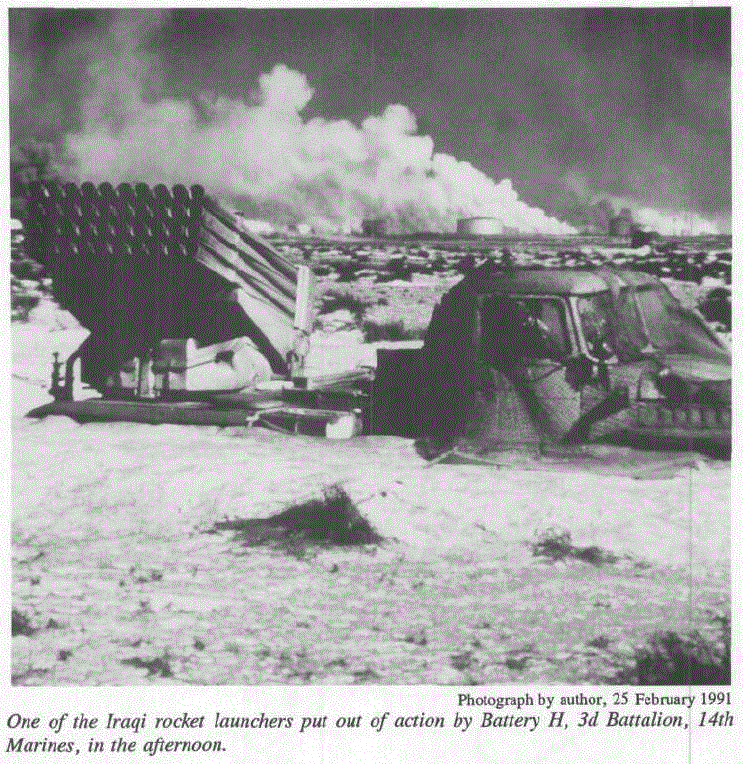
One of the Iraqi rocket launchers destroyed by Battery H, 3rd Battalion, 14th Marines, at the al Burqan Oil Field, Kuwait, 25 February 1991.

LtCol. Jay Sollis, the 1/11 Commander, arrived in the battery position, requested air support and directed a section of AH-1W Sea Cobra to engage the Iraqi counterattack force in the oil field.[7]

On the night of 25 February, the Battalion CP occupied a new position in support of Task Force Papa Bear. A security patrol, which included Lance Corporal Troy L. Gregory of Battery H, was organized to investigate an enemy bunker adjacent to the new CP position. While conducting this patrol, Gregory stepped on an Iraqi land mine and was critically wounded. Despite quick evacuation to a Naval Hospital, he died the following day of his wounds, just a few days before his 21st birthday. He was posthumously awarded the Purple Heart Medal and Combat Action Ribbon and was laid to rest at Arlington National Cemetery in section 60, Grave 7723. The Navy-Marine Corps Reserve Center in Richmond was renamed in his honor.

Battery H's final position was just south of the Kuwait International Airport when the ceasefire was announced. The Battery subsequently retrograded to the 1st Marine Division Support Area in Saudi Arabia. In April, the battery redeployed to the United States and was released from active duty.

== Iraq War ==
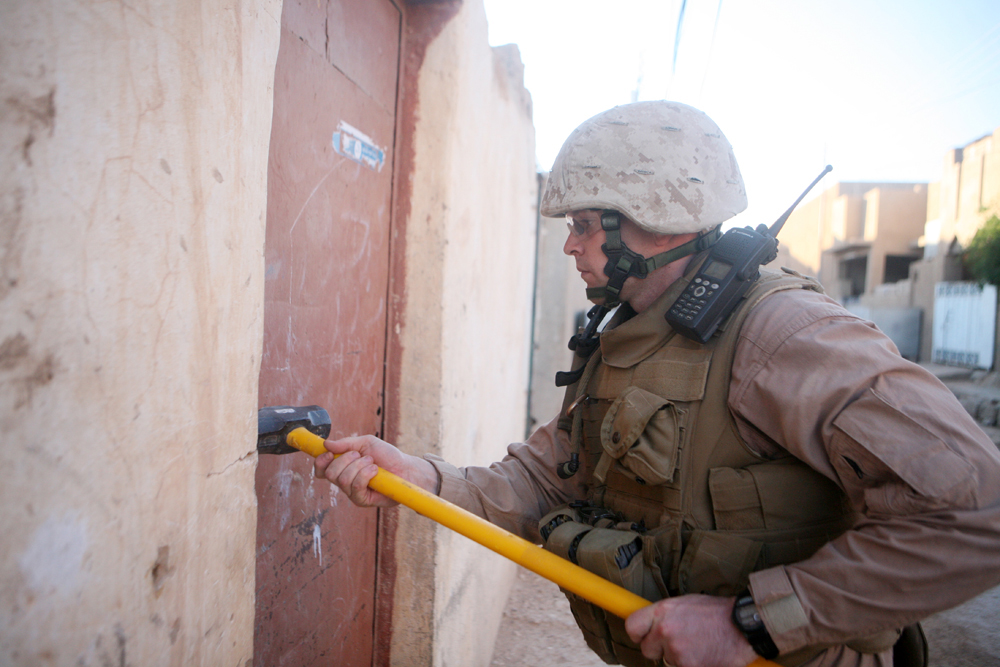
A Marine (SSgt Daniel Jones) with Battery M, 3/14 hammers a door during a cache search in Rutbah, Iraq.

In 2004, Mike Battery, out of Chattanooga, Tennessee deployed to Fallujah, Iraq and took part in Operation Phantom Fury to re-take the insurgent-held city.

They later deployed again in 2007 in support of Operation Iraqi Freedom. During this second deployment, they were attached to 2nd Light Armored Reconnaissance Battalion, Regimental Combat Team 5 and operated in the vicinity of Ar Rutbah under the callsign, ~~"Excalibur"~~ Palehorse. The same callsign that Mike Battery used when it was a part of 4th Battalion 14th Marines during the battle of Fallujah in 2004. In 2007, the unit suffered one casualty Cpl Dustin J. Lee.

== 2015 Chattanooga shootings ==
On July 16, 2015, four Marines with Mike Battery's Inspector-Instructor staff were killed by a gunman who was targeting military installations. In addition, a sailor died from his wounds two days later.

Some of the 3/14 Marines killed in action were reportedly killed while returning fire at the gunman, providing cover for a larger group of potential victims who were escaping over a fence. They were identified as:

Name	Age	Hometown	Branch	Rank
Carson A. Holmquist	25	Grantsburg, Wisconsin	Marine Corps	Sergeant
Thomas J. Sullivan	40	Springfield, Massachusetts	Marine Corps	Gunnery Sergeant
Squire K. "Skip" Wells	21	Marietta, Georgia	Marine Corps	Lance Corporal
David A. Wyatt	37	Russellville, Arkansas	Marine Corps	Staff Sergeant

In addition, Sergeant DeMonte Cheeley, was shot in the leg.

The Battery Commander during the shootings, Major Mike Abrams, declared during the memorial service that his Marines "were selfless in their efforts to take care of one another, and they acted with unquestionable courage."

MajGen Paul W. Brier, Commanding General of the 4th Marine Division, spoke at the nationally televised press conference held in Chattanooga on 22 July 2015. He praised the Marines and Sailors who risked their lives to help others and stop the gunman. “The legacy that day is one of valor.” "'I can tell you that our Marines reacted the way you would expect,' the major general said. 'Rapidly going from room to room, they got their fellow Marines to safety. Once they had gotten to safety, some willingly ran back into the fight.'"

== See also ==
- List of United States Marine Corps battalions
- Organization of the United States Marine Corps
