= Stephen M. Neary =

United States Marine Corps general

Stephen Neary
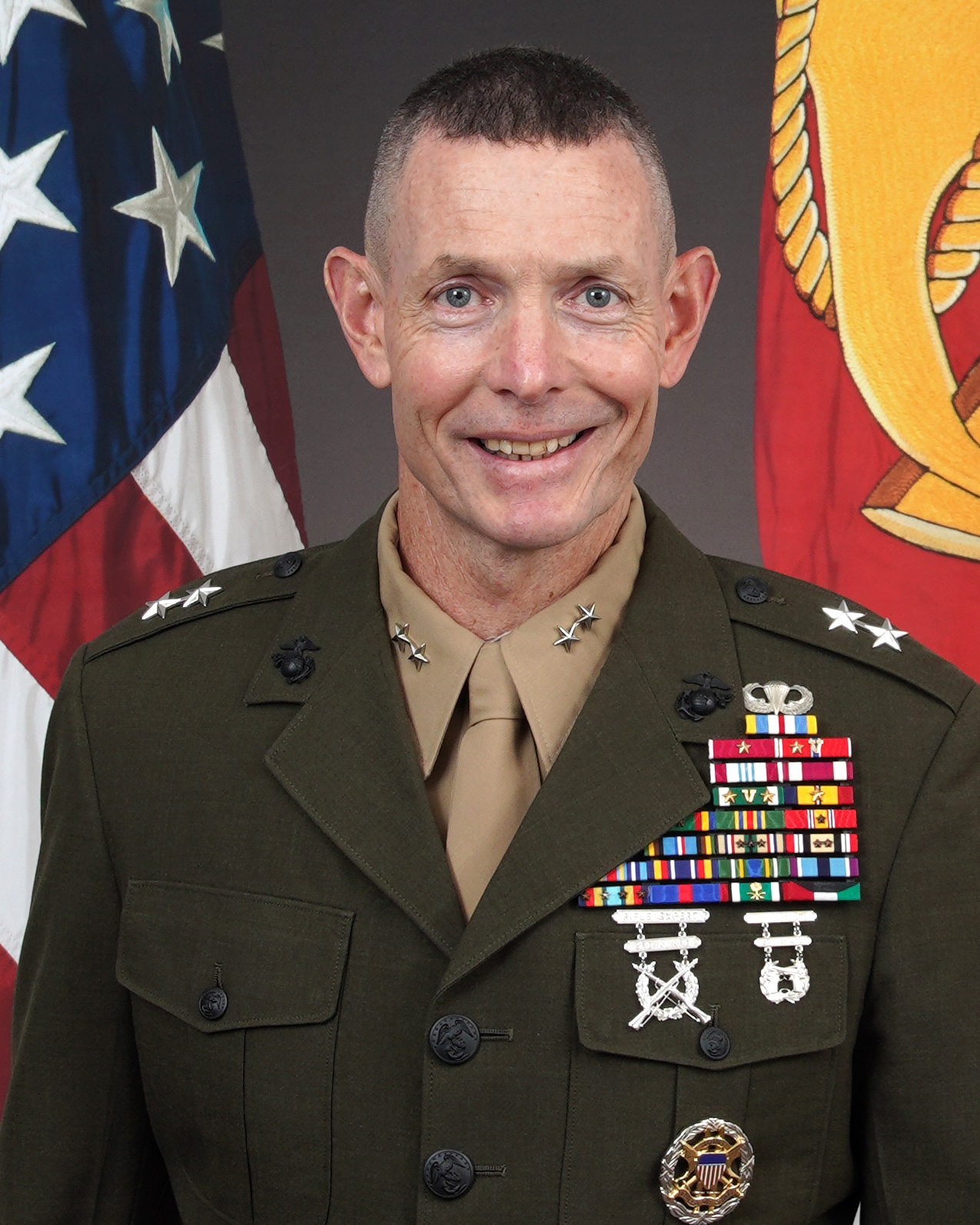
- Born: Boston, Massachusetts, U.S.
- Military career
- Allegiance: United States of America
- Branch: United States Marine Corps
- Service years: 1988–2021
- Rank: Major General
- Commands: United States Marine Forces Europe and Africa; 2nd Marine Expeditionary Brigade; 4th Marine Regiment
- Conflicts: Gulf War; Iraq War
- Awards: Defense Superior Service Medal; Legion of Merit; Bronze Star Medal; Meritorious Service Medal

Stephen M. Neary is a retired U.S. Marine major general who previously served as commanding general, United States Marine Forces Europe and Africa.

== Marine career ==
Neary was commissioned in the United States Marine Corps as a second lieutenant after graduation from Virginia Military Institute in 1988. He graduated from The Basic School and the Infantry Officers Course, then received assignment as rifle platoon commander and 81 mm mortar platoon commander with 1st Battalion, 1st Marines. He served during Operation Desert Shield/Desert Storm. His next assignment was as company commander and operations officer with 3rd Battalion, 3rd Marines. His staff assignments include tactics instructor, The Basic School; the Future Operations Officer of the 4th Marine Expeditionary Brigade (AT); Plans and Executive Officer for 8th Marine Regiment in support of Operation Secure Tomorrow in Haiti; Plans Observer Trainer with the Joint Warfighting Center J7 in Suffolk, Virginia; commanding officer, Marine Recruiting Station, New Jersey; and branch chief of the Programs Assessment Branch, Programs and Resources, Headquarters Marine Corps. As a lieutenant colonel, Neary assumed command of 3rd Battalion, 8th Marines in July 2004. He led the battalion in combat during Operation Iraqi Freedom in Fallujah and Ramadi. Following his promotion to Colonel, Neary assumed command of 4th Marine Regiment from June 2010 to July 2012.

As a general officer, Neary's assignments include deputy commanding general, Marine Corps Combat Development Command and assistant deputy commandant for combat development & integration from October 2015 to June 2016; deputy director for joint training with the Joint Staff from June 2016 to July 2018; deputy commanding general, II Marine Expeditionary Force and commanding general, 2nd Marine Expeditionary Brigade from July 8, 2018, to June 5, 2020. As a major general, Neary assumed command of U.S. Marine Corps Forces Europe & Africa in July 2020. General David H. Berger, the Commandant of the Marine Corps, relieved Stephen Neary of his command on October 20, 2020, citing a "loss of trust and confidence in his ability to serve in command". Neary was found to have used a racial slur when speaking to a group of young Marines.

== Awards and decorations ==
U.S. military decorations
Defense Superior Service Medal
Legion of Merit with gold award star
Bronze Star Medal with Combat Distinguishing Device and gold award star
Defense Meritorious Service Medal
Meritorious Service Medal
Navy and Marine Corps Commendation Medal with Combat Distinguishing Device and two gold award stars
Combat Action Ribbon with gold award star
U.S. Unit Awards
Navy Unit Commendation with bronze service star
Navy Meritorious Unit Commendation
U.S. Service (Campaign) Medals and Service and Training Ribbons
National Defense Service Medal with bronze service star
Armed Forces Expeditionary Medal
Southwest Asia Service Medal with three bronze campaign stars
Iraq Campaign Medal with two bronze campaign stars
Global War on Terrorism Expeditionary Medal
Global War on Terrorism Service Medal
Korea Defense Service Medal
Humanitarian Service Medal
Sea Service Deployment Ribbon with silver and three bronze service stars
Kuwait Liberation Medal (Saudi Arabia)
Kuwait Liberation Medal (Kuwait)

U.S. badges, patches and tabs
Army Parachutist Badge
Rifle Expert Badge
Pistol Expert Badge
