= 2nd Marine Expeditionary Brigade =

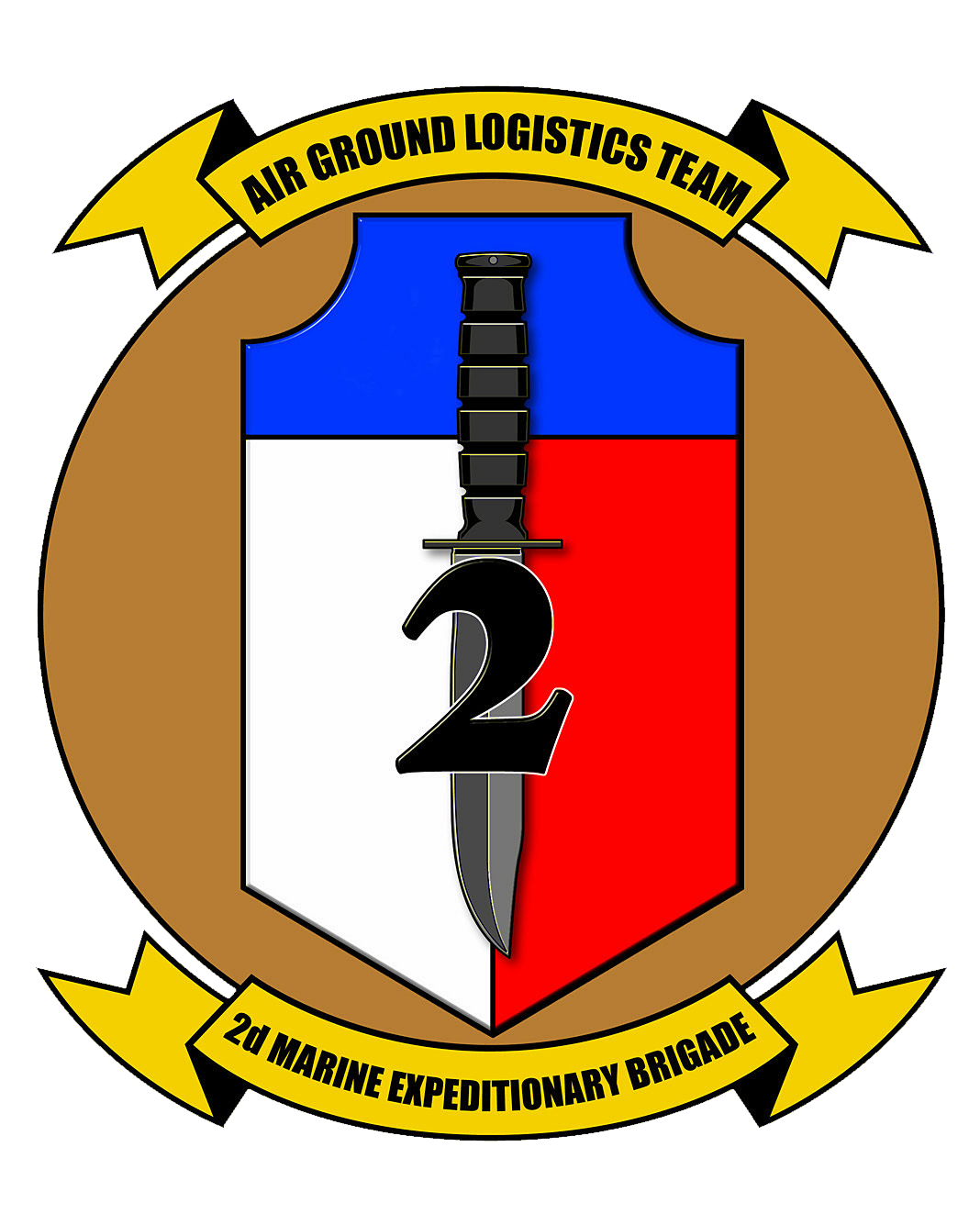
- 2nd MEB insignia
- Founded: 20 November 2012 (13 years, 6 months)
- Country: United States
- Branch: United States Marine Corps
- Type: Marine Air-Ground Task Force
- Part of: 2nd Marine Expeditionary Force
- Garrison/HQ: Marine Corps Base Camp Lejeune
- Engagements: Operation Iraqi Freedom: Battle of Nasiriyah; Operation Enduring Freedom: Operation Strike of the Sword; Battle of Marjah
- Website: 2ndmeb.marines.mil

Commanders
- Current commander: BGen Andrew T. Priddy
- Notable commanders: LtGen Richard F. Natonski; LtGen Lawrence D. Nicholson; MajGen Stephen M. Neary

The 2nd Marine Expeditionary Brigade is a brigade of the United States Marine Corps. It is part of II Marine Expeditionary Force (II MEF). It advertises itself as a "middleweight" crises response force of choice in the European and Southern Command Areas of Operation. It is able to "operate independently, as a service component, or to lead a Joint Task Force". Self-sufficient and interoperable, the 2nd Marine Expeditionary Brigade possesses a mix of command and control, combat power and specialized logistics. Operating as part of the greater Marine Corps team and with support from the United States Navy and other services, it can provide operational reach.

== Subordinate units ==
- Headquarters element: 5th Battalion 10th Marines
- Ground combat element: Regimental Combat Team 8
- Aviation combat element: Marine Aircraft Group 40
- Logistics combat element: Combat Logistics Regiment 2
- 2nd Civil Affairs Group

== History ==
In 1991 the 2nd MEB made the first test of the Norway Air-Landed Marine Expeditionary Brigade (NALMEB), comprised completely of Marine Corps Reserve units as Operation Desert Storm was getting under way. The exercise was designated Battle Griffin and took place in February–March 1991. The force comprised HQ Company 25th Marines, 3/25 Marines, Co E, 4th Reconnaissance Battalion, and 1/14 Marine Artillery (Batteries HQ, Alpha, and Bravo).

=== Iraq war ===
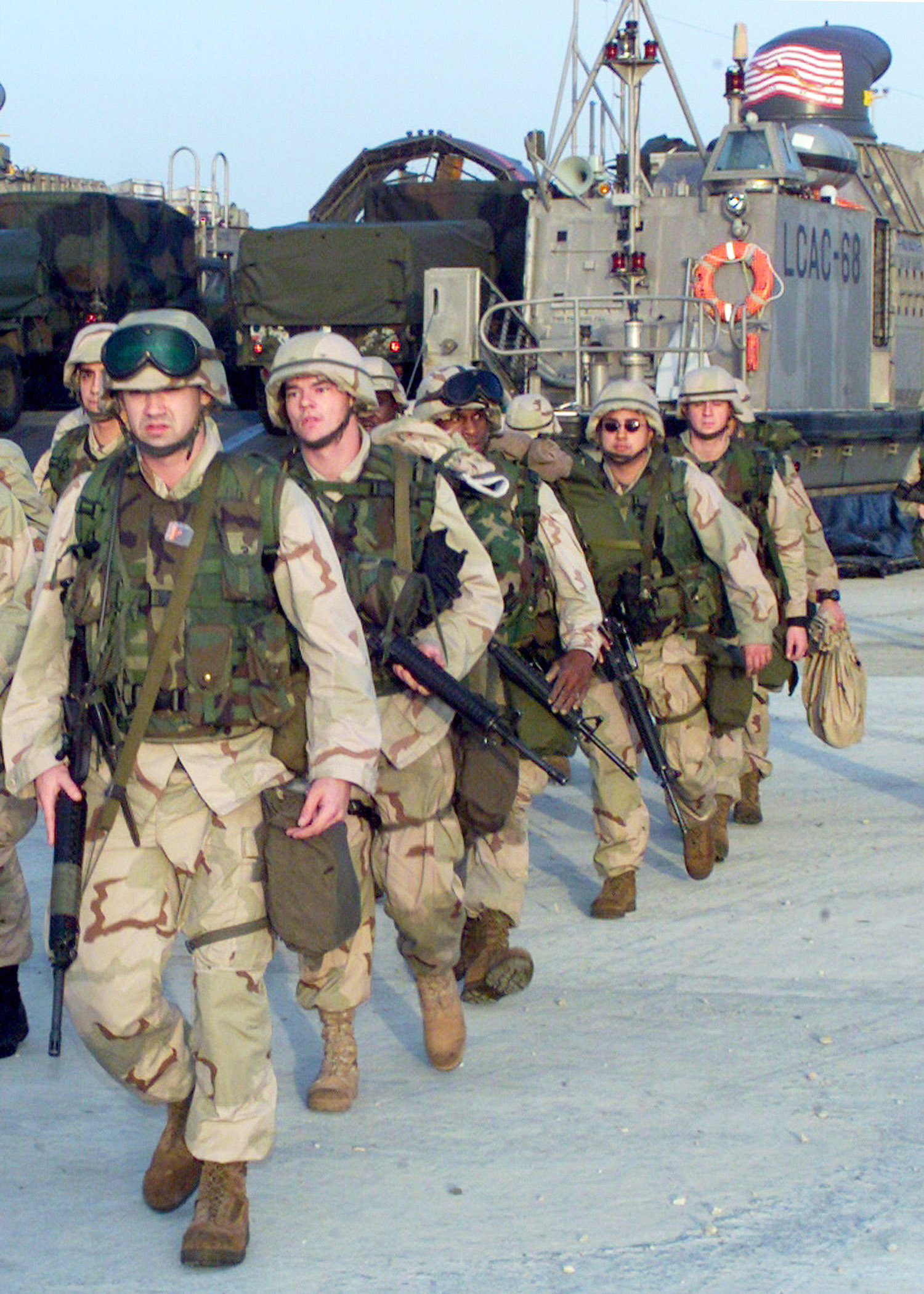
Marines from the 2nd Marine Expeditionary Brigade coming ashore in Kuwait. 15 February 2003

The 2nd MEB became Task Force Tarawa, commanded by Brigadier General Richard F. Natonski, for Operation Iraqi Freedom, and, as TF Tarawa, was thus part of the 2003 invasion of Iraq under I Marine Expeditionary Force. During the invasion 2nd MEB fought the Battle of Nasiriyah.

=== War in Afghanistan ===
NATO Symbol

2

It became Task Force Leatherneck, commanded by BGen Lawrence Nicholson during the 2009–10 deployment to Afghanistan for NATO's International Security Assistance Force (ISAF). In 2010, Task Force Leatherneck spearheaded both the Operation Strike of the Sword and the Battle of Marjah, the largest battles since the start of the Afghanistan Campaign.

The 2nd MEB Command Element was reactivated on 20 Nov 2012 at Camp Lejune, North Carolina. The reactivated unit is designed to be a "scalable, standing, joint-capable, and a deployment-ready headquarters element that can also enable the introduction of follow-on forces if required."

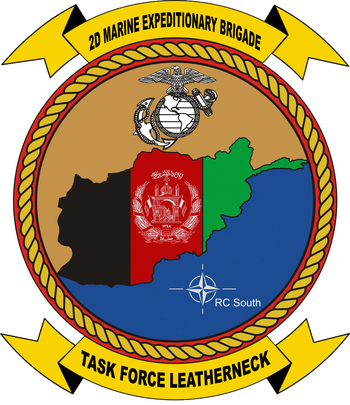
TF Leatherneck logo

== See also ==
- Marine Expeditionary Unit
