= John M. Paxton Jr. =

United States Marine Corps general

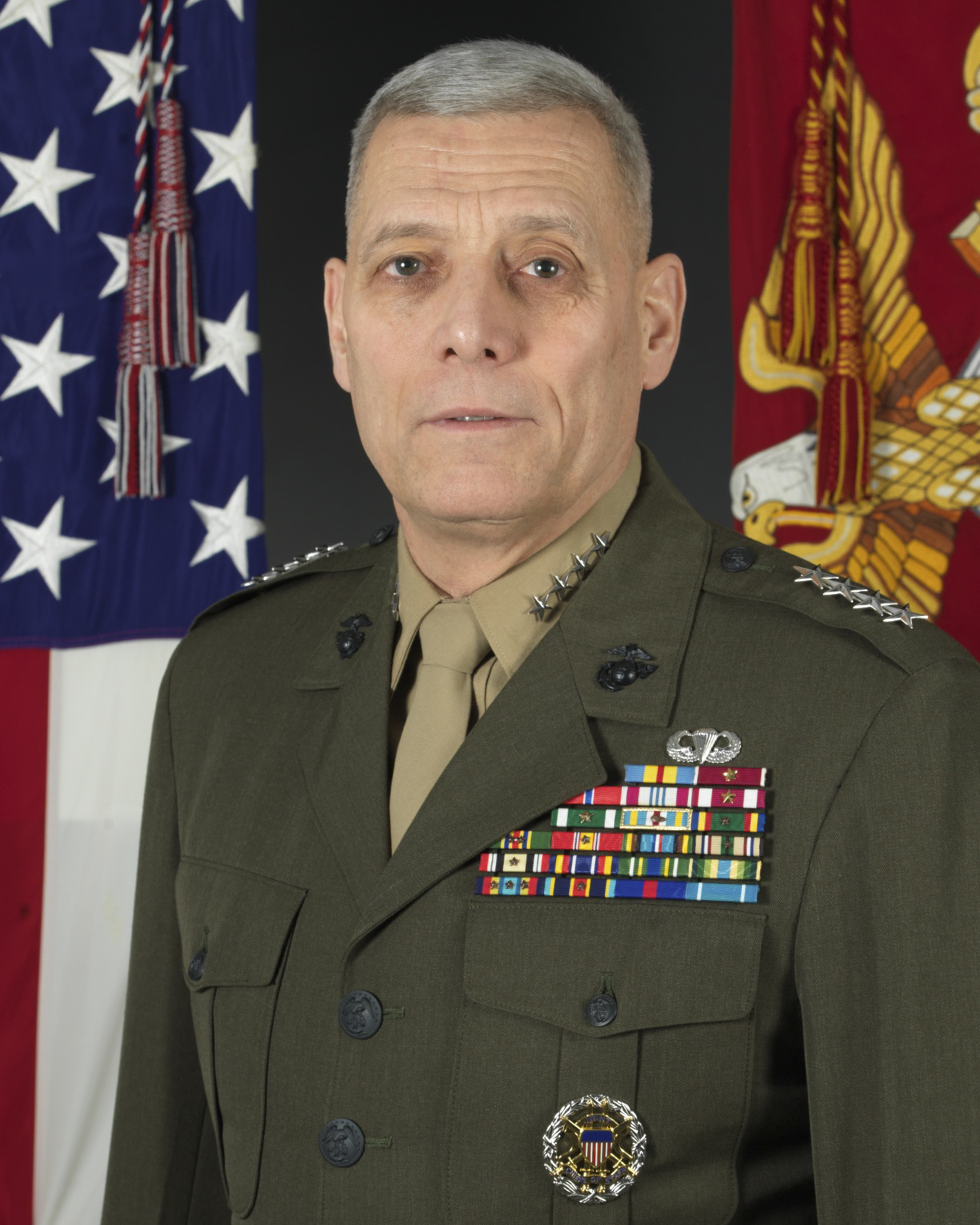
- Official portrait, 2013
- Born: 25 June 1951 (age 75); Chester, Pennsylvania, U.S.
- Alma mater: Cornell University
- Military career
- Allegiance: United States
- Branch: United States Marine Corps
- Service years: 1974–2016
- Rank: General
- Commands: Assistant Commandant of the Marine Corps; II Marine Expeditionary Force; 1st Marine Division
- Conflicts: Iraq War
- Awards: Defense Distinguished Service Medal; Navy Distinguished Service Medal; Legion of Merit (2); Bronze Star Medal; Defense Meritorious Service Medal; Meritorious Service Medal (2); Navy and Marine Corps Commendation Medal (2)

John M. Paxton Jr. (born 25 June 1951) is a retired United States Marine Corps four-star general who served as the 33rd Assistant Commandant of the Marine Corps. He previously served as the Commanding General of United States Marine Corps Forces Command; Commanding General, Fleet Marine Force Atlantic; Commander, United States Marine Corps Forces, Europe, as well as II Marine Expeditionary Force. Paxton retired on 4 August 2016, after 42 years of service.

Previously, Paxton was Director, J3 - Operations, The Joint Staff and Chief of Staff, Multinational Forces-Iraq. U.S. Defense Secretary Robert M. Gates announced on 13 March 2008, Paxton's nomination for appointment to the rank of lieutenant general, and for assignment as Director, Strategic Plans & Policy, J-5, The Joint Staff. On 22 May 2007, Paxton relinquished command of the 1st Marine Division to take the role of Chief of Staff for Multi-National Force-Iraq.

== Early life and education ==
Born in Chester, Pennsylvania on 25 June 1951, Paxton attended Cornell University in Ithaca, New York, earning both a bachelor's degree and a master's degree in Civil Engineering. He was elected to the Sphinx Head Society during his senior year. Moreover, he was a member of Delta Upsilon fraternity throughout his undergraduate years at Cornell. Upon completion of Officer Candidates School, he was commissioned a second lieutenant in the United States Marine Corps in 1974.

In addition to The Basic School, Paxton's professional education includes United States Marine Corps Amphibious Warfare School (non-resident), United States Army Infantry Officer Advanced Course, and the United States Marine Corps Command and Staff College. From 1994 to 1995 Paxton was a Federal Executive Fellow in Foreign Policy Studies at the Brookings Institution. He has also been a Marine Corps Fellow at Massachusetts Institute of Technology's Seminar XXI.

== Military career ==
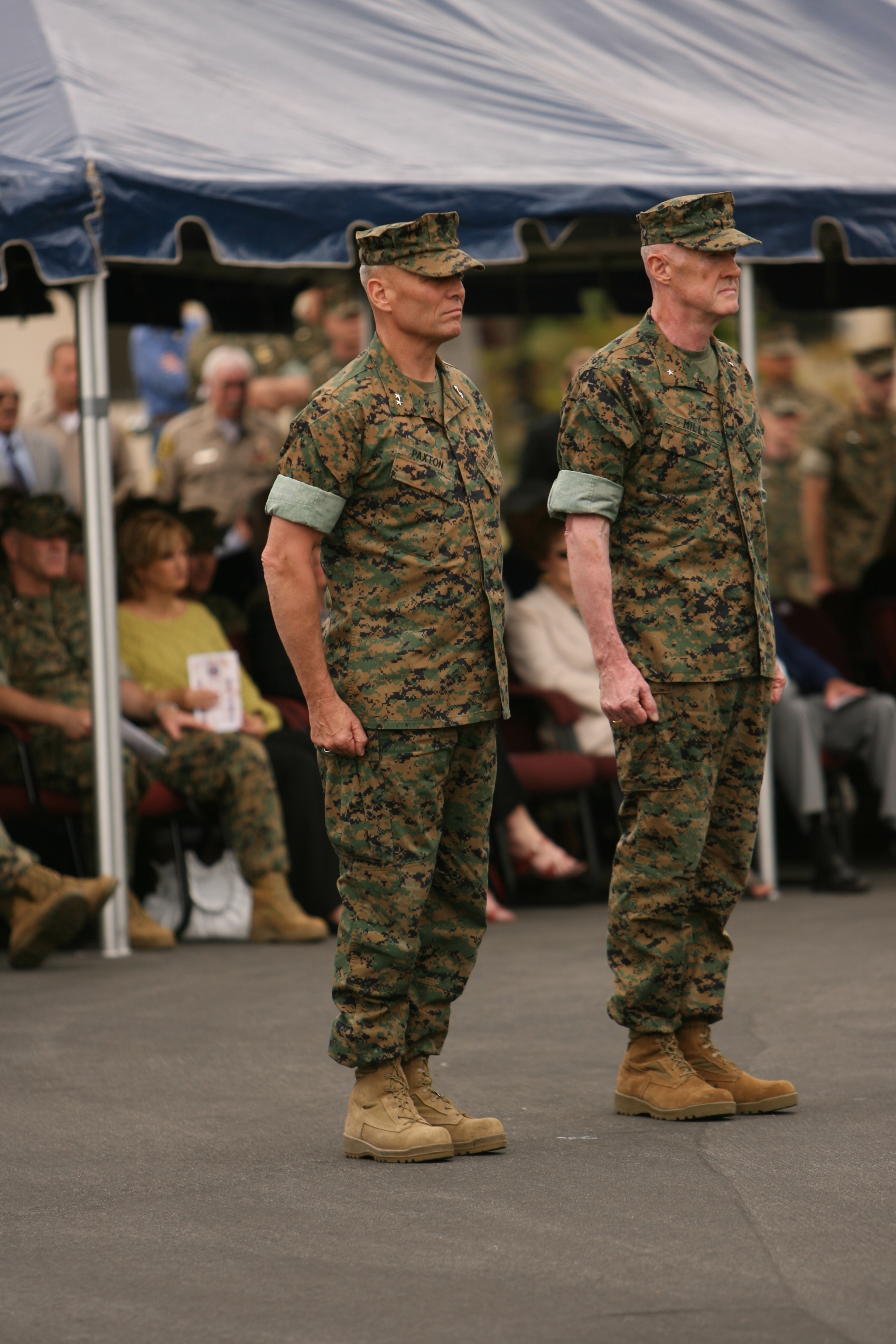
Paxton (left) turns over command of the 1st Marine Division on 22 May 2007

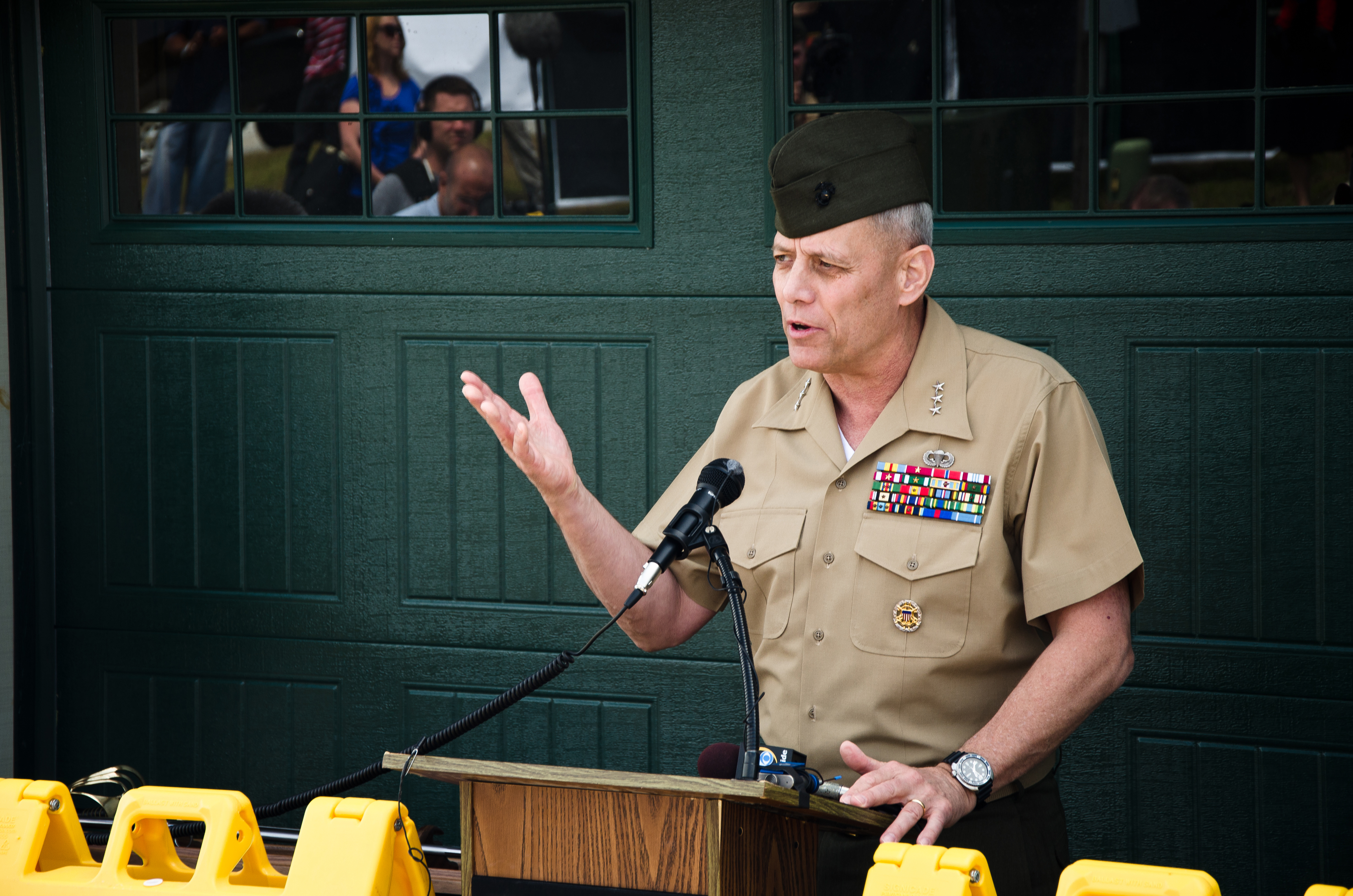
Paxton speaking in April 2012

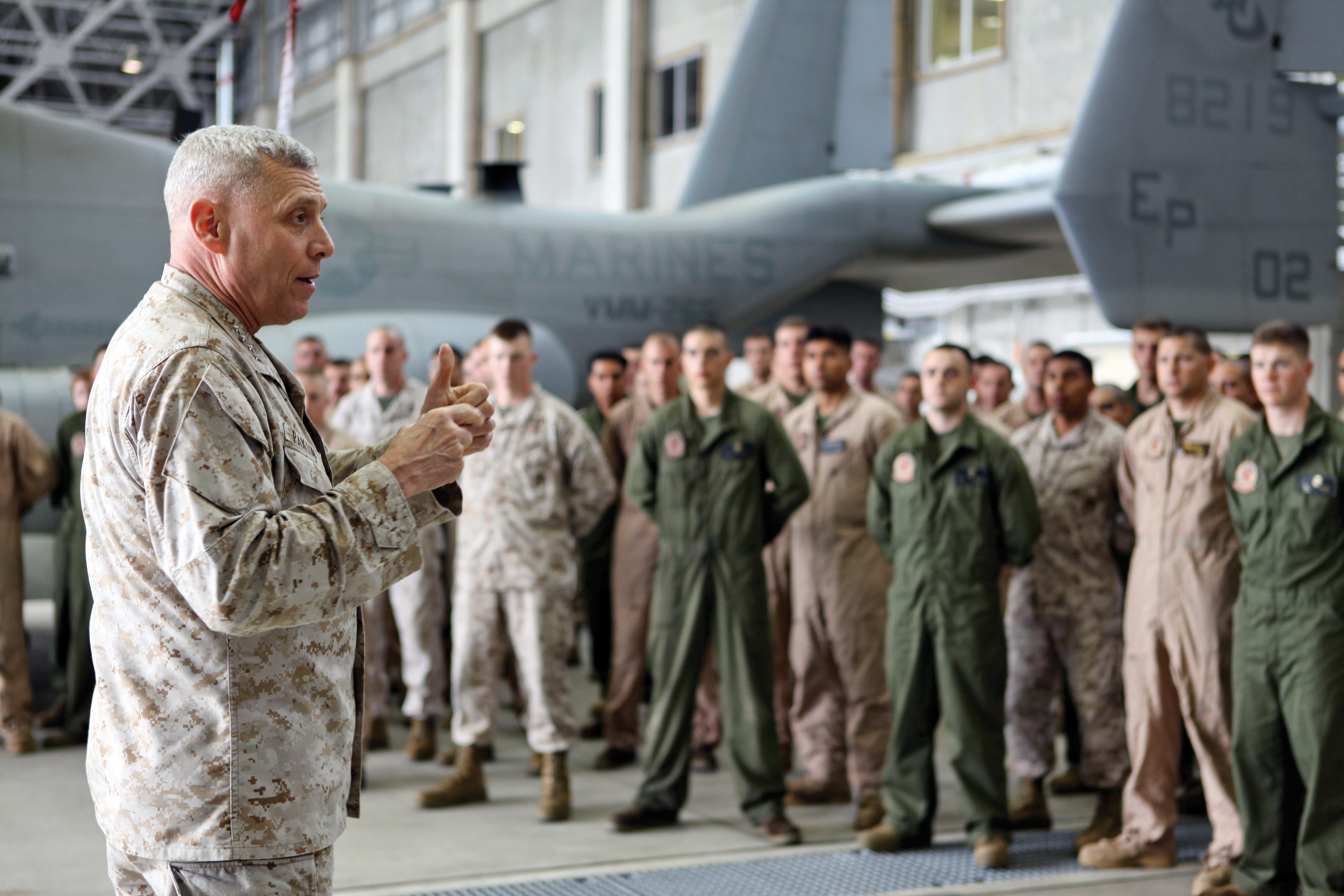
Paxton speaking in March 2013.

Upon completion of The Basic School, Paxton was ordered to Airborne School at Fort Benning, Georgia and then assigned as a Rifle Platoon Commander in Bravo Company, 1st Battalion, 3rd Marines, 1st Marine Brigade, Kaneohe, Hawaii.

Paxton served twice with the 1st Marine Division (3rd Battalion, 5th Marines and 1st Marines), once with the 2nd Marine Division (1st Battalion, 8th Marines), and twice with the 3rd Marine Division (1st Battalion, 3rd Marines and 2nd Battalion, 4th Marines), commanding at the platoon, company, battalion and regimental levels. He commanded Battalion Landing Team 1/8 from April 1992 to June 1994. They deployed with 22nd Marine Expeditionary Unit Special Operations Capable and USS America (CV-66) Battle Group as Landing Force 6th Fleet (LF6F 2-93) and Joint Adaptive Task Force 93-2 in support of operations in Bosnia-Herzegovina, and later as United Nations Quick Reaction Force (QRF) in Mogadishu, Somalia.

In addition to command, Paxton also served in Operations, Plans and Training (G3/S3) at the battalion, regiment, division (1st and 2nd Marine Divisions) and Marine Expeditionary Force (II-MEF) levels. Non-Fleet Marine Force tours included Commanding Officer Company B, Marine Barracks, 8th & I, Washington, D.C. (1980–81); Commanding Officer Marine Corps Recruiting Station New York, New York (1985–88); Strategic Plans Branch (PLS), Plans, Policies and Operations (PP&O) Department, Headquarters United States Marine Corps; and as Executive Assistant and Marine Corps Aide to the Under Secretary of the Navy (1996–97). Paxton is a Joint Service Officer, having served at United Nations Command/Combined Forces Command in South Korea from 1989 to 1991 as Amphibious Operations Officer and Executive Officer, Crisis Action Team.

From June 1997 to June 1998, Paxton was the Assistant Chief of Staff G3 (Operations, Plans and Training). His next assignment, from June 1998 to June 2000, was commanding officer of 1st Marine Regiment. From 2000 to 2001, Paxton had a one-year tour as the United States Marine Corps Fellow (National Security Studies) at the Council on Foreign Relations in New York. From July 2001 to August 2003, he was the Director, Programs Division (RP), and Assistant Deputy Commandant of the Marine Corps for Programs and Resources (ADC,P&R), Headquarters Marine Corps.

From 2003 to 2006, Paxton served as Commanding General, Marine Corps Recruit Depot San Diego and Western Recruiting Region. On 22 May 2007, Paxton relinquished command of the 1st Marine Division to Brigadier General Richard P. Mills. Paxton next served as the Chief of Staff to the commander of Multi-National Force - Iraq. Advanced to lieutenant general in 2008, Paxton served initially as Director, Strategic Plans and Policy (J-5) on the Joint Staff, then was nominated and confirmed to the Operations Directorate (J-3), where he served until appointment as CG, II MEF; and CG, Marine Forces, Africa. Before departing the Pentagon, Paxton also served as interim director, The Joint Staff.

Paxton retired in August 2016. Paxton is an Advisory Board Member of Spirit of America, a 501(c)(3) organization that supports the safety and success of US troops serving abroad.

== Awards and decorations ==

Badge	Basic Parachutist Insignia			
1st row	Defense Distinguished Service Medal			
2nd row	Navy Distinguished Service Medal	Legion of Merit with one gold award star	Bronze Star	Defense Meritorious Service Medal
3rd row	Meritorious Service Medal w/ 1 award star	Navy and Marine Corps Commendation Medal w/ 1 award star	Joint Meritorious Unit Award with one bronze oak leaf cluster	Navy Unit Commendation with one bronze service star
4th row	Navy Meritorious Unit Commendation w/ 2 service stars	National Defense Service Medal w/ 1 service star	Armed Forces Expeditionary Medal	Southwest Asia Service Medal w/ 1 service star
5th row	Iraq Campaign Medal w/ 1 service star	Global War on Terrorism Service Medal	Korea Defense Service Medal	Armed Forces Service Medal
6th row	Navy Sea Service Deployment Ribbon w/ 3 service stars	Navy & Marine Corps Overseas Service Ribbon w/ 1 service star	Marine Corps Recruiting Ribbon	United Nations Medal
Badge	Office of the Joint Chiefs of Staff Identification Badge			

Paxton also holds several awards of the expert rifle badge and the sharpshooter pistol marksmanship badge.

Military offices
Preceded by Carter F. Ham	Director for Strategic Plans and Policy of the Joint Staff; 2008	Succeeded by James A. Winnefeld Jr.
Preceded by Carter F. Ham	Director for Operations of the Joint Staff; 2008–2011	Succeeded by Robert Neller
Preceded by John A. Toolan; Acting	Commander of the United States Marine Forces Africa; 2011–2012	Succeeded by Raymond C. Fox
Preceded by John A. Toolan; Acting	Commanding General of the II Marine Expeditionary Force; 2011–2012	Succeeded by Raymond C. Fox
Preceded by Dennis J. Hejlik	Commander of the United States Marine Corps Forces Command; 2012	Succeeded by W. Blake Crowe; Acting
Preceded by Dennis J. Hejlik	Commander of the United States Marine Forces Europe; 2012	Succeeded by W. Blake Crowe; Acting
Preceded by Joseph Dunford	Assistant Commandant of the Marine Corps; 2012–2016	Succeeded by Glenn M. Walters
