= 2nd Civil Affairs Group =

2d Civil Affairs Group
- Country: United States
- Branch: USMCR
- Type: Civil Affairs
- Role: Plan & conduct civil-military operations in concert with combat operations to reach the commander’s objectives.
- Size: Approximately 175
- Part of: Marine Forces Reserve
- Garrison/HQ: Joint Base Anacostia-Bolling; Washington, DC
- Engagements: Operation Enduring Freedom

Commanders
- Current commander: Col David Ready

2nd Civil Affairs Group (2nd CAG) is a civil affairs (CA) unit of the United States Marine Corps. It is based at Naval Support Facility Anacostia, Washington, D.C., and is part of the Force Headquarters Group of the Marine Forces Reserve. 2nd CAG mostly supports II MEF. The unit was deactivated in June 2019 and turned into Marine Corps Advisor Company (MCAC) Alpha and Marine Corps Advisor Company Bravo.

== Organization ==
2nd CAG is commanded by a Colonel and the unit has 38 Marine officers, 85 Marine enlisted, four Navy officers and one Navy enlisted. The unit consists of one headquarters detachment and four line detachments. The headquarters detachment also contains a standing G9 staff section of 24 Marines ready for rapid mobilization to support a brigade or larger unit.

== History ==
On 1 October 2013, 2nd CAG stood up from 4th Civil Affairs Group. In June 2019, the unit was deactivated and integrated again into the 4th Civil Affairs Group.

== Notable members ==
- Charles Lollar, running for Governor of Maryland
- Colonel Lawrence Kaifesh ran for U.S. Congress in the IL-8 District.
