= Tracy L. Garrett =

United States Marine Corps general

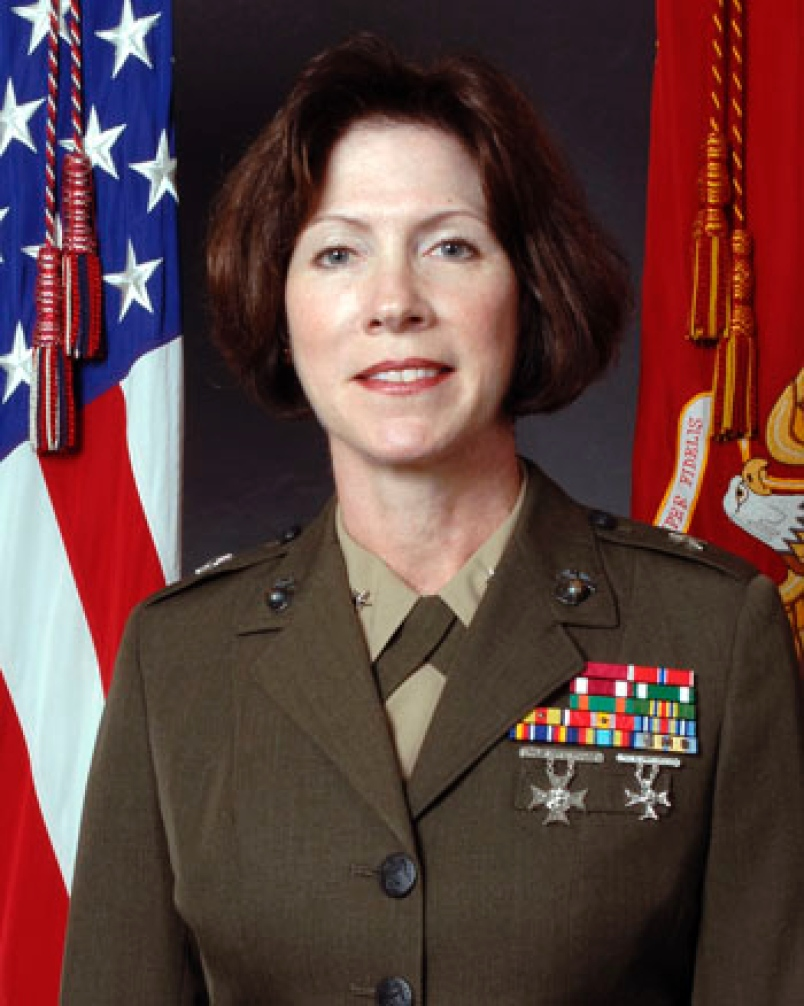
- Born: Seattle, Washington, U.S.
- Education: University of Washington; Naval War College
- Military career
- Allegiance: United States
- Branch: United States Marine Corps Reserve
- Service years: 1978–2014
- Rank: Major General
- Commands: Inspector General of the Marine Corps; United States Marine Corps Forces, Europe
- Conflicts: Iraq War
- Awards: Legion of Merit; Bronze Star Medal

Tracy L. Garrett is a retired major general of the United States Marine Corps Reserve. During her military career, she served as the first female Inspector General of the Marine Corps.

== Education ==
Garrett is a graduate of the University of Washington where she was a member of Kappa Delta sorority (Sigma Iota chapter) and the Naval War College.

== Military career ==
Tracy L. Garrett entered the Naval Reserve Officers Training Corps, and in 1978 graduated from the University of Washington with a degree in English. During this time, she studied abroad in Austria. Following graduation, she was commissioned as a second lieutenant in the United States Marine Corps. Her father had been in the Marine Corps, and she had made the decision to pursue a career there while in high school. She had specifically intended to join the reserves so that she could also raise a family.

In 1998, Garrett graduated with a master's degree in national security and strategic studies at the Naval War College in Rhode Island.

Garrett held a variety of commands, and served in the Iraq War between September 2004 and March 2005 as chief of staff of the 1st Force Service Support Group. In 2007, she was promoted to brigadier general, and again in 2010 to major general. She has served as commander of the United States Marine Corps Forces, Europe and Africa, and was the first female Inspector General of the Marine Corps.

Since 2010, Garrett has been a director of the USAA. Following 36 years of service, she retired from the Marine Corps on May 8, 2014; her posting immediately prior to retirement was as special adviser to the Commander of the United States Africa Command located in Stuttgart, Germany. She would commute on a monthly basis from her home in Seattle.

== Later life ==
Following retirement, Garrett continues to work with the USAA, and with the Girl Scouts of the USA in western Washington state, having been in the Girl Scouts as a child.

== Awards ==
Garrett's awards include the Legion of Merit, Bronze Star Medal, Meritorious Service Medal, Navy and Marine Corps Commendation Medal, and Navy and Marine Corps Achievement Medal.
