= Fleet Marine Force, Atlantic =

One of two maritime landing forces of the U.S. Marine Corps

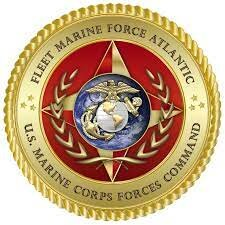
- The official seal of the Fleet Marine Force, Atlantic
- Active: 16 December 1946 – present
- Country: United States of America
- Type: Maritime general and special purpose landing force
- Role: Amphibious warfare, expeditionary warfare
- Part of: United States Marine Corps; United States Navy
- Garrison/HQ: NAVSTA Norfolk, Virginia, U.S.
- Website: marforcom.marines.mil

Commanders
- Current commander: LtGen Roberta L. Shea

The Fleet Marine Force, Atlantic (FMFLANT) is an American maritime landing force that is spread across the Atlantic Ocean. It is headquartered at Naval Station Norfolk and directs and commands all the subordinate elements of the Navy Expeditionary Strike Force and Marine Air-Ground Task Force components that follow under the 2nd, 4th, and 6th Fleet and the Marine Forces Command (MarForCom). The Commanding General of Marine Forces Command is dual-posted as the Commanding General of the Fleet Marine Force, Atlantic. FMFLANT is under operational control of the Commander-in-Chief, United States Fleet Forces Command, when deployed.

== History ==
The Fleet Marine Force, Atlantic, traces its history to the Advanced Base Force, created in the early 1900s. In the early 1920s, the Marine Corps began developing the advanced base doctrine from a defensive posture to one that included offensive amphibious operations. The units of the Advanced Base Force became the East Coast Expeditionary Force in 1921, during the reforms made to the Marine Corps structure by Commandant John Lejeune, to emphasize the more offensive nature of its potential operations. As the expeditionary warfare concept developed, in December 1933 the Fleet Marine Force was established, with one brigade at Quantico, Virginia, and one in San Diego, California. In 1941, the Fleet Marine Force became a training command and two field commands, the Amphibious Corps, Atlantic Fleet, and Amphibious Corps, Pacific Fleet, were created.

The Basic Post-War Plan No. 2 was issued on 22 March 1946, which divided the Marine Corps into two Fleet Marine Force components: Atlantic (FMFLANT) and Pacific (FMFPAC). The Fleet Marine Force, Atlantic, was activated with the commander of the 2nd Marine Division as its acting commanding general, and under the operational control of the Commander-in-Chief of the U.S. Atlantic Fleet, on 16 December 1946. Its first headquarters was Camp Lejeune in North Carolina, before being moved to Norfolk, Virginia, in March 1947. On 13 July 1992, FMFLANT became part of Marine Corps Forces, Atlantic (MARFORLANT), which was renamed U.S. Marine Corps Forces Command (MARFORCOM) on 30 December 2005.

From 1980, the commanding general of Fleet Marine Force, Atlantic, was also the designated head of Fleet Marine Force, Europe, which became Marine Corps Forces Europe (MARFOREUR) in 1994. In the early 1990s, the post also became the designated commander of Marine Corps Forces South (MARFORSOUTH). These were both "designate" headquarters, meaning they only had a minimal staff during peacetime that would become a larger full service component command only during operations. Commanding General, Fleet Marine Force, Atlantic, was nominally the commander of both. In 2008, MARFOREUR became a separate organization with its own dedicated commander, and MARFORSOUTH did so in 2015. From 1980 to 1997, the commanding general of FMFLANT also was the commanding general of II Marine Expeditionary Force.

== Organization ==
Reporting directly to the Commanding General, Fleet Marine Force, Atlantic (CG FMFLANT) are the Commanding General, II Marine Expeditionary Force (MEF), the Commanding General, 2nd Marine Expeditionary Brigade (MEB), and the Commanding Officers of three Marine Expeditionary Units (22d, 24th, 26th MEUs). The Commanding General, II MEF, exercises operational control over the 2d Marine Division, the 2d Marine Aircraft Wing, and the 2d Marine Logistics Group.

== Hierarchy of Fleet Marine Force units ==
=== Commander, United States Fleet Forces Command (COMFLTFORCOM) ===
Naval Support Activity
Norfolk, Virginia

==== Marine Forces Command (MARFORCOM) ====
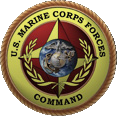

Landing Force, Second Fleet (LF2F)
Combined Task Force 22 (CTF-22)	Naval Station Norfolk; Norfolk, VA
Combined Task Force 23 (CTF-23)	Naval Station Norfolk; Norfolk, VA
II Marine Expeditionary Force (II MEF)	MCB Camp Lejeune; North Carolina, United States

==== Marine Forces, South (MARFORSOUTH) ====
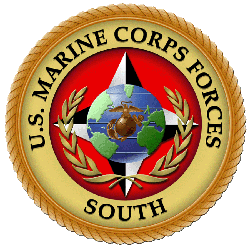

Landing Force, Fourth Fleet (LF4F)
	U.S. Southern Command; Miami, Florida
II Marine Expeditionary Force	MCB Camp Lejeune; North Carolina, United States

==== Marine Forces, Europe (MARFOREUR) ====
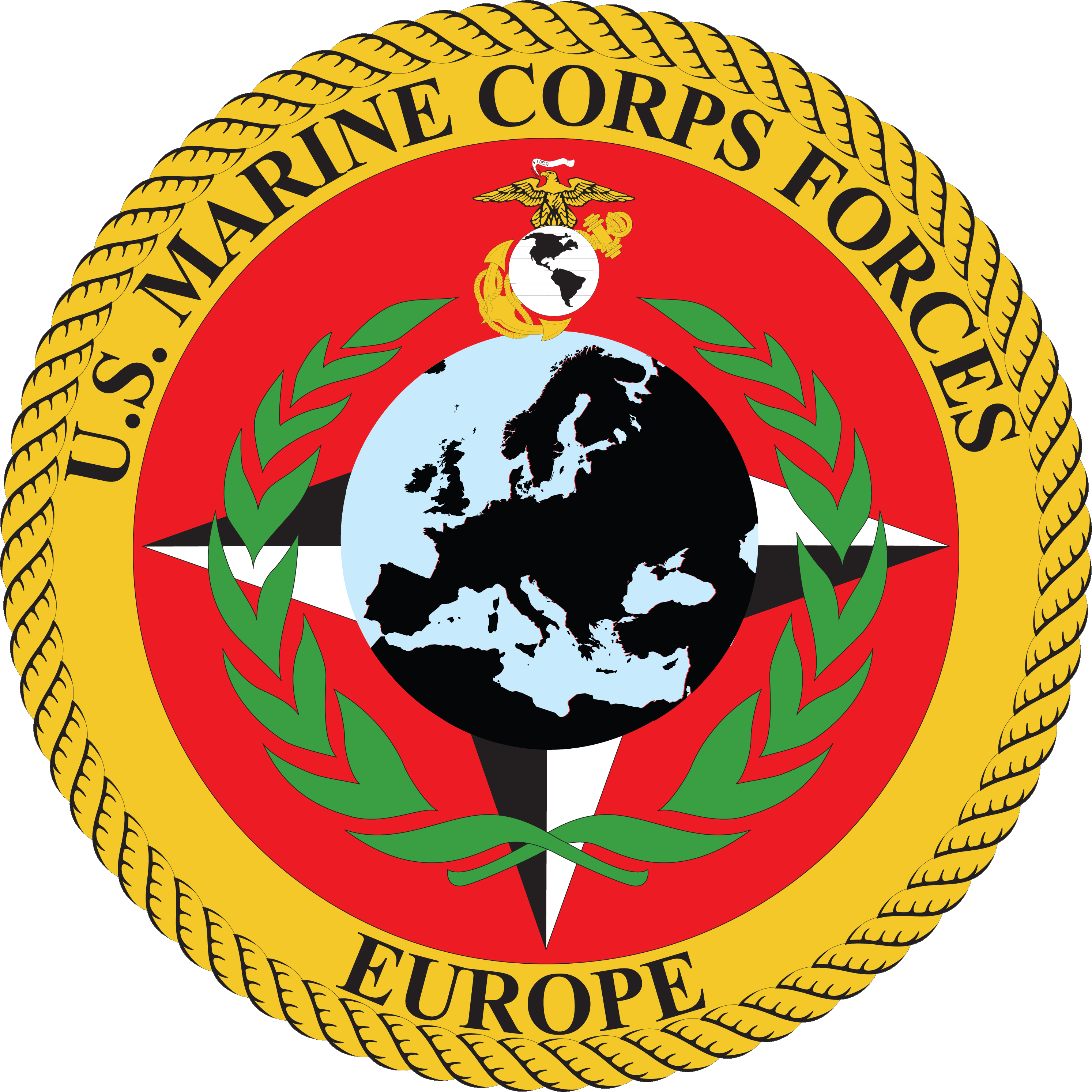

Landing Force, Sixth Fleet (LF6F)
Task Force 61	Naval Support Activity Naples; Naples, Italy
Task Force 62	Naval Support Activity Naples; Naples, Italy
Task Force 68	Naval Support Activity Naples; Naples, Italy
II Marine Expeditionary Force	MCB Camp Lejeune; North Carolina, United States

== List of commanders ==
No.	Commander		Term			Ref
No.	Portrait	Name	Took office	Left office	Term length	Ref
Commanding General FMFLANT
-	Thomas E. Watson	Major General; Thomas E. Watson (1892–1966); Acting	16 December 1946	1 January 1947	16 days	
1	Keller Rockey	Lieutenant General; Keller Rockey (1888–1970)	1 January 1947	1 July 1949	2 years, 181 days	
2	LeRoy P. Hunt	Lieutenant General; LeRoy P. Hunt (1892–1968)	1 July 1949	1 July 1951	2 years, 0 days	
3	Graves B. Erskine	Lieutenant General; Graves B. Erskine (1897–1973)	1 July 1951	1 July 1953	2 years, 0 days	
4	Oliver P. Smith	Lieutenant General; Oliver P. Smith (1893–1977)	1 July 1953	1 September 1955	2 years, 62 days	
5	Alfred H. Noble	Lieutenant General; Alfred H. Noble (1894–1983)	1 September 1955	1 November 1956	1 year, 61 days	
5	Ray A. Robinson	Lieutenant General; Ray A. Robinson (1896–1976)	1 November 1956	1 November 1957	1 year, 0 days	
6	Edwin A. Pollock	Lieutenant General; Edwin A. Pollock (1899–1982)	1 November 1957	1 November 1959	2 years, 0 days	
7	Joseph C. Burger	Lieutenant General; Joseph C. Burger (1902–1982)	1 November 1959	1 November 1961	2 years, 0 days	
8	Robert B. Luckey	Lieutenant General; Robert B. Luckey (1905–1974)	1 November 1961	1 August 1963	1 year, 273 days	
9	James P. Berkeley	Lieutenant General; James P. Berkeley (1907–1995)	1 August 1963	1 July 1965	1 year, 334 days	
10	Alpha Bowser	Lieutenant General; Alpha Bowser (1910–2003)	1 July 1965	1 July 1967	2 years, 0 days	
11	Richard G. Weede	Lieutenant General; Richard G. Weede (1911–1985)	1 July 1967	31 August 1969	2 years, 61 days	
12	Frederick E. Leek	Lieutenant General; Frederick E. Leek (1914–1996)	31 August 1969	1 July 1971	1 year, 304 days	
13	Earl E. Anderson	Lieutenant General; Earl E. Anderson (1919–2015)	1 July 1971	1 April 1972	275 days	
14	George C. Axtell	Lieutenant General; George C. Axtell (1920–2011)	1 April 1972	1 September 1974	2 years, 153 days	
15	Robert L. Nichols	Lieutenant General; Robert L. Nichols (1922–2001)	1 September 1974	1 October 1976	2 years, 30 days	
16	Robert H. Barrow	Lieutenant General; Robert H. Barrow (1922–2008)	1 October 1976	1 July 1978	1 year, 273 days	
17	Edward Miller	Lieutenant General; Edward Miller (1922–1993)	1 July 1978	1 October 1980	2 years, 92 days	
Commanding General FMFLANT / II MEF / FMFEUR
18	Adolph G. Schwenk	Lieutenant General; Adolph G. Schwenk (1922–2004)	1 October 1980	1 July 1982	1 year, 273 days	
19	John H. Miller	Lieutenant General; John H. Miller (1925–2025)	1 July 1982	1 September 1984	2 years, 62 days	
20	Alfred M. Gray Jr.	Lieutenant General; Alfred M. Gray Jr. (1928–2024)	1 September 1984	1 July 1987	2 years, 303 days	
-	Clayton L. Comfort	Major General; Clayton L. Comfort (1930–2004); Acting	1 July 1987	1 September 1987	62 days	
21	Ernest T. Cook Jr.	Lieutenant General; Ernest T. Cook Jr. (1935–2000)	1 July 1987	1 July 1990	3 years, 0 days	
22	Carl E. Mundy Jr.	Lieutenant General; Carl E. Mundy Jr. (1935–2014)	1 July 1990	25 June 1991	359 days	
Commanding General FMFLANT / II MEF / Commander MARFORLANT / MARFOREUR / MARFORSOUTH
23	William M. Keys	Lieutenant General; William M. Keys (1937–2026)	25 June 1991	1 September 1994	3 years, 68 days	
24	Robert B. Johnston	Lieutenant General; Robert B. Johnston (1937–2023)	1 September 1994	August 1995	334 days	
25	Charles E. Wilhelm	Lieutenant General; Charles E. Wilhelm (born 1941)	August 1995	23 November 1997	2 years, 114 days	
Commanding General FMFLANT / Commander MARFORLANT / MARFOREUR / MARFORSOUTH
26	Peter Pace	Lieutenant General; Peter Pace (born 1945)	23 November 1997	8 September 2000	2 years, 290 days	
27	Raymond P. Ayres	Lieutenant General; Raymond P. Ayres (born 1944)	8 September 2000	15 August 2002	1 year, 341 days	
28	Martin R. Berndt	Lieutenant General; Martin R. Berndt (born 1941)	15 August 2002	15 August 2005	3 years, 0 days	
Commanding General FMFLANT / Commander MARFORCOM / MARFOREUR / MARFORSOUTH
29	Robert R. Blackman Jr.	Lieutenant General; Robert R. Blackman Jr. (born 1948)	15 August 2005	18 July 2007	1 year, 337 days	
Commanding General FMFLANT / Commander MARFORCOM / MARFORSOUTH
30	Joseph F. Weber	Lieutenant General; Joseph F. Weber (born 1950)	18 July 2007	1 August 2008	1 year, 14 days	
31	Richard F. Natonski	Lieutenant General; Richard F. Natonski (born 1951)	1 August 2008	17 August 2010	2 years, 16 days	
32	Dennis J. Hejlik	Lieutenant General; Dennis J. Hejlik (born 1947)	17 August 2010	20 July 2012	1 year, 338 days	
33	John M. Paxton Jr.	Lieutenant General; John M. Paxton Jr. (born 1951)	20 July 2012	13 December 2012	146 days	
-	W. Blake Crowe	Brigadier General; W. Blake Crowe (born 1967); Acting	13 December 2012	28 June 2013	197 days	
34	Richard T. Tryon	Lieutenant General; Richard T. Tryon (born c. 1954)	28 June 2013	1 July 2014	1 year, 3 days	
35	Robert B. Neller	Lieutenant General; Robert B. Neller (born 1953)	1 July 2014	23 September 2015	1 year, 84 days	
Commanding General FMFLANT / Commander MARFORCOM
-	Bradford J. Gering	Brigadier General; Bradford J. Gering (born 1967); Acting	23 September 2015	18 December 2015	86 days	
36	John E. Wissler	Lieutenant General; John E. Wissler (born 1956)	18 December 2015	14 August 2017	1 year, 239 days	
37	Mark A. Brilakis	Lieutenant General; Mark A. Brilakis (born 1958)	14 August 2017	3 July 2019	1 year, 323 days	
38	Robert F. Hedelund	Lieutenant General; Robert F. Hedelund (born 1961)	3 July 2019	25 October 2021	2 years, 114 days	
-	Michael E. Langley	Major General; Michael E. Langley (born c. 1963); Acting	25 October 2021	3 November 2021	9 days	
39	Michael E. Langley	Lieutenant General; Michael E. Langley (born c. 1963)	3 November 2021	4 August 2022	274 days	
-	John F. Kelliher III	Brigadier General; John F. Kelliher III; Acting	4 August 2022	30 August 2022	26 days	
40	Brian W. Cavanaugh	Lieutenant General; Brian W. Cavanaugh (born 1968)	30 August 2022	6 August 2024	1 year, 342 days	
41	Roberta L. Shea	Lieutenant General; Roberta L. Shea (born c. 1967)	6 August 2024	Incumbent	2 years, 10 days	

== History ==
- Advanced Base Force
- East Coast Expeditionary Force

== See also ==
- Fleet Marine Force, Pacific (FMFPAC)
- Marine Corps Forces, Pacific (MARFORPAC)
- Marine Corps Forces Command (MARCORCOM) [formerly Marine Corps Forces, Atlantic (MARFORLANT)]
