= Wisler =

Wisler may refer to:

== People ==
- Daniel Wisler (born 1980), American actor
- Matt Wisler (born 1992), American baseball player
- G. Clifton Wisler (1950–2006), American author of historical fiction books for young adults
- Yammi Wisler, electric guitarist for Habiluim, an Israeli, theatrical rock & polka band

== Other ==
- The Ohio-Indiana Mennonite Conference, also called Wisler Mennonites, an Old Order Mennonite group

== See also ==
- Wissler
- Whisler (disambiguation)
- Whistler (disambiguation)
