= United States Marine Corps Forces Command =

Service component command of the U.S. Marine Corps

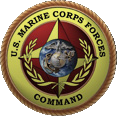
- Active: 13 July 1992 – present (as Marine Corps Forces Atlantic)
- Country: United States of America
- Branch: United States Marine Corps
- Type: Marine Combined arms
- Role: Amphibious and expeditionary warfare
- Garrison/HQ: Naval Support Activity Hampton Roads; Norfolk, VA

Commanders
- Commander: LtGen Roberta L. Shea
- Deputy Commander: BGen Thomas M. Armas
- Sergeant Major: SgtMaj David A. Wilson

Insignia
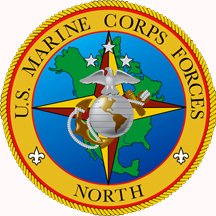
- Marine Corps Forces Northern Command

The Commander, U.S. Marine Corps Forces Command (COMMARFORCOM), headquartered at the Naval Support Activity Hampton Roads in Norfolk, Virginia, commands service retained-operating forces; executes force sourcing and synchronization to affect force generation actions in the provisioning of joint capable Marine Corps forces, and directs deployment planning and execution of service retained-operating forces in support of combatant commander (CCDR) and service requirements; serves as commanding general, Fleet Marine Force, Atlantic (CG FMFLANT) and commands embarked Marine Corps forces; coordinates Marine Corps-Navy integration of operational initiatives and advises CDR U.S. Fleet Forces Command (USFF) on support to Marine Corps forces assigned to naval ships, bases, and installations; conducts Service directed operational tasks as required. COMMARFORCOM is also the commander, Marine Corps Forces Northern Command (MARFORNORTH), the Marine service component command of U.S. Northern Command.

== History ==
It was established on 13 July 1992 as Marine Corps Forces, Atlantic (MARFORLANT), and was renamed Marine Corps Forces Command on 30 December 2004. Between 1994 and 1997 its headquarters was briefly moved to Camp Lejeune, North Carolina, before returning to Norfolk. The commander of Marine Forces Atlantic (since 2004 the Marine Corps Forces Command) is also simultaneously the commanding general, Fleet Marine Force, Atlantic (FMFLANT).

During the 1990s, Marine Forces Atlantic was one of the two active field commands of the Marine Corps, along with the U.S. Marine Corps Forces, Pacific (MARFORPAC). The Commander of MARFORLANT (and later MARFORCOM) was also simultaneously the Commander-designate of Marine Corps Forces Europe (MARFOREUR) and Marine Corps Forces South (MARFORSOUTH), while the Commander of MARFORPAC was the Commander-designate for Marine Corps Forces Central Command (MARCENT) and Marine Corps Forces Korea (MARFORK). The "designate" commands had a minimal staff during peacetime that would be activated and become part of a larger component command in the event of a war.

In 2015, both Marine Forces Europe/Africa and Marine Forces South became fully independent headquarters with dedicated commanders.

In 2020, the responsibility for leading Marine Corps Forces Northern Command (MARFORNORTH) was transferred to the commander of MARFORCOM, after previously being held by the commander of the U.S. Marine Corps Reserve.

== Organization ==
As COMMARFORCOM, commands Service retained-operational forces. As CG FMFLANT, commands Service retained-operational forces embarked aboard Naval shipping. As COMMARFORNORTH, advises the U.S. Northern Command on the usage of Marine Corps forces in homeland defense operations.

- Status and Command Relationships. MARFORCOM is a Service retained component headquarters with the following command relationships.
  - COMMARFORCOM reports to the Commandant of the Marine Corps (CMC).
  - COMMARFORCOM commands and exercises administrative control (ADCON) of the following subordinate commands:
    - II Marine Expeditionary Force (II MEF)
    - Headquarters and Service Battalion, U.S. Marine Corps Forces Command (HQSVCBN)
    - Marine Corps Security Cooperation Group (MCSCG)
    - Marine Corps Security Force Regiment (MCSFR)
    - Marine Corps Embassy Security Group (MCESG)
    - Chemical Biological Incident Response Force (CBIRF)
    - Marine Corps Information Command (MARCOR INFOCOM). The commander of Marine Corps Forces Cyberspace Command serves as the commanding general (CG) of MARCOR INFOCOM.

== List of commanders ==
No.	Commander		Term		
No.	Portrait	Name	Took office	Left office	Term length
Commander, United States Marine Corps Forces, Atlantic
1	William M. Keys	Lieutenant General; William M. Keys (born 1937)	July 1991	30 June 1994	~2 years, 364 days
2	Robert B. Johnston	Lieutenant General; Robert B. Johnston (1941–2023)	1 July 1994	August 1995	~1 year, 31 days
3	Charles E. Wilhelm	Lieutenant General; Charles E. Wilhelm (born 1941)	August 1995	23 November 1997	~2 years, 114 days
4	Peter Pace	Lieutenant General; Peter Pace (born 1945)	23 November 1997	8 September 2000	2 years, 290 days
5	Raymond P. Ayres	Lieutenant General; Raymond P. Ayres (born 1944)	8 September 2000	15 August 2002	1 year, 341 days
6	Martin R. Berndt	Lieutenant General; Martin R. Berndt (born 1941)	15 August 2002	15 August 2004	2 years, 0 days
7	Robert R. Blackman Jr.	Lieutenant General; Robert R. Blackman Jr. (born 1948)	15 August 2004	18 July 2007	2 years, 337 days
Commander, United States Marine Corps Forces Command
8	Joseph F. Weber	Lieutenant General; Joseph F. Weber (born 1950)	18 July 2007	1 August 2008	1 year, 14 days
9	Richard F. Natonski	Lieutenant General; Richard F. Natonski (born 1951)	1 August 2008	17 August 2010	2 years, 16 days
10	Dennis J. Hejlik	Lieutenant General; Dennis J. Hejlik (born 1947)	17 August 2010	20 July 2012	1 year, 338 days
11	John M. Paxton Jr.	Lieutenant General; John M. Paxton Jr. (born 1951)	20 July 2012	13 December 2012	146 days
-	W. Blake Crowe	Brigadier General; W. Blake Crowe (born 1967); Acting	13 December 2012	28 June 2013	197 days
12	Richard T. Tryon	Lieutenant General; Richard T. Tryon (born c. 1954)	28 June 2013	1 July 2014	1 year, 3 days
13	Robert B. Neller	Lieutenant General; Robert B. Neller (born 1953)	1 July 2014	23 September 2015	1 year, 84 days
-	Bradford J. Gering	Brigadier General; Bradford J. Gering (born 1967); Acting	23 September 2015	18 December 2015	86 days
14	John E. Wissler	Lieutenant General; John E. Wissler (born 1956)	18 December 2015	14 August 2017	1 year, 239 days
15	Mark A. Brilakis	Lieutenant General; Mark A. Brilakis (born 1958)	14 August 2017	3 July 2019	1 year, 323 days
16	Robert F. Hedelund	Lieutenant General; Robert F. Hedelund (born 1961)	3 July 2019	25 October 2021	2 years, 114 days
-	Michael E. Langley	Major General; Michael E. Langley (born c. 1963); Acting	25 October 2021	3 November 2021	9 days
17	Michael E. Langley	Lieutenant General; Michael E. Langley (born c. 1963)	3 November 2021	4 August 2022	274 days
-	John F. Kelliher III	Brigadier General; John F. Kelliher III; Acting	4 August 2022	30 August 2022	26 days
18	Brian W. Cavanaugh	Lieutenant General; Brian W. Cavanaugh (born 1968)	30 August 2022	6 August 2024	1 year, 342 days
19	Roberta L. Shea	Lieutenant General; Roberta L. Shea (born c. 1967)	6 August 2024	Incumbent	1 year, 150 days

== See also ==
U.S. Armed Forces operations commands

- United States Army Forces Command
- United States Fleet Forces Command
- Air Combat Command
- Space Operations Command
