= Wissler =

Wissler is a surname. Notable people with the surname include:

- Clark Wissler (1870–1947), American anthropologist
- Janina Wissler (born 1983), German model, actress and television host
- Janine Wissler (born 1981), German politician
- John Wissler, American lieutenant general
- Susan Wissler (1853–1939), American politician

== See also ==
- Susan Wissler House
- Wissler's syndrome
