= General Ayres =

General Ayres may refer to:

- Leonard Porter Ayres (1879–1946), U.S. Army brigadier general
- Raymond P. Ayres (born 1944), U.S. Marine Corps lieutenant general
- Romeyn B. Ayres (1825–1888), Union Army brigadier general and brevet major general
- Thomas E. Ayres (born 1962), U.S. Army major general
