= Roberta L. Shea =

US Marine Corps officer (born c. 1967)

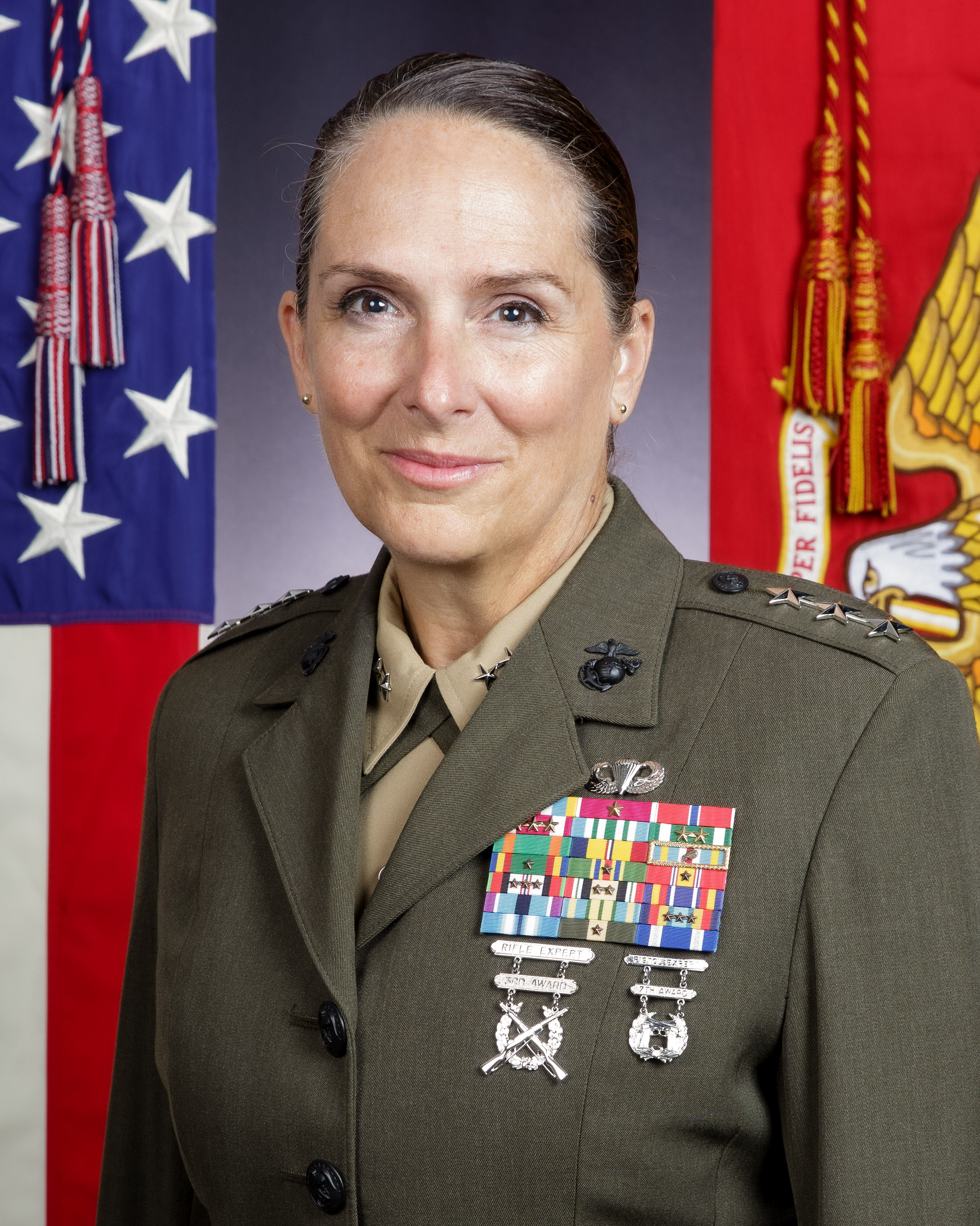
- Official portrait, 2024
- Born: c. 1967 (age 58–59)
- Education: United States Naval Academy (BS); Boston University (MS); Industrial College of the Armed Forces (MS)
- Military career
- Allegiance: United States
- Branch: United States Marine Corps
- Service years: 1985–2026
- Rank: Lieutenant General
- Nickname: "Bobbi"
- Commands: United States Marine Corps Forces Command; 1st Marine Logistics Group; 1 MEF Headquarters Group; 4th Recruit Training Battalion
- Conflicts: War in Afghanistan; Iraq War
- Awards: Defense Superior Service Medal; Legion of Merit (2); Bronze Star Medal

Roberta L. Shea (born c. 1967) is a retired United States Marine Corps Lieutenant General who served as the Commander of United States Marine Corps Forces Command from August 6, 2024 to August 5, 2026. She previously served as the legislative assistant to the Commandant of the Marine Corps from 2021 to 2024 and Commanding General of the 1st Marine Logistics Group from 2019 to 2021.

== Early military career and education ==
Shea began her Marine Corps career in the enlisted ranks. She entered recruit training in January 1985 at MCRD Parris Island. She entered a "non-traditional MOS", training as a ground support equipment mechanic, then served with 2nd Marine Aircraft Wing at Marine Corps Air Station Cherry Point, North Carolina. After two and a half years, she applied to and was accepted into the United States Naval Academy. She received her commission in 1991 and was assigned as a communications officer.

Shea's military education includes graduating as an honor graduate from both the Marine Corps Basic Communications Officers Course and the Amphibious Warfare School, and as the Commandant's Distinguished Graduate from the Industrial College of the Armed Forces, National Defense University. She has also earned a Master of Science in Computer Information Systems from Boston University in 2000 and a Master of Science in National Resource Strategy from the Industrial College of the Armed Forces in 2011.

== Marine officer career ==
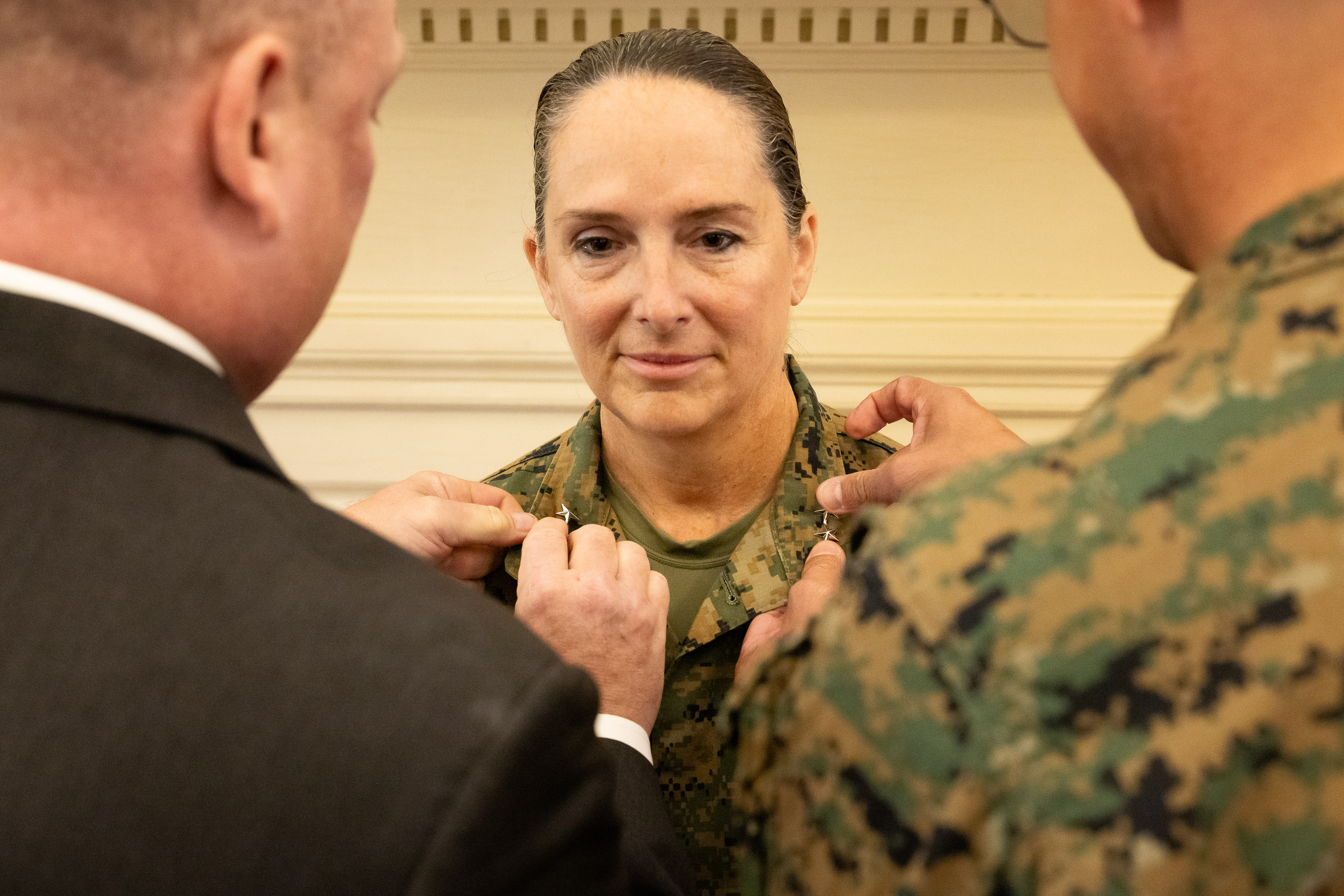
Roberta Shea receiving third star in promotion ceremony (August 6, 2024)

Shea's operational assignments have included: platoon commander and company commander with the 2nd Landing Support Battalion, 2nd Force Service Support Group; company commander with Marine Wing Communications Squadron 38, 3rd Marine Aircraft Wing; S-6 Officer for the 22nd Marine Expeditionary Unit for deployments to Afghanistan and Iraq; Director of the Commander's Initiatives Group for the Commander, International Security Assistance Force, Afghanistan; Assistant Chief of Staff G-6, 3d Marine Aircraft Wing; and Commanding Officer, I Marine Expeditionary Force Headquarters Group.

Shea has also served as a series commander, company commander, and battalion commander with 4th Recruit Training Battalion, as the Assistant Director of the Drill Instructor School, Marine Corps Recruit Depot Parris Island; as a White House Fellow and Special Assistant to the Homeland Security Advisor; as a Strategic Analyst with the Strategic Initiatives Group, Headquarters, Marine Corps; as the Director, Commandants Staff Group, Headquarters, Marine Corps; as the Deputy Commandant of Midshipmen, United States Naval Academy; and as Acting Deputy Assistant Secretary of Defense for East Asia.

Shea assumed duties as the Commanding General of the 1st Marine Logistics Group in July 2019. Notably, in this role, she launchedthe Artemis Program, which provides supports and resources for Marine Corps mothers.

In April 2021, Shea was appointed Legislative Assistant to the Commandant of the Marine Corps. In December 2021, she was nominated for promotion to the rank of Major General by President Joe Biden.

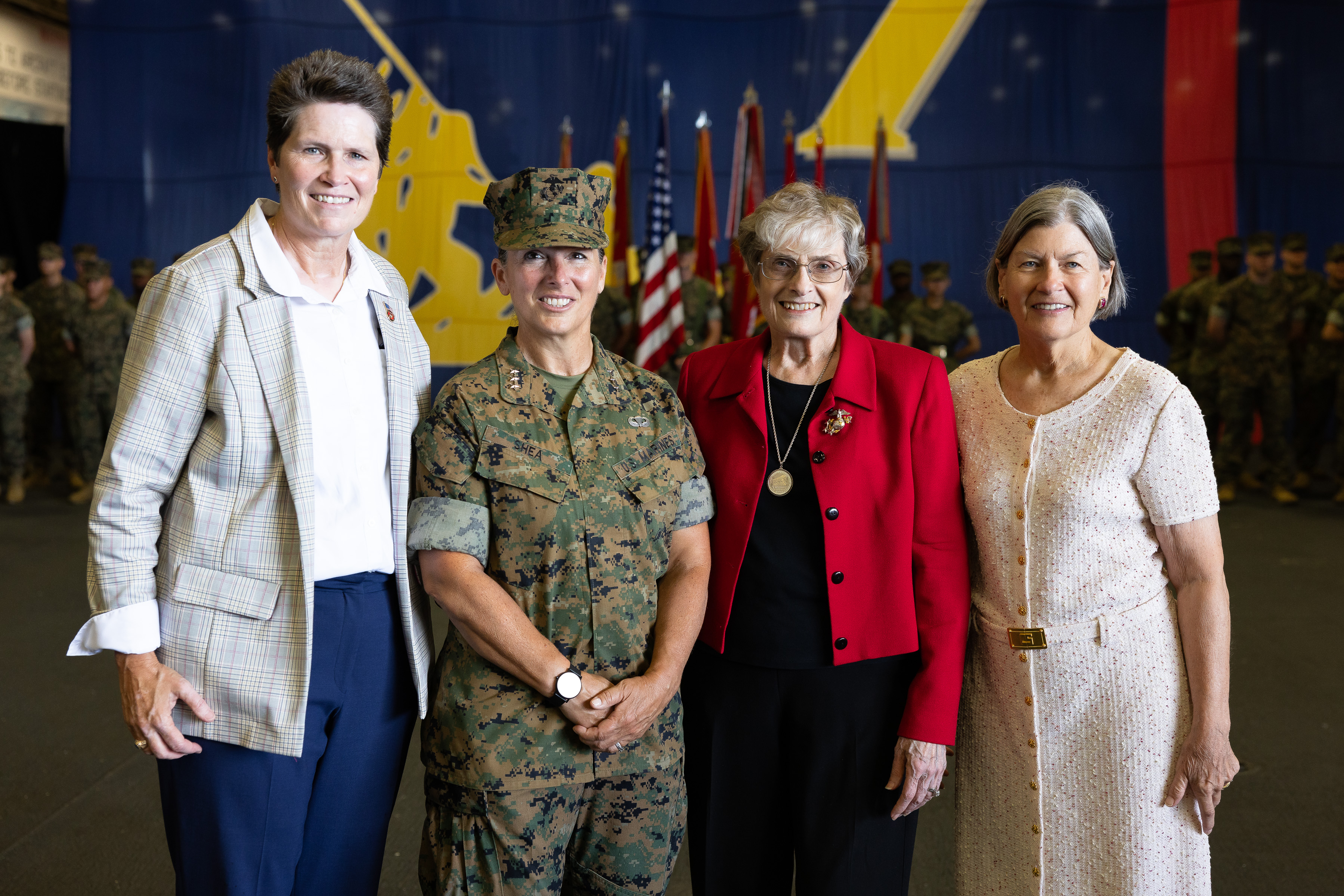
U.S. Marine Corps LtGen Roberta L Shea (center left) at change of command ceremony as incoming Commanding General MARFORCOM, with retired Lieutenant Generals – Carol A. Mutter (center right), Lori Reynolds (left), Frances C. Wilson (right)

In April 2024, Shea was nominated for promotion to Lieutenant General and assignment as Commander of the United States Marine Corps Forces Command, Fleet Marine Force, Atlantic, and Marine Forces North. On August 6, 2024, the change of command ceremony was held aboard the USS Iwo Jima. In attendance at the ceremony were three retired female Marine Corps Lieutenant Generals - Carol A. Mutter, Lori Reynolds, and Frances C. Wilson.

== Awards ==
Shea's decorations and medals include:

US Army Airborne basic parachutist badge
Defense Superior Service Medal
| Bronze Star medal | Legion of Merit with award star | Navy Commendation Medal with two gold award stars | Meritorious Service Medal with three gold award stars |
| Joint Meritorious Unit Award with three award stars | Navy and Marine Corps Achievement Medal | Combat Action Ribbon | Joint Meritorious Unit Award with one Oak leaf cluster |
| U.S. Navy Unit Commendation with one bronze service star | Navy Meritorious Unit Commendation with bronze service star | National Defense Service Medal with bronze service star | Afghanistan Campaign Medal with three bronze service stars |
| Iraq Campaign Medal with two bronze service stars | Global War on Terrorism Service Medal | Humanitarian Service Medal | Navy Arctic Service Medal |
| Military Outstanding Volunteer Service Medal | Sea Service Ribbon with three award stars | U.S. Marine Corps Drill Instructor Ribbon with bronze service star | NATO Medal Non-Article 5 |
| Expert Rifle Badge(3rd award) | | Expert Pistol Badge(7th award) | |

Military offices
| Preceded by Stephen Sklenka | Commanding General of the 1st Marine Logistics Group; 2019–2021 | Succeeded by Phillip N. Frietze |
| Preceded by Robert C. Fulford | Legislative Assistant to the Commandant of the Marine Corps; 2021–2024 | Succeeded by Adolfo Garcia Jr. |
| Preceded by Brian W. Cavanaugh | Commander of the United States Marine Corps Forces Command; 2024–2026 | Succeeded by Calvert L. Worth Jr. |
