= Michael Langley =

American general

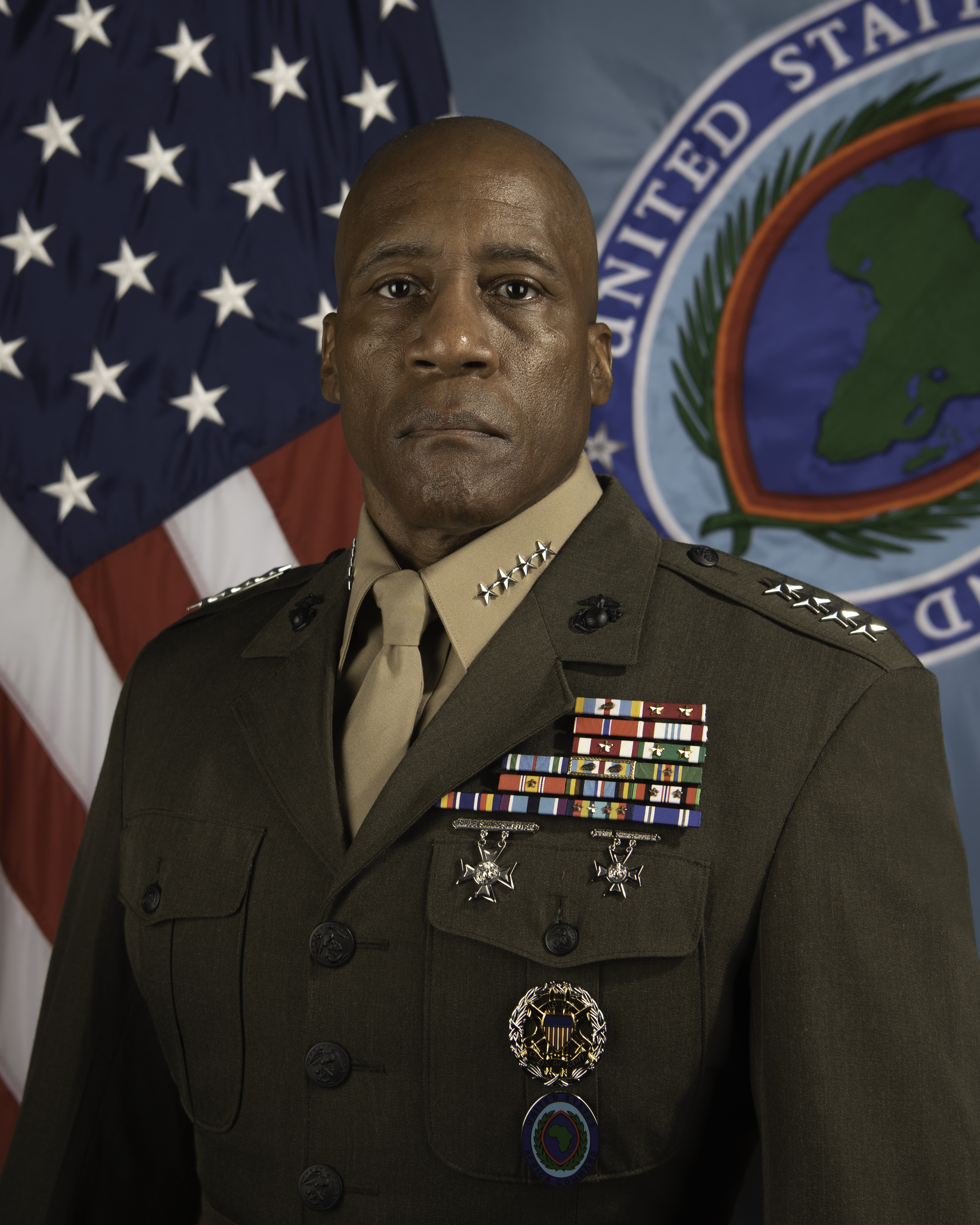
- Born: Michael Elliott Langley; 1961 (age 64–65); Shreveport, Louisiana, U.S.
- Allegiance: United States
- Branch: United States Marine Corps
- Service years: 1985–2025
- Rank: General
- Commands: United States Africa Command; United States Marine Corps Forces Command; Fleet Marine Force, Atlantic; United States Marine Forces Europe and Africa; 2nd Marine Expeditionary Brigade
- Conflicts: War in Afghanistan
- Awards: Defense Superior Service Medal (2); Legion of Merit (3); Bronze Star
- Alma mater: University of Texas, Arlington (BBA); Naval War College (MS); United States Army War College (MS)
- Michael Langley's voice Langley's opening statement at his confirmation hearing before the Senate Armed Services Committee to be commander of U.S. Africa Command; Recorded 21 July 2022

Michael Elliott Langley (born 1961) is a retired American general who last served as the commander of the United States Africa Command from 2022 to 2025. He most recently served as commander of United States Marine Corps Forces Command, United States Marine Corps Forces Northern Command, and Fleet Marine Force, Atlantic from 2021 to 2022. He also served as deputy commander of Fleet Marine Force, Atlantic and before that as commander of United States Marine Forces Europe and Africa.

Langley is the first black four-star general in the United States Marine Corps, having been promoted to that rank on 6 August 2022.

== Early life and education ==
A native of Shreveport, Louisiana, Langley graduated from the University of Texas at Arlington, where he majored in information systems analysis. Langley's father was a master sergeant in the United States Air Force. When his father retired from the military in the early 1970s, the family moved to a civilian neighborhood in Texas. His father, Willie C. Langley, retired when he was told he would be deployed overseas again, separating him from his children. He was the primary caregiver for his children after their mother's death.

Langley holds a master's degree in national security strategic studies from the Naval War College and a master's degree in strategic studies from the United States Army War College.

== Military career ==
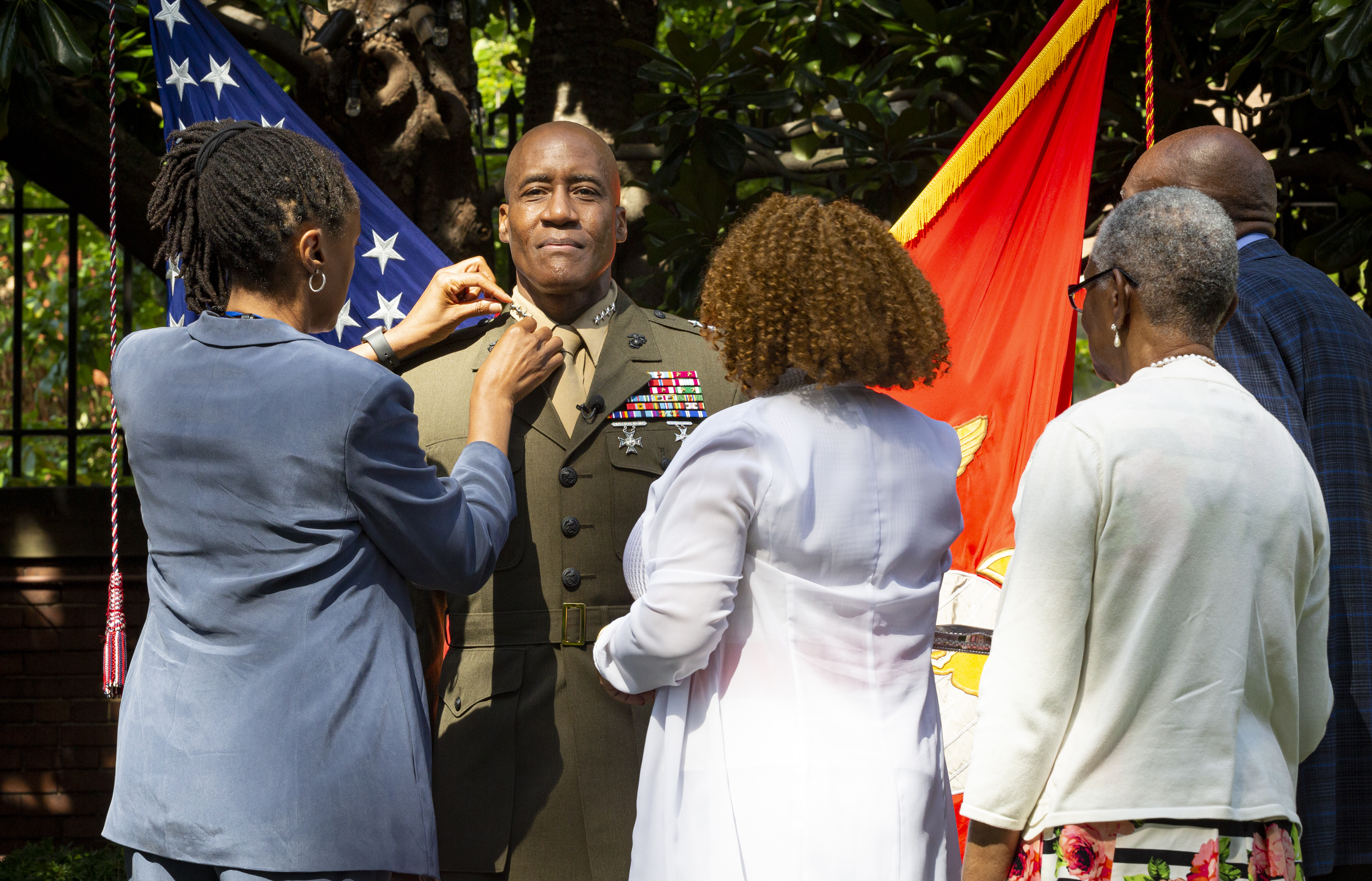
Langley is promoted to general in a ceremony at Marine Barracks Washington on August 6, 2022.

While attending college, Langley entered the Platoon Leaders Course (PLC) program in 1983, and was commissioned as an Artillery Officer in 1985 through Officer Candidates School. Langley was a platoon commander in Hotel Company, 3rd Battalion, 10th Marines. He commanded at every level from platoon to regiment – including Battery K, 5th Battalion, 11th Marines in support of Operation Wildfire in Western United States; battalion and regimental commands in 12th Marines forward deployed in Okinawa, Japan; and both the 201st Regional Corps Advisory Command-Central and Regional Support Command – Southwest in support of Operation Enduring Freedom in Afghanistan.

As a General Officer, Langley's command assignments include Deputy Commanding General, II Marine Expeditionary Force (MEF) and Commanding General, 2nd Marine Expeditionary Brigade; Commander, Marine Forces Europe and Africa; and Deputy Commanding General, Fleet Marine Force, Atlantic and Deputy Commander, Marine Forces Command and Marine Forces Northern Command.

=== Four-star general ===
In June 2022, Langley was nominated for promotion to general and assignment as commander of United States Africa Command. The nomination was confirmed by the Senate in August 2022, making him the first black four-star general in the 246-year history of the Marine Corps. He assumed command on 6 August 2022.

Langley made his first visit to the continent from 28–31 August, visiting Camp Lemonnier in Djibouti. He made his first visit to the Sahel region from 18–21 September 2022, meeting senior officials in Niger and Chad. He emphasized the respect for democracy and human rights was critical to countering extremist movements in the region. Langley visited North Africa for the first time from 17–19 October 2022, meeting with defense officials in Morocco and Tunisia, which he described as important for regional security and maritime security on NATO's southern flank.

In May 2024, Langley said that the U.S. remained in contact with the military juntas in Niger and Chad, despite the withdrawal of troops from those countries.

== Awards and decorations ==

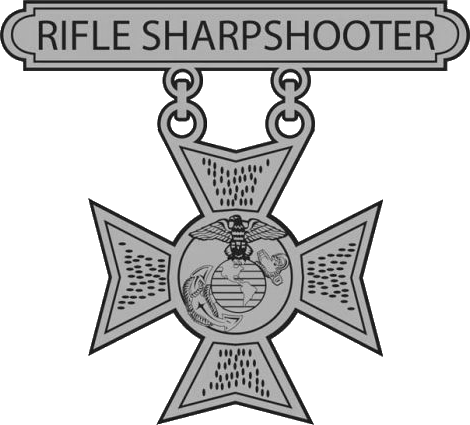

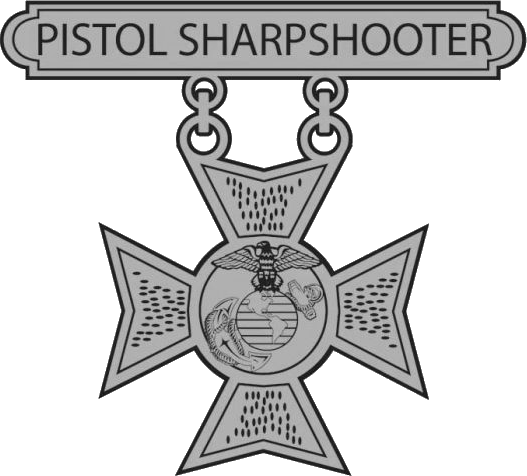

1st row	Defense Superior Service Medal with one bronze oak leaf cluster	Legion of Merit with two gold award stars	Bronze Star Medal	Defense Meritorious Service Medal
2nd row	Meritorious Service Medal with award star	Navy and Marine Corps Commendation Medal with two award stars	Joint Service Achievement Medal	Joint Meritorious Unit Award with two bronze oak leaf clusters
3rd row	Navy Meritorious Unit Commendation with one bronze service star	National Defense Service Medal with service star	Armed Forces Expeditionary Medal	Afghanistan Campaign Medal with two service stars
4th row	Global War on Terrorism Service Medal	Humanitarian Service Medal	Navy Sea Service Deployment Ribbon with one silver and three bronze service stars	NATO Medal for ISAF
Badges	Marine Corps Rifle Sharpshooter Badge		Marine Corps Pistol Sharpshooter Badge	
Badges	Joint Chiefs of Staff Identification Badge		United States Africa Command Badge	

Military offices
Preceded by Stephen M. Neary	Commander of United States Marine Forces Europe and Africa; 2020–2021	Succeeded by Tracy W. King
Preceded by Robert F. Hedelund	Commander of United States Marine Corps Forces Command; 2021–2022	Succeeded by John Kelliher; Acting
Preceded by Stephen J. Townsend	Commander of the United States Africa Command; 2022–2025	Succeeded by Dagvin Anderson
U.S. order of precedence (ceremonial)
Preceded by Michael E. Kurilla as Commander of U.S. Central Command	Order of precedence of the United States as Commander of U.S. Africa Command	Succeeded by Bryan P. Fenton as Commander of U.S. Special Operations Command
