= Brian W. Cavanaugh =

U.S. Marine Corps general

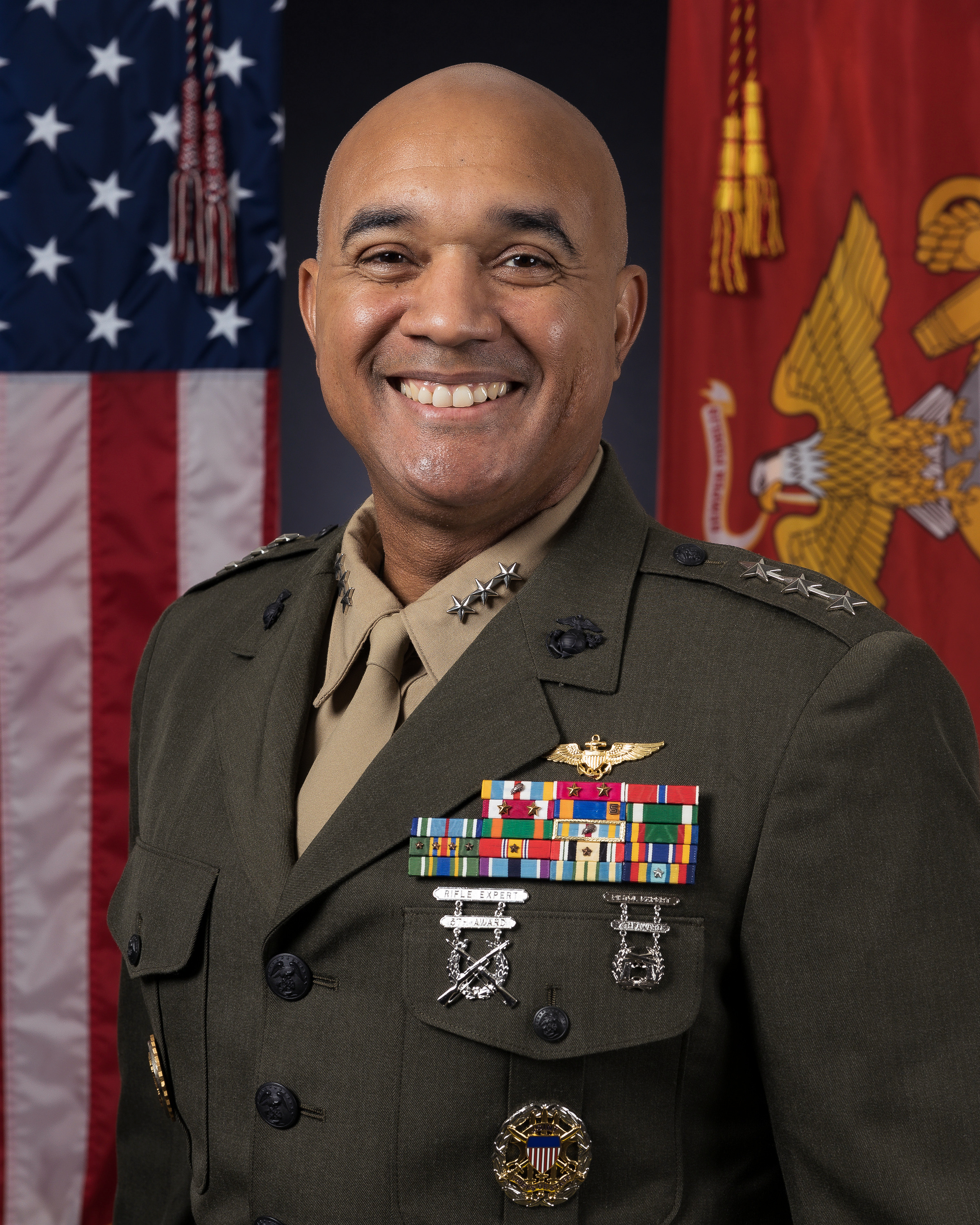
- Official portrait, 2023
- Born: Baltimore, Maryland, U.S.
- Military career
- Allegiance: United States
- Branch: United States Marine Corps
- Service years: 1990–2024
- Rank: Lieutenant General
- Commands: United States Marine Corps Forces Command; United States Marine Corps Forces Northern Command; Fleet Marine Force, Atlantic; 1st Marine Aircraft Wing; Marine Aircraft Group 36; VMM-362
- Awards: Defense Superior Service Medal (2); Legion of Merit (3); Bronze Star Medal

Brian Woodburn Cavanaugh is a retired United States Marine Corps lieutenant general who served as the commander of the United States Marine Corps Forces Command and Fleet Marine Force, Atlantic from 2022 to 2024. He served as Commanding General of the 1st Marine Aircraft Wing from 2021 to 2022, and previously served as the Assistant Deputy Commandant for Programs of the United States Marine Corps.

Cavanaugh attended the United States Naval Academy, graduating with a B.S. degree in mechanical engineering in 1990. After completing flight school, he was designated a naval aviator in 1992. Cavanaugh later earned an M.B.A. degree from Webster University and an M.S. degree in national resource strategy from the Industrial College of the Armed Forces at the National Defense University.

Military offices
Preceded by ???	Deputy Commander of the United States Marine Corps Forces Pacific; 2016–2018	Succeeded by Robert Sofge
Preceded by Edward Banta	Assistant Deputy Commandant for Programs of the United States Marine Corps; 2019–2021	Succeeded by Daniel L. Shipley
Preceded by Christopher A. McPhillips	Commanding General of the 1st Marine Aircraft Wing; 2021–2022	Succeeded by Eric E. Austin
Preceded by John F. Kelliher III; Acting	Commander of the United States Marine Corps Forces Command; 2022–2024	Succeeded by Roberta L. Shea
