= Chemical Biological Incident Response Force =

CBRE Response unit in the United States Marine Corps

Chemical Biological Incident Response Force (CBIRF)
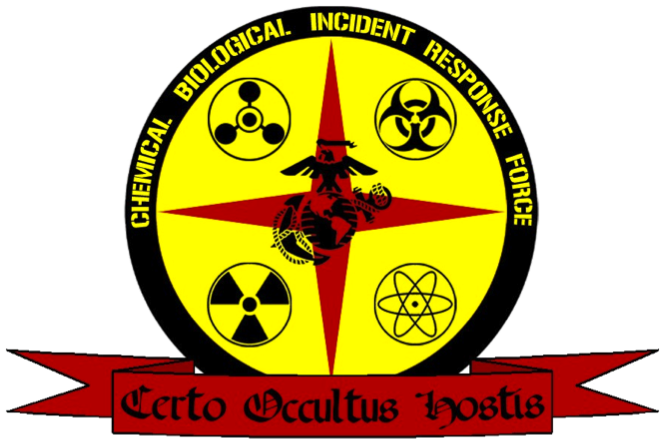
- CBIRF insignia
- Active: April 1, 1996 – present
- Country: United States
- Branch: USMC
- Role: CBRNE defense
- Size: ~ 600 Marines, Sailors and Civilian Contractors
- Part of: United States Marine Corps Forces Command
- Garrison/HQ: Indian Head Naval Surface Warfare Center
- Nicknames: The 'Birf, Birfsoc
- Mottos: Latin: Certo Occultus Hostis; To Fight Hidden Threats
- Colors: Black, Red, Gold

Commanders
- Commanding Officer: Colonel Zeb B. Beasley
- Sergeant Major: SgtMaj Paul A. Forde

The Chemical Biological Incident Response Force (CBIRF) is a Marine Corps unit responsible for countering the effects of a chemical, biological, radiological, nuclear, or high-yield explosive (CBRNE) incident, support counter CBRN terrorism, and urban search and rescue during a CBRN incident. They were activated in April 1996 by General Charles C. Krulak, then Commandant of the Marine Corps. The unit is based at Naval Support Facility Indian Head in Indian Head, Maryland and falls under the command of the United States Marine Corps Forces Command.

== Mission ==
When directed, a CBIRF unit will forward-deploy and/or respond to a credible threat of a chemical, biological, radiological, nuclear, or high-yield explosive (CBRNE) incident in order to assist local, state, or federal agencies and Unified Combat Commanders in the conduct of consequence management operations.

CBIRF accomplishes this mission by providing capabilities for CBRN agent detection and identification, casualty search and extraction, technical rescue, personnel decontamination, and tactical emergency medical care and stabilization of contaminated victims. All CBIRF Marines and sailors are trained to perform both casualty extraction and decontamination. The lifesaving competencies required of personnel serving at CBIRF are taught during CBIRF Basic Operations Course (CBOC). By completing CBOC, all Marines and Sailors are able to support CBIRF's mission, and bolster the current response force.

== History ==
Since its inception CBIRF has trained many local agencies. It has also had a presence at the following:

- 1996 Summer Olympic Games
- 1997 Presidential Inaugural Ceremony
- 1997 Denver Summit of the Eight
- 1997-2020 Presidential State of the Union Addresses
- 1999 Pope Visit to St Louis, MO
- 1999 NATO Summit
- 2001 Presidential Inaugural Ceremony
- 2001 Cleaned Anthrax out of the Longworth House Office Bldg in Washington, DC
- 2001 Cleaned Anthrax out of the Hart Senate Bldg in Washington DC
- 2004 Ricin Incident Attack on Dirksen Senate Building
- 2004 Dedication of World War II Memorial
- 2004 Lying In State of President Ronald W. Reagan
- 2005 Presidential Inaugural Ceremony
- 2008 Republican National Convention in St. Paul, MN
- 2009 Presidential Inaugural Ceremony
- 2011 Operation Tomodachi
- 2012 NATO Summit
- 2013 Presidential Inaugural Ceremony
- 2016 State of the Union Address
- 2016 Republican and Democratic National Conventions
- 2017 Presidential Inaugural Ceremony
- 2018 State of the Union Address
- 2019 State of the Union Address
- 2020 State of the Union Address
- 2020 Republican and Democratic National Conventions
- 2021 Presidential Inaugural Ceremony
- 2021 Presidential Address to Congress
- 2023 State of the Union Address
- 2024 State of the Union Address
- 2024 Republican National Convention
- 2024 Democratic National Convention
- 2024 Presidential Campaign Trail (Augmented United States Secret Service HAMMER)
- 2024 Palisades Fire HAZMAT Clean Up, California
- 2025 January 6th Ballot Certification
- 2025 President Carter's Funeral
- 2025 Presidential Inauguration
- 2025 Presidential Address to Congress
- 2025 United States Army's 250th Birthday Parade
- 2026 State of the Union Address

== Awards ==
| Ribbon | Award |
|---|---|
| | Meritorious Unit Commendation streamer with 2 bronze stars |
| | National Defense Service streamer with 1 bronze star |
| | Global War on Terrorism Service streamer |

== See also ==
- 2001 anthrax attacks – Bioterrorist attacks in the United States
- 2003 ricin letters – Attempted bioterrorist attacks
- Chemical, Biological, Radiological and Explosive Defence Group in Singapore
- CBRN defense – Protective measures against hazardous materials warfare
- Fukushima Daiichi nuclear disaster – 2011 nuclear accident in Japan
- History of the United States Marine Corps
- Organization of the United States Marine Corps
