= Robert B. Johnston =

American military general (1937–2023)

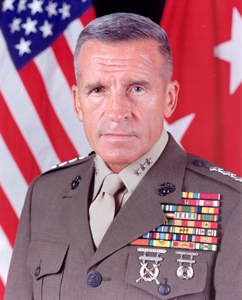
- Johnston c. 1993
- Born: Robert Ballantyne Johnston; 6 October 1937; Edinburgh, Scotland
- Died: 19 October 2023 (aged 86)
- Military career
- Allegiance: United States
- Branch: United States Marine Corps
- Service years: 1961–1995
- Rank: Lieutenant General
- Commands: II Marine Expeditionary Force; Marine Forces Europe; Fleet Marine Force, Atlantic; Camp Pendleton; I Marine Expeditionary Force; Officer Candidates School; 8th Marine Regiment; 2nd Battalion, 8th Marines
- Conflicts: Vietnam War; Gulf War; Operation Restore Hope
- Awards: Defense Distinguished Service Medal; Legion of Merit; Bronze Star Medal

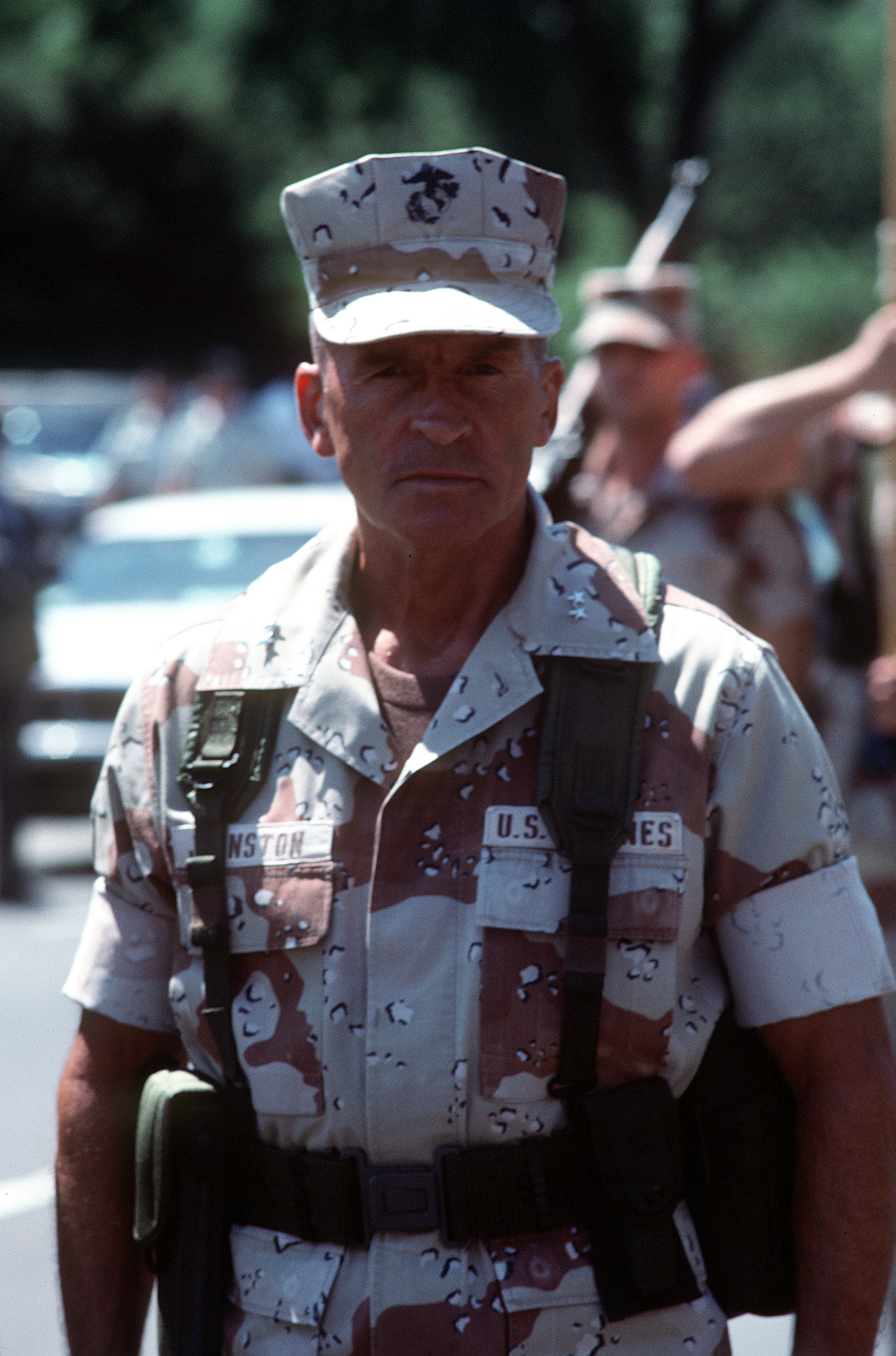
Robert B. Johnston in 1991 at National Victory Celebration.

Robert Ballantyne Johnston (6 October 1937 – 19 October 2023) was a United States Marine Corps lieutenant general whose last duty assignment was as Commander, Marine Forces Atlantic, Marine Forces Europe and II Marine Expeditionary Force. During the Gulf War, he served as the Central Command Chief-of-Staff. He retired from the Marine Corps in 1995 after over 34 years of service. Johnston died on 19 October 2023, at the age of 86.

== Early life and education ==
Robert Ballantyne Johnston was born in Edinburgh, Scotland on 6 October 1937. He immigrated to the United States in 1955 and graduated from San Diego State College with a Bachelor of Arts in English in 1961. He received a Master of Business Administration from the United States International University in 1975. He was also a member of the Pi Kappa Alpha fraternity.

== Military career ==
=== Early career ===
Johnston was commissioned a second lieutenant in the United States Marine Corps in December 1961. His first tour of duty was with the 1st Marine Brigade in Hawaii as a Rifle Platoon Commander, Company Executive Officer and Assistant Regimental S-3, respectively. In May 1965, he deployed with the Brigade to Vietnam, where he served as Assistant Regimental S-3. He served a second tour in Vietnam from 1967 to 1968, as a Rifle Company Commander in the 3rd Battalion, 9th Marines and as Assistant G-2, 3rd Marine Division. He was promoted to first lieutenant in June 1963 and captain in September 1965.

Between his Vietnam tours, Johnston served as Commanding Officer, Guard Company, \ Headquarters Marine Corps, Washington, D.C., from July 1965 to October 1966. Transferring to Marine Corps Base Quantico, he completed the Amphibious Warfare School in July 1968, and was subsequently assigned to Marine Corps Recruit Depot, San Diego, California, in August, where he served as Assistant G-3, Staff Secretary and Executive Officer of 2nd Recruit Training Battalion until August 1972. He was promoted to major in October 1971.

Following an assignment to the Joint U.S. Military Advisory Group in Korea from 1972 to 1973, Johnston completed graduate school in San Diego in March 1975. He returned to Headquarters Marine Corps for a three-year tour serving in the Manpower Plans and Policy Division as Manpower Systems Analyst, then as Head, Enlisted Plans Section. While at Headquarters, he was promoted to lieutenant colonel in March 1978.

From August 1978 to June 1979, Johnston was a student at the National War College, Washington, D.C., then assumed duties as the Aide-de-Camp to the Commandant of the Marine Corps (June 1979 to May 1981).

Johnston then assumed command of 2nd Battalion, 8th Marines at Camp Lejeune, North Carolina from July 1981 to February 1983, and commanded the 8th Marine Regiment from 8 February 1983 to 22 May 1984. He was promoted to colonel in May 1983 while at Camp Lejeune. Johnston relinquished command of 8th Marines to Col. John P. Brickley.

=== General officer ===
Johnston was assigned to Quantico in May 1984 to assume command of Officer Candidates School. While serving in this capacity, he was selected for promotion to brigadier general in December 1986. He was advanced to that grade on 21 August 1987, and assumed duty as the Assistant Division Commander, 3rd Marine Division in September 1987. He was assigned additional duty as the Commanding General, 9th Marine Amphibious Brigade in November 1987. On 26 May 1988, General Johnston was assigned as the Commanding General, Marine Corps Base, Camp S.D. Butler. On 4 May 1990, he was promoted to major general and on 15 June 1990 he was assigned to United States Central Command as the Chief of Staff.

In August 1990, he deployed with CENTCOM to Saudi Arabia, where he served as the Chief of Staff to General Norman Schwarzkopf during Operations Desert Shield and Desert Storm. In May 1991, he returned to MacDill Air Force Base, Florida and was assigned as the Deputy Commander in Chief and Chief of Staff, United States Central Command.

Johnston was advanced to lieutenant general on 27 August 1991, and assumed duty as Commanding General, I Marine Expeditionary Force and Commanding General, Marine Corps Base Camp Pendleton, California, on 6 September 1991. He relinquished command of Marine Corps Base at Camp Pendleton on 19 June 1992. In December 1992, as Commanding General of I MEF, Johnston lead U.S. and allied troops in a United Nations mandated mission, Operation Restore Hope, to deliver relief supplies to Somalia.

On 8 July 1993 he assumed his final assignment as Commander, Fleet Marine Force, Atlantic, II Marine Expeditionary Force and Marine Forces Europe on 19 July 1993. Lieutenant General Johnston retired on 1 August 1995 after 34 years of service in the U.S. Marine Corps.

== Personal life ==
Johnston was a fitness enthusiast and a sports fan. He reportedly ran five miles every day and in his mid-fifties he achieved a perfect score on the Marine Physical Fitness Test. He was a fan of football, rugby, and soccer.

== Decorations and awards ==
Johnston's decorations include:

1st Row	Defense Distinguished Service Medal	Legion of Merit	Bronze Star Medal w/ valor device	Meritorious Service Medal w/ 1 award star
2nd Row	Joint Service Commendation Medal	Navy and Marine Corps Achievement Medal	Combat Action Ribbon	Navy Presidential Unit Citation
3rd Row	Joint Meritorious Unit Award	Navy Unit Commendation	Navy Meritorious Unit Commendation	Marine Corps Expeditionary Medal
4th Row	National Defense Service Medal w/ 1 service star	Armed Forces Expeditionary Medal	Vietnam Service Medal w/ 3 service stars	Southwest Asia Service Medal w/ 2 service stars
5th Row	Humanitarian Service Medal	Navy Sea Service Deployment Ribbon	Navy & Marine Corps Overseas Service Ribbon	Vietnam Gallantry Cross w/ silver star
6th Row	Order of the Phoenix	King Faisal Award, 2d Class	Vietnam Gallantry Cross unit citation	Vietnam Campaign Medal

== Notes ==
This article incorporates text in the public domain from the United States Marine Corps.

== Bibliography ==
- Frank, Benis M. (1987). U.S. Marines in Lebanon 1982–1984. Washington, D.C.: History and Museums Division, United States Marine Corps. Then-LtCol. Johnston commanded the BLT 2/8 in Beirut.
