= Robert F. Hedelund =

United States Marine Corps general

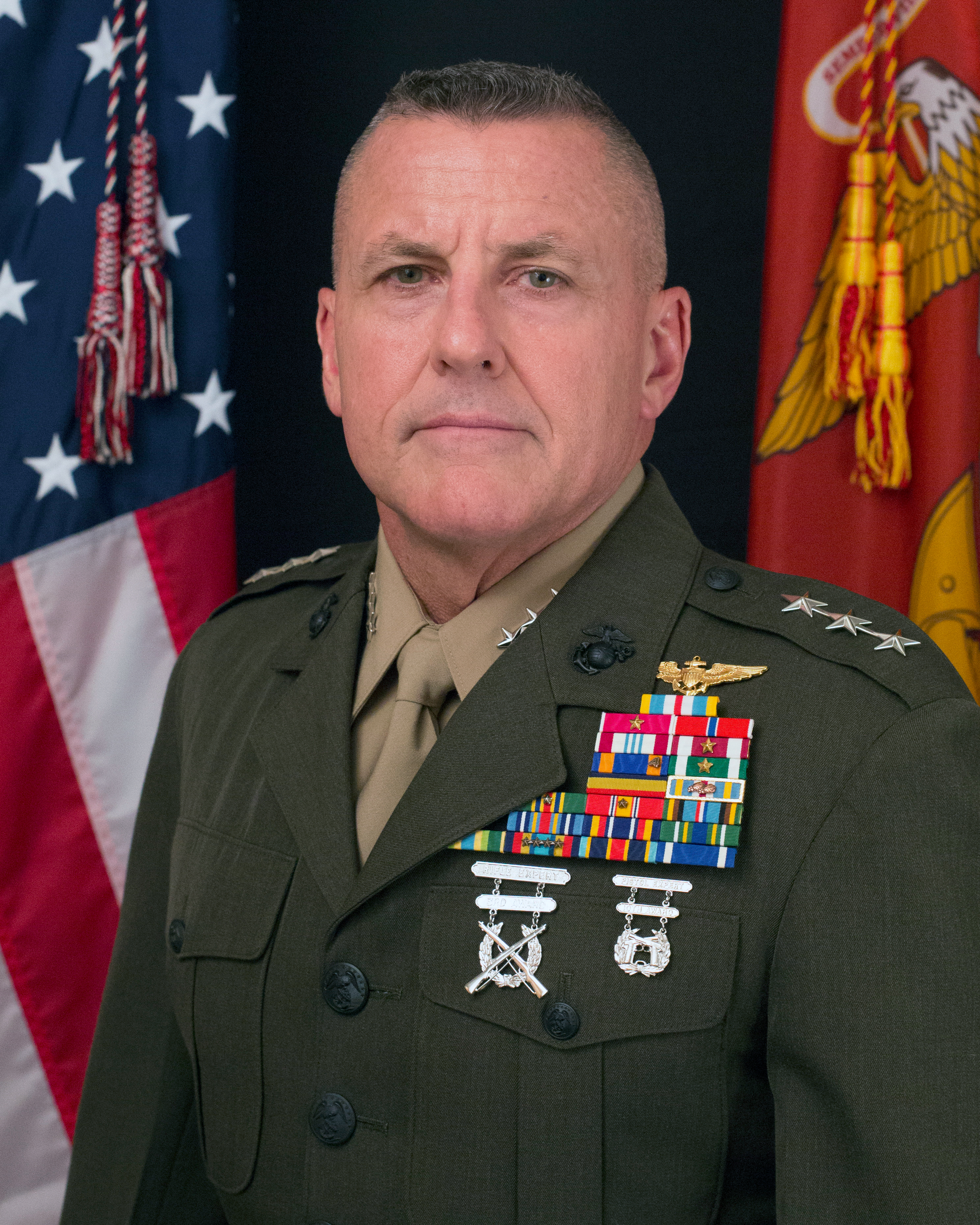
- Born: March 23, 1961 (age 65)
- Military career
- Allegiance: United States
- Branch: United States Marine Corps
- Service years: 1983–2021
- Rank: Lieutenant General
- Commands: United States Marine Corps Forces Command; II Marine Expeditionary Force; 2nd Marine Aircraft Wing; Marine Corps Warfighting Laboratory; MAWTS-1; HMM-162
- Awards: Defense Superior Service Medal; Legion of Merit (2); Bronze Star Medal

Robert Frederick Hedelund (born March 23, 1961) is a retired lieutenant general in the United States Marine Corps who serves as the commander of United States Marine Corps Forces Command, replacing Lieutenant General Mark A. Brilakis. He previously served as the commander of the II Marine Expeditionary Force. Hedelund was commissioned upon his graduation from Florida Atlantic University in 1983. He is from Pompano Beach, Florida. He graduated from Deerfield Beach High School.

He retired in 2021, with his retirement ceremony held on October 29, 2021. His younger sister is a physician. Robert attended Crystal Lake Middle School in Pompano Beach, Florida.

Military offices
Preceded by Christopher S. Owens	Commander of the United States Marine Corps Forces Korea; 2015–2017	Succeeded by James W. Lukeman
Preceded by Walter Lee Miller Jr.	Commander of the II Marine Expeditionary Force; 2017–2019	Succeeded by Brian Beaudreault
Preceded by Mark A. Brilakis	Commander of the United States Marine Corps Forces Command; 2019–2021	Succeeded by Michael E. Langley
