= Tracy W. King =

U.S. Marine Corps general

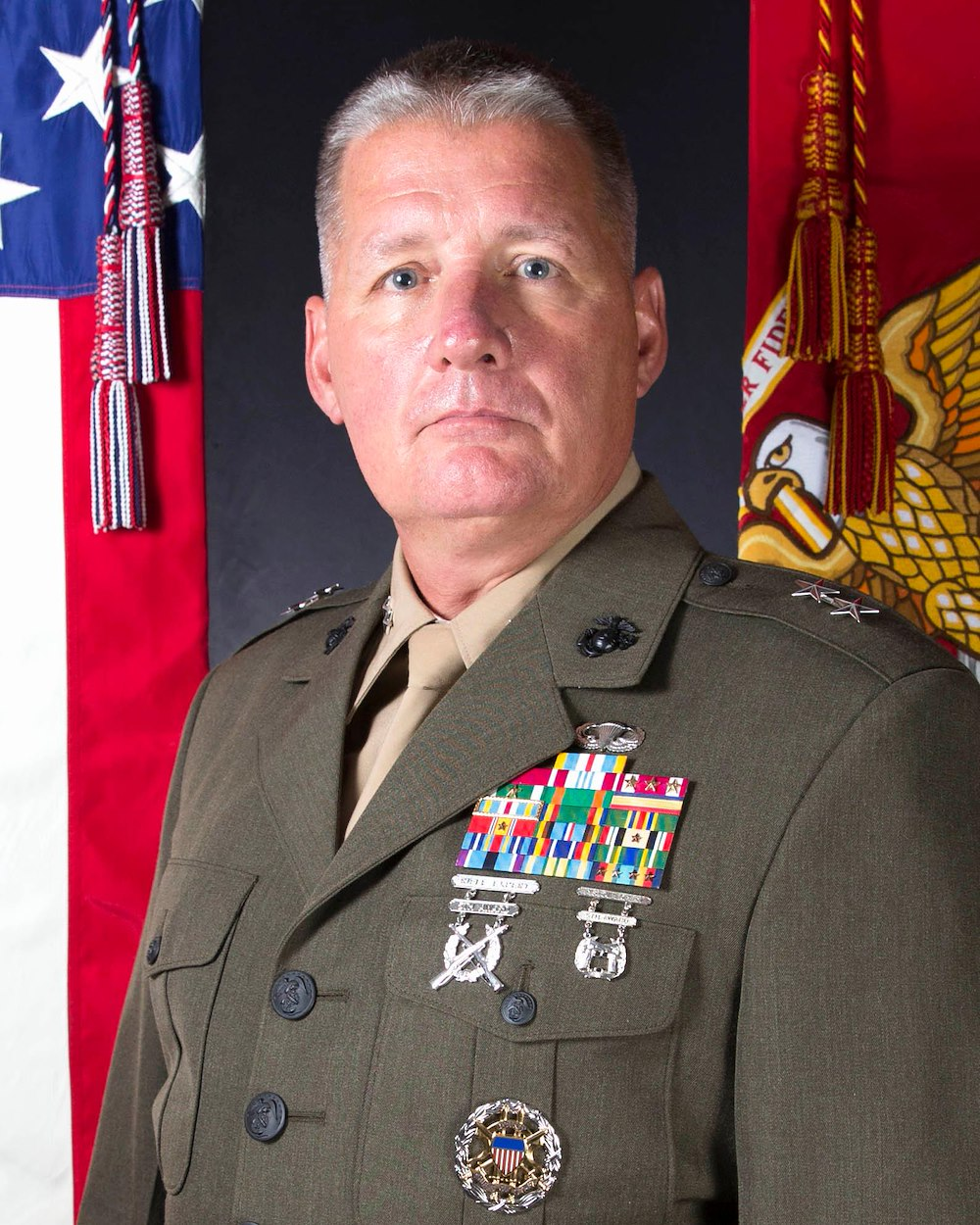
- Official portrait, 2016
- Born: Oklahoma City, Oklahoma, U.S.
- Military career
- Allegiance: United States
- Branch: United States Marine Corps
- Rank: Major General
- Commands: United States Marine Forces Europe and Africa; 3rd Marine Logistics Group; Combat Logistics Regiment 15
- Conflicts: Iraq War
- Awards: Defense Superior Service Medal; Legion of Merit

Tracy W. King is a United States Marine Corps major general who most recently served as the Commanding General of the United States Marine Forces Europe and Africa from May 6, 2021 to June 30, 2023. Previously, he served as the Director of Expeditionary Warfare advising the Chief of Naval Operations on all things expeditionary, and as the Director for Asia, advising the Chairman of the Joint Chiefs of Staff on all matters related to Asia.

Military offices
Preceded by Michael Langley	Commander of United States Marine Forces Europe and Africa; 2021–2023	Succeeded by Robert Sofge
