= 4th Recruit Training Battalion =

US Marine training battalion

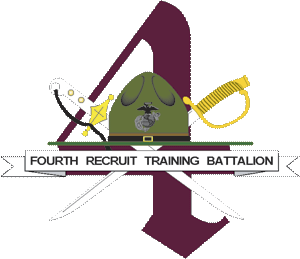
- 4th Recruit Training Battalion insignia
- Active: 1986 – June 15, 2023
- Country: United States of America
- Branch: United States Marine Corps
- Type: Training
- Part of: Marine Corps Recruit Depot Parris Island

Commanders
- Commander: Lt. Col. Aixa R. Dones
- Senior Enlisted Leader: Sgt. Maj. Jesabel Cuadro

4th Recruit Training Battalion was a training battalion in the United States Marine Corps at the Marine Corps Recruit Depot Parris Island. The battalion has been responsible for initial training for all female enlisted Marines in the entire Marine Corps since 1986. Since January 2021, the battalion has also been responsible for training enlisted male Marines.

== Subordinate units ==
- November Company
- Oscar Company
- Papa Company

Within 4th Recruit Training Battalion, there are three companies: November, Oscar, and Papa. Oscar Company, composed of three series, contains an average of two 60-80 recruit platoons. November Company, composed of two series, contains an average of two 60-70 recruit platoons. Papa and Oscar Company are gender integrated training companies since January 2021 and February 2022 respectively, and train both male and female recruits.

== History ==
Female Marines have trained on Parris Island since February 23, 1949, when the 3rd Recruit Training Battalion was activated. On May 1, 1954, 3rd Recruit Training Battalion was redesigned as Woman Recruit Training Battalion and remained under this designation until 1976 when it was redesigned as Woman Recruit Training Command. At that time, Woman Recruit Training Command moved to a new battalion complex, which it still occupies.

On November 1, 1986, Woman Recruit Training Command was redesigned as 4th Recruit Training Battalion and became part of the Recruit Training Regiment. It was the only unit for training enlisted female Marines. During January 1989, the 4th Recruit Training Battalion's companies were redesigned as November and Oscar companies due to reorganization of the regiment. In October 1996, Papa Company was activated in order to more effectively train the larger number of female recruits arriving on Parris Island. The 4th Recruit Training Battalion complex was expanded in November 2001 with the addition of a new barracks.

The battalion was deactivated during a ceremony on 15 June 2023.

Recruit training is now identical for both male and female recruits, but this is a result of many significant changes. Some of the key changes were:

1978 - First females graduate from Drill Instructor School
1985 - Females began firing the M16 for qualification, adding an additional three weeks to the female schedule.
1988 - Basic Warrior Training/Marine Combat Training was incorporated into recruit training for females, adding another two weeks to their schedule.
1996 - Female Drill Instructors were allowed to wear the campaign cover, replacing the scarlet shoulder cord.
1997 - Marine Combat Training was removed from the female recruit training schedule with the introducing of "The Crucible", resulting in the current 12-week schedule for both male and female recruits. Female marines subsequently began attending Marine Combat Training at the Marine Corps School of Infantry prior to follow-on specialty training.
2018 - 4th Recruit Training Battalion increased to eight series, executing training for female recruits under the same schedule as male recruits.

== See also ==
- List of United States Marine Corps battalions
- Organization of the United States Marine Corps
