= Whisler =

Whisler may refer to:

- Mount Whisler, Nunavut, Canada
- Whisler Island, Nunavut, Canada
- Whisler, Ohio, United States

== People with the surname ==
- Randy Whisler (born 1962), American baseball player
- Wes Whisler (born 1983), American baseball player

== See also ==
- Whistler (disambiguation)
