= Susan Wissler =

American politician

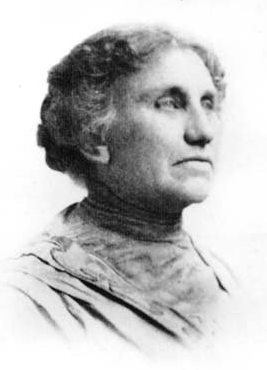

Mayor of Dayton, Wyoming
- In office 1911–1913

Personal details
- Born: February 23, 1853 Brodhead, Wisconsin
- Died: February 9, 1938 (aged 84) Dayton, Wyoming
- Occupation: Politician

Susan Ellen Wissler (born Susan Ellen Frisbie; February 23, 1853 – February 9, 1938) was the first female mayor in Wyoming and one of the first in the United States.

== Biography ==
Wissler was born in Brodhead, Wisconsin; she moved to Denver at age nine, where she ultimately married and had two children. In 1890, Wissler and her family moved to Dayton, Wyoming. Wissler's husband died of tuberculosis in 1896, leaving Wissler to support her family alone; she became a local schoolteacher and later opened a millinery store.

In 1911, a group of Dayton residents who were unhappy with the current mayor encouraged Wissler to run for mayor. Though Wissler initially rejected the idea, she eventually chose to run for office; her non-partisan campaign focused on improving Dayton's moral and financial welfare, as her opponent had been criticized for failing to license and regulate the town's saloons. Wissler won the election by a nine-vote majority, making her Wyoming's first female mayor. While she has been claimed to be the first female mayor in the United States, that honor belongs to Susanna M. Salter, who was elected mayor of Argonia, Kansas in 1887. Wissler was reelected twice and served three years in office; highlights of her tenure included heightened regulations on local saloons and the construction of Dayton's first water works.

After leaving office, Wissler moved to her daughter's ranch in Ashland, Montana in 1915. She retired to a rest home in Dayton in 1935, where she died in 1939. Her home in Dayton is listed on the National Register of Historic Places.
