= Whistler =

Whistler may refer to:

- Someone who whistles

== Places ==
=== Canada ===
- Whistler, British Columbia, a resort town
  - Whistler railway station
  - Whistler Secondary School
- Whistler Blackcomb, a ski resort in British Columbia
- Whistler Mountain, British Columbia
- The Whistlers (Alberta), a mountain in Alberta

=== United States ===
- Whistler, Alabama, an unincorporated town until the 1950s, when it was annexed into neighboring Prichard
- Whistler Geyser, Yellowstone National Park, Wyoming
- Whistler Mountain (Washington), a mountain summit in Washington state
- Whistler Range, Nevada, a mountain range

=== Elsewhere ===
- Whistler Nunatak, Palmer Land, Antarctica
- Whistler River, New Zealand

== People ==
- Alwyne Michael Webster Whistler (1909–1993), British Army general
- Anna McNeill Whistler (1804–1881), James Whistler's mother
- Arthur Whistler (1944–2020), American ethnobotanist
- Catherine Whistler is a British art historian and curator
- Charles Whistler (1856–1913), British writer
- George Washington Whistler (1800–1849), American civil engineer and railroad builder
- Harold Whistler (1896–1940), English First World War fighter ace
- Harvey Samuel Whistler (1907–1976), American violinist, pedagogue, composer, and arranger of music education method books
- Hugh Whistler (1889–1943), English police officer and ornithologist
- James McNeill Whistler (1834–1903), American painter
- Lashmer Whistler (1898–1963), British Army general
- Laurence Whistler (1912–2000), British glass engraver and poet
- Margaret Whistler (1888–1939), American actress and costume designer
- Rex Whistler (1905–1944), British painter
- William McNeill Whistler (1836–1900), physician, brother of James Whistler

== Animals ==
- Whistler (bird), a group of passerine birds in the family Pachycephalidae
- Goldeneye (duck), a Northern Hemisphere seaduck in the genus Bucephala
- Groundhog, American species of marmot
- Hoary marmot, American species of marmot

== Arts and entertainment ==
=== Fictional characters ===
- Whistler (Buffyverse), a character in the television series Buffy the Vampire Slayer
- Abraham Whistler, mentor to the Marvel Comics character Blade in film and animated continuity
- Coach Whistler, a mascot of The Land of Play in Pajanimals
- Erwin "Whistler" Emory, a character in the film Sneakers
- James Whistler (Prison Break character), mysterious inmate in the television series Prison Break's third season

=== Music ===
- Whistler (band), a UK indie band
- "The Whistler" (song), a 1977 single by the British rock group Jethro Tull
- "The Whistler", Fourplay's instrumental song on its 2008 album Energy

=== Television ===
- Whistler (TV series), set in Whistler, British Columbia
- The Whistler (TV series), television show of the 1950s

=== Other uses in arts and entertainment ===
- The Whistler (novel), a 2016 novel by John Grisham
- The Whistler (radio series), a mystery drama radio show and film noir series
  - The Whistler (1944 film), the first of eight films in the series
- Whistler (novel), a 2026 novel by Ann Patchett

== Other uses ==
- Whistler (radio), a very low frequency radio phenomenon caused by lightning
- CKEE-FM, identified on air and in print as "101.5 Whistler FM", a radio station in Whistler, British Columbia
- Whistler, the development codename for the Microsoft Windows XP computer operating system
- Whistler Group, a company specializing in electronics and automotive laser/radar detection systems
- USS Whistler (SP-784), a United States Navy patrol vessel in commission from 1917 to 1919
- The Whistler (newspaper), a Nigerian online newspaper

== See also ==
- Whisler (disambiguation)
