= Dennis Hejlik =

United States Marine Corps general

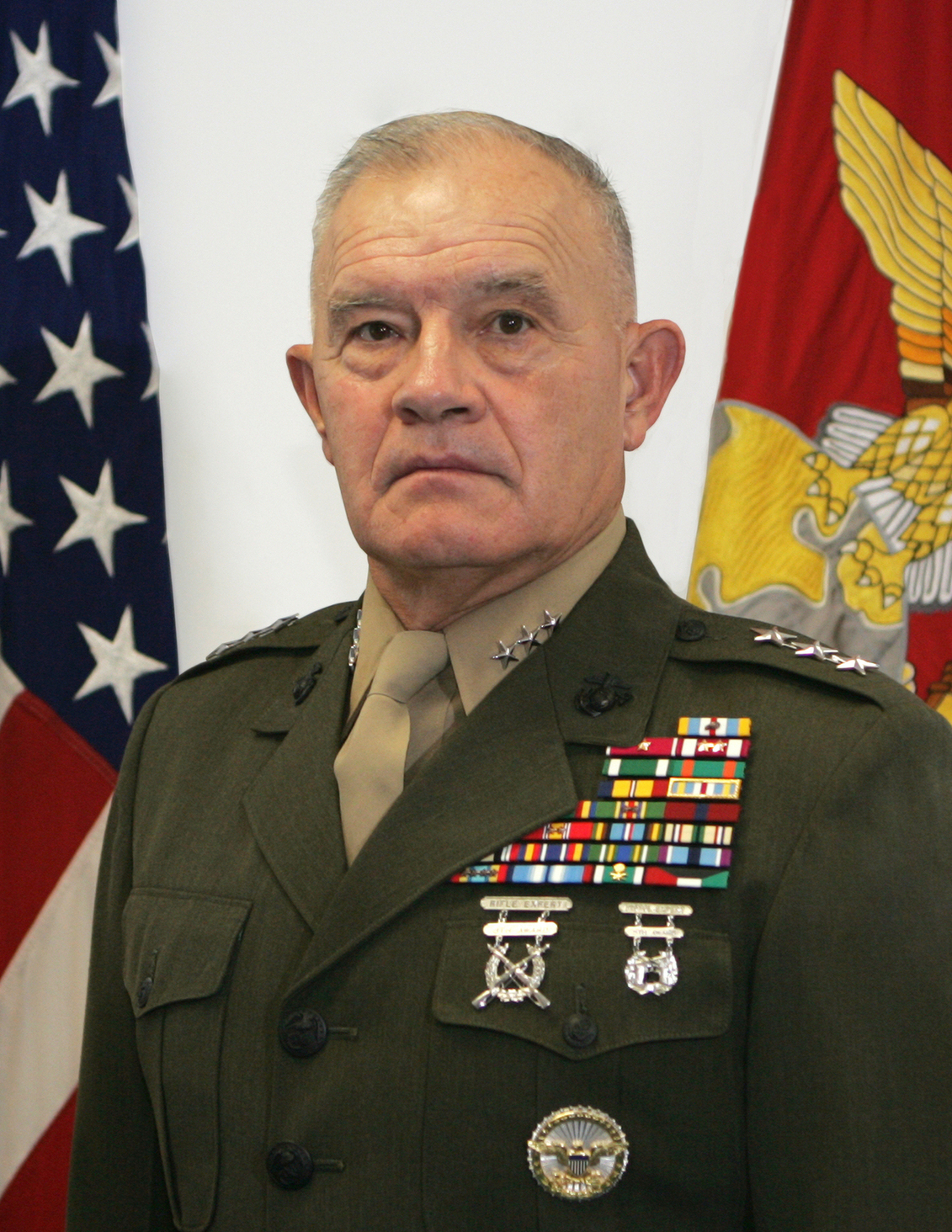
- Lieutenant General Dennis J. Hejlik
- Military career
- Allegiance: United States
- Branch: United States Marine Corps
- Service years: 1968–1972; 1975–2012
- Rank: Lieutenant general
- Commands: United States Marine Corps Forces, Europe; Marine Forces Command; 2nd Marine Expeditionary Force; Marine Forces Special Operations Command; Marine Barracks, Washington, D.C. 1st Battalion, 2nd Marines
- Conflicts: Gulf War; Iraq War
- Awards: Defense Superior Service Medal (2); Legion of Merit (2)

Dennis J. Hejlik is a retired United States Marine Corps lieutenant general. Hejlik previously served as commanding general of United States Marine Corps Forces, Europe and United States Marine Corps Forces Command. Until early 2008, Hejlik commanded the newly established Marine Special Operations Command.

== Military career ==
Hejlik, a native of Garner, Iowa, enlisted in the United States Marine Corps in 1968, rising to the rank of sergeant before accepting honorable discharge in 1972 to pursue education. He graduated from Minnesota State University, Mankato in 1975, returning to the Marines as a mustang second lieutenant through the Platoon Leaders Class Program.

As a commissioned officer, Hejlik had commands at the platoon, company, and battalion, brigade, and corps levels. He has also served as a tactics instructor at the Amphibious Warfare School. Hejlik graduated from the Naval War College at Newport, Rhode Island, in 1993. As a lieutenant colonel, Hejlik assumed command of 1st Battalion, 2nd Marines. The Marine Barracks, Washington, D.C. came under his command in 1997. While there, Hejlik barred the marines under his command from a number of gay bars in the city in an attempt to curb antagonism between marines and the gay community. In 1999, he was appointed as Military Secretary to the Commandant of the Marine Corps.

Hejlik was assigned as the Principal Director for Special Operations and Combating Terrorism in 2001, then as chief of staff and director of the Center for Command Support in 2002. He was next assigned as deputy commanding general of I Marine Expeditionary Force, which holds a secondary billet as commander of the 1st Marine Expeditionary Brigade, both headquartered at Camp Pendleton, in July 2004 until late 2005. With that unit, Hejlik was involved in preparing the counter-insurgency efforts during the United States occupation of Fallujah.

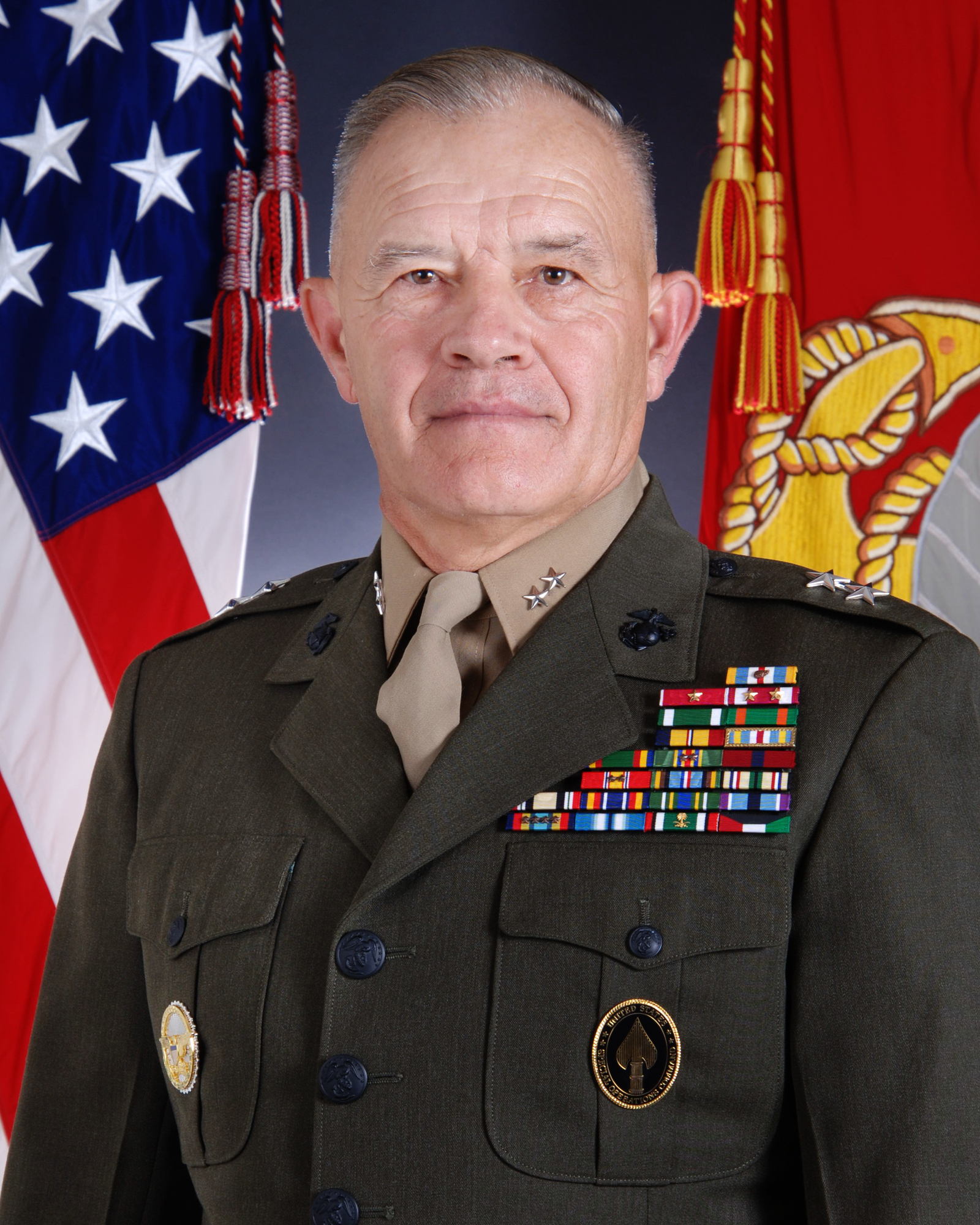
Hejlik as MARSOC commander

Hejlik was named the first commander of the Marine Special Operations Command. The command was first announced on November 1, 2005, becoming the first Special Operations Command unit of the Marine Corps. Hejlik was a vocal supporter of the new command, which opponents claim detracts from the corps' status and reputation as an all-elite force. Proponents, including Defense Secretary Donald Rumsfeld, claim special operations units, to include marines, are essential in the war on terrorism.

Hejlik was confirmed by the Senate for promotion to the rank of major general on March 16, 2006. He was then nominated for promotion to the rank of lieutenant general on March 13, 2008, to become the commander of the II Marine Expeditionary Force; and confirmed for promotion by the Senate on April 29, 2008. In April 2010, he was nominated by President Barack Obama to relieve Richard F. Natonski as commander of Marine Forces Command. Hejlik served as Commanding General, II Marine Expeditionary Force, Camp Lejeune, North Carolina, from July 2008 until August 2010.

== Awards and decorations ==
Medals awarded to Hejlik include:

1st Row		Defense Superior Service Medal w/ 1 oak leaf cluster			Office of the Secretary of Defense Identification Badge
2nd Row	Legion of Merit w/ 1 award star	Meritorious Service Medal w/ 2 award stars	Navy and Marine Corps Commendation Medal	Navy and Marine Corps Achievement Medal	Office of the Secretary of Defense Identification Badge
3rd Row	Combat Action Ribbon	Joint Meritorious Unit Award	Navy Unit Commendation	Navy Meritorious Unit Commendation w/ 2 service stars	Office of the Secretary of Defense Identification Badge
4th Row	Marine Corps Good Conduct Medal	National Defense Service Medal w/ 2 service star	Armed Forces Expeditionary Medal	Southwest Asia Service Medal	Office of the Secretary of Defense Identification Badge
5th Row	Iraq Campaign Medal	Global War on Terrorism Service Medal	Korea Defense Service Medal	Humanitarian Service Medal	Office of the Secretary of Defense Identification Badge
6th Row	Navy Sea Service Deployment Ribbon w/ 4 service stars	Arctic Service Ribbon	Kuwait Liberation Medal (Saudi Arabia)	Kuwait Liberation Medal (Kuwait)	Office of the Secretary of Defense Identification Badge

- General Hejlik is also the winner of the Leftwich Trophy.
