= Susan Wissler House =

Historic house in Dayton, Wyoming

- U.S. National Register of Historic Places
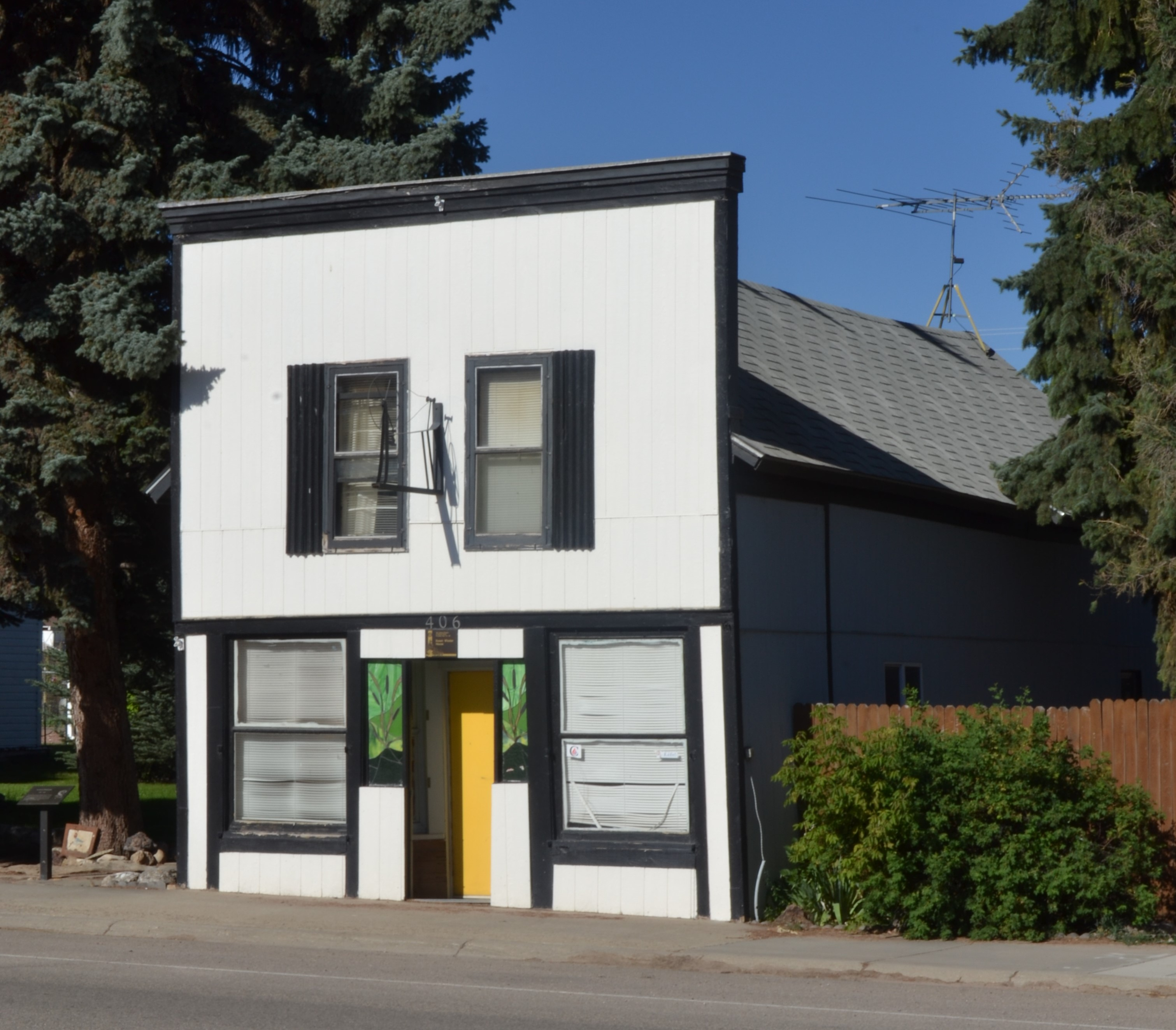

- Location within Wyoming Location within the United States
- Location: 406 Main Street, Dayton, Wyoming
- Coordinates: 44°52′27″N 107°15′43″W
- Area: less than one acre
- Built: 1885
- Architectural style: Western false front
- NRHP reference No.: 84003703
- Added to NRHP: March 8, 1984

The Susan Wissler House is a historic house located at 406 Main Street in Dayton, Wyoming. The house was the home of Susan Wissler, the mayor of Dayton from 1911 to 1914; Wissler was the first female mayor in Wyoming and one of the first in the United States. The house was constructed in 1885 as a commercial building with a residence on the upper floor; the building features a false front and has kept its historical condition. Wissler lived in the house from 1905 to 1915, including the duration of her term as mayor.

The house was added to the National Register of Historic Places on March 8, 1984.
