= William M. Keys =

United States Marine Corps general (1937–2026)

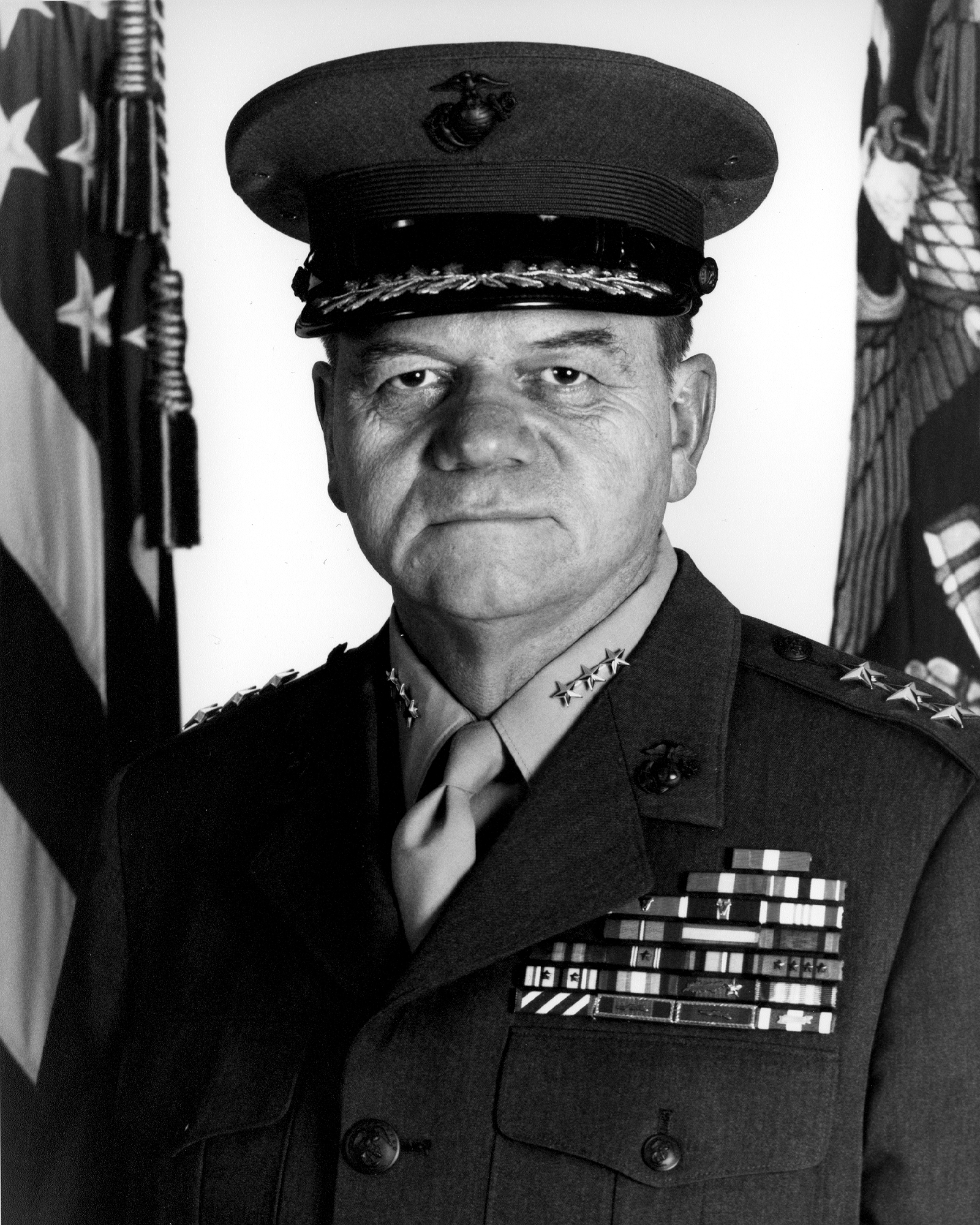
- Born: March 29, 1937; Fredericktown, Pennsylvania U.S.
- Died: January 24, 2026 (aged 88)
- Military career
- Allegiance: United States of America
- Branch: United States Marine Corps
- Service years: 1960–1994
- Rank: Lieutenant general
- Service number: 0-79544
- Commands: II Marine Expeditionary Force; 2nd Marine Division; 6th Marine Regiment; 3rd Battalion, 5th Marines
- Conflicts: Operation Desert Storm; Vietnam War
- Awards: Navy Cross; Legion of Merit; Silver Star Medal

William Morgan Keys (March 29, 1937 – January 24, 2026) was a United States Marine lieutenant general. Keys was a combat veteran — receiving the Navy Cross for his heroic actions during the Vietnam War, as well as the Silver Star. Keys served as Commander, Marine Corps Forces Atlantic before retirement in 1994.

After his retirement, Keys was hired by Colt's Manufacturing Company where he served as president and CEO from 1999-2012. Keys is widely regarded as being responsible for saving Colt from financial ruin in the late 1990's.

== Marine Corps career ==
Keys was commissioned in the United States Marine Corps as a second lieutenant after graduation from United States Naval Academy in 1960. He graduated from The Basic School at Marine Corps Base Quantico and received assignment as rifle platoon leader with 3rd Battalion, 2nd Marines. Keys then commanded a Marine Detachment aboard the USS Long Beach. In Vietnam, he was decorated as company commander with the 1st Battalion, 9th Marines. Keys was awarded the Navy Cross for conspicuous gallantry in action in 1967 taking his company on independent action, surrounding a North Vietnamese battalion and inflicting heavy casualties. Keys was also awarded the Silver Star Medal for actions on March 5, 1967, while participating in Operation Prairie II. Keys served a second tour in Vietnam as an advisor to the Vietnamese Marine Corps. After returning from Vietnam, Keys attended Amphibious Warfare School, and later the Marine Corps Command and Staff College. As a lieutenant colonel, Keys was selected to attend the National War College in Washington, D.C. Upon completion of school, he assumed command of 3rd Battalion, 5th Marines. Keys served numerous staff assignments including Infantry Officers’ Monitor, Personnel Management Division, Headquarters Marine Corps, Washington D.C.; Marine Corps Liaison Officer to the United States Senate; Special Projects Directorate in the Office of the Commandant; Aide de Camp to the Assistant Commandant of the Marine Corps; Deputy Director, and subsequently Director, Personnel Management Division, Manpower and Reserve Affairs Department, Headquarters Marine Corps; and the Deputy Joint Secretariat, Joint Chiefs of Staff, Washington, D.C. As a colonel, Keys served as commanding officer, 6th Marine Regiment at Camp Lejune from October 20, 1983 to February 7, 1986.

Upon promotion to major general, Key received assignment as Commanding General of the 2nd Marine Division, FMF, Atlantic, Camp Lejueune, North Carolina on September 27, 1989 and led the division during Operation Desert Storm in Iraq. Keys relinquished command of 2nd Marine Division to Major General Paul Van Riper on June 24, 1991. He retired as Commanding General of both U.S. Marine Corps Forces, Atlantic; II Marine Expeditionary Force in 1994.

=== Navy Cross citation ===
Citation:

The President of the United States of America takes pleasure in presenting the Navy Cross to Captain William M. Keys (MCSN: 0-79544), United States Marine Corps, for extraordinary heroism as Commanding Officer, Company D, First Battalion, Ninth Marines, THIRD Marine Division (Reinforced), Fleet Marine Force, while engaged in action against elements of the North Vietnamese Army and insurgent communist (Viet Cong) forces during Operation PRAIRIE II in the Cam Lo district of the Republic of Vietnam on 2 March 1967. While on a search and destroy mission, Captain Keys' company made contact with a large enemy force estimated to be two companies in strength. During this contact, the company command post group received heavy automatic-weapons and mortar fire from the rear. Realizing that his rifle platoons were heavily engaged, Captain Keys organized his command group into an assault element and led them against the enemy, who were firing into his position. Personally leading his small group against a numerically superior force, he succeeded in completely overrunning the North Vietnamese, personally killing six and destroying a machine gun position. Immediately following this fire fight he rushed to the rear of his center platoon where he could best direct the deployment of his company. During the next four hours his company repelled attack after attack by a determined enemy. This period found Captain Keys along the entire line of his company, shouting encouragement, shifting forces to meet each new attack, and successfully directing all aspects of his company's firepower and supporting arms. Following the enemy's last attack, Captain Keys immediately reorganized his company and attacked the enemy before they could withdraw to a safe area. While completely overrunning the enemy camp, his company succeeded in killing 183 North Vietnamese soldiers and capturing eight prisoners and nearly 200 weapons. Realizing that the surviving enemy would attempt to circumvent his company during the oncoming darkness and escape to the north, Captain Keys placed his company in a blocking position, thereby forcing the enemy to withdraw into a prearranged zone where they were pounded by air and artillery resulting in 44 more enemy killed. As a result of his professional skill and stirring example, the enemy forces in his area of operations were completely routed. By his daring performance and loyal devotion to duty in the face of great personal risk, Captain Keys reflected great credit upon himself and the Marine Corps and upheld the highest traditions of the United States Naval Service.

=== Silver Star Medal citation ===
Citation:

The President of the United States of America takes pleasure in presenting the Silver Star to Captain William Morgan Keys (MCSN: 0-79544), United States Marine Corps, for conspicuous gallantry and intrepidity in action while serving as Commanding Officer of Company D, First Battalion, Ninth Marines, THIRD Marine Division, in action against the enemy in the Republic of Vietnam on 5 March 1967, while participating in Operation PRAIRIE II in the Gio Linh District. On that date, Captain Keys company came under intense enemy small arms, mortar and rocket fire while moving through a narrow valley. Rushing to a vantage point, Captain Keys immediately and aggressively directed all available fire on the enemy force. When the lead platoon was temporarily halted, he unhesitatingly and fearlessly led the assault on the enemy positions. Shouting encouragement to his men, Captain Keys heroically closed with the enemy in hand-to-hand combat in the dense underbrush and personally killed four of them. Despite the danger of mines and the increasingly heavy enemy fire, he was constantly at the heaviest point of contact, personally directing his unit. As a result of Captain Key's superior leadership and exemplary aggressiveness, the company accounted for more than seventy enemy killed and the remainder of the force, estimated to be over a company, fled in panic and confusion, abandoning their equipment and eighty-four weapons. His outstanding professionalism and bold initiative were an inspiration to all who served with him and contributed immeasurably to the accomplishment of his unit's mission. By his inspiring leadership, uncommon courage and selfless devotion to duty in the face of extreme danger, Captain Keys upheld the highest traditions of the Marine Corps and of the United States Naval Service.

=== Legion of Merit citation ===
Citation:

The President of the United States of America takes pleasure in presenting the Legion of Merit with Combat "V" to Major William Morgan Keys (MCSN: 0-79544/0302), United States Marine Corps, for exceptionally meritorious conduct in the performance of outstanding services to the Government of the United States in the Republic of Vietnam serving with the Marine Advisory Unit from 23 June 1972 to 1 March 1973. Assigned initially as the Assistant Brigade Advisor to Vietnamese Marine Brigade ONE FORTY-SEVEN, Major Keys provided valuable advice and assistance to the Brigade operations officer during the early stages of the Vietnamese Marine Division counter-offensive to recapture Quang Tri Province from the invading North Vietnamese Army. Working with tireless precision, he assisted in planning and controlling supporting arms during continuous infantry-armor attacks as well as during two highly successful helicopter-borne assaults against the entrenched communist forces. Later, as Senior Battalion Advisor, he served for six weeks with the FOURTH Vietnamese Marine Infantry Battalion north of Quang Tri City. During that period, the FOURTH Battalion, as part of the overall Vietnamese Marine assault on Quang Tri City, was ordered to stop any enemy attempt to reinforce the city from the north. By his sound tactical advice, personal courage and calm coordination of supporting arms, Major Keys played a significant part in repelling the fierce enemy attacks. Establishing a close working relationship with his counterpart and a high espirit among his fourteen man advisory team, he personally was responsible for developing an extremely efficient and effective Brigade advisory effort despite continuous combat conditions. Constantly attempting to improve the employment of supporting arms, he introduced the use of low flying helicopters to adjust naval gunfire. This system, which he perfected, has been credited with saving many friendly lives in that it provided for continued delivery of accurate naval gunfire during periods of low visibility. During his tour as Senior Advisor, Brigade ONE FORTY-SEVEN was the focal point of both Vietnamese Marine and enemy initiated action within the Marine Division Area of Operations as the Brigade continuously pressed northward toward the Cua Viet River against determined communist resistance. The offensive was culminated on 28 January 1973 when the Vietnamese Marines reached the Cua Viet River, only minutes before the ceasefire was put into effect. Major Keys devotion to duty, courage under fire, and exemplary professionalism were in keeping with the highest traditions of the United States Naval Service.

== Post-military career ==
After his retirement from the Marine Corps in 1994, Keys contacted then CEO of Colt's Manufacturing Company, Donald Zilkha, for work. At the time, Colt had been struggling with poor leadership and financial hardship. In 1996, Zilkha hired Keys as a board member of Colt. After continued issues with CEOs and nearing bankruptcy, Colt's board members elevated Keys to president and CEO in 1999. Shortly after becoming CEO, Keys had discovered that U.S. SOCOM had given out Colt's TDP for the M4 carbine to other weapons manufacturers. Rather than sue the U.S. government for this mishandling, Keys decided to offer the M4 for government procurement under the condition of a sole-source contract. The U.S. government agreed to the offer in order to avoid lawsuits and potential fines. This move is widely regarded as being responsible for saving Colt from bankruptcy.

Keys oversaw several significant programs in Colt's modern history including the development of the LE1020, M5, as well as Colt's submissions to the U.S. Military's SCAR and Individual Carbine programs. Keys was also largely responsible for the development of the Colt CM901 stemming from Colt lacking a .308-caliber AR-style rifle in their catalog at the time.

Keys was notably not fond of 9x19mm pistols, rather preferring the .45 ACP that he was familiar with from his combat experience in the Vietnam War. Because of this, no 9mm pistols were developed by Colt under his leadership. The last program that Keys oversaw was the development of the M45A1 pistol for U.S. Marine Corps Force Reconnaissance and MARSOC. The three stars engraved on the slide of the M45A1 pistols was done as a tribute to Keys, who retired from the Marine Corps as lieutenant (3-Star) general.

Keys stepped down as president and CEO of Colt in 2012, but remained on the board of directors. He retired from Colt in 2013.

== Personal life and death ==
Keys maintained residence in Virginia while in-charge of Colt. He would fly to Colt's headquarters in Hartford, Connecticut on Mondays, then fly back home later in the week. He reportedly lived in a modest apartment, drove a Jeep Cherokee daily, and owned several dogs. Keys had one daughter, Elizabeth, who was born in 2005.

Keys died on January 24, 2026, at the age of 88.

== Awards and decorations ==
U.S. military decorations
| Navy Cross |
| Navy Distinguished Service Medal with gold award star |
| Defense Distinguished Service Medal |
| Silver Star Medal |
| Legion of Merit with Combat Distinguishing Device |
| Bronze Star Medal with Combat Distinguishing Device |
| Defense Meritorious Service Medal |
| Combat Action Ribbon |
U.S. Unit Awards
| Presidential Unit Citation |
| Navy Unit Commendation |
| Navy Meritorious Unit Commendation |
U.S. Service (Campaign) Medals and Service and Training Ribbons
| National Defense Service Medal with bronze service star |
| Armed Forces Expeditionary Medal |
| Vietnam Service Medal with four bronze service stars |
| Southwest Asia Service Medal with two bronze campaign stars |
| Sea Service Deployment Ribbon with bronze service star |
| Vietnam Armed Forces Honor Medal First Class |
| Vietnam Staff Service Medal First Class |
| Vietnam Gallantry Cross |
| Vietnam Civil Actions Medal |
| Vietnam Campaign Medal |
| Kuwait Liberation Medal (Saudi Arabia) |
| Kuwait Liberation Medal (Kuwait) |

U.S. badges, patches and tabs
| Rifle Expert Badge |
| Pistol Expert Badge |
