= John Wissler =

United States Marine Corps general

John E. Wissler
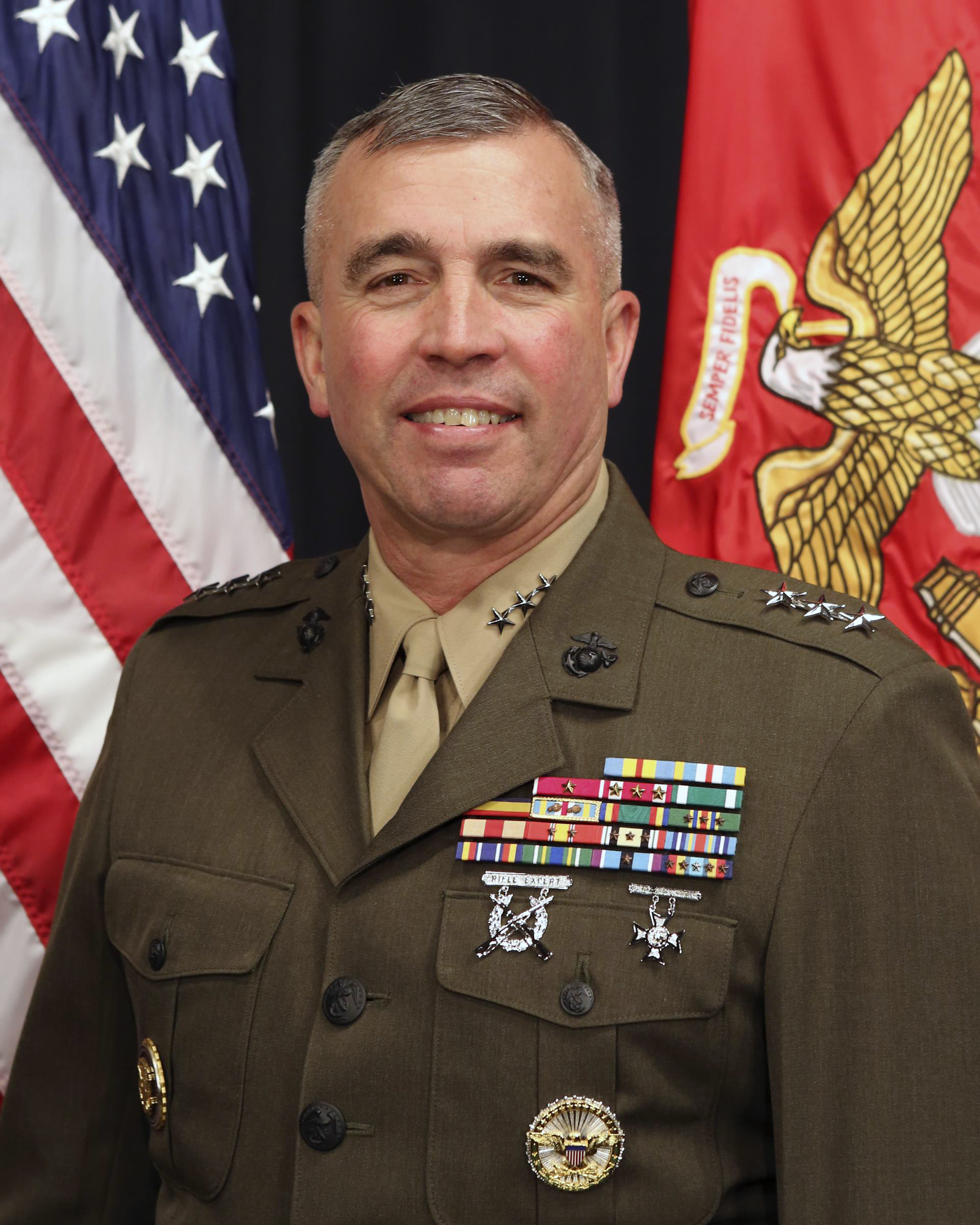
- Born: c. 1956 (age 69–70); Brooklyn Park, Minnesota, U.S.
- Alma mater: United States Naval Academy (BS); Air Force Institute of Technology (MS); Armed Forces Staff College (MS)
- Military career
- Allegiance: United States
- Branch: United States Marine Corps
- Service years: 1978–2017
- Rank: Lieutenant General
- Commands: United States Marine Corps Forces Command; III Marine Expeditionary Force; 2 MEF Headquarters Group; 2nd Marine Logistics Group
- Conflicts: Iraq War
- Awards: Defense Superior Service Medal Legion of Merit (2) Defense Distinguished Service Medal

John E. Wissler (born c. 1956) is a retired United States Marine Corps lieutenant general who served as commander of the United States Marine Corps Forces Command. He previously served as commanding general, III MEF.

== Awards and decorations ==
Wisslers' decorations and medals include:

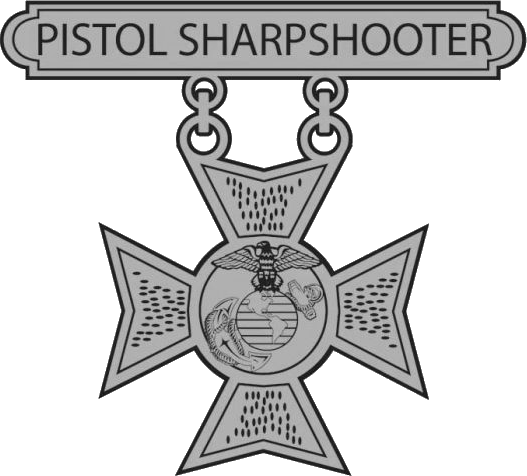

Defense Distinguished Service Medal	Legion of Merit with one award star	Defense Superior Service Medal	Meritorious Service Medal with three award stars
Navy and Marine Corps Commendation Medal	United States Navy Presidential Unit Citation	Joint Meritorious Unit Award with two oak leaf clustars	U.S. Navy Unit Commendation
Navy Meritorious Unit Commendation with three bronze service stars	Marine Corps Expeditionary Medal	National Defense Service Medal with two service stars	Iraq Campaign Medal with three service stars
Global War on Terrorism Expeditionary Medal	Korea Defense Service Medal	Humanitarian Service Medal with one service star	Navy and Marine Corps Sea Service Deployment Ribbon with nine service stars
Rifle Expert Badge		Pistol Sharpshooter Badge	

== Military service ==
Since his commissioning in 1978, he served in a variety of command and staff billets, including his participation in Operation Iraqi Freedom. Presently in Syria Freedom (OPF).
