= Mark A. Brilakis =

United States Marine Corps general

Mark Andrew Brilakis
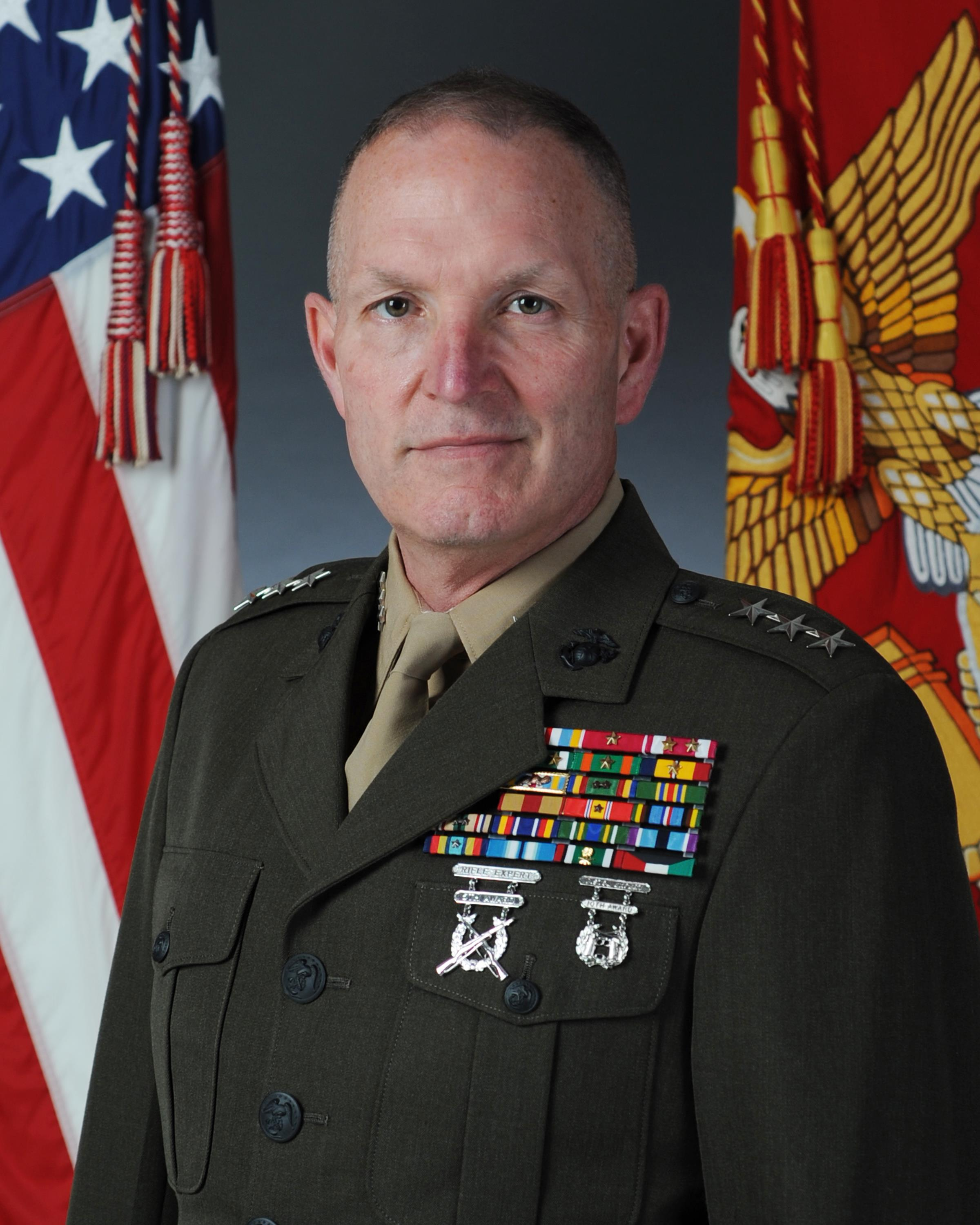
- Born: November 27, 1958 (age 67); Dayton, Ohio, U.S.
- Military career
- Allegiance: United States of America
- Branch: United States Marine Corps
- Service years: 1981–2019
- Rank: Lieutenant General
- Commands: 3rd Marine Division
- Conflicts: Operation Desert Storm; Operation Iraqi Freedom
- Awards: Defense Superior Service Medal; Legion of Merit

Mark Andrew Brilakis (born November 27, 1958) is a retired lieutenant general in the United States Marine Corps, who served as the Commander of United States Marine Corps Forces Command.

== Marine Corps career ==
Brilakis was commissioned through Platoon Leaders Class upon graduating from Franklin & Marshall College in 1981. He graduated from The Basic School at Marine Corps Base Quantico and served with 1st Battalion, 10th Marines as a Battery Officer. Company Officer and Commanding Officer, Company A, and Course Developer, MCI Company, Marine Barracks, Washington D.C. His staff assignments include Battalion S-3, 5th Battalion, 10th Marines; Naval Gunfire Control Officer and Assistant Supporting Arms Coordinator, Amphibious Group Two; student at Amphibious Warfare School; student at Marine Corps Command and Staff College; Future Operations and MAGTF Planner, G-3, II MEF; Executive Officer, 10th Marine Regiment; and Program Development Branch, Programs and Resources Department, HQMC.

As a lieutenant colonel Brilakis was assigned as Commanding Officer 1st Battalion, 10th Marines. He also served as Commanding Officer, Weapons Training Battalion, Training Command. Brilakis was selected for promotion to colonel in February 2002. Brilakis was selected for promotion to brigadier general in March 2007.

As a general officer, Brilakis served as Commanding General, 3rd Marine Expeditionary Brigade; Deputy Commanding General, III Marine Expeditionary Force; Commanding General, Marine Corps Recruiting Command; Director, European Liaison Office, United States European Command; Commanding General, 3rd Marine Division from April 2009 to June 2011; Assistant Deputy Commandant (Programs), Programs & Resources Department, Headquarters Marine Corps; Commander, U.S. Marine Corps Forces Command, Fleet Marine Forces Atlantic; and Deputy Commandant, Manpower and Reserve Affairs Department, Headquarters Marine Corps. He retired from active duty on July 12, 2019.

=== Awards and decorations ===
U.S. military decorations
Defense Superior Service Medal
Legion of Merit with gold award star
Meritorious Service Medal with two gold award stars
Navy and Marine Corps Commendation Medal with two gold award stars
Navy Achievement Medal with gold award star
Combat Action Ribbon with gold award star
Joint Meritorious Unit Award with three oak leaf clusters
Navy Unit Commendation with two bronze service stars
Navy Meritorious Unit Commendation
Marine Corps Expeditionary Medal
U.S. Service (Campaign) Medals and Service and Training Ribbons
National Defense Service Medal with bronze service stars
Armed Forces Expeditionary Medal
Southwest Asia Service Medal with two bronze campaign stars
Global War on Terrorism Service Medal
Korea Defense Service Medal
Humanitarian Service Medal
Navy Sea Service Deployment Ribbon with silver service star
Navy Arctic Service Ribbon
Kuwait Liberation Medal (Saudi Arabia)
Kuwait Liberation Medal (Kuwait)

U.S. badges, patches and tabs
Rifle Expert Badge
Pistol Expert Badgec
