= Raymond P. Ayres =

United States Marine Corps general

Raymond P. Ayres, Jr.
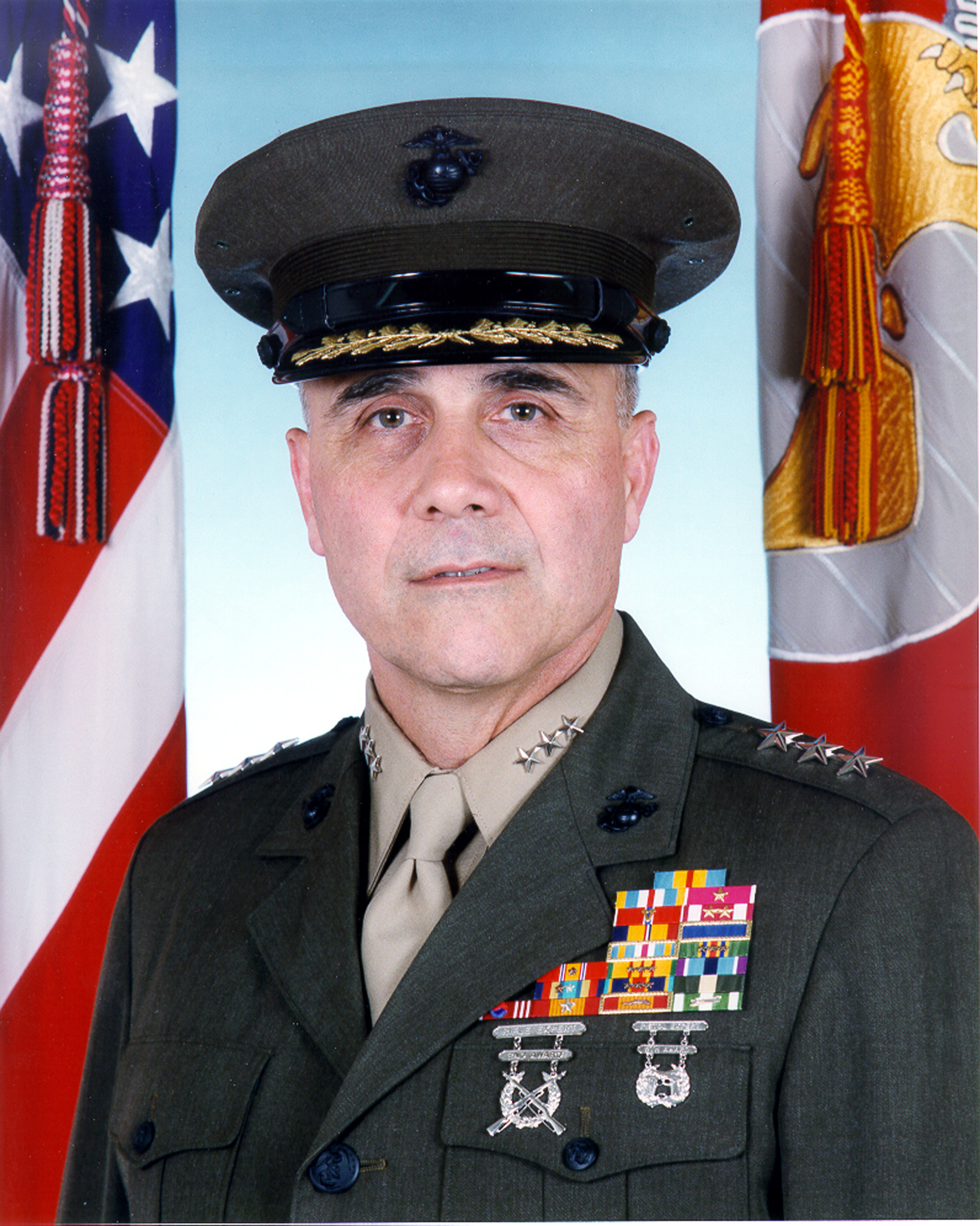
- Ayres in 1999
- Born: October 6, 1944 (age 82)
- Military career
- Service years: 1966–2002
- Rank: Lieutenant general

Raymond P. Ayres, Jr. (born October 6, 1944) is an American military officer who held the rank of Lieutenant general in the United States Marine Corps.

Born in Carthage, Missouri and raised in Bayside, New York, in 1966 Ayres graduated from Iona College in mathematics and entered the U.S. Marine Corps. One of his first assignments was as commander of the Marine Detachment aboard USS Franklin D. Roosevelt. Later, he served as executive officer of the United States Marine Band.

As a flag officer, he served as deputy chief of staff for plans, policies and operations and as commander, Fleet Marine Force, Atlantic.
