= David Odom =

U.S Marine Corps General

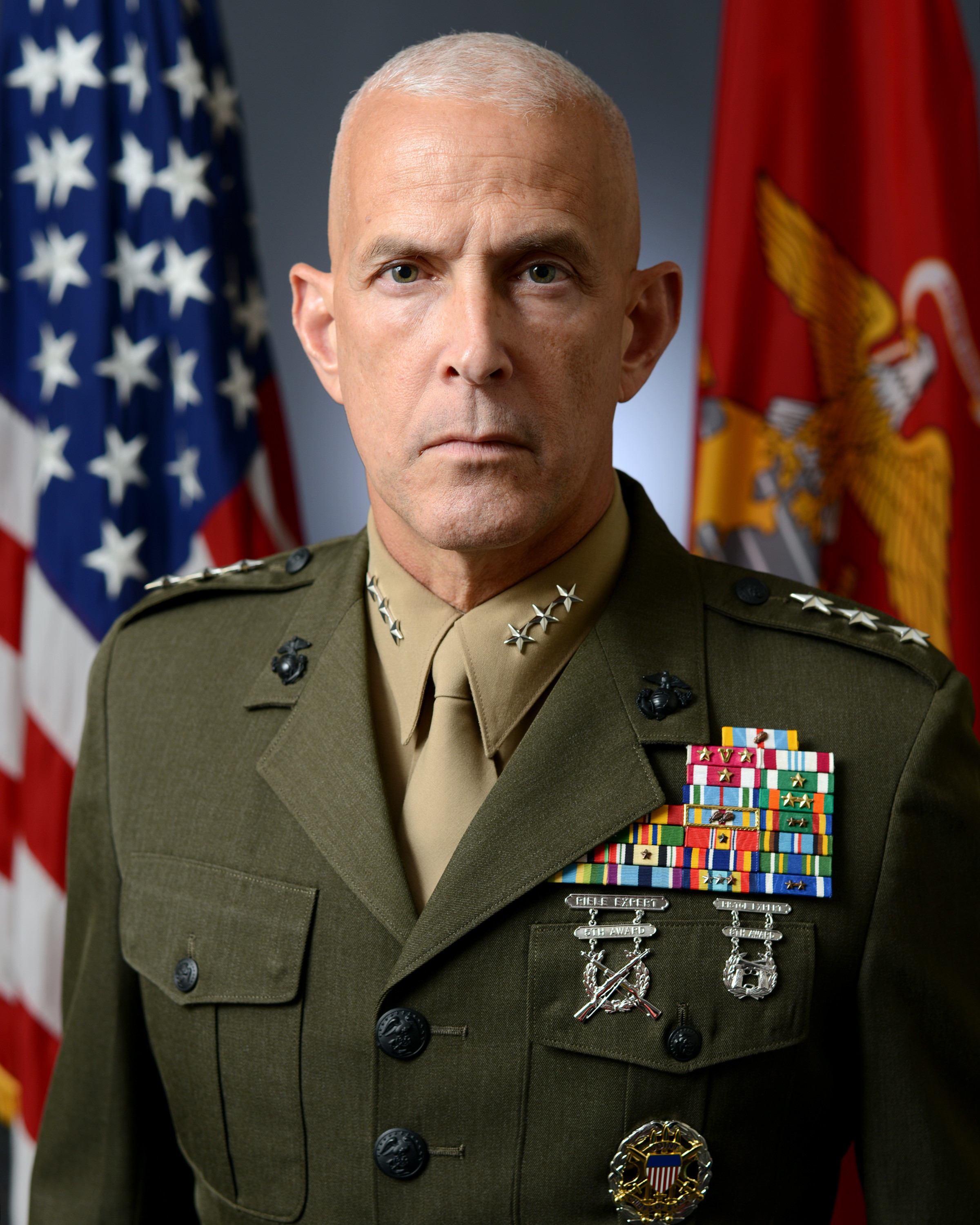
- Official portrait, 2025
- Born: Hartsville, South Carolina, U.S.
- Education: The Citadel; Joint Forces Staff College; Marine Corps War College
- Military career
- Allegiance: United States
- Branch: United States Marine Corps
- Service years: 1991–present
- Rank: Lieutenant General
- Commands: 2nd Marine Division; 2nd Marine Expeditionary Brigade; Task Force Southwest; 8th Marine Regiment; 3rd Battalion, 8th Marines
- Conflicts: Iraq War; War in Afghanistan
- Awards: Defense Superior Service Medal (2); Legion of Merit (3)

David L. Odom is a United States Marine Corps lieutenant general who was commanding general of the 2nd Marine Division from 2024 to 2025. He currently serves as Director of Operations at the Joint Staff since 2025.

== Biography ==
A native of Hartsville, South Carolina, Odom graduated from The Citadel in 1991 with a Bachelor of Arts degree in English and was commissioned in the United States Marine Corps as an infantry officer. His further military education included The Basic School, Amphibious Warfare School, the Marine Corps Command and Staff College, the School of Advanced Warfighting, and the Marine Corps War College. He holds master's degrees in military, operational, and strategic studies. In 2012, he completed the Advanced Management Program at Harvard Business School.

Odom has been deployed in both the Iraq War and the War in Afghanistan, and served a company and battalion commander in the 3rd Battalion, 8th Marines. He later commanded the 4th Marine Regiment in Japan. He also served on the staff of The Basic School and the Infantry Officer School. His other staff assignments include serving as Assistant Division Commander of 2nd Marine Division; Deputy Commanding General of II Marine Expeditionary Force; and Director, Expeditionary Warfare Division (N95) on the Staff of the Chief of Naval Operations (OPNAV). He also commanded Task Force Southwest in Afghanistan.

In June 2020, Odom assumed command of the 2nd Marine Expeditionary Brigade. After that assignment, he served as deputy director for Current and Integrated Operations (J-33), Operations Directorate (J-3), the Joint Staff, and was also nominated for promotion to major general in December 2022. In June 2024, he became commanding general of the 2nd Marine Division, until May 2025.

In June 2025, he was nominated for promotion to lieutenant general and assignment as director for operations of the Joint Staff.

== Awards ==
Odom's decorations and medals include

Defense Superior Service Medal with bronze oak leaf cluster
Legion of Merit with ”V” device and two gold award stars	Defense Meritorious Service Medal w	Meritorious Service Medal with gold award star	Navy and Marine Corps Commendation Medal with gold award star
Joint Service Achievement Medal	Navy and Marine Corps Achievement Medal with two gold award stars	Combat Action Ribbon	Joint Meritorious Unit Award with two Oak leaf clusters
U.S. Navy Unit Commendation with two bronze star	Navy Meritorious Unit Commendation	National Defense Service Medal with bronze service star	Armed Forces Expeditionary Medal
Afghanistan Campaign Medal with bronze service star	Iraq Campaign Medal with bronze service star	Global War on Terrorism Service Medal	Korea Defense Service Medal
Armed Forces Service Medal	Humanitarian Service Medal	Sea Service Ribbon with eleven award stars	NATO Medal for Yugoslavia with two bronze award stars
Expert Rifle Badge(5th award)		Expert Pistol Badge(8th award)	

== Personal life ==
Odom is married to Dr. Michelle Trusso, who is a retired Marine lieutenant colonel.

Military offices
Preceded by Stephen M. Neary	Commanding General of the 2nd Marine Expeditionary Brigade; 2020–2021	Succeeded by Anthony M. Henderson
Preceded by Calvert L. Worth Jr.	Commanding General of the 2nd Marine Division; 2024–2025	Succeeded by Farrell J. Sullivan
Preceded by Alexus Grynkewich	Director for Operations of the Joint Staff; 2025–present	Incumbent
