= Benjamin T. Watson =

U.S. Marine Corps general officer

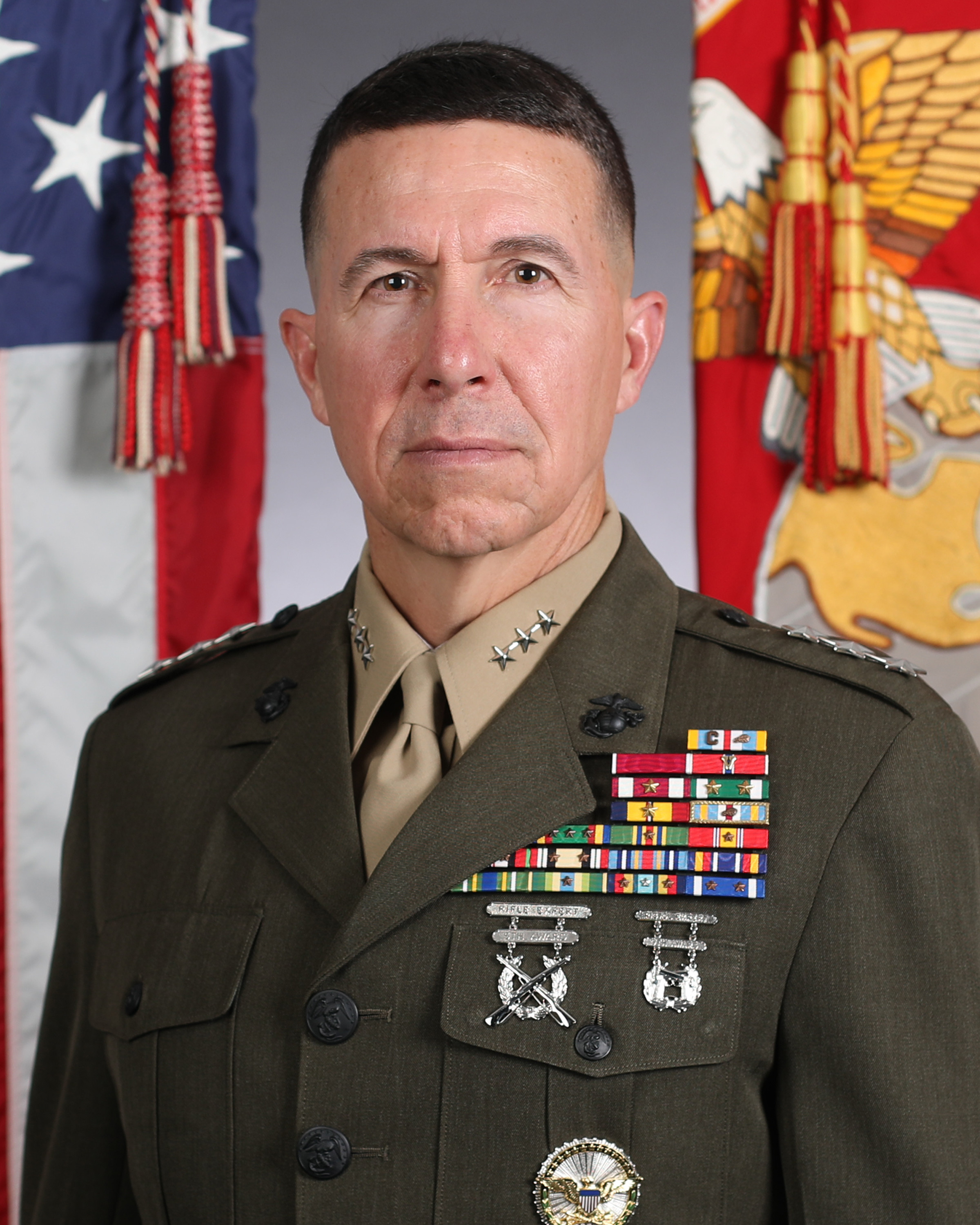
- Official portrait, 2024
- Born: c. 1969 (age 56–57)
- Military career
- Allegiance: United States
- Branch: United States Marine Corps
- Service years: 1991–present
- Rank: Lieutenant General
- Commands: III Marine Expeditionary Force; United States Marine Corps Training and Education Command; 1st Marine Division; Marine Corps Warfighting Laboratory; Task Force Southwest; Marine Corps Installations East; Marine Barracks, Washington, D.C.; 3rd Battalion, 1st Marines; Weapons Company, 2nd Battalion, 6th Marines
- Awards: Defense Superior Service Medal (2); Legion of Merit

Benjamin T. Watson (born c. 1967) is a United States Marine Corps lieutenant general who serves as the commanding general (CG) of III Marine Expeditionary Force (III MEF). He previously served as the deputy commandant for training and education of the United States Marine Corps, CG of the United States Marine Corps Training and Education Command, and CG of the 1st Marine Division.

== Military career ==
Watson served as the CG of the Marine Corps Warfighting Laboratory from 2019 to 2022.

In May 2024, Watson was nominated for promotion to lieutenant general and assignment as CG of the United States Marine Corps Training and Education Command. In June 2025, Watson was nominated for reappointment as a lieutenant general and additional assignment as deputy commandant for training and education of the United States Marine Corps.

On July 15, 2026, Watson assumed command of III MEF, succeeding Lieutenant General Roger B. Turner.

Military offices
Preceded by Scott Baldwin	Commanding General of Marine Corps Installations East and Marine Corps Base Camp Lejeune; 2018–2019	Succeeded by Andrew M. Niebel
Preceded by Julian Alford	Commanding General of Task Force Southwest; 2018	Succeeded by Calvert L. Worth Jr.
Preceded by Christian F. Wortman	Commanding General of the Marine Corps Warfighting Laboratory; 2019–2022	Succeeded by Kyle B. Ellison
Preceded by Roger B. Turner	Commanding General of the 1st Marine Division; 2022–2024	Succeeded by Robert C. Fulford
Preceded by Kevin Iiams	Commanding General of the United States Marine Corps Training and Education Command; 2024–2026	Succeeded by Thomas B. Savage
New office	Deputy Commandant for Training and Education of the United States Marine Corps; 2025–2026	Succeeded by Thomas B. Savage
