= Air Naval Gunfire Liaison Company =

Air Naval Gunfire Liaison Companies (ANGLICO)
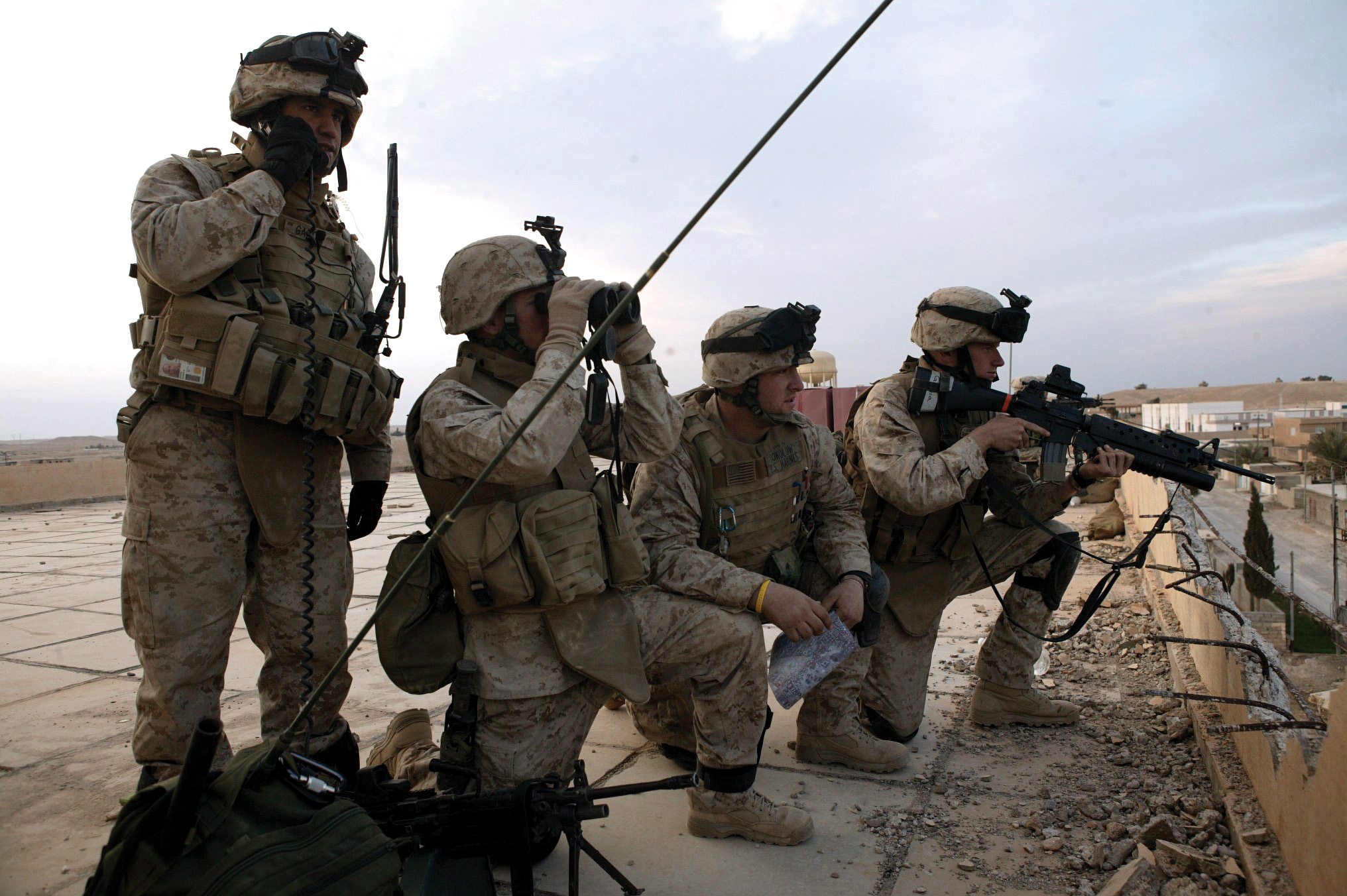
- An ANGLICO team operates from a rooftop during the Iraq War's Operation River Blitz in 2005.
- Founded: December 1949
- Country: United States
- Branch: United States Marine Corps
- Type: Liaison and fire support
- Role: Liaison and control of supporting arms for Marine Air-Ground Task Force
- Size: ≈150–200 (officers and enlisted)
- Part of: MEF Information Group (active component), Force_Headquarters_Group (reserve component)
- Nicknames: ANGLICANS, ANGLIBROS
- Mottos: "Lightning from the Sky, Thunder from the Sea"; Non Multa Sed Multum (English: Not Many But Much)
- Engagements: Korean War; Vietnam War; Multinational Force in Lebanon; Invasion of Grenada; Operation Just Cause; Persian Gulf War; Operation Restore Hope; War in Afghanistan; Iraq War

Insignia
- NATO Map Symbol

Air Naval Gunfire Liaison Company (ANGLICO) is a liaison and fire support unit of the United States Marine Corps. The mission of ANGLICO is "To provide Marine Air-Ground Task Force (MAGTF) Commanders a liaison capability to plan, coordinate, and conduct terminal control of fires in support of joint, allied, and coalition forces." Per this mission statement, ANGLICOs are not designed to support U.S. Marine Corps maneuver elements. Instead, the doctrinal purpose of ANGLICO is to provide fire support and coordination in support of units adjacent or attached to the MAGTF.

== Overview ==
The mission of ANGLICO is to plan, coordinate, and conduct terminal control of fires in support of joint, allied and coalition forces operating in, or adjacent to, the MAGTF battlespace. Although ANGLICO Marines are best known for their ability to control Close Air Support (CAS), they are equally well trained to employ ground and sea-based fires, to include cannon artillery, rocket artillery, precision guided munitions (such as GMLRS), and naval gunfire support.

== ANGLICO Organization ==
Active component ANGLICOs are assigned to the Marine Expeditionary Force (MEF) Information Group, or MIG. Reserve component ANGLICOs are assigned to the Force Headquarters Group (FHG) of Marine Forces Reserve (MFR).

Because ANGLICOs are designed to support non-USMC forces, they are divided into elements appropriate for each level of a foreign force's structure and include the following:

=== Company Headquarters (Division Cell) ===
The Division Cell serves as the senior USMC fires liaison between the MAGTF and the supported division headquarters. This team is led by the Commanding Officer of the ANGLICO (a combat arms Lieutenant Colonel), the executive officer (often a Naval Aviator), and approximately 15 Marines and Sailors from the company staff. Their equipment is geared towards planning and communication from a headquarters. This is by no means a 'desk job,’ however. During recent deployments to Iraq and Afghanistan, company staffs repeatedly engaged in direct combat with the enemy while visiting smaller teams. Marines from the Company HQ can also form ad hoc Firepower Control Teams (FCT) when required by high operational tempo.

=== Platoon (Brigade) ===
Often referred to as a "Brigade Platoon", this unit supports a brigade of friendly forces, and as such is led by a Major (artillery officer) and an experienced Gunnery Sergeant with an MOS of 0861/8002. The staff is rounded out by an Air Officer (a Naval Aviator – usually a senior USMC captain) and a Naval Gunfire Liaison Officer (NGLO). As with the company headquarters, this unit's equipment is geared toward command post operations vice tactical combat. Marines from the Brigade Platoon HQ can be task organized to form ad hoc FCTs in support of specific operations, and serve as combat replacements/augments for Supporting Arms Liaison Teams (SALT) and FCTs. Because of their small size and the frequency with which they train together before deployments, Brigade Platoons develop distinct identities and tight knit relationships. There are two Brigade Platoons in each active duty ANGLICO, and three Brigade Platoons in each reserve component ANGLICO.

=== Supporting Arms Liaison Team (Battalion) ===
The SALT is designed to provide a comprehensive fire support coordination capability for a supported battalion. A SALT consists of 18 Marines and Sailors: an eight-man SALT headquarters and two five-man FCTs. The SALT leader is a Naval Aviator on a ground tour as a Forward Air Controller (FAC). These Naval Aviators are usually mid to senior captains who have completed several deployments. The SALT Chief is a staff sergeant 0861/8002. Though their primary missions is to provide fire support coordination to the supported battalion, the communications suite, planning capabilities, and experience of the SALT lends them well to "jump" COC operations and robust involvement in the non-fires operations of the supported battalion. Each active and reserve Brigade Platoon contains two SALTs.

=== Firepower Control Team (Company) ===
The FCT (pronounced "Fict") is the basic unit of ANGLICO operations. By the Table of Organization and Equipment (TO&E), there are two FCTs per SALT. Because FCTs are frequently created on an ad hoc basis from the rest of the company, every scout observer and radio operator in ANGLICO is trained and prepared to serve on a FCT. There is also historical precedent for highly motivated support Marines (logisticians, vehicle mechanics, etc.) within ANGLICO to be trained and employed on a FCT.

FCTs are led by junior to mid grade Captains, and sometimes Navy Lieutenants of the same grade, who are qualified JTACs. While the TO&E allows for FCT leaders to hold any ground combat arms MOS, the vast majority of team leaders are artillery officers. The team chief (0861) is a Sergeant. Team members include a senior radio operator (0621 Corporal or Sergeant, a junior (PFC-LCpl) 0861, and a junior 0621. Even this small team may be broken down further based on task organization, especially among MEU detachments. FCTs frequently operate as two teams of 2–3 Marines each, and it is not unheard of for ANGLICO Marines to operate individually while supporting Special Operations Forces (SOF) raids or MEU operations such as Visit, board, search, and seizure (VBSS).

FCTs participate in ground combat operations alongside their supported unit, requesting and controlling air and fire support assets on the unit's behalf. This entails detailed integration with friendly maneuver units (such as patrols and raids) and defensive operations. Because of the team's experience and training, FCTs frequently advise supported company commanders on a broad range of fires and aviation related matters. In the liaison role, MAGTF commanders use ANGLICO teams to understand their partnered units better. Similarly, the supported unit gains a better understanding of the operations of the adjacent MAGTF.

== Employment ==
ANGLICO teams are assigned to direct support of Joint, Allied, or Coalition larger maneuver units. They live, eat, and operate alongside their partnered unit, frequently away from other Marine commands. While ANGLICO units can perform many different tasks, Close Air Support has been its primary mission in recent conflicts. Due to the limited number of JTACs in Iraq and Afghanistan, Marine commanders leveraged ANGLICO to support many units that lacked or had insufficient organic JTACs.

ANGLICO teams worked with many types of units in Iraq and Afghanistan; from conventional Army infantry companies to Special Operations Forces or Iraqi Army unit. Their training at all levels allows them to easily be plugged into any environment. During the height of the Iraq War from 2005-2009, most Iraqi Army units in Al Anbar province had an ANGLICO team assigned in direct support.

== Training ==
ANGLICO is primarily staffed by a mix of Fire Support and Communications personnel. As such their core competencies include coordination and control of artillery fire support, field radio operations, direct air support operations, and naval gunfire spotting. Additionally, ANGLICO has a large number of USMC naval aviators assigned as Forward Air Controllers (FAC), and most senior artillery non-commissioned officers and ground combat arms commissioned officers are trained as Joint Terminal Attack Controllers (JTAC). Both winged FACs and non-aviator JTACs attend the USMC Tactical Air Control Party Course at one of the two Expeditionary Warfare Training Groups, Atlantic (EWTGLANT) or Pacific (EWTGPAC). Many NCOs from both the artillery and communications fields are also trained as Joint Fires Observers (JFO).

ANGLICO Marines also regularly receive further advanced training in other insertion methods, fieldcraft, SERE, and other specialized and demanding activities.

=== Airborne Training and Capabilities ===
The reserve component ANGLICOs maintained their airborne insertion capability and all assigned Marines and Sailors are able to receive airborne training and jump qualification at Fort Benning, Georgia's Army Airborne School. Marines and Sailors from the reserve ANGLICOs who attend Airborne School and complete the requisite number of jumps after graduation are also entitled to earn the Navy and Marine Corps Parachutist insignia. The active component ANGLICOs did not retain their airborne insertion capability after their disbandment in the late 1990s; as such — while both active component companies send Marines and Sailors to the airborne course when seats are available — their members are not eligible for the Navy and Marine Corps Parachutist Insiginia.

ANGLICO units can deploy as an entire company of 150 to support the large-scale operations of an entire Marine Expeditionary Force, or, more commonly, deploy in four to seven Marine and Sailor teams to support the activities of non-Marine units.

=== ANGLICO Basic Course (ABC) ===
Before deactivation in 1999, each ANGLICO ran their own in-house training program called ANGLICO Basic Course (ABC). Historically, this was run by the Third Brigade Platoon, which was composed of Marines who had not yet passed ABC, and their instructional cadre. Since re-activation, operational tempo has largely precluded the re-establishment of this practice. Instead, "ABC-like" courses targeting the entire company have been held in order to solidify manning decisions and 'level the playing field' by giving all ANGLICO Marines (regardless of MOS) training in basic FCT skills.

2d ANGLICO re-instituted biannual ABCs in Spring 2013. 2d ANGLICO has four purposes for ABC: (1) Provide training and verification of a baseline skill level for all ANGLICO Marines, (2) Provide BDE platoon commanders/sergeants information IOT make informed team building decisions, (3) Foster unit cohesion and esprit de corps, and (4) Identify and train support Marines as combat replacements.

== History ==
=== JASCO ===
ANGLICO dates back to World War II and the island-hopping strategy in the Pacific Theater. It was realized that there was a need to coordinate air, naval and artillery gunfire support between the Marines, Navy, Army, and other Allied forces. A Joint Assault Signal Company (JASCO) was created and attached to the 4th Marine Division.

The first use of JASCO was in the Marshall Islands campaign during the assault on Roi Namur. It was subsequently deployed in the Marianas campaign, for the capture of Tinian and Saipan. The unit proved to be so effective that five other JASCOs were created. Perhaps the most famous JASCO is the 594th, for its actions during the Battle of Okinawa (1945) and the Philippines campaign (1944–45).

Following the reorganization of US armed forces in 1947, under the Department of Defense, the primary responsibility for liaison between seaborne fire support and ground forces was transferred to the Navy; consequently the JASCOs were disbanded.

=== Formation of ANGLICO and the Korean War ===
However, in 1949, the Marine Corps began the process of recreating the capability, under the ANGLICO designation. The first such unit, ANGLICO, 2nd Signals Battalion, 2nd Marine Division, was formed in December, 1949 at Camp Lejeune, North Carolina. 1st Marine Division formed a similar unit at around the same time: ANGLICO, 1st Signal Battalion, 1st Marine Division. A third unit, 1st ANGLICO, Fleet Marine Force, Pacific, was activated on 2 March 1951 at Pearl Harbor, Hawaii. The ANGLICOs within 1st and 2nd Marine Divisions saw combat throughout 1950 and 1951 in the Korean War. Detachments from these units also saw combat attached to Republic of Korea Marine Corps battalions, and US Army units.

=== Sub-Unit One, Vietnam War ===
In May 1965, 1st ANGLICO activated Sub Unit One, for duty during the Vietnam War, in which the unit was continuously deployed for eight years. Sub Unit One's first commanding officer was LtCol George H. Albers. It was the only Marine Corps organization reporting directly to Military Assistance Command, Vietnam which assumed operational control of the sub unit in September 1966. Throughout its involvement in Vietnam Sub Unit One NGLO and TACP teams operated in all four tactical zones and was the last Fleet Marine Force unit to stand down from the war. Sub Unit One provided naval gunfire and close air in support of South Vietnamese Army and Marine units, South Korean Army and Korean Marine units, Australian Army, and New Zealand Army, as well as US Army and Marine combat formations. While only an estimated 1,350 men served the sub unit over those eight years they contributed in no small way to almost every combat operation of the war. In March 1972, naval gunfire spotters directing fire from the gunline ships of the US Navy provided the only counter-battery fire directed at North Vietnamese artillery that hit I Corps in advance of the Easter Offensive. Unit strength at that time was only 107 officers and men both Navy and Marine who with their backs to the wall made up the numbers deficit by tenaciously providing around the clock support.

=== 1970s ===
In the late 1970s, under the leadership of LtCol James E. Toth, 2nd ANGLICO began experimenting with the concept of the "Universal Spotter": a Marine trained to coordinate and control fires from artillery, naval gunfire, and Close Air Support (CAS); previously the organization of ANGLICO, USMC artillery and infantry units provided separate shore fire control party teams, artillery liaison and tactical air control party teams for the observation and control of supporting arms for both USMC and other forces maneuver units. The experimental concept relied on company level teams known as Firepower Control Teams (FCTs) containing personnel and equipment to control fires for all supporting arms and battalion level groups known as Supporting Arms Liaison Teams (SALTs) responsible for coordination of all supporting arms renabled 2nd ANGLICO to greatly reduce the number personnel required to support US Army and allied units and streamlined the request for and approval of the delivery of terminal control of USMC and USN supporting arms. The Universal Spotter concept was later adopted by all ANGLICOs and was the forerunner of today's Joint Terminal Attack Controller (JTAC) and Joint Fires Observers (JFO).

=== 1980s, Beirut, and Grenada ===
The early 1980s saw ANGLICOs (particularly 2nd ANGLICO) operating at a high tempo; between June 1982 and March 1984, the company supported 35 operations with US Army and Allied nations, ranging from arctic operations in northern Norway, exercises in the Mediterranean, TACP support for USN carrier wings in the Caribbean and training operations with South American militaries. Additionally, elements of the company participated in sensitive peacekeeping operations in Beirut, Lebanon for the PLO evacuation and subsequently the Multi-national Peace Keeping Force. 2nd ANGLICO teams supported British, Italian, French and Lebanese Army elements and engaged enemy targets on several occasions via USMC, USN and Lebanese supporting arms, including 16" naval gunfire from the USS New Jersey and 122mm rocket fire from Lebanese Army BM21 multiple rocket launchers. A 2nd ANGLICO SALT officer conducted naval gunfire spotting from an A-6 Intruder, the first time this had been done from this platform.

Also, despite having nearly a third of its strength engaged internationally, for the first time in its history 2nd ANGLICO deployed in support of 18th Airborne Corps for Operation Urgent Fury (Invasion of Grenada). This was also the first time an entire US Army Division, the 82nd Airborne Division was supported during combat operations. 2nd ANGLICO teams airlanded at Point Salines airfield with the division's first elements and controlled USN LTV A-7 Corsair II aircraft in close air support and assisted in deconflicting indirect fires from Army units.

During the mid-to-late 1980s, under LtCol J. M. Wills and LtGen A. M. Gray (later Commandant of the Marine Corps) 2nd ANGLICO went through a period of refocusing on core skills including regular live naval gunfire training with the USS Iowa battleship, and more frequent mass tactical exercises with the Army's 82nd Airborne Division. Additionally, the 2nd ANGLICO began to train in Low Intensity Conflict response with weapon systems such as the Air Force AC-130 Spectre, Special Patrol Insertion/Extraction and Fast Rope insertion methods.

=== De-activation of active component ANGLICOs ===
In 1999, all active-duty ANGLICO units (1st and 2d ANGLICO) were deactivated and their responsibilities transferred to the much smaller Marine Liaison Elements in each Marine Expeditionary Force headquarters. However, the Marine Corps chose to retain 3rd and 4th ANGLICO with their previous capability and strength in the Reserves.

=== Iraq War ===
In 2003, amidst the US war in Iraq and Global War on Terror and a high operational tempo being demanded of the reserve ANGLICO units, 1st and 2d ANGLICO were reactivated (although their status as jump units has never returned). Shortly thereafter, in 2004, 5th ANGLICO was formed.

=== ANGLICO Operations in Afghanistan ===
In 2008, ANGLICO began supporting combat operations in Helmand Province, Afghanistan, in support of Operation Enduring Freedom. A detachment from 2nd ANGLICO was sent as part of SMAGTF-A, and in 2009, the brigade platoon from 2nd, followed by a detachment from 1st ANGLICO and one from 3rd, joined the 2nd Marine Expeditionary Brigade.

=== Formation of 6th ANGLICO ===
In 2013, 6th ANGLICO was formed in Concord, California, with a third brigade platoon detachment at Joint Base Lewis-McChord, Washington. In 2018, 6th ANGLICO relocated the HQ and a brigade platoon to Joint Base Lewis-McChord, Washington. In 2019, the final Brigade Platoon was relocated to JBLM and the Concord Reserve Training Center was turned over to Marine Corps Advisor Company Bravo.

== Current units ==
Six ANGLICOs currently exist in the U.S. Marine Corps:

| Insignia | Name | part of | Location |
|---|---|---|---|
| | 1st Air Naval Gunfire Liaison Company (1st ANGLICO) | I Marine Expeditionary Force, I MEF Information Group | Marine Corps Base Camp Pendleton, California |
| | 2nd Air Naval Gunfire Liaison Company (2nd ANGLICO) | II Marine Expeditionary Force, II MEF Information Group | Marine Corps Base Camp Lejeune, North Carolina |
| | 3rd Air Naval Gunfire Liaison Company (3rd ANGLICO) | Marine Forces Reserve, Force Headquarters Group | Bell, California |
| | 4th Air Naval Gunfire Liaison Company (4th ANGLICO) | Marine Forces Reserve, Force Headquarters Group | West Palm Beach, Florida |
| | 5th Air Naval Gunfire Liaison Company (5th ANGLICO) | III Marine Expeditionary Force, III MEF Information Group | Camp Hansen, Okinawa Prefecture, Japan |
| | 6th Air Naval Gunfire Liaison Company (6th ANGLICO) | Marine Forces Reserve, Force Headquarters Group | Joint Base Lewis-McChord, Washington |

== Notable former members ==
- Joseph Dunford (36th Commandant of the Marine Corps)
- Johnny Micheal Spann (First American Killed in Afghanistan)
- Dan Sullivan (Senator from Alaska)
- Owen West (Assistant Secretary of Defense for Special Operations and Low-Intensity Conflict)

== See also ==
- United States Air Force Special Tactics Officer
- United States Air Force Combat Control Team
- 148 (Meiktila) Battery Royal Artillery
- Organization of the United States Marine Corps
