= Roger Turner (general) =

American Marine Corps general

Roger B. Turner
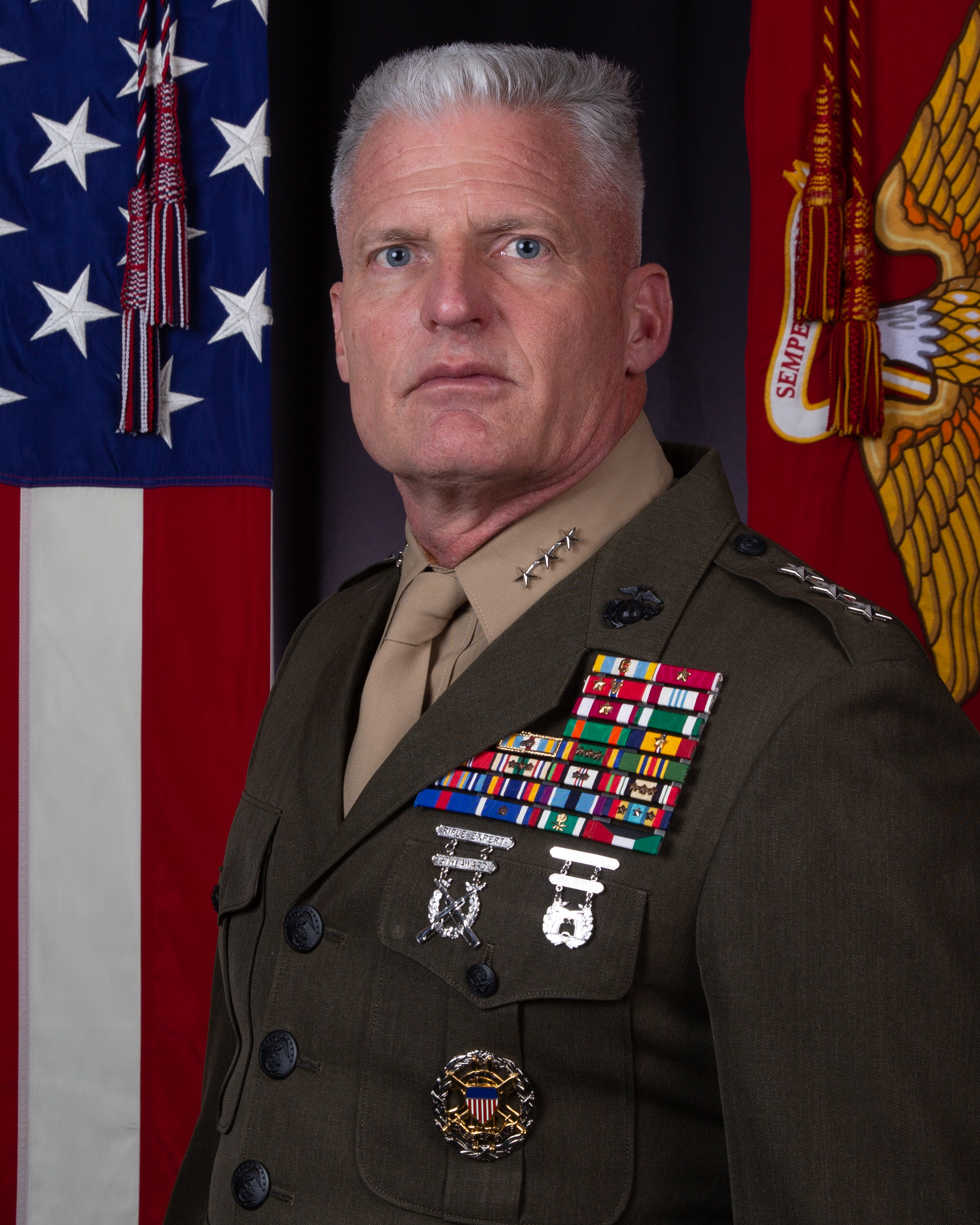
- Official portrait, 2024
- Born: Laurel, Maryland
- Education: University of Maryland; Marine Corps Command and Staff College; Naval War College
- Military career
- Allegiance: United States
- Branch: United States Marine Corps
- Service years: 1984–present
- Rank: Lieutenant General
- Commands: U.S. Marine Corps Forces, Pacific; Fleet Marine Force, Pacific; III Marine Expeditionary Force; 1st Marine Division; Marine Air Ground Task Force Training Command; Marine Corps Air Ground Combat Center; Task Force Southwest; 5th Marine Regiment; 3rd Battalion, 5th Marines
- Conflicts: Gulf War; Iraq War; War in Afghanistan
- Awards: Defense Superior Service Medal; Legion of Merit; Bronze Star Medal (Combat V)

Roger B. Turner Jr. is an American lieutenant general who has served as the commander of United States Marine Corps Forces, Pacific, and Fleet Marine Force, Pacific, since 2026. He previously served as the commanding general of III Marine Expeditionary Force from 2024 to 2026, and as acting Deputy Commandant for Plans, Policies, and Operations from 2023 to 2024.

Turner is a native of Laurel, Maryland. He enlisted in the United States Marine Corps in 1984, and attended the University of Maryland before being commissioned as an officer in 1989, also attending The Basic School. Turner was deployed for the Gulf War, the Iraq War, and the war in Afghanistan. He obtained master's degrees from the Marine Corps Command and Staff College and the Naval War College. His notable commands have included the 3rd Battalion, 7th Marines, from 2005 to 2007; the 5th Marine Regiment from 2011 to 2013; the Marine Air Ground Task Force Training Command from 2018 to 2020; and the 1st Marine Division from 2020 to 2022. His awards include the Defense Superior Service Medal, the Legion of Merit, and the Bronze Star with valor.

== Early life and education ==
Roger B. Turner Jr. is a native of Laurel, Maryland. Turner enlisted in the United States Marine Corps in June 1984 and went to basic training at Marine Corps Recruit Depot Parris Island. He later attended the University of Maryland while serving in the Reserve. Turner was commissioned as an officer in May 1989 and was then sent to attend The Basic School and the Infantry Officer Course. His education also includes a Master of Military Art and Science degree from the Marine Corps Command and Staff College and a Master of National Security and Strategic Studies degree from the Naval War College. He is also a graduate of the Marine Corps Amphibious Warfare School and the United Kingdom's Higher Command and Staff Course.

== Marine Corps career ==
Turner served in the 3rd Battalion, 5th Marines, from 1990 to 1993 as a platoon and company commander. During that time he was deployed for the Gulf War (Operation Desert Shield/Storm) and Operation Sea Angel in Bangladesh. After that, he served as a tactics instructor at The Basic School in Quantico, Virginia, from 1993 to 1994, and then had the same role at the Infantry Officer Course from 1994 to 1996. After attending the Marine Corps Amphibious Warfare School, he served as a company commander in the 2nd Battalion, 5th Marines, where he deployed with the 31st Marine Expeditionary Unit to the Western Pacific from 1997 to 1998. He served as weapons officer of the 5th Marine Regiment from 1998 to 2000, and then attended the Marine Corps Command and Staff College from 2000 to 2001.

Following his completion of the Marine Corps Command and Staff College in 2001, Turner commanded the Marine Corps Recruit Station, Sacramento, California. He was the current operations officer of the 1st Marine Division from 2004 to 2005, when it was deployed for the Iraq War, and then commanded the 3rd Battalion, 7th Marines from April 2005 to December 2007. While Turner was in command, the battalion had two deployments to Ramadi, Iraq, which took place during 2005, 2006 and 2007. Turner then attended the Naval War College before serving as an operations officer, Joint Operations Division Central Command, Operations Directorate, Joint Staff, in washington, D.C., from March 2009 to March 2011.

Turner took command of the 5th Marine Regiment in April 2011 and led Regimental Combat Team 5 on a deployment to Helmand Province, Afghanistan, during the war in Afghanistan, from 2011 to 2012. He relinquished command of the regiment in June 2013. He then became Military Secretary to the Commandant of the Marine Corps, serving until 2014. Turner was the director, Capabilities Development Directorate, Combat Development and Integration, from 2015 to 2017, then served as the commanding general of the Marine Air Ground Task Force Training Command and the Marine Corps Air Ground Combat Center from June 2018 to September 2020. Later that month, Turner took command of the 1st Marine Division.

He relinquished command of the 1st Marine Division in July 2022. Turner then served as director, Operations Division, Plans, Policies, and Operations at Headquarters Marine Corps. In April 2023, Turner was nominated for promotion to lieutenant general and assignment as the commanding general of III Marine Expeditionary Force. He served as acting Deputy Commandant for Plans, Policies, and Operations of the Marine Corps, before assuming command of III Marine Expeditionary Force on January 26, 2024. Turner relinquished command on July 15, 2026, and assumed command of United States Marine Corps Forces, Pacific, and Fleet Marine Force, Pacific, on August 11, 2026.

== Awards and decorations ==
Turner's decorations and medals include:

Defense Superior Service Medal with "C" device		Legion of Merit with gold award star	Bronze Star Medal with Combat "V" and gold award star
Defense Meritorious Service Medal	Meritorious Service Medal with gold award star	Navy and Marine Corps Commendation Medal	Navy and Marine Corps Achievement Medal
Combat Action Ribbon with gold award star	Joint Meritorious Unit Award with oak leaf cluster	Navy Unit Commendation with three bronze service stars	Navy Meritorious Unit Commendation
National Defense Service Medal with service star	Southwest Asia Service Medal with three bronze service stars	Afghanistan Campaign Medal with two bronze service stars	Iraq Campaign Medal with three bronze service stars
Global War on Terrorism Expeditionary Medal	Global War on Terrorism Service Medal	Humanitarian Service Medal	Sea Service Deployment Ribbon with seven service stars
Marine Corps Recruiting Ribbon	NATO Medal for Yugoslavia with bronze service star	Kuwait Liberation Medal (Saudi Arabia)	Kuwait Liberation Medal (Kuwait)
Rifle Expert Badge		Pistol Expert Badge	
Office of the Joint Chiefs of Staff Identification Badge

== Personal life ==
He is married to Carole, and they have two sons.

Military offices
Preceded by James Bierman	Military Secretary to the Commandant of the Marine Corps; 2013–2014	Succeeded by Michael Cederholm
Preceded by ???	Director of Capabilities Development of United States Marine Corps; 2015–2016	Succeeded by ???
Preceded by ???	Commanding General of Task Force Southwest; 2016–2018	Succeeded by Benjamin T. Watson
Preceded by William F. Mullen III	Commanding General of the Marine Air-Ground Task Force Training Command and Marine Corps Air Ground Combat Center; 2018–2020	Succeeded by William Jurney
Preceded by Robert F. Castellvi	Commanding General of the 1st Marine Division; 2020–2022	Succeeded by Benjamin T. Watson
Preceded by ???	Director of the Operations Division, Office of the Deputy Commandant for Plans, Policies and Operations; 2022–2023	Succeeded by Jason L. Morris
Preceded by David Furness	Deputy Commandant for Plans, Policies, and Operations of the United States Marine Corps; Acting; 2023–2024	Succeeded by James Bierman
Preceded by James Bierman	Commanding General of the III Marine Expeditionary Force; 2024–2026	Succeeded by Benjamin T. Watson
Preceded by James F. Glynn	Commander of the United States Marine Corps Forces, Pacific; Commanding General of the Fleet Marine Force, Pacific; 2026–present	Incumbent
