= Anthony Henderson =

Anthony Henderson may refer to:

- Anthony M. Henderson (born 1966), U.S. Marine Corps general
- Tony Henderson (born 1954), English footballer
- Krayzie Bone (Anthony Henderson, born 1973), American rapper
