= Calvert L. Worth Jr. =

United States Marine Corps general

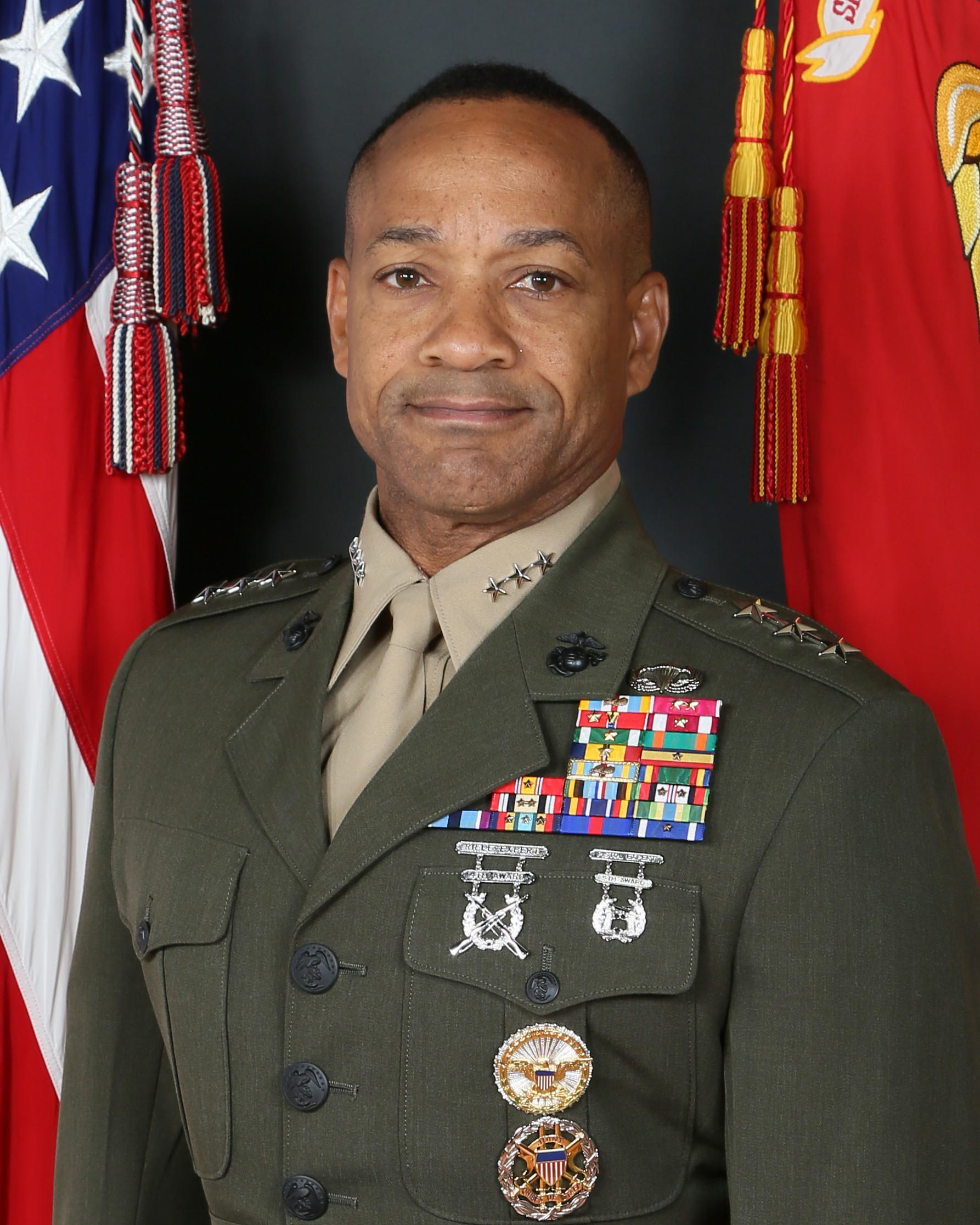
- Official portrait, 2024
- Military career
- Allegiance: United States
- Branch: United States Marine Corps
- Service years: 1991–present
- Rank: Lieutenant General
- Commands: U.S. Marine Corps Forces Command; Fleet Marine Force, Atlantic; II Marine Expeditionary Force; 2nd Marine Division; Task Force Southwest; Marine Corps Training Command; 6th Marine Regiment; Special Purpose Marine Air-Ground Task Force – Crisis Response – Africa; 1st Battalion, 6th Marines
- Awards: Defense Superior Service Medal (3); Legion of Merit (3); Bronze Star Medal (2)

Calvert L. Worth Jr. is a United States Marine Corps lieutenant general who has served as the Commander of United States Marine Corps Forces Command since August 5, 2026. He has previously served as the commanding general of II Marine Expeditionary Force from August 2, 2024 to August 5, 2026. He previously served as the commanding general of the 2nd Marine Division from 2022 to 2024.

Worth earned a bachelor's degree from University of Missouri. He later received a Masters of Military Studies and a Masters Degree in Operational Studies both from Marine Corps University; and a Masters of Science in National Security Strategy from the National Defense University. Worth served numerous assignments including Rifle Platoon Commander, Weapons Platoon Commander and Battalion Adjutant in 2nd Battalion, 4th Marine Regiment; Weapons Company Executive Officer in 2d Battalion, 6th Marine Regiment; Assistant Operations Officer in 1st Battalion, 6th Marine Regiment; Company Commander and Battalion Executive Officer in 1st Battalion, 5th Marine Regiment; Commanding Officer of 1st Battalion, 6th Marine Regiment; Commanding Officer of the 6th Marine Regiment.

Worth has served as the Military Assistant to the DoD Executive Secretary in the Office of the Secretary of Defense; Service as the Marine Military Assistant to the Under Secretary of the Navy; service in the Joint Staff J-3, J35 Regional Operations as the Division Chief, Joint Operations Division-CENTCOM. Prior to his division command, he served as the Director of Strategy, Policy and Plans (J5) in U.S. Southern Command.

In May 2024, Worth was nominated for promotion to lieutenant general and assignment as commanding general of the II Marine Expeditionary Force.

== Awards and decorations ==

Military offices
Preceded by Jason Bohm	Commanding General of the Marine Corps Training Command; 2018–2019	Succeeded by Jason L. Morris
Preceded by Julian Alford	Commanding General of Task Force Southwest; 2019–2020	Succeeded by ???
Preceded by David L. Odom	Assistant Division Commander of the 2nd Marine Division; 2020–2021	Succeeded by Robert J. Hallett
Preceded by Rick A. Uribe	Director of Strategy, Plans, and Policy of the United States Southern Command; 2021–2022	Succeeded by Julie L. Nethercot
Preceded by Francis L. Donovan	Commanding General of the 2nd Marine Division; 2022–2024	Succeeded by David L. Odom
Preceded by David Ottignon	Commanding General of the II Marine Expeditionary Force; 2024–2026	Succeeded by Robert C. Fulford
Preceded by Roberta L. Shea	Commander of the United States Marine Corps Forces Command; 2026–present	Incumbent
