= Julian C. Smith Hall =

Coordinates: 34°40′33″N 77°22′03″W

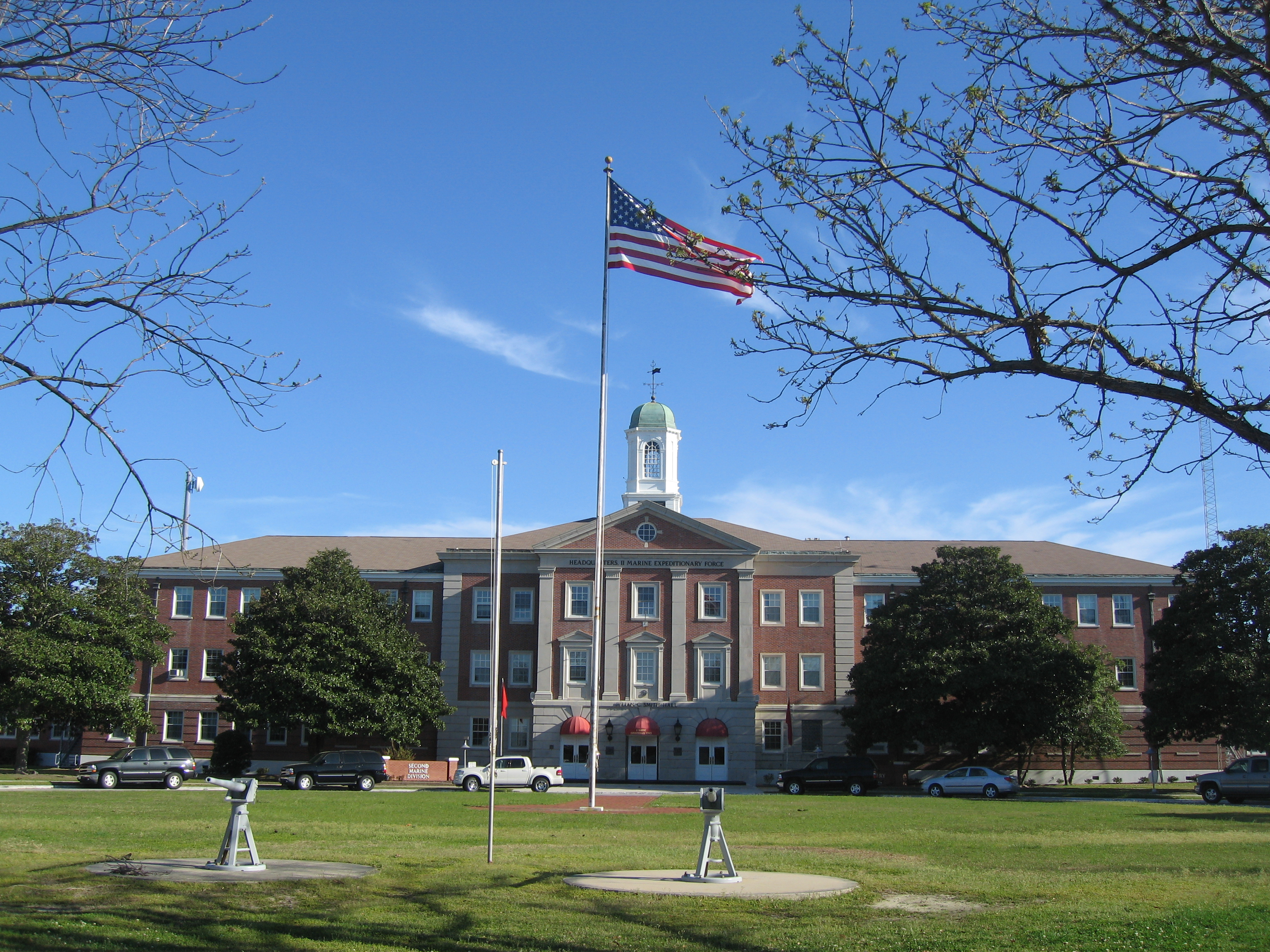
- Julian C. Smith Hall
- Interactive map of the Julian C. Smith Hall area

General information
- Location: Julian C. Smith Drive; Marine Corps Base Camp Lejeune; Jacksonville, North Carolina, United States

The Julian C. Smith Hall is a historic building located on Julian C. Smith Drive, on Hadnot Point in Marine Corps Base Camp Lejeune, Jacksonville, North Carolina. It currently serves as the headquarters building for the II Marine Expeditionary Force and the 2d Marine Division. It is named after Lieutenant General Julian C. Smith, former commanding general of the 2d Marine Division during World War II. The Camp Lejeune address is Building H-1.

== History ==
The building was initially used as a Naval hospital.
