= Command Element (United States Marine Corps) =

Headquarters component of the U.S. Marine Corps' Marine Air-Ground Task Forces

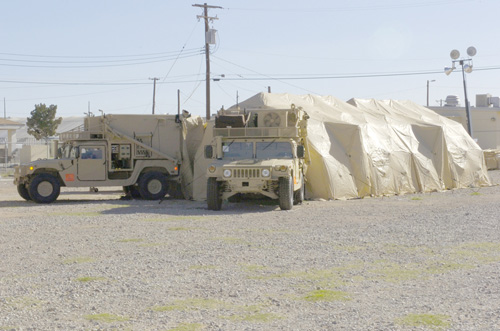
USMC Combat Operations Center

In the United States Marine Corps, the Command Element (CE) is the command and control force of a Marine Air-Ground Task Force (MAGTF). It provides C3I for the MAGTF.

== Role within the MAGTF ==
The Command Element (CE), a headquarters unit organized into a MAGTF (MEU, MEB, MEF) headquarters (HQ) group, that exercises command and control (management and planning for manpower, intelligence, operations and training, and logistics functions) over the other elements of the MAGTF. The HQ group consists of communications, intelligence, surveillance, and law enforcement (i.e., military police) detachments, companies, and battalions, and reconnaissance (Force Reconnaissance), and liaison (ANGLICO) platoons, detachments, and companies.

== Organization ==
The size of the CE varies in proportion to the size of the MAGTF. A Marine Expeditionary Force has a MEF Information Group, approximately the size of a regiment. A Marine Expeditionary Brigade holds a battalion-sized MEB Information Group. The various Marine Expeditionary Units command a company-sized MEU Information Group. Generally, MEF postings are permanent, while MEBs and MEUs rotate their GCE, ACE, and LCE twice annually.

=== Hierarchy of Marine command units ===
==== I Marine Expeditionary Force Information Group ====
CE of I Marine Expeditionary Force

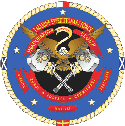

Insignia	Name	Location
	I MEF Support Battalion	Marine Corps Base Camp Pendleton, California
	1st Intelligence Battalion	Marine Corps Base Camp Pendleton, California
	1st Radio Battalion	Marine Corps Base Camp Pendleton, California
	9th Communication Battalion	Marine Corps Base Camp Pendleton, California
	1st Air Naval Gunfire Liaison Company	Marine Corps Base Camp Pendleton, California

==== II Marine Expeditionary Force Information Group ====
CE of II Marine Expeditionary Force

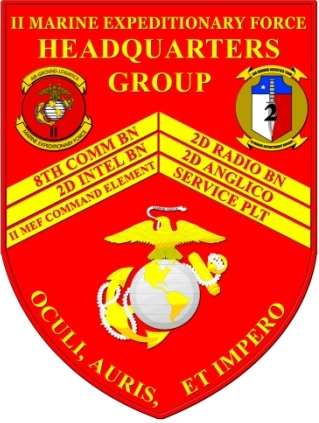

Insignia	Name	Location
	II MEF Support Battalion	Marine Corps Base Camp Lejeune, North Carolina
	2nd Intelligence Battalion	Marine Corps Base Camp Lejeune, North Carolina
	2nd Radio Battalion	Marine Corps Base Camp Lejeune, North Carolina
	8th Communications Battalion	Marine Corps Base Camp Lejeune, North Carolina
	Chemical Biological Incident Response Force	Indian Head Naval Surface Warfare Center, Maryland
	2nd Air Naval Gunfire Liaison Company	Marine Corps Base Camp Lejeune, North Carolina

==== III Marine Expeditionary Force Information Group ====
CE of III Marine Expeditionary Force

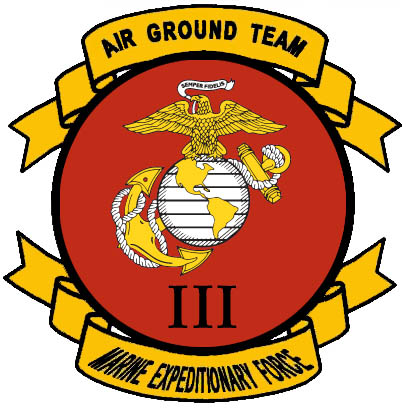

Insignia	Name	Location
	III MEF Support Battalion	Camp Hansen, Okinawa Prefecture, Japan
	3rd Intelligence Battalion	Camp Hansen, Okinawa Prefecture, Japan
	3rd Radio Battalion	Marine Corps Base Hawaii
	7th Communication Battalion	Camp Hansen, Okinawa Prefecture, Japan
	5th Air Naval Gunfire Liaison Company	Camp Hansen, Okinawa Prefecture, Japan

==== Marine Forces Reserve CE units ====
Force Headquarters Group

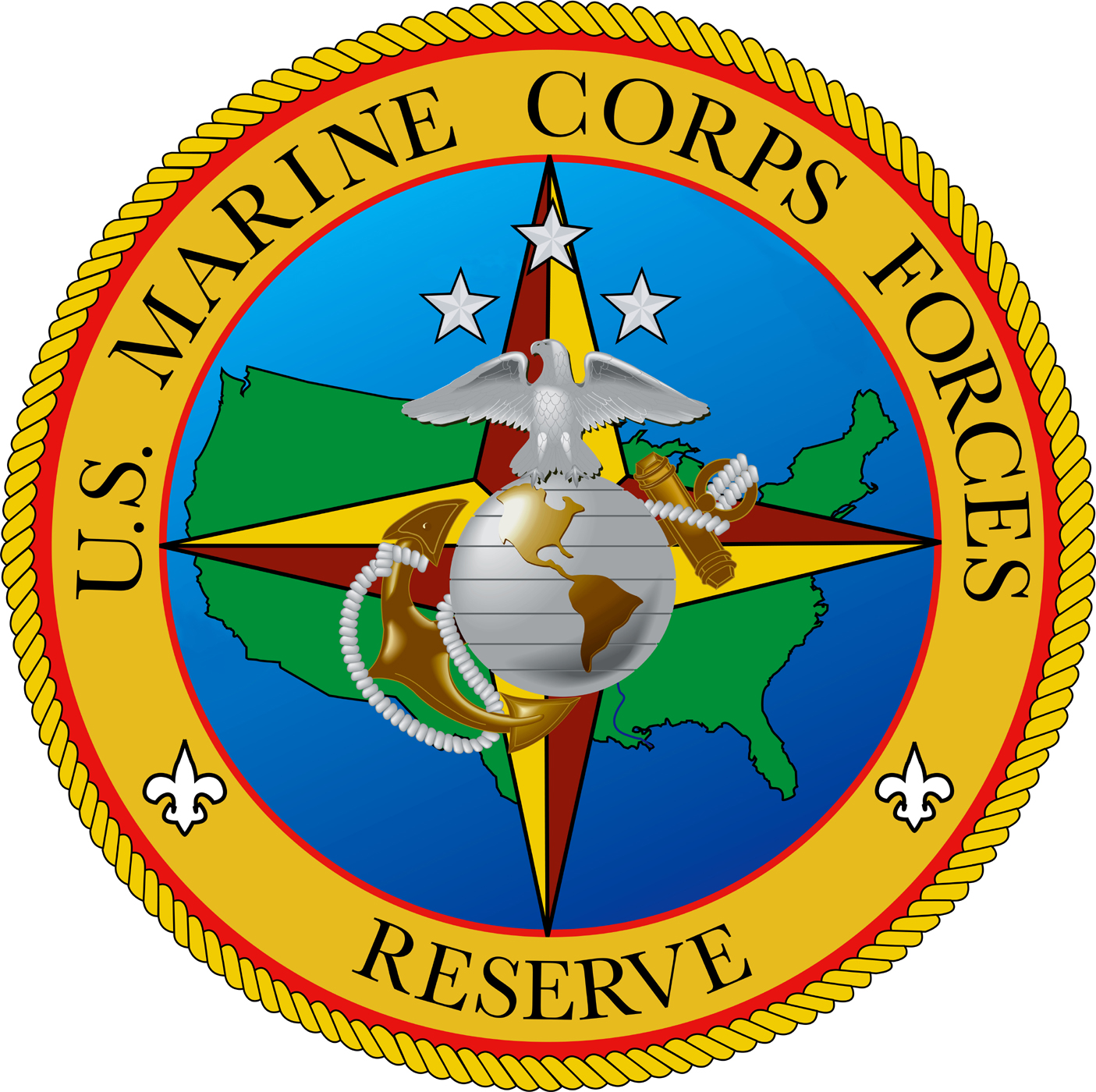

Insignia	Name	Location
	Intelligence Support Battalion	New Orleans, Louisiana
	4th Law Enforcement Battalion	
	6th Communications Battalion; Note: also fall under 4th Marine Logistics Group	New York City, New York
	1st Civil Affairs Group	Marine Corps Base Camp Pendleton, California
	2nd Civil Affairs Group	Naval Support Facility Anacostia, Washington, D.C.
	3rd Civil Affairs Group	Naval Station Great Lakes, Illinois
	4th Civil Affairs Group	Hialeah, Florida
	3rd Air Naval Gunfire Liaison Company	Long Beach, California
	4th Air Naval Gunfire Liaison Company	West Palm Beach, Florida
	6th Air Naval Gunfire Liaison Company	Concord, California
	3rd Force Reconnaissance Company; Note: Operational Control (OPCON) to II Marine Expeditionary Force	Mobile, Alabama
	4th Force Reconnaissance Company; Note: Operational Control (OPCON) to I Marine Expeditionary Force	Marine Corps Base Hawaii

== See also ==
- Marine Expeditionary Force
- Marine Air-Ground Task Force
