= 8th Communication Battalion =

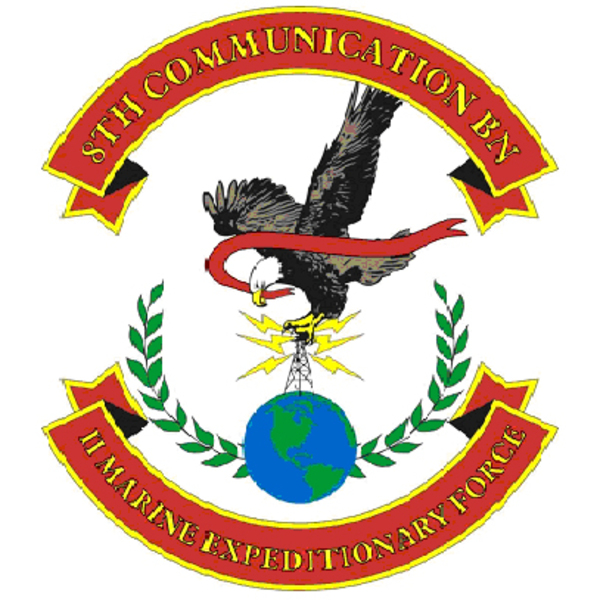
- 8th Comm's insignia
- Country: United States
- Branch: USMC
- Type: Communications
- Part of: II Marine Expeditionary Force Headquarters Group
- Engagements: Operation Iraqi Freedom

Commanders
- Current commander: Lieutenant Colonel John Henderson

8th Communication Battalion (8th Comm) is a communications battalion in the United States Marine Corps. It is part of the II Marine Expeditionary Force (II MEF) and is headquartered at Marine Corps Base Camp Lejeune, North Carolina.

== Mission ==
On order, deploy task-organized, self-sustaining combat-ready detachments capable of providing command, control, communications, and computer (C4) support to CG MARFORLANT, CG II MEF, Subordinate MAGTF, and MEU Commanders, in support of Joint and/or Combined operations in any environment and across the spectrum of combat alls conflict.

== History ==
What is known today as 8th Communication Battalion was activated 15 January 1951 at Camp Geiger, North Carolina, as the 2d Signal Operations Company, Fleet Marine Force Atlantic. The unit was reassigned and relocated to its current location at Camp Lejeune, North Carolina on 1 April 1951 to Force Troops, Fleet Marine Force and re-designated 24 November 1952 as 8th Signal Battalion, Force Troops, Fleet Marine Force Atlantic. The unit was again re-designated 2 August 1954 as 8th Communication Battalion, Force Troops, Fleet Marine Force Atlantic. The Battalion was assigned the primary mission of providing communication support to a Marine Air Ground Task Force (MAGTF) Headquarters when deployed and to operate general communication support to Marine operations as required.

Various elements participated in the Landings in Lebanon, the Cuban Missile Crisis, and the Intervention in the Dominican Republic from 1958-1965. In June 1966, 8th Communication Battalion provided administrative and technical management of the Fleet Marine Force Atlantic Communication School. The Battalion continued to operate the communication school until 1 December 1967. In 1960, Battalion personnel were sent to form the communication section for Camp Garcia, Vieques, Puerto Rico and continued to provide personnel until 1976.

8th Communication Battalion was reassigned during January 1976 to Force Troops, 2nd Force Service Support Group, Fleet Marine Force Atlantic and participated in numerous training exercises throughout the 1970s and 1980s. Various elements provided support to the multinational peacekeeping force in Lebanon from 1982-1984, provided support to the landing on Grenada-Carriacou from October–November 1983 and provided support to operations in the Persian Gulf in April 1988.

8th Communication Battalion was reassigned during February 1989 to 2nd Surveillance Reconnaissance and Intelligence Group, II Marine Expeditionary Force, Fleet Marine Force Atlantic. Various elements participated in operations in Panama from December 1989-January 1990, operations in Liberia in June 1990, Operations Desert Shield and Desert Storm, Southwest Asia from August 1990–April 1991, operations in Somalia in January 1991, operations in Bosnia from February–March 1996.

Various Battalion elements participated in Operation Enduring Freedom in Afghanistan, the Horn of Africa and Cuba from 2002 – 2008. The Battalion also supported humanitarian relief efforts in Louisiana and Mississippi in response to Hurricane Katrina from September–October 2005. 8th Communication Battalion deployed during January 2003 to Kuwait in support of Operation Enduring Freedom and participated in Operation Iraqi Freedom, Iraq, March–June 2003; since then the Battalion and its Detachments have deployed successive occasions in support of Operation Iraqi Freedom including February 2005 to March 2006, January 2007 to February 2008 and during 2009. 8th Communication Battalion continued to support operations in support of Operation Enduring Freedom in Afghanistan through 2014, as well as its traditional mission of providing robust detachments for rotational deployments by the 22nd, 24th, and 26th Marine Expeditionary Units.

Today, 8th Communication Battalion is composed of close to one thousand Marines and Sailors and employs over thirteen thousand end items valued at nearly $200 million. Its mission is to provide secure expeditionary communications to Marine Air Guard Task Force, Marine Component Headquarters, and other command elements to enable command and control.

== Unit awards ==
Navy Meritorious Unit Commendation (MUC): Lieutenant Colonel Kevin M. Shea Award on 7 May 2010 for communications unit of the year 2009.

8th Communication Battalion's decorations include Navy Unit Commendation Streamer with three Bronze Stars; the Meritorious Unit Commendation Streamer; the National Defense Service Streamer with three Bronze Stars; the Southwest Asia Service Streamer with three Bronze Stars; the Afghanistan Campaign Streamer with one Bronze Star; the Iraq Campaign Streamer with three Bronze Stars; the Global War on Terrorism Expeditionary Streamer; and the Global War on Terrorism Service Streamer.

== See also ==
- List of United States Marine Corps battalions
- Organization of the United States Marine Corps
