= Anthony M. Henderson =

U.S. Marine Corps general (born 1966)

Anthony Henderson
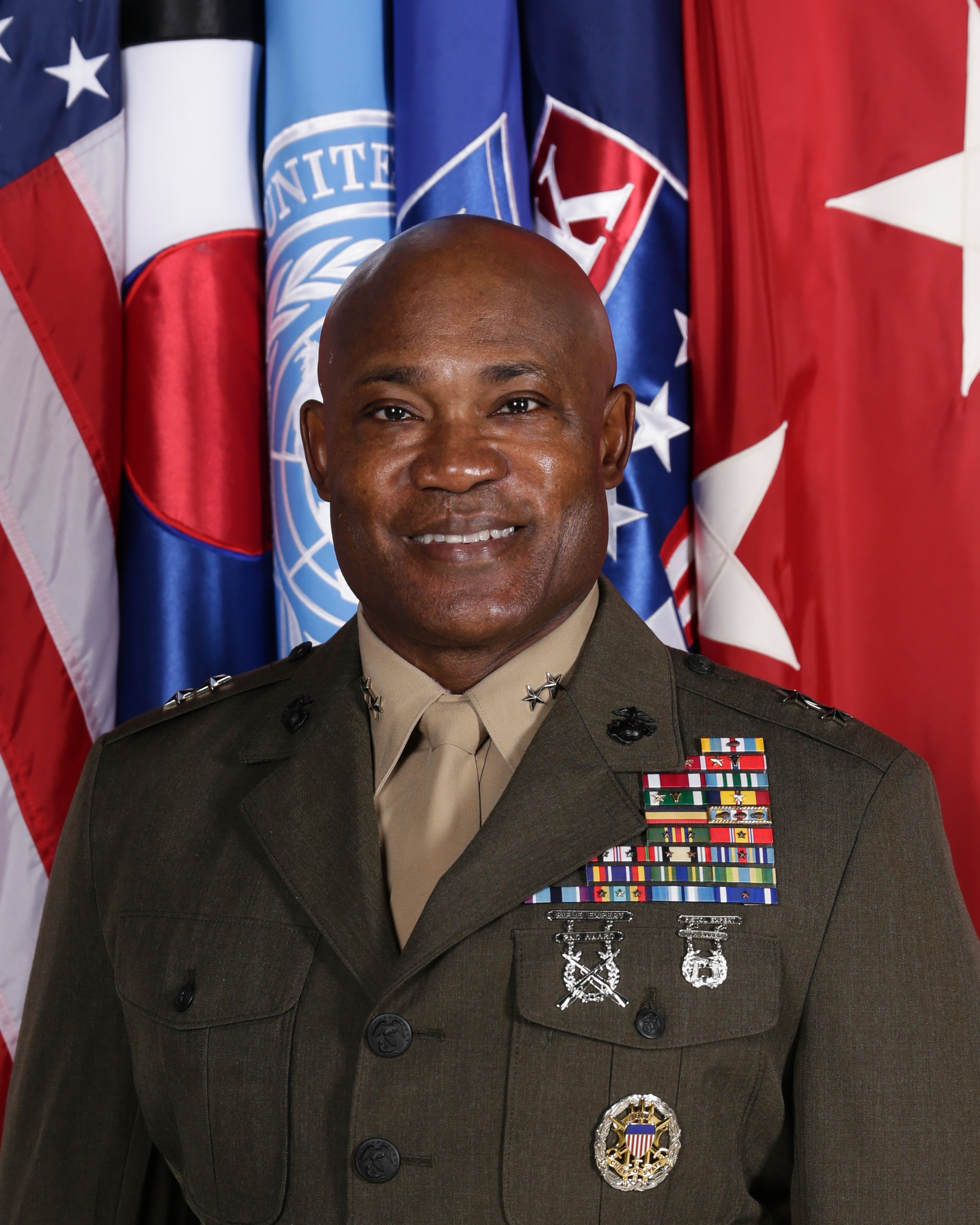
- Born: September 6, 1966 (age 60); Washington, D.C., U.S.
- Education: Southern University; Naval War College; National Defense University
- Military career
- Allegiance: United States
- Branch: United States Marine Corps
- Service years: 1989–present
- Rank: Major General
- Commands: Marine Corps Training Command; 2nd Marine Expeditionary Brigade
- Conflicts: War in Afghanistan; Iraq War
- Awards: Navy and Marine Corps Commendation Medal; Joint Service Commendation Medal; Bronze Star Medal; Defense Superior Service Medal (2); Legion of Merit (2); Combat Action Ribbon

Anthony M. Henderson is a major general in the United States Marine Corps and is currently serving as the Commanding General, Marine Corps Training Command, since 2024. He previously served as deputy director for joint strategic planning of the Joint Staff, commander of the 2nd Marine Expeditionary Brigade, and director of concepts and plans at the Marine Corps Warfighting Laboratory.

== Early life and education ==
Born in Washington, D.C., he was commissioned as a second lieutenant in 1989, and obtained a Juris Doctor degree from Southern University Law Center in 1994 with a view to become a staff judge advocate, but chose to join the combat arms. His other military education includes the Amphibious Warfare School, the Naval War College, and the National War College. He also completed the Harvard School of Business Executive Education Program and MIT Seminar XXI Executive Program.

== Marine Corps career ==
As a line officer, he saw action in Iraq and as a battalion commander in Afghanistan, where he earned multiple awards, including the Bronze Star and Iraq Campaign Medal, for his actions in service during Operation Iraqi freedom. He was deployed for the invasion of Iraq in 2003 with the 3rd Battalion, 7th Marines. He returned to Iraq from February to September 2004, during which he was deployed along the Iraq–Syria border. In 2008 Henderson was sent to Afghanistan with the 1st Battalion, 6th Marines. There, his marines credited him with keeping almost all of them alive in a victorious battle against the Taliban at Jugroom Fort, Helmand Province, and stories of his personal courage in the engagement became part of Marine lore. His leadership prowess has also been reported at Entrepreneur magazine, by Jeremy Knauff, who served under his command.

He was appointed commander of the 13th Marine Expeditionary Unit in 2014. As of March 2021, he served as director of concepts and plans at the Marine Corps Warfighting Laboratory. In March 2021, the Marine Corps selected and confirmed Henderson for promotion to brigadier general, pending Senate confirmation.

He was promoted to brigadier general on July 1, 2021. He also became commander of the 2nd Marine Expeditionary Brigade and deputy commanding general of II Marine Expeditionary Force.

On November 10, 2022, Henderson was cast as a key role in the Marine Corps' 247th birthday message, emphasizing confidence and lethality.

Throughout his career, he has maintained a commitment, both on the battlefield and at home, to fellow service members though a combination of government and private sector programs, and peer support systems.

In April 2022, Henderson led a Marine unit in a NATO joint training exercise, named "Cold Response," with Italian, French, and Dutch troops in the Arctic as part of the military's continued preparation for combat in different environments.

Henderson later served as Deputy Director, Joint Strategic Planning, on the Joint Staff (J5), and in June 2024, he became the commanding general of Marine Corps Training Command.

== Awards and decorations ==

Defense Superior Service Medal with oak leaf cluster
Legion of Merit with two gold award stars	Bronze Star Medal with gold award star Combat V	Meritorious Service Medal	Joint Service Commendation Medal
Combat Action Ribbon with award star	Joint Meritorious Unit Award with three oak leaf clusters	Navy and Marine Corps Commendation Medal with award star and Combat V	United States Navy Presidential Unit Citation ribbon
Navy Meritorious Unit Commendation with two service stars	National Defense Service Medal with service star	Afghanistan Campaign Medal with two service stars	Iraq Campaign Medal with two service stars
Global War on Terrorism Expeditionary Medal with service star	Global War on Terrorism Service Medal	Korea Defense Service Medal	Military Outstanding Volunteer Service Medal
Sea Service Deployment Ribbon with seven service stars	Humanitarian Service Medal	Navy Arctic Service Ribbon	NATO Medal Non-Article 5 for the Balkans with service star
Expert Rifle Badge		Expert Pistol Badge	

== Personal life ==
He is married to Sonja, a retired colonel of the United States Army, and they have six children.

Military offices
Preceded by David Odom	Commander of the 2nd Marine Expeditionary Brigade; 2021–2022	Succeeded by Nicholas E. Davis
Preceded by Stephen Jost	Deputy Director for Joint Strategic Planning of the Joint Staff; 2022–2024	Succeeded by ???
Preceded by Farrell J. Sullivan	Commander of the Marine Corps Training Command; 2024–present	Incumbent
