= Julian C. Smith =

United States Marine Corps general

Julian Constable Smith
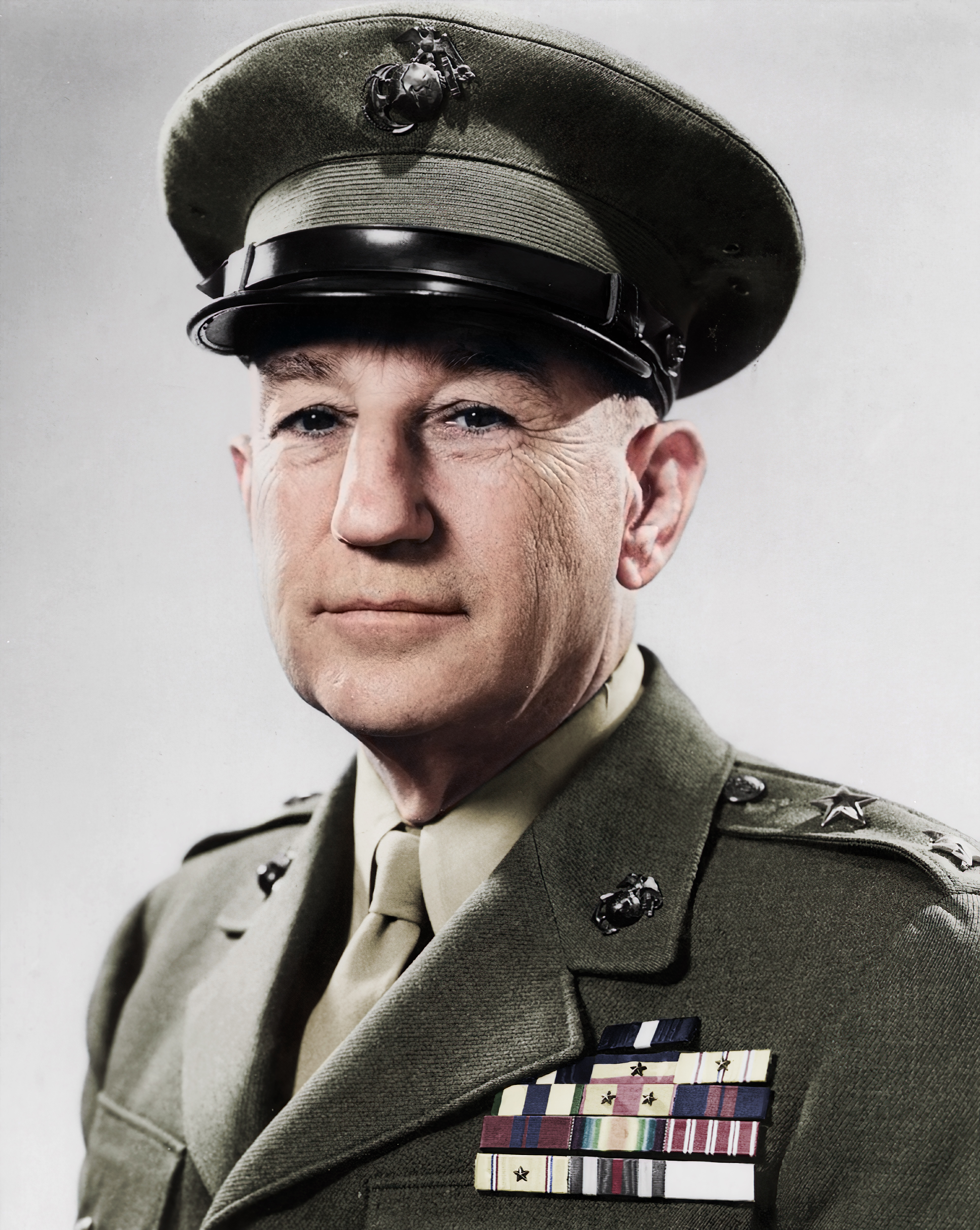
- Julian C. Smith, USMC
- Born: September 11, 1885; Elkton, Maryland, U.S.
- Died: November 5, 1975 (aged 90)
- Military career
- Allegiance: United States
- Branch: United States Marine Corps
- Service years: 1909–1946
- Rank: Lieutenant General
- Commands: 2nd Marine Division; MCRD Parris Island; Department of the Pacific
- Conflicts: Banana Wars; Occupation of Veracruz; Occupation of Nicaragua; World War I; World War II; Battle of Tarawa; Battle of Peleliu
- Awards: Navy Cross; Navy Distinguished Service Medal (2)

Julian Constable Smith (September 11, 1885 – November 5, 1975) was a United States Marine Corps general who served for 37 years, including service in Nicaragua (Navy Cross) and during World War II's Battle of Tarawa (Distinguished Service Medal).

== Biography ==
Smith was born in Elkton, Maryland, on 11 September 1885, and graduated from the University of Delaware. He received his appointment as a second lieutenant in January 1909, and underwent his basic training as a Marine officer at the Marine Barracks, Port Royal, South Carolina. Following his promotion to first lieutenant in September 1912, he was ordered to the Marine barracks at the Philadelphia Navy Yard, and in December of the following year, he was transferred to Panama, remaining there until January 1914. As a member of an expeditionary force, he departed from Panama to take part in the occupation of Vera Cruz, Mexico, from April to December 1914.

Upon returning to the United States, he again was ordered to Philadelphia, this time as a member of the 1st Brigade of Marines. In August 1915, he began a tour of expeditionary duty in Haiti, and in April 1916, was transferred to Santo Domingo with the 2nd Battalion, 1st Regiment, 1st Brigade. In December of the same year, he was ordered back to the Philadelphia Navy Yard, this time, to serve with the Advanced Base Force there.

Following his promotion to captain in March 1917, Smith was ordered to a course of instruction at the Naval War College in Newport, Rhode Island, and several months later he was assigned to Quantico, Virginia, as an instructor in the Marine Officers' Training Camps. In the early part of 1919, he sailed for Cuba in command of a machine gun battalion. After his service there, he returned to the Navy Yard at Philadelphia, and a short time later was transferred to Headquarters Marine Corps, Washington, D.C.

In August 1920, Smith again assumed duties at Quantico, and in July of the following year, he was ordered to sea duty on the staff of the commander, Scouting Fleet. Two years later, he again returned to Washington, this time to serve in the office of the Chief Coordinator, Bureau of the Budget. He left Washington to enter the Army Command and General Staff School, Fort Leavenworth, Kansas, and after graduation in 1928, was again ordered to Marine Corps Headquarters. He captained the Marine Corps Rifle and Pistol Team Squad, for the year of 1928, while detached to temporary duty at Quantico, and also headed the 1930 squad.

Smith's next assignment was with the Marines at Corinto, Nicaragua, where he began a three-year tour of expeditionary duty in August 1930. Following that, he returned to Quantico, where he was appointed to the rank of lieutenant colonel. Then, after another short tour of duty in Philadelphia, he returned to Marine Corps Headquarters for duty with the Division of Operations and Training. With his promotion to colonel, he was named director of personnel.

In June 1938, Smith became commanding officer, 5th Marines, 1st Marine Brigade, at Quantico, where he remained until his promotion to brigadier general. He was then ordered to London, where he served with the Naval Attache, American Embassy, as a naval observer. He returned to the United States in August 1941, and again reported to Quantico. Upon appointment to major general in October 1942, he assumed command of the Fleet Marine Force Training Schools at New River, North Carolina. He took command of the 2nd Marine Division in May 1943 and led the division during the assault on Tarawa. He remained in this capacity until April of the following year, when he was named commanding general, Expeditionary Troops, Third Fleet.

In December 1944, Smith took command of the Department of the Pacific, with headquarters in San Francisco, California. From there, he was ordered to Parris Island, South Carolina, where he commanded the Marine Corps Recruit Depot from February 1946, until his retirement. After his death in November 1975, Smith was buried in Arlington National Cemetery.

== Awards and honors ==
His decorations and medals include:

| Navy Cross | Navy Distinguished Service Medal w/ 1 award star | Navy Presidential Unit Citation w/ 1 service star | Marine Corps Expeditionary Medal w/ 2 service stars |
| Mexican Service Medal | Haitian Campaign Medal (1917) | Dominican Campaign Medal | World War I Victory Medal |
| Nicaraguan Campaign Medal (1933) | American Defense Service Medal w/ Base clasp | American Campaign Medal | Asiatic-Pacific Campaign Medal w/ 2 service stars |
| World War II Victory Medal | Nicaraguan Medal of Distinction w/ Diploma | Dominican Order of Military Merit, First Class w/ White Insignia | Distinguished Service Order |

- Julian C. Smith Hall at Marine Corps Base Camp Lejeune is named after Smith.
- He received a LL.D. degree from the College of California in China at the University of California, Berkeley in January 1945.
