= 2nd Intelligence Battalion =

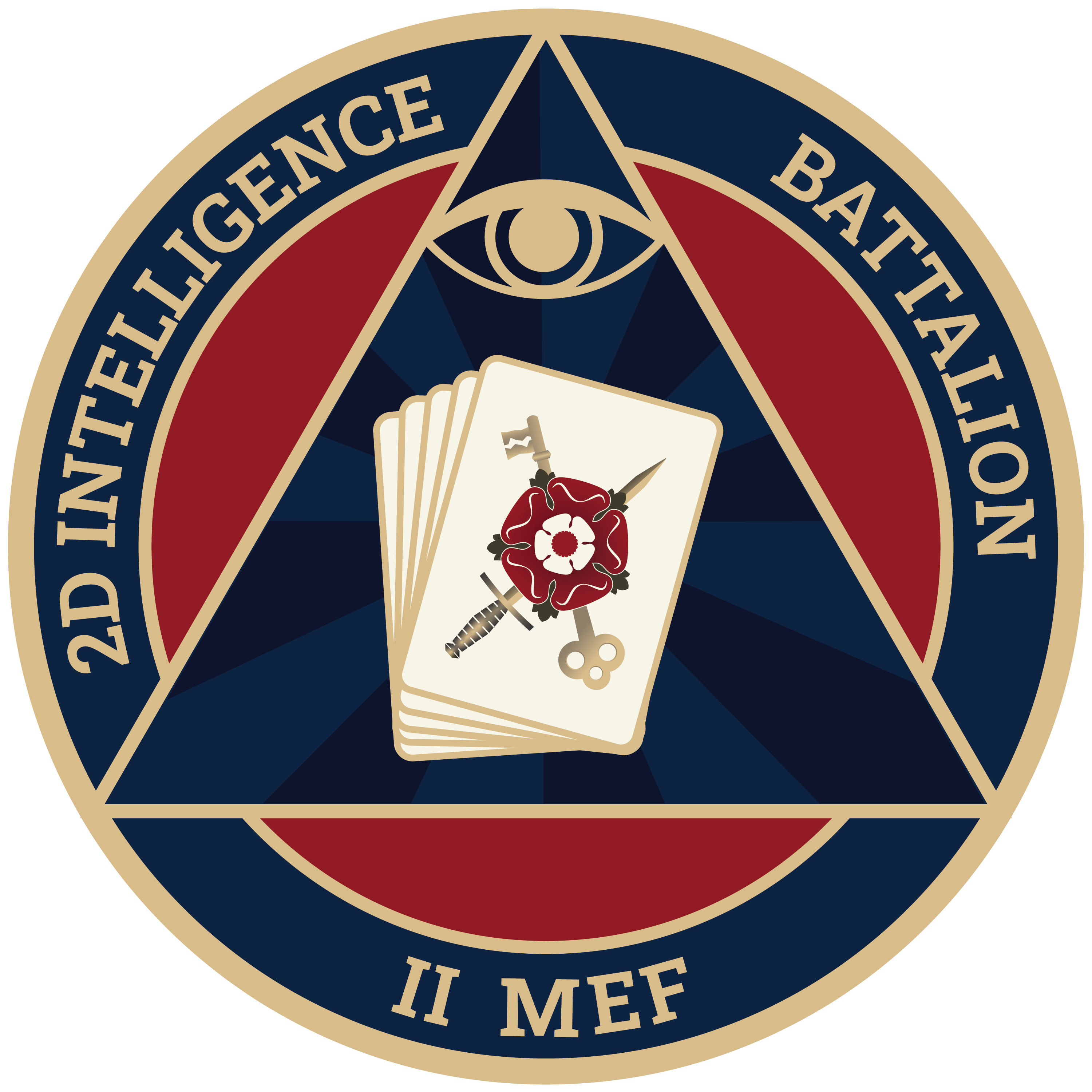
- 2D Intel Insignia
- Active: 1 February 1989 – present
- Country: United States
- Allegiance: United States
- Branch: USMC
- Role: Military intelligence
- Part of: II Marine Expeditionary Force
- Mottos: "Videmus, Audimus, Novimus"
- Engagements: Operation Desert Storm; Operation Enduring Freedom; Operation Iraqi Freedom

Commanders
- Current commander: Lieutenant Colonel Robert J. Epstein

The 2d Intelligence Battalion (2d Intel) is a Marine Corps Intelligence military intelligence and counterintelligence unit based at Marine Corps Base Camp Lejeune. They provide the II Marine Expeditionary Force with intelligence products and analysis.

== Mission ==
Plan and direct, collect, process, produce and disseminate intelligence, and provide counterintelligence support to the MEF Command Element, MEF major subordinate commands, subordinate Marine Air Ground Task Forces (MAGTF), and other commands as directed.

== Subordinate units ==
- Headquarters and Service Company
- Battlefield Surveillance Company
- Direct Support Company
- Intelligence Operations Company
- Counterintelligence Human Intelligence Company

== Unit awards ==
A unit citation or commendation is an award bestowed upon an organization for the action cited. Members of the unit who participated in said actions are allowed to wear on their uniforms the awarded unit citation. 2nd Intel Battalion has been presented with the following awards:

Ribbon	Unit Award
	Navy Unit Commendation
	Meritorious Unit Commendation
	National Defense Service Medal with one Bronze Star
	Armed Forces Expeditionary Medal
	Southwest Asia Service Medal with two Bronze Stars
	Afghanistan Campaign Medal
	Iraq Campaign Medal with one Silver Star
	Global War on Terrorism Expeditionary Medal
	Global War on Terrorism Service Medal

== See also ==
- List of United States Marine Corps battalions
- Organization of the United States Marine Corps
