= 7th Communication Battalion =

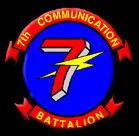
- Battalion insignia
- Active: 1 October 1957 – present
- Country: United States
- Branch: United States Marine Corps
- Type: Communications
- Part of: III Marine Expeditionary Force Headquarters Group
- Engagements: Vietnam War; Operation Desert Shield; Operation Restore Hope

Commanders
- Current commander: Lieutenant Colonel Stephanie A. Mafrici

The 7th Communication Battalion is a communications battalion in the United States Marine Corps.

== Mission ==
7th Communication Battalion will establish, maintain, and defend communication networks and services simultaneously for Marine Air Ground Task Force (MAGTF) command elements (CE), Marine component headquarters, and/or a Combined/Joint Task Force headquarters (C/JTF HQ) in order to facilitate a commander's ability to command and control forces.

== History ==
The 7th Communication Battalion was activated in 1957 at Camp Pendleton, California. Its first deployment of was to Taiwan in 1960, where they spent February–April stationed at Kaohsiung. The 7th was later relocated to the Marine Corps Air Ground Combat Center Twentynine Palms.

The 7th participated in the Vietnam War from 1966 to 1969. They operated first from Da Nang (Hill 34) with elements operating at the Phu Bai Combat Base while assigned to the 1st Marine Division. While in Vietnam, members of the unit were assigned or attached to other USMC units. Wiremen from 7th Communication Battalion incurred particularly high casualties (see declassified log available via web search). Subsequently, they operated out of Da Nang. They were briefly reassigned to Okinawa in late 1969, before returning several months later to Vietnam, and serving there until 1972, except for a short break in late 1971 to early 1972. The 7th Communications Battalion also participated in Operations Eagle Pull and Frequent Wind at the official conclusion of the Vietnam War in April 1975.

=== After Vietnam ===
The 7th were deployed to Thailand in May 1972, until 1973 as part of the 3rd Marine Amphibious Task Force. They participated in minesweeping off the North Vietnam coast in 1973, before aiding in evacuations, and search and rescue in Southeast Asia in 1974–75.

=== 1990s to present ===
The battalion participated in support of Operation Desert Storm in Southwest Asia from December 1990 to April 1991. They also participated in Operation Desert Shield, at around the same time. They participated in Operation Sea Angel in Bangladesh in mid-1991, and also served in Somalia in 1992 and 1993.

== Unit awards ==
A unit citation or commendation is an award bestowed upon an organization for the action cited. Members of the unit who participated in said actions are allowed to wear on their uniforms the awarded unit citation. The 7th Communication Battalion has been presented with the following awards:

Streamer	Award	Year(s)	Additional Info
	Presidential Unit Citation Streamer two Bronze Stars	1966–1967, 1967–1968	Vietnam
	Meritorious Unit Commendation with two Bronze Stars	1968, 2010, 2019-2021	Vietnam
	National Defense Service Streamer with two Bronze Stars	1961–1974, 1990–1995, 2001–2023	Vietnam War, Gulf War, war on terrorism
	Vietnam Service Streamer with one Silver and three Bronze Stars		Chu Lai, Da Nang
	Vietnam Gallantry Cross with Palm Streamer		

== See also ==
- List of United States Marine Corps battalions
- Organization of the United States Marine Corps
