= Robert C. Fulford (general) =

United States Marine Corps general

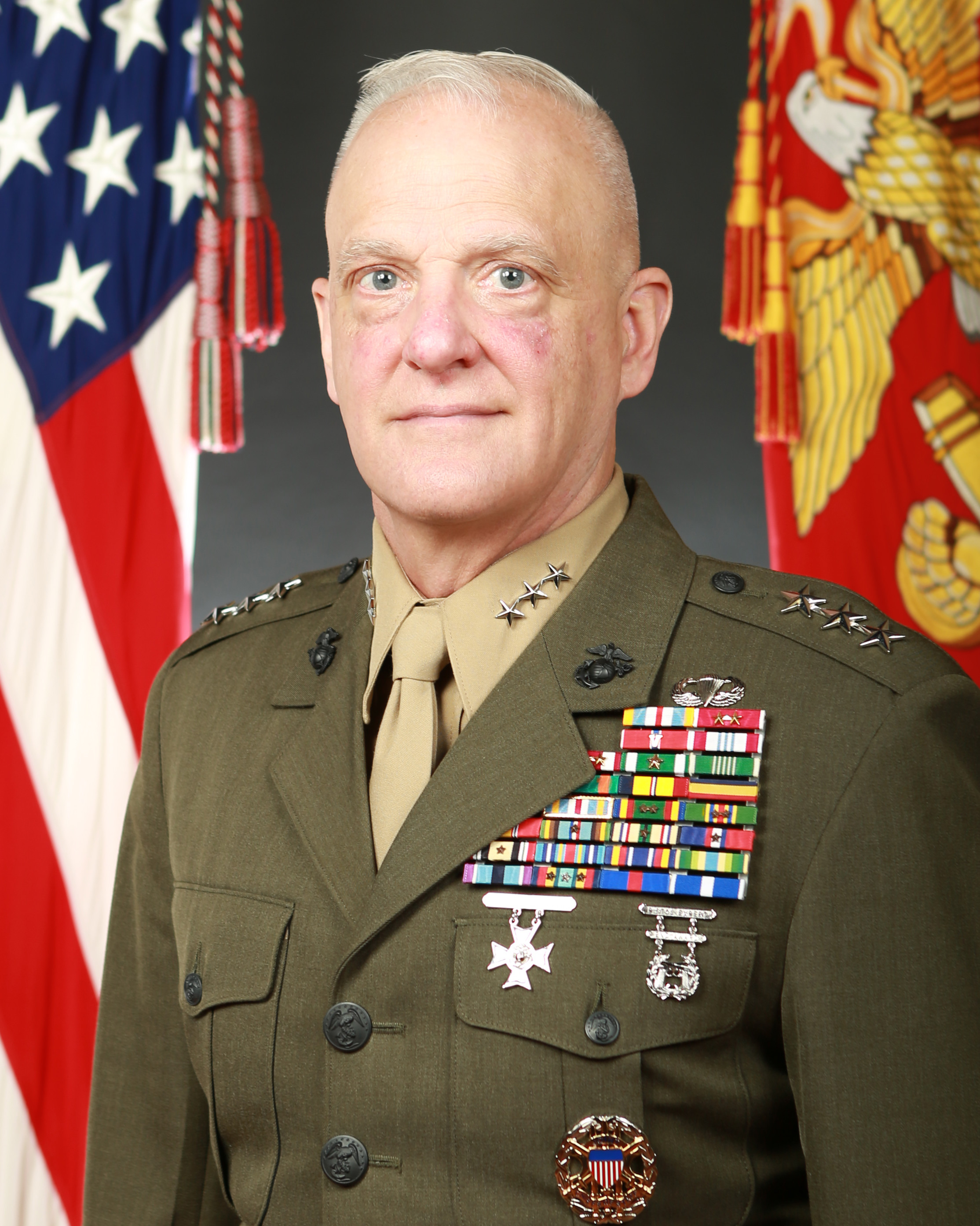
- Relatives: General Carlton W. Fulford Jr. (father)
- Military career
- Allegiance: United States
- Branch: United States Marine Corps
- Service years: 1992–present
- Rank: Lieutenant General
- Commands: II Marine Expeditionary Force 1st Marine Division; 26th Marine Expeditionary Unit Deputy Commanding General, I Marine Expeditionary Force
- Conflicts: Kosovo War; Iraq War
- Awards: Distinguished Service Medal; Defense Superior Service Medal; Legion of Merit; Bronze Star Medal

Lt. Gen. Robert C. Fulford was commissioned in 1992 after graduation from the United States Naval Academy.

== Awards and decorations ==
Fulford has been decorated for service, to include:

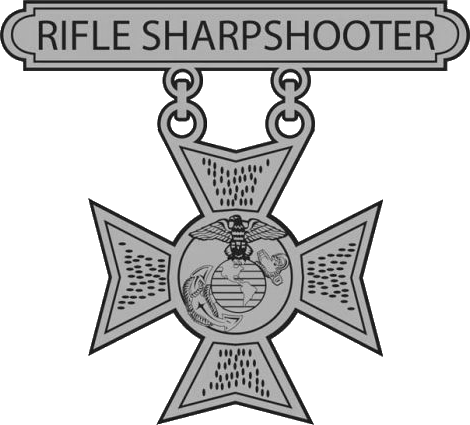

Military Parachutist Insignia
Defense Superior Service Medal
Legion of Merit with two gold award stars	Bronze Star Medal with Combat V	Defense Meritorious Service Medal	Meritorious Service Medal with two gold award stars
Navy Commendation Medal with award star	Army Commendation Medal	Navy Achievement Medal	Combat Action Ribbon
Navy and Marine Corps Presidential Unit Citation	Joint Meritorious Unit Award	Navy Unit Commendation with two bronze service stars	Navy Meritorious Unit Commendation with two bronze service stars
National Defense Service Medal with service star	Armed Forces Expeditionary Medal with service star	Southwest Asia Service Medal with service star	Kosovo Campaign Medal with service star
Iraq Campaign Medal with service star	Global War on Terrorism Expeditionary Medal	Global War on Terrorism Service Medal	Armed Forces Service Medal
Humanitarian Service Medal	Navy and Marine Corps Sea Service Deployment Ribbon with seven bronze service stars	Marine Corps Recruiting Service Ribbon	NATO Medal for Kosovo
Sharpsshooter Rifle Badge		Expert Pistol Badge	

Military offices
Preceded by Calvert L. Worth Jr.	Commanding General of the II Marine Expeditionary Force; 2026–present	Incumbent
