= II Marine Expeditionary Force =

Marine Air-Ground Task Force of the US Marine Corps

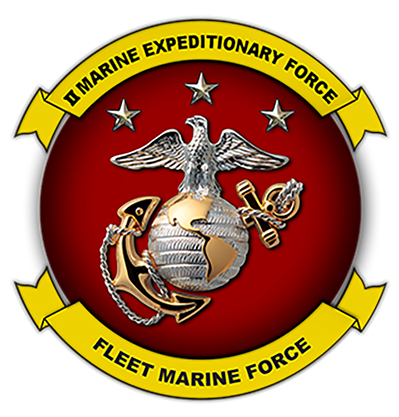
- II MEF insignia
- Founded: 23 October 1962
- Country: United States
- Branch: United States Marine Corps
- Type: Marine Air-Ground Task Force
- Role: Expeditionary combat forces
- Part of: United States Marine Corps Forces Command
- Garrison/HQ: Marine Corps Base Camp Lejeune
- Engagements: Persian Gulf War; Global war on terrorism: War in Afghanistan; Iraq War

Commanders
- Current commander: Lieutenant General Robert C. Fulford
- Command Sergeant Major: Sergeant Major Anthony J. Loftus
- Notable commanders: Alfred M. Gray Jr.

Insignia
NATO Map Symbol
II

The II Marine Expeditionary Force (II MEF) is a Marine Air-Ground Task Force consisting of ground, air and logistics forces capable of projecting offensive combat power ashore while sustaining itself in combat without external assistance for a period of 60 days. The II Marine Expeditionary Force is commanded by a lieutenant general, who serves under U.S. Marine Corps Forces Command, providing Marine fighting formations and units to European Command, Central Command and Southern Command.

== Higher headquarters ==
II MEF falls under the command of U.S. Marine Corps Forces Command (MARFORCOM), and is a service retained force, meaning it is not assigned or allocated to any of the Geographic Combatant Commands. However, II MEF regularly provides subordinate units in support of operations and exercises throughout the U.S. European Command, U.S. Africa Command, and U.S. Southern Command Areas of Responsibility, as well as in support of other U.S. unified and NATO commands. II MEF units are available for and prepared to respond to contingency requirements worldwide.

== Employment ==
In addition to the option of being employed in its entirety as a MEF-sized unit, II MEF has the capability of forming task-organized Marine Air-Ground Task Forces (MAGTF) of lesser size such as a MEF (Forward), a brigade-sized MAGTF (Marine Expeditionary Brigade or "MEB") about one-third the size of a MEF or a Marine Expeditionary Unit (MEU), about one-third the size of a MEB. The size and composition of any MAGTF will be dependent upon the mission assigned. One mission that could be assigned to the MEB would be assignment for planning, deployment and utilization of equipment stored aboard Maritime Prepositioning Ships (MPS). The MPS program involves the forward deployment of the MPS Squadron of four or five ships loaded with a brigade's worth of combat equipment and supplies and the airlifting of the MEB to the designated objective area to link up with the MPS Squadron. At the same time, tactical aircraft of the MEB are flight ferried to an airfield in or near the area of operation. The MEB can be sustained for 30 days by the supplies aboard the ships.

The only routinely deployed MAGTFs, the 22d, 24th and 26th MEUs deploy on a rotating basis to the Mediterranean Sea area to serve as the landing force for the Commander, 6th Fleet. The MEU consists of approximately 2,200 Marines and Sailors, is capable of rapid response in a variety of possible contingencies, and if the situation requires, can serve as the forward element of a larger MAGTF.

== Organization ==
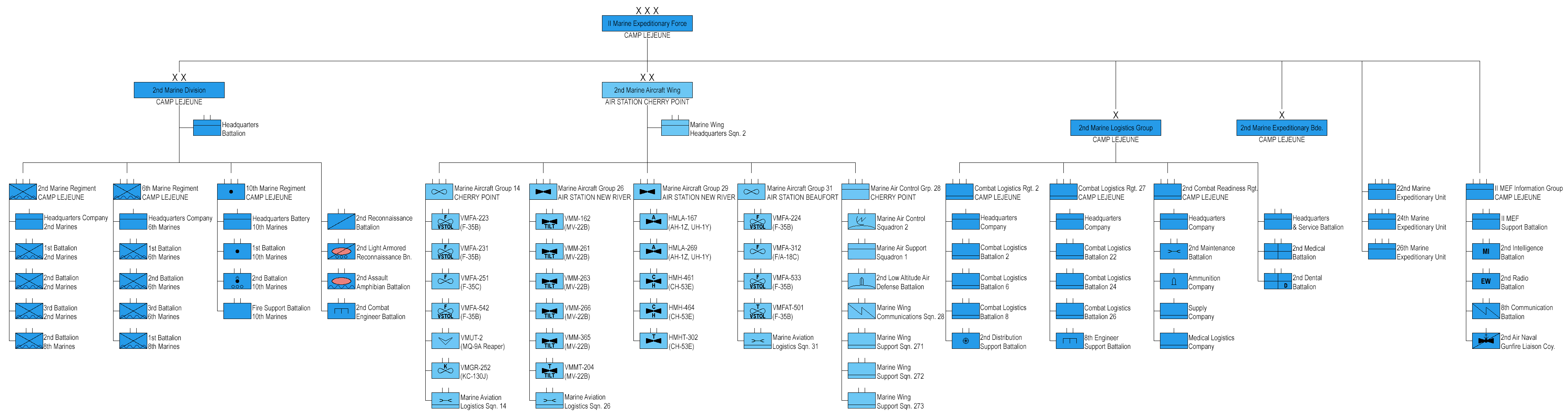
II Marine Expeditionary Force organization as of May 2026 (click to enlarge)

=== Units ===
- Ground combat element: 2nd Marine Division
- Aviation combat element: 2nd Marine Aircraft Wing
- Logistics combat element: 2nd Marine Logistics Group
- Command element: II Marine Expeditionary Force Information Group
  - II MEF Support Battalion
  - 2nd Intelligence Battalion
  - 2nd Radio Battalion
  - 8th Communications Battalion
  - 2nd Air Naval Gunfire Liaison Company (ANGLICO)
- 2nd Marine Expeditionary Brigade
- 22nd Marine Expeditionary Unit
- 24th Marine Expeditionary Unit
- 26th Marine Expeditionary Unit

== List of commanders ==
| No. | Commander | | Term | | | Ref |
| No. | Portrait | Name | Took office | Left office | Term length | Ref |
|---|---|---|---|---|---|---|
| - | Henry P. Osman | Lieutenant General; Henry P. Osman (born 1947) | 12 August 2002 | 23 July 2004 | 1 year, 346 days | - |
| - | James F. Amos | Lieutenant General; James F. Amos (born 1946) | 23 July 2004 | 2 August 2006 | 2 years, 10 days | |
| - | Keith J. Stalder | Lieutenant General; Keith J. Stalder | 2 August 2006 | 25 July 2008 | 1 year, 358 days | |
| - | Dennis Hejlik | Lieutenant General; Dennis Hejlik (born 1947) | 25 July 2008 | 6 August 2010 | 2 years, 12 days | |
| - | John A. Toolan | Major General; John A. Toolan (born 1954); Acting | 6 August 2010 | 18 January 2011 | 165 days | |
| - | John M. Paxton Jr. | Lieutenant General; John M. Paxton Jr. (born 1951) | 18 January 2011 | 13 July 2012 | 1 year, 177 days | |
| - | Raymond C. Fox | Major General; Raymond C. Fox | 13 July 2012 | 17 July 2014 | 2 years, 4 days | |
| - | William D. Beydler | Major General; William D. Beydler | 17 July 2014 | 22 October 2015 | 1 year, 97 days | |
| - | Walter Lee Miller Jr. | Major General; Walter Lee Miller Jr. | 22 October 2015 | 12 May 2017 | 1 year, 202 days | |
| - | Robert F. Hedelund | Lieutenant General; Robert F. Hedelund (born 1961) | 12 May 2017 | 13 July 2019 | 2 years, 62 days | |
| - | Brian Beaudreault | Lieutenant General; Brian Beaudreault (born 1960) | 13 July 2019 | 8 July 2021 | 1 year, 360 days | |
| - | William M. Jurney | Lieutenant General; William M. Jurney | 8 July 2021 | 18 August 2022 | 1 year, 41 days | |
| - | David A. Ottignon | Lieutenant General; David A. Ottignon | 18 August 2022 | 2 August 2024 | 1 year, 350 days | |
| - | Calvert L. Worth Jr. | Lieutenant General; Calvert L. Worth Jr. | 2 August 2024 | 4 August 2026 | 2 years, 2 days | |
| - | Robert C. Fulford | Lieutenant General; Robert C. Fulford | 4 August 2026 | Incumbent | 17 days | |

== See also ==
- Julian C. Smith Hall
