= 2nd Marine Division =

Active United States Marine Corps formation

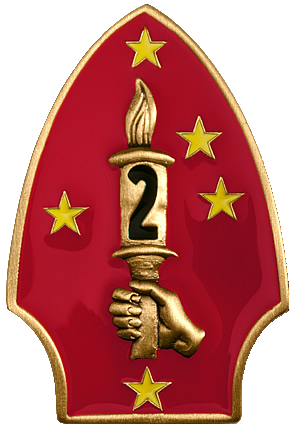
- 2nd Marine Division insignia
- Founded: 1 February 1941 (82 years, 5 months)
- Country: United States
- Branch: United States Marine Corps
- Type: Ground combat element
- Size: Marine Division (approximately 20,000)
- Part of: II Marine Expeditionary Force
- Garrison/HQ: Marine Corps Base Camp Lejeune
- Nickname: The Silent Second
- Motto: Follow Me
- Engagements: World War II; Solomon Islands campaign; Guadalcanal campaign; Gilbert and Marshall Islands campaign; Battle of Tarawa; Mariana and Palau Islands campaign; Battle of Saipan; Battle of Tinian; Volcano and Ryukyu Islands campaign; Battle of Okinawa; Gulf War; Operation Desert Storm; War on terror; Afghanistan; Iraq; Operation Inherent Resolve
- Website: 2ndmardiv.marines.mil

Commanders
- Commanding General: MajGen Farrell J. Sullivan
- Notable commanders: Thomas E. Watson; LeRoy P. Hunt; Clayton Barney Vogel; Randolph M. Pate; James L. Jones; Julian C. Smith; Alphonse DeCarre; Chesty Puller; Alfred M. Gray Jr.

The 2nd Marine Division (2nd MARDIV) is a division of the United States Marine Corps, which forms the ground combat element of the II Marine Expeditionary Force (II MEF). The division is based at Marine Corps Base Camp Lejeune, North Carolina and headquartered at Julian C. Smith Hall.

The 2nd Marine Division earned renown in World War II, distinguishing itself at Guadalcanal, Tarawa, Saipan, Tinian, and Okinawa.

== History ==
=== Pre-World War II ===
The lineal forebear of the 2nd Marine Division is the 2nd Marine Brigade, which was activated on 1 July 1936 at San Diego, California. Subsequently, the brigade was deployed during August–September 1937 to Shanghai, China. The 2nd Marine Brigade relocated during February–April 1938 to San Diego, California.

=== World War II ===
Major General Clayton B. Vogel, its first commander, activated the 2nd Marine Division at a parade and review at the Marine Corps Base, San Diego, California, during a sunny Saturday afternoon of 1 February 1941. The division consisted of the 2nd, 6th, and 8th Marine Regiments (infantry); the 10th Marine Regiment (artillery); engineer, medical, service, and tank battalions; and transport, signal, chemical, and antiaircraft machine gun companies. By mid-1941, because of the growing threat of a German invasion to Iceland, the 6th Marine Regiment, a battalion from 10th Marines and other scattered units were pulled from the division and sent to garrison Reykjavík. After the outbreak of war the 8th Marine Regiment with an assortment of other division assets formed the 2nd Marine Brigade and were dispatched to garrison American Samoa.

During World War II, the 2nd Marine Division (Headquarters) participated in operations in the Pacific Theater of Operations:

- The Guadalcanal campaign, in the Solomon Islands campaign – 4 January to 8 February 1943.
  - 2nd Marines, reinforced:
    Guadalcanal–Tulagi landings, 7 to 9 August 1942;
    capture and defense of Guadalcanal, 10 August 1942 to 31 January 1943.
  - 8th Marines, reinforced:
    capture and defense of Guadalcanal, 2 November 1942 to 8 February 1943.
- The Battle of Tarawa, in the Gilbert Islands campaign – 20 November to 4 December 1943.
- The Battle of Saipan, in the Mariana Islands campaign – 15 June to 24 July 1944.
- The Battle of Tinian – 24 July to 10 August 1944.
- The Battle of Okinawa (floating reserve) – 1 to 10 April 1945.
  - Detachment of Headquarters and the 8th Marines, reinforced – 1 to 30 June 1945.

Elements of the division were part of the occupation of Nagasaki, arriving twenty-five days after the nuclear strike.

The 2nd and 8th Marines (reinforced by other units of the 2nd Marine Division) were awarded the Presidential Unit Citation while attached to the 1st Marine Division from 7 August and 4 November 1942, respectively, for the Guadalcanal operation.

The 2nd Marine Division was awarded the Presidential Unit Citation for Tarawa Atoll, Gilbert Islands, 20–24 November 1943:

For outstanding performance in combat during the seizure and occupation of the Japanese-held Atoll of Tarawa, Gilbert Islands, 20 to 24 November 1943. Forced by the treacherous coral reefs to disembark from their landing craft hundreds of yards off the beach, the Second Marine Division (Reinforced) became a highly vulnerable target for Japanese fire. Dauntlessly advancing in spite of rapidly mounting losses, the Marines fought a gallant battle against crushing odds, clearing the limited beachheads of snipers and machine guns, reducing powerfully fortified enemy positions and completely annihilating the fanatically determined, entrenched Japanese forces. By the successful occupation of Tarawa, the Second Marine Division (Reinforced) has provided forces with highly strategic and important air and land bases from which to continue future operations against the enemy; by the valiant fighting spirit of these men, their heroic fortitude under punishing fire and their relentless perseverance in waging this epic battle in the Central Pacific, they have upheld the finest traditions of the United States Naval Service.

During the war two Seabee battalions were posted to the 2nd. The 18th Naval Construction Battalion (NCB) was assigned to the 18th Marines as the third battalion of the regiment. They received a Presidential Unit Citation for doing Tarawa with the 2nd Marine Division but also did Saipan and Tinian as well. The 18th Marines were inactivated and the Seabees stayed on Tinian to work on the airfield. They were replaced by the 71st NCB for the 2nd's assault on Okinawa.

=== 1950s through the 1980s ===
The Division did not take part in a major action again until 1958 when elements participated in the U.S. intervention into the Lebanon crisis of 1958. 2nd Marine Division units helped to reinforce Guantanamo Bay during the Cuban Missile Crisis in 1962 and landed in the Dominican Republic in 1965 as part of Operation Power Pack. Other peacekeeping operations carried on by the Division include being part of the Multi National Peacekeeping Force in Lebanon from August 1982 until February 1984. The Division suffered the loss of 238 Marines and Sailors during the 1983 Beirut barracks bombing, plus 3 U.S. Army personnel attached to the unit. Towards the end of the 1980s, Division Marines participated in Operation Just Cause, the invasion of Panama.

=== The Gulf War and the 1990s ===
The 1990s began with elements of the Division participating in Operation Sharp Edge, the evacuation of American and allied civilians out of war torn Liberia. This was followed by deployments to Saudi Arabia in support of Operation Desert Shield and then the liberation of Kuwait in Operation Desert Storm. The 2nd Marine Division played a major role repelling the attempted Iraqi invasion of Saudi Arabia which is known as the Battle of Khafji. The 2nd Marine Division faced heavy resistance during the Battle of Kuwait International Airport. Marine Reserve unit Bravo Company, 4th Tank Battalion, 4th Marine division was assigned to the 2nd Marine Division. Bravo Company went on to destroy 59 tanks, 32 APCs, 26 non-armored vehicles, and an artillery gun. Bravo Company destroyed a total of 119 enemy vehicles and took over 800 POWs. The crew of the tank "Stepchild" has the longest confirmed live kill (an Iraqi BMP) by a tank at 3,750 meters (2.33 mi). On the second day of the U.S. advance a platoon from the Marine 8th Battalion destroyed 13 Iraqi tanks in a battle near a defensive position known as the Ice Tray. Marine and Navy air power then inflicted heavy casualties on retreating Iraqi forces leading north out of Kuwait City. The 1st Tank Battalion claimed 50 Iraqi T-55 and T-62 tanks and 25 APCs. The 3rd Battalion claimed 57 T-55s and T-62s (plus 5 T-72s), 7 APCs, and 10 trucks. The 8th Battalion destroyed more than three dozen tanks and a number of other vehicles. On the third and final day of combat the 2nd Marine Division would liberate the city of Al Jahra then would go on to occupy the high ground on the Mutla Ridge cutting off the Iraqi escape route from Kuwait to Basra. Following the war, elements of the Division participated in Operation Provide Comfort.

=== Global war on terror ===
Elements of the 2nd Marine Division deployed to Kuwait in early 2003 to reinforce the 1st Marine Expeditionary Force. These units formed a Marine Expeditionary Brigade (MEB) and were called Task Force Tarawa. Task Force Tarawa crossed into Iraq on the first day of the ground war with the initial task of seizing Jalibah airfield in southern Iraq. Following this, the Task Force pushed north and took part in a major battle in the town of Nasiriyah. After the war, these Marines were moved north to Al Kut where they provided security and stabilization operations in central Iraq.

The 2nd Marine Division deployed to Camp Fallujah, Iraq as the II Marine Expeditionary Force (II MEF) headquarters in January 2005 as part of Operation Iraqi Freedom III (OIF III) (later redesignated OIF 04-06) to relieve the 1st Marine Division in the Al Anbar province. The division again deployed for another year-long tour at Camp Fallujah from 2007 to 2008.

== Organization ==
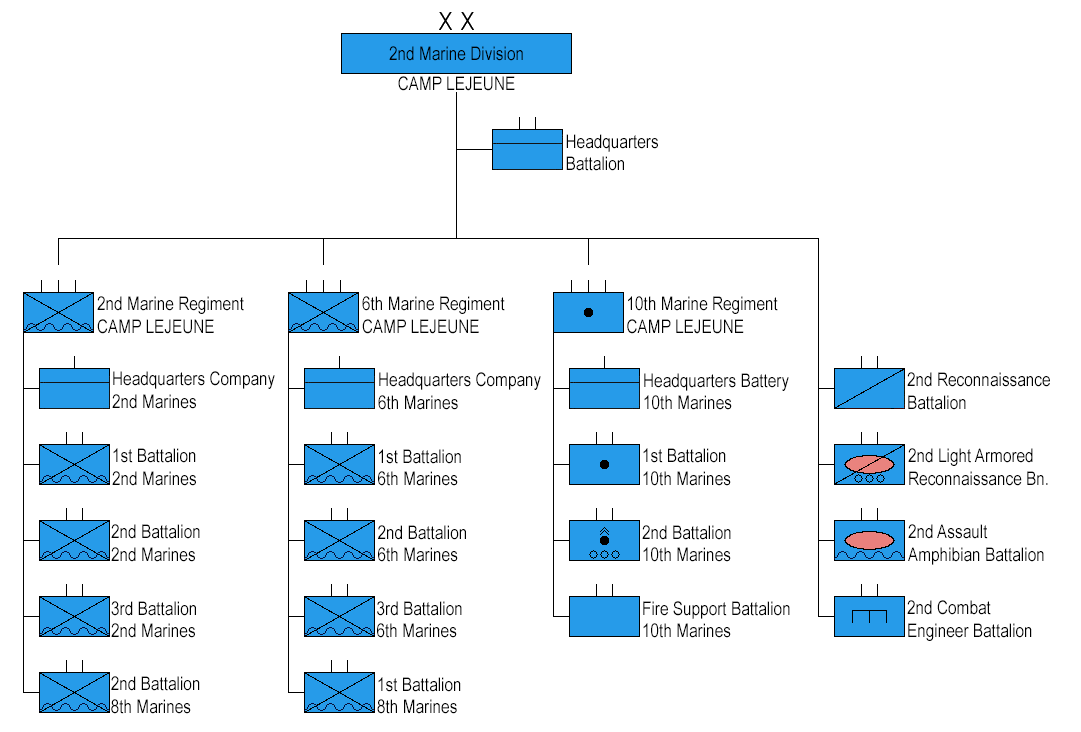
2nd Marine Division organization as of May 2026 (click to enlarge)

As of May 2026, the 2nd Marine Division consists of the following units:

- Headquarters Battalion
- 2nd Marine Regiment
- 6th Marine Regiment
- 10th Marine Regiment
- 2nd Reconnaissance Battalion
- 2nd Light Armored Reconnaissance Battalion
- 2nd Assault Amphibian Battalion
- 2nd Combat Engineer Battalion

== Insignia ==
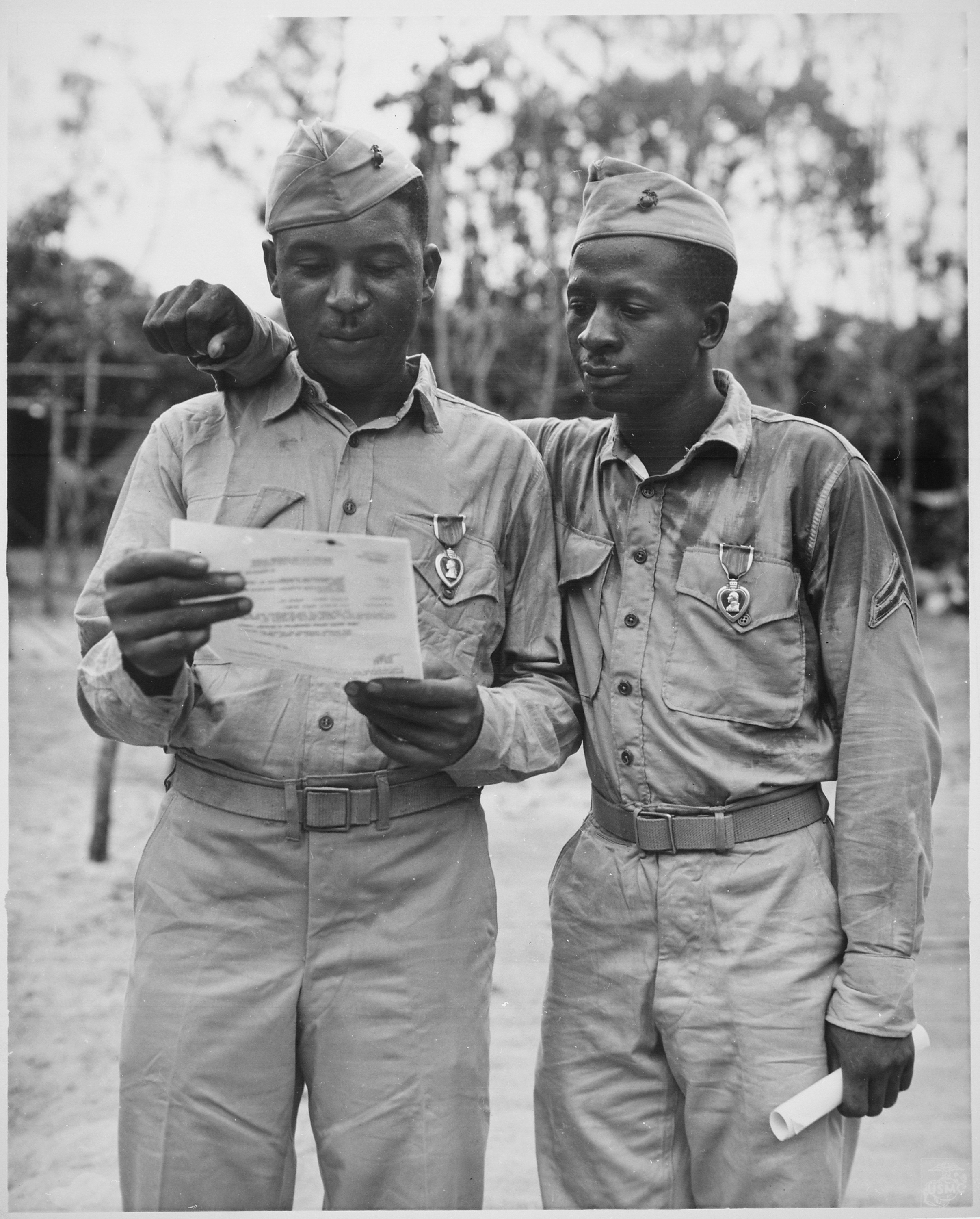
Staff Sergeant Timerlate Kirven (left) and Corporal Samuel J. Love Sr., the first African-American Marines to be decorated with Purple Hearts by the 2nd Marine Division for the battle of Saipan.

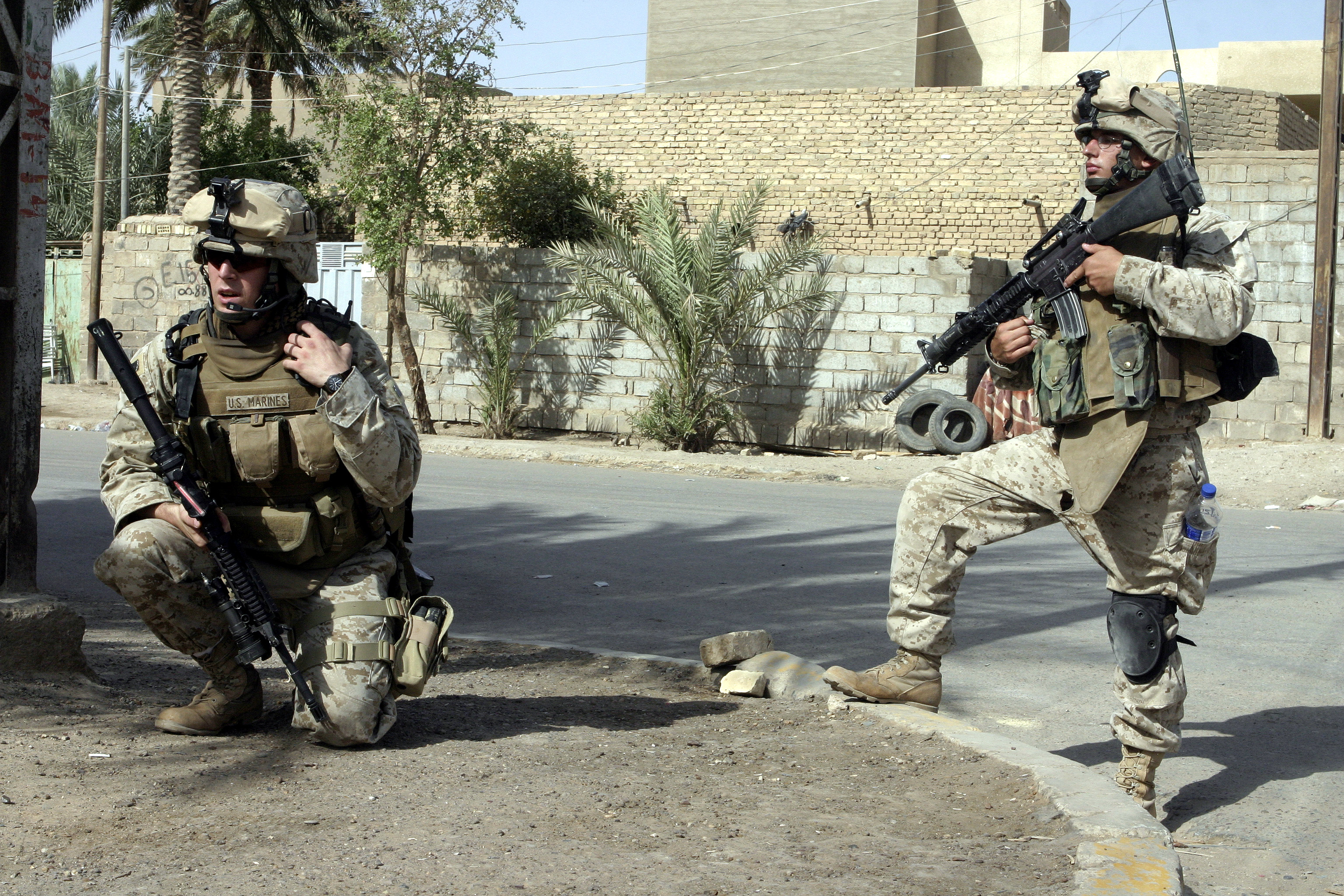
Two Marines from the 1st Battalion, 6th Marine Regiment in Fallujah, Iraq, during July 2005

U.S. Marines with 2nd Tank Battalion, 2nd Marine Division operate M1A1 Abrams tanks during a field exercise on Camp Lejeune, North Carolina

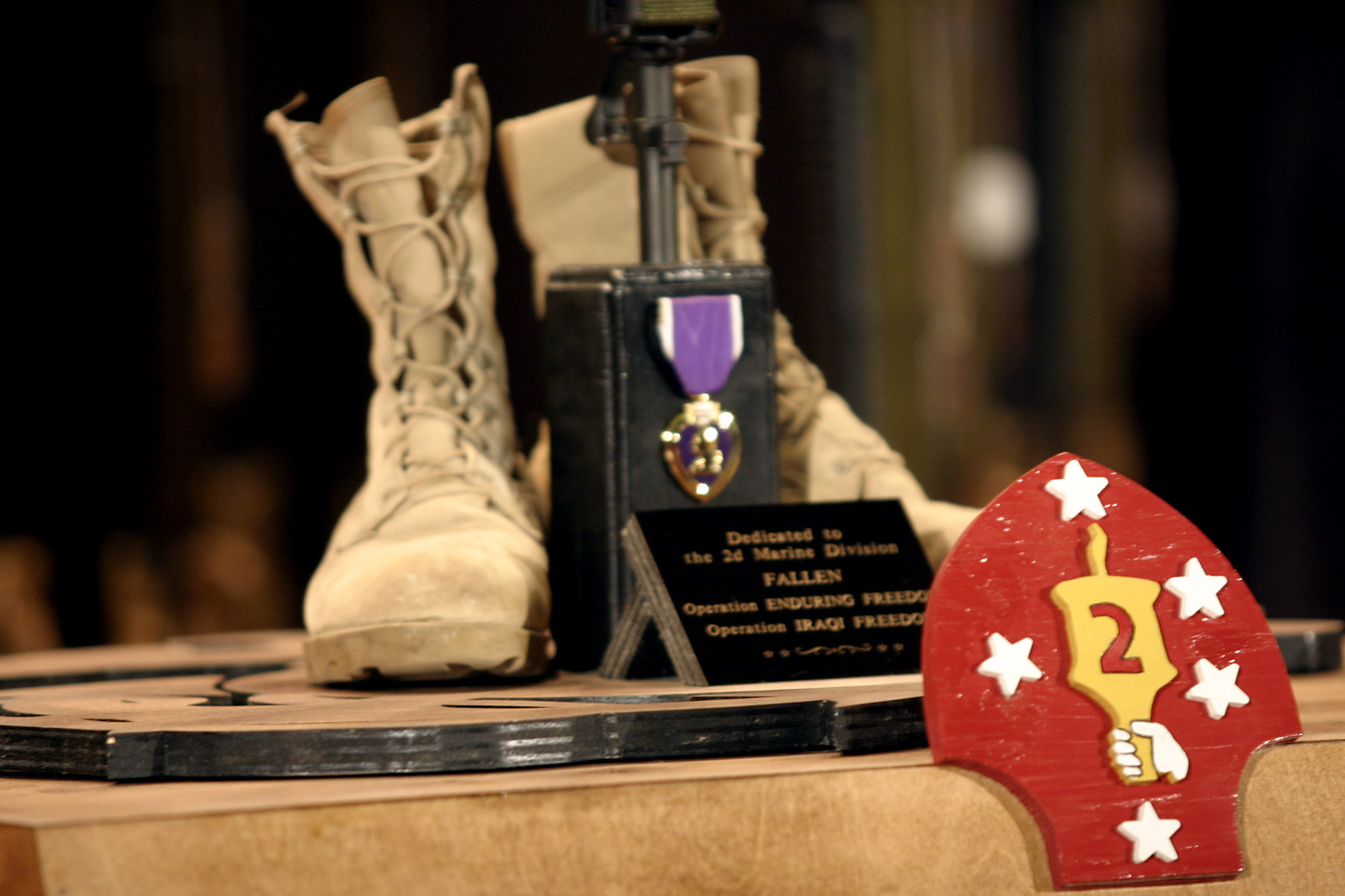
A 2nd Marine Division insignia adorns a memorial at Camp Lejeune

The scarlet and gold spearhead-shaped shoulder patch was designed and authorized in late 1943 for wear by 2nd Marine Division units serving in the Pacific Theater. The patch centers on a hand holding a torch, with the stars of the Southern Cross constellation as a reference to Guadalcanal. Previously a battle blaze similar to the 1st Marine Division's insignia but with the "2" in a form of a snake was worn by veterans of the Guadalcanal campaign.

Although the Marine Corps officially disallowed shoulder patches in 1947, the insignia still appears on buildings, signs, documents, and non-uniform clothing. The insignia of Marine Corps Base Camp Lejeune retains the spearhead shape and general color scheme of the 2nd Marine Division.

== Unit awards ==
A unit citation or commendation is an award bestowed upon an organization for the action cited. Members of the unit who participated in said actions are allowed to wear on their uniforms the awarded unit citation. The 2nd Marine Division has been presented with the following awards:

| Streamer | Award | Year(s) | Additional Info |
|---|---|---|---|
| | Presidential Unit Citation Streamer | 1943 | Tarawa |
| | Navy Unit Commendation Streamer with one Bronze Star | 1990–91, 2007–08 | Southwest Asia, Iraq |
| | Marine Corps Expeditionary Streamer with one Bronze star | | |
| | China Service Streamer | | North China |
| | American Defense Service Streamer with one Bronze Star | 1941 | World War II |
| | Asiatic-Pacific Campaign Streamer with one Silver and two Bronze Stars | | |
| | World War II Victory Streamer | 1941–1945 | Pacific War |
| | Navy Occupation Service Streamer with "ASIA" & "EUROPE" | | |
| | National Defense Service Streamer with three Bronze Stars | 1950–1954, 1961–1974, 1990–1995, 2001–present | Korean War, Vietnam War, Gulf War, war on terrorism |
| | Armed Forces Expeditionary Streamer with three Bronze Stars | | |
| | Southwest Asia Service Streamer with three Bronze Stars | | |
| A multicolored streamer with (from outer to inner) green, red, black (the three colors of the Afghan flag), white, red, and white again horizontal stripes with a blue horizontal stripe in the center | Afghanistan Campaign Streamer with two bronze stars | | |
| | Iraq Campaign Streamer with four bronze stars | | |
| | Global War on Terrorism Expeditionary Streamer | | |
| | Global War on Terrorism Service Streamer | 2001–present | |

== See also ==
- List of 2nd Marine Division Commanders
- List of United States Marine Corps divisions
- Organization of the United States Marine Corps
- 18th Naval Construction Battalion 18th Marine Regiment

== Notes ==
- Col H. Avery Chenoweth (2005) Semper Fi: The Definitive Illustrated History of the U.S. Marines
- M60 vs T-62 Cold War Combatants 1956–92 by Lon Nordeen & David Isby

Bibliography

- Johnston, Richard (1948). Follow Me: The Story of the Second Marine Division in World War II. New York: Random House. ASIN B000WLAD86.

Web

- 2nd Marine Division official website
- 2nd Marine Division Association
- Battle Honors of the Six Marine Divisions in World War II
- Crawford, Danny J.; Robert V. Aquilina; Ann A. Ferrante; Lena M. Kaljot; Shelia P. Gramblin (2001). "The 2d Marine Division and Its Regiments". History & Museums Division. United States Marine Corps. Archived from the original on 11 December 2008.
- World War II Gyrene
- History | History Of Bravo Company 4th Tank Battalion in Desert Storm 1991
