= Task Force Southwest =

- Role: Training
- Website: TF Southwest

Commanders
- Current commander: Brig. Gen. Julian D. Alford (USMC).

Task Force Southwest was established by the United States Marine Corps in 2017 for operations under Operation Freedom's Sentinel in Afghanistan, as part of the Resolute Support Mission.

From October 2017 to April 2018, the 1st Battalion, 24th Marines, conducted base security missions in support of military advisors working with the Afghan National Army.

In April 2018, the United States Army's 1st Battalion, 41st Infantry Regiment, 2nd Infantry Brigade Combat Team, 4th Infantry Division, conducted ground defensive patrols in Helmand Province, Afghanistan, as members of Task Force Southwest to protect the area of operations from enemy operations.
