= John P. Coursey =

American Brigadier general

John Paul Coursey
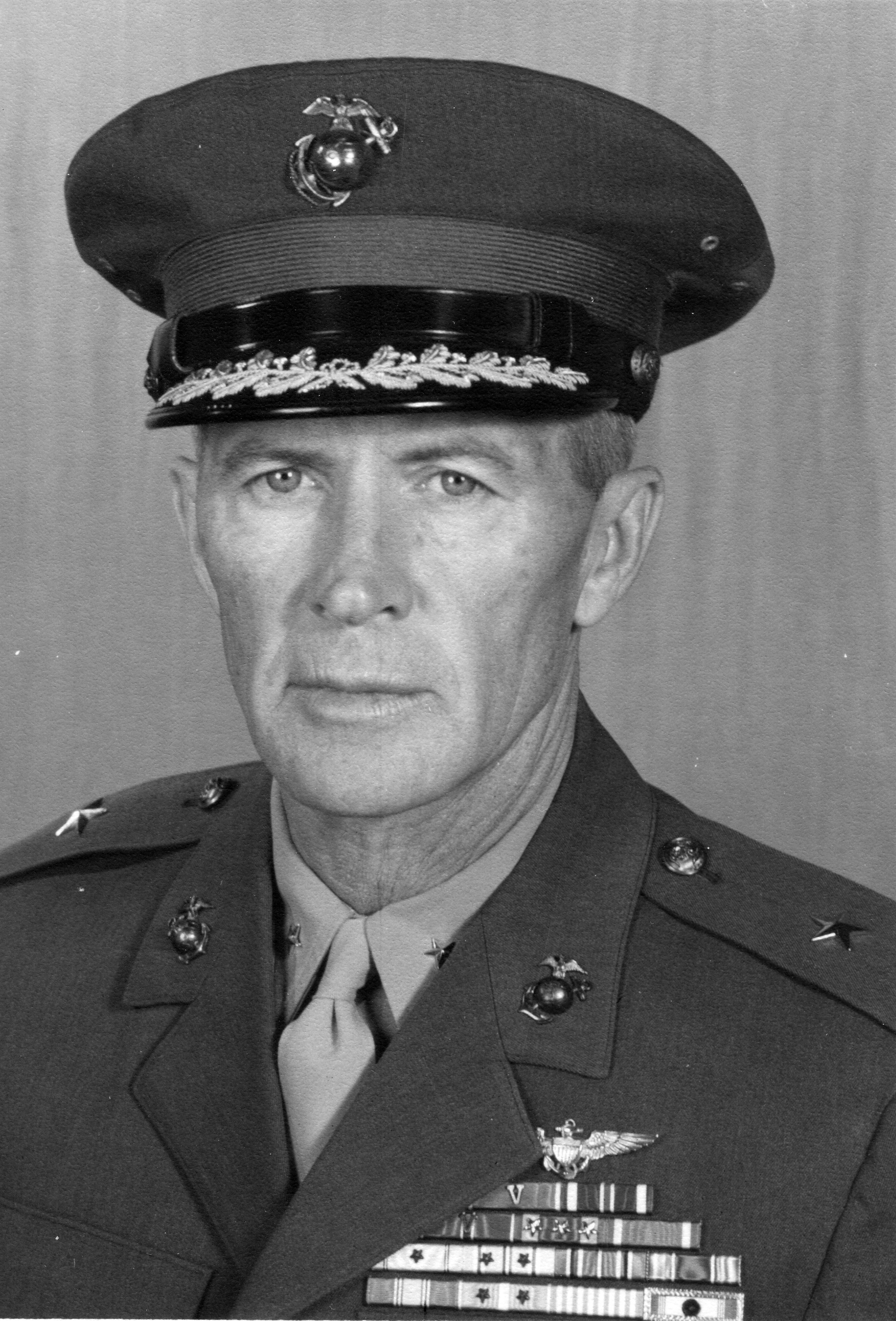
- Coursey as Brigadier general, USMC
- Born: December 20, 1914; Lyons, Georgia, US
- Died: February 27, 1992 (aged 77); Vidalia, Georgia, US
- Military career
- Allegiance: United States
- Branch: United States Marine Corps
- Service years: 1937-1966
- Rank: Brigadier General
- Service number: 0-5617
- Commands: 9th Marine Expeditionary Brigade; Military Secretary to the CMC; MCAS Cherry Point; Marine Transport Squadron 152
- Conflicts: World War II: Attack on Pearl Harbor; Solomon Islands campaign; Korean War: Bombing of North Korea; Vietnam War
- Awards: Legion of Merit (2); Distinguished Flying Cross; Bronze Star Medal; Air Medal (4)

John Paul Coursey (December 20, 1914 – February 27, 1992) was a decorated officer and naval aviator in the United States Marine Corps with the rank of Brigadier General. A survivor of the sinking of battleship Arizona during the Japanese attack on Pearl Harbor, he completed flight training and assumed command of Marine Transport Squadron 152 (VMR-152), operating in the Northern Solomons.

Coursey later served as Executive officer of Marine Aircraft Group 33 in Korea and received several decorations including the Distinguished Flying Cross for his leadership of a flight of Marine jet Grumman F9F Panther fighters in an aerial assault against heavily defended and highly inaccessible enemy positions in close proximity to the Panmunjon restricted area.

He was promoted to the rank of Brigadier General and served as the Assistant Wing Commander, 1st Marine Aircraft Wing at the onset of Vietnam War, before returning to the United States for his final assignment as Assistant Wing Commander, 3rd Marine Aircraft Wing. Coursey retired in November 1966.

== Early career ==
John P. Coursey was born on December 20, 1914, in Lyons, Georgia, as then son of farmer John Asbery Coursey and his wife Adna Bernice Mann. He completed the high school in Mount Vernon, Georgia, in summer 1931 and entered the preparatory school at the Brewton–Parker Institute in Mount Vernon. Coursey later enrolled the University of Michigan at Ann Arbor and graduated in May 1937 with Bachelor of Science degree in Chemistry.

While at the college, Coursey was active in Sigma Chi fraternity; Scabbard and Blade and also was a member of the Reserve Officer Training Corps unit for four years. He reached the rank of Cadet-Major and was commissioned Second lieutenant in Army Reserves in February 1937.

Coursey resigned his Army commission in order to accept an appointment as second lieutenant in the Marine Corps in August 1937 and was ordered to the Basic School at the Philadelphia Navy Yard for officers' instruction. He completed the school in July of the following year and joined the Marine Detachment aboard the battleship Nevada, where he completed the Secondary Battery Gunnery School.

He was then transferred to the battleship Arizona and took part in the fleet exercises off Hawaii. Coursey was ordered to San Diego, California, in July 1939 and joined the staff of the 2nd Marine Brigade under Brigadier general Clayton B. Vogel as Communications officer. While in this capacity, he was promoted to first lieutenant in September 1940 and participated in the transformation of brigade to 2nd Marine Division in February 1941.

== World War II ==
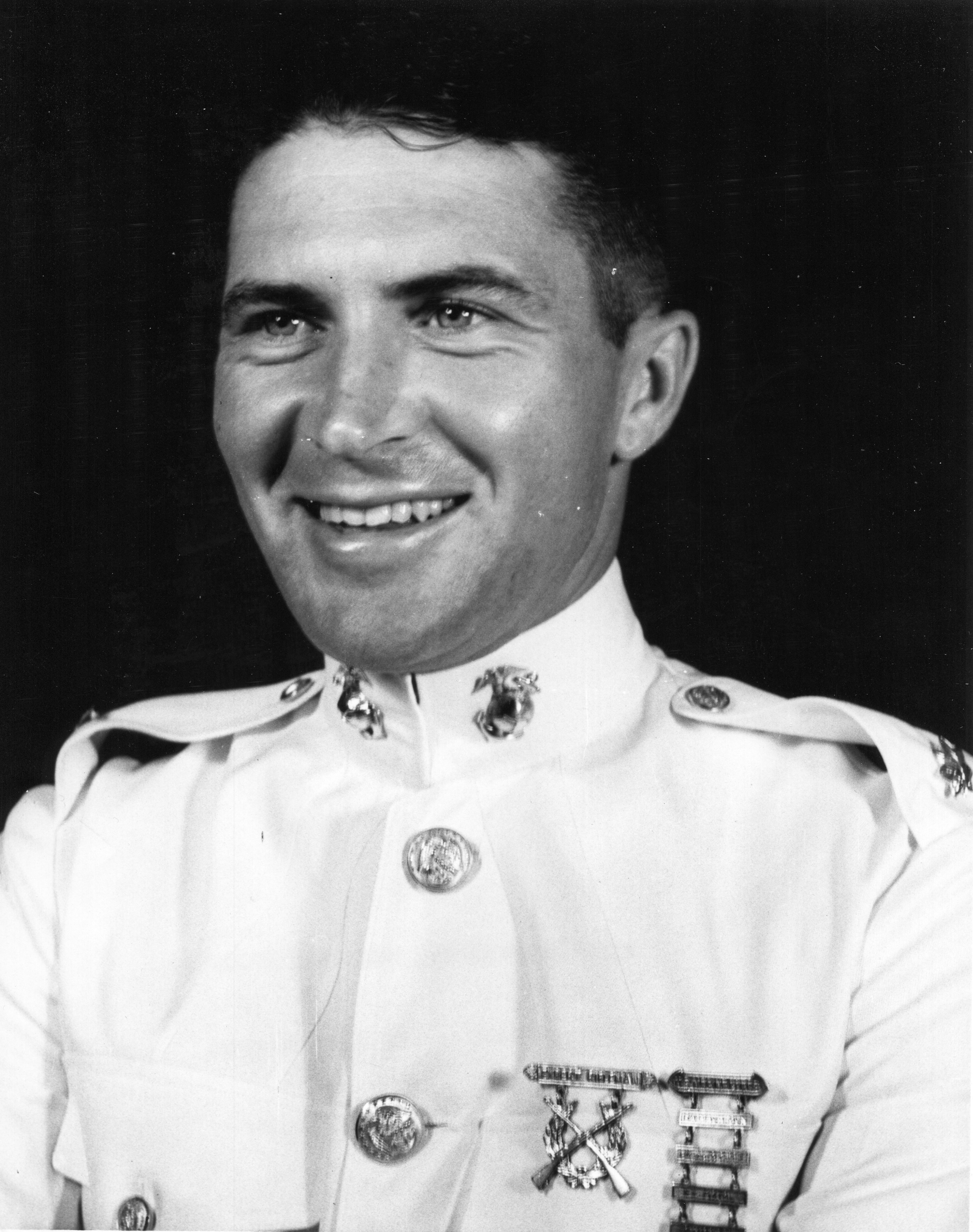
Coursey as Major in August 1943

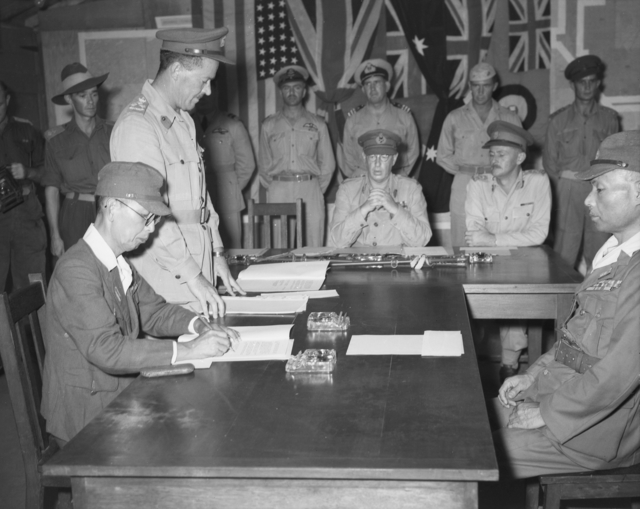
Coursey (standing second from right, back row) looks on, while Japanese general Masatane Kanda signs the surrender document on Bougainville, September 8, 1945.

In May 1941, Coursey rejoined the battleship Arizona, operating with Pacific Fleet and participated in the patrol cruises during the rising tension in Pacific. The battleship Arizona was located on Pearl Harbor during the Japanese Attack on Pearl Harbor on December 7, 1941, and Coursey served as an executive officer of the Marine Detachment aboard under Major Alan Shapley.

The Arizona has been hit by several bombs dropped by Nakajima B5N bombers and her ammo magazines exploded, causing the ship sinking. Coursey was among 335 (of total 1,512 crewmen), who survived the sinking of Arizona and then participated in defense actions of the harbor. Few days following the attack, he was attached to Marine Barracks on Pearl Harbor as Company commander and promoted to captain in February 1942.

Coursey was promoted to temporary rank of Major in August that year and served with Marine Detachment on Midway Atoll, before he was sent back to the United States in November. Coursey requested for flight training and was then ordered to the Naval Air Station Dallas, Texas, and then to the Naval Air Training Center at Naval Air Station Pensacola, Florida.

In May 1943, Coursey was designated naval aviator and was ordered to the Naval Air Station Jacksonville, Florida, for additional operational training, which in January 1944. He then joined the newly activated Marine Transport Squadron 953 at Camp Kearny in San Diego, California, and participated in the initial training of the unit. The squadron was transferred to Marine Corps Air Facility Corvallis, Oregon, in May 1944 and Coursey was promoted to lieutenant colonel at that time.

Following a period of training on Curtiss C-46 Commando planes, Coursey received orders for deployment to the Pacific Theater in October 1944 and joined the headquarters of Marine Aircraft Group 25 attached to 1st Marine Aircraft Wing under Major general Ralph J. Mitchell. Coursey served as Group's executive officer under Colonel Allen C. Koonce until mid-November that year, before assumed command of Marine Transport Squadron 152 (VMR-152), equipped with Douglas C-47 Skytrain planes.

Coursey and his squadron provided air transport of personnel, equipment, and supplies, including aeromedical evacuation during the combats in Northern Solomons campaign, mostly on Bougainville Island. He remained in command of the squadron until the end of war and served as U.S. representative during the surrender of Japanese lieutenant general, Masatane Kanda, Commander of the 17th Army operating on Bougainville on September 8, 1945. For his service with VMR-152, Coursey was decorated with Bronze Star Medal with Combat "V" and also received Air Medal for participating in aerial combat flight.

== Postwar service and Korea ==
Upon the surrender of Japan, Coursey returned to the United States and was ordered to the Marine Command and Staff School at Marine Corps Base Quantico, Virginia, which he completed in February 1946. He was subsequently ordered to Naval Air Station Atlanta, Georgia and assumed command of Marine Air Detachment within local Marine Air Reserve Training Command.

Coursey remained in that assignment until mid-1949, when he was ordered to the Armed Forces Staff College in Norfolk, Virginia, and graduated from the senior course in January 1950. He was then assigned to the Marine Corps Educational Center at Quantico as an instructor in the Aviation Section until he was promoted to Colonel in November 1951 and assumed command of the section.

In July 1952, Coursey was ordered to Korea during the ongoing war there and assumed duty as Executive officer, Marine Aircraft Group 33 under Colonel Louis Robertshaw. His main duty was the coordination of the subordinate units of the command into an efficient combat organization and also maintaining of close and consistent liaison with all echelons and advisement to the Group Commander Robertshaw on every aspect of Group operations against the enemy.

On February 15, 1953, Coursey led a flight of Marine jet Grumman F9F Panther fighters in an aerial assault against heavily defended and highly inaccessible enemy positions in close proximity to the Panmunjon restricted area. He promptly located the carefully camouflaged emplacements in mountainous terrain and initiated a daring low level bombing and strafing attack through intense defensive fire. Despite increasingly heavy anti-aircraft fire and a restricted avenue of approach to the target, he skillfully marked it with direct bomb hits and then led repeated diving assaults that demolished two enemy mortars, seven personnel bunkers and inflicted heavy casualties on the enemy. For his leadership and skills during the assault, Coursey was decorated with the Distinguished Flying Cross.

He remained in Korea until the end of April 1953 and was decorated with Legion of Merit with Combat "V" for his excellent service as Executive officer of the group and also received another three Air Medals for participation in aerial combat flights.

== Later service ==
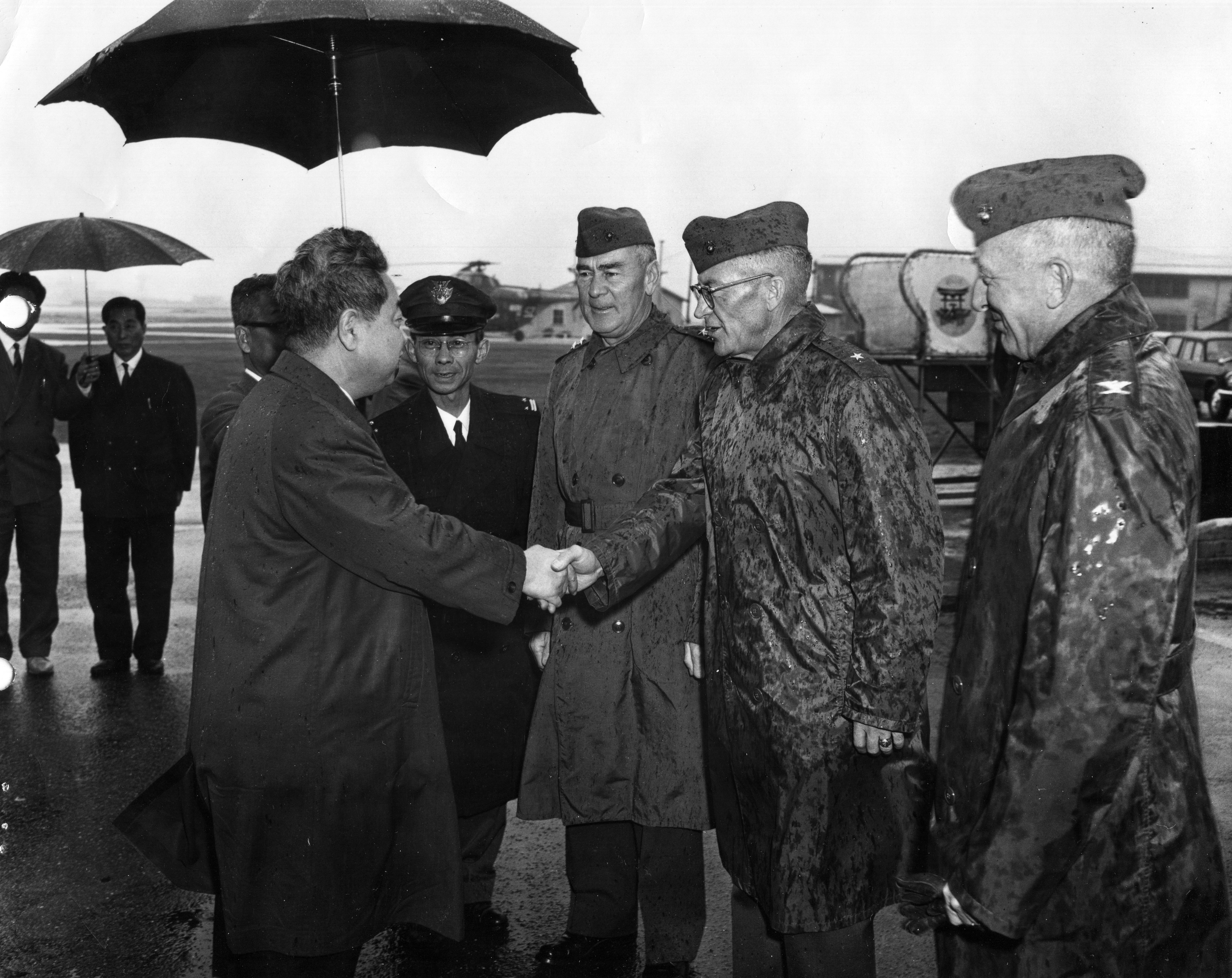
Coursey (second from right) shakes hand with Japanese officials at Iwakuni Air Station, April 1965. Major general Paul J. Fontana is third from right.

Following his return stateside in May 1953, Coursey was ordered to the Maxwell Air Force Base, Alabama, where assumed duty as Instructor and Marine Corps Representative, Naval Advisory Group at local Air War College. He served in this capacity until August 1955, when he entered the senior course at the Air War College and graduated in June 1956. Coursey was subsequently ordered to Hawaii, where he joined the headquarters, Fleet Marine Force, Pacific under lieutenant general Edwin A. Pollock as Deputy Operations Officer (G-3).

In May 1958, Coursey was ordered back to the States and assumed command of Marine Corps Air Station Quantico, Virginia. He remained in that assignment until December 1959, when he was personally selected by new Commandant of the Marine Corps, General David M. Shoup, to be his Military Secretary. In this capacity, Coursey ran the day-to-day operations of the Office of the Commandant, supervised the schedule of the Commandant, and performed other duties as the Commandant may direct. He was promoted to Brigadier general in August 1962.

Upon his promotion to the general's rank, Coursey served for two more months as Military Secretary to the Commandant Shoup, before reported as Assistant Wing Commander, 2nd Marine Aircraft Wing under Major general Richard C. Mangrum at Marine Corps Air Station Cherry Point, North Carolina. Following Mangrum's transfer, Coursey also received new assignment and assumed duty as Commanding general, Marine Corps Air Bases Eastern Area with additional duty as Commander of Cherry Point Air Station.

In March 1964, Coursey was ordered to the Far East and joined the 1st Marine Aircraft Wing at Marine Corps Air Station Iwakuni, Japan. He served as Assistant Wing Commander under Major general Paul J. Fontana. Coursey assumed temporary additional duty as Commanding general, 9th Marine Expeditionary Brigade, which was activated as the combat response force following the Gulf of Tonkin incident. He held that command until the end of January 1965, when he resumed his former duty with 1st Marine Aircraft Wing.

Coursey remained with 1st Marine Aircraft Wing, but following the personnel changes initiated by General William Westmoreland, commander of Military Assistance Command, Vietnam, Coursey, major generals Fontana and William R. Collins were ordered back to the United States in April 1965. Following his return stateside, he was ordered to the Marine Corps Air Station El Toro, California, and assumed duty as Assistant Wing Commander, 3rd Marine Aircraft Wing under Major general Frederick E. Leek.

While in this capacity, Coursey was co-responsible for the training of replacement personnel for combat units deployed in South Vietnam and he personally administered the planning for and formation of a Helicopter Training Group. He also directed of the 3rd Marine Aircraft Wing's KC-130 training and utilization program. For his service in that capacity, Coursey was decorated with his second Legion of Merit.

== Retirement ==
Coursey served in this capacity until November 1, 1966, when he retired from the Marines, after 29 years of active service. He settled in Vidalia, Georgia, and died there on February 27, 1992, aged 77. Coursey was buried at Pinecrest Cemetery & Mausoleum in Vidalia beside his wife, Mary C. Chapman. They had together one son, John Paul Jr., who also served with the Marines in Vietnam and retired as captain, and one daughter, Martha Coursey Shepherd.

== Decorations ==
Brigadier general Coursey's personal decorations include:

Naval Aviator Badge
1st Row	Legion of Merit with Combat "V" and one 5/16" Gold Star			
2nd Row	Distinguished Flying Cross	Bronze Star Medal with Combat "V"	Air Medal with three 5/16" Gold Stars	Navy Unit Commendation
3rd Row	American Defense Service Medal with Fleet Clasp	Asiatic-Pacific Campaign Medal with two 3/16 inch service stars	American Campaign Medal	World War II Victory Medal
4th Row	National Defense Service Medal with one service star	Korean Service Medal with two 3/16 inch service stars	United Nations Korea Medal	Republic of Korea Presidential Unit Citation

== See also ==
- 9th Marine Expeditionary Brigade (United States)

Military offices
Preceded by Roy L. Kline	Military Secretary to the Commandant of the Marine Corps; January 1960 - October 1962	Succeeded by Oscar T. Jensen Jr.
