= John C. Miller Jr. =

U.S. Marine Corps Brigadier General (1912–2000)

John Carroll Miller Jr.
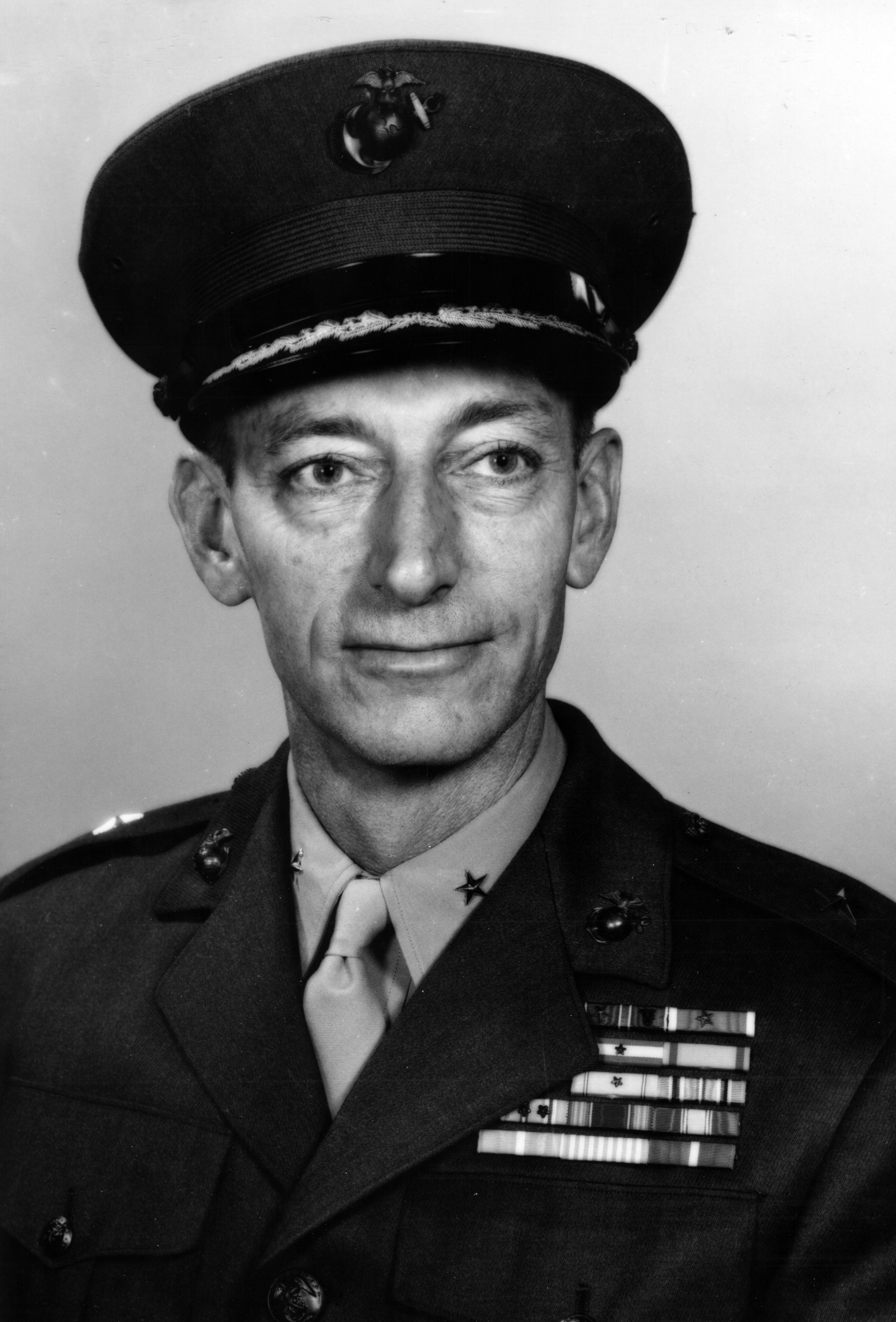
- BG John C. Miller Jr., USMC
- Born: December 25, 1912; Lake Andes, South Dakota, U.S.
- Died: July 29, 2000 (aged 87); San Diego, California, U.S.
- Burial place: Arlington National Cemetery
- Military career
- Allegiance: United States
- Branch: United States Marine Corps
- Service years: 1935–1965
- Rank: Brigadier general
- Service number: 0-5196
- Commands: Landing Force Training Command, Atlantic; 4th Marine Regiment; 3rd Battalion, 5th Marines; 3rd Battalion, 8th Marines
- Conflicts: Yangtze Patrol; World War II: Attack on Pearl Harbor; Battle of Saipan; Philippines campaign; Battle of Okinawa; Korean War
- Awards: Legion of Merit; Bronze Star Medal (2); Purple Heart (2)

John Carroll Miller Jr. (December 25, 1912 – July 29, 2000) was a decorated officer in the United States Marine Corps with the rank of brigadier general. A veteran of the Pacific War, he was wounded twice and received decorations for valor on Saipan and Okinawa. He remained in the Marines and retired as Brigadier general and Commanding general, Landing Force Training Command, Atlantic.

== Early career ==
John C. Miller Jr. was born on Christmas Day 1912 at Lake Andes, South Dakota, the son of John C. Miller and Hazel Peck. He graduated from high school there in summer 1931 and entered the University of South Dakota in Vermillion, South Dakota. While at the University, Miller was a member of the Reserve Officers' Training Corps.

He graduated with a bachelor's degree in June 1935 and was commissioned as a second lieutenant of Infantry in the United States Army Reserve. Miller resigned his reserve commission in order to accept appointment as a second lieutenant in the United States Marine Corps on September 10, 1935. He was subsequently ordered to the Basic School at the Philadelphia Navy Yard for basic officer training and was a member of the largest Basic School class to that date.

This class provided two future Marine Corps Commandants (Leonard F. Chapman Jr. and Robert E. Cushman Jr.), five lieutenant generals (Lewis J. Fields, Frederick E. Leek, Herman Nickerson Jr., William J. Van Ryzin, Richard G. Weede), five major generals (William R. Collins, William T. Fairbourn, Bruno Hochmuth, Raymond L. Murray, Carey A. Randall) and six brigadier generals (William W. Buchanan, Odell M. Conoley, Frederick P. Henderson, Roy L. Kline, Miller Jr. and Thomas F. Riley).

Miller completed the school in May 1936 and was attached to the Marine Detachment aboard the battleship USS New Mexico. He participated in the patrol cruises to Hawaii until August 1937, when he was ordered to China for duty with the 6th Marine Regiment stationed as the part of Brigadier General John C. Beaumont's 2nd Marine Brigade at Shanghai International Settlement. He served in Shanghai during the outbreak of hostilities between China and Japan and returned with his regiment to the United States in April 1938.

He was then stationed at Marine Barracks, San Diego and received a promotion to first lieutenant in October 1938. Miller was transferred to the Marine Barracks at Mare Island Navy Yard in May 1939 and assumed command of local barracks Marine Detachment in October that year. While in this capacity, he also saw temporary additional duty at the receiving ship, San Francisco, California in connection with Western Division Rifle and Pistol Matches.

== World War II ==
With the increasing danger of Japanese expansion in the Pacific during 1939, chairman of Navy's Special Board, Admiral Arthur J. Hepburn, recommended the activation of Marine defense battalions. These special Marine units were designated the defense force of the Pacific naval bases and should be placed on Midway Atoll, Wake Island, Johnston Atoll and Palmyra Atoll.

In August 1940, Miller joined the 1st Defense Battalion under Lieutenant Colonel Bertram A. Bone in San Diego and embarked for Pearl Harbor in February 1941, where he was promoted to Captain in November that year. Single detachments of the battalion were emplaced on Midway, Wake, Johnston and Palmyra Atolls.

During the Japanese attack on Pearl Harbor on December 7, 1941, Miller participated in the defense of the harbor and later commanded 5"/51 caliber gun detachment at Palmyra Atoll. While there, he was promoted to Major in May 1942.

Miller was ordered to Johnston Atoll in February 1943 and joined the newly established 16th Defense Battalion under Lieutenant Colonel Richard P. Ross. He assumed duty as Executive officer of the battalion and was promoted to lieutenant colonel in July that year. He was ordered to San Diego, California one month later and assumed duty as Area Ordnance Officer, Fleet Marine Force, San Diego area under Major General Clayton B. Vogel.

He was responsible for the supplying of units in San Diego with weapons and ammunition, including their procurement and maintenance until February 1944, when he was ordered back to Hawaii for duty as Commanding officer, 3rd Battalion, 8th Marines attached to 2nd Marine Division under Major General Thomas E. Watson.

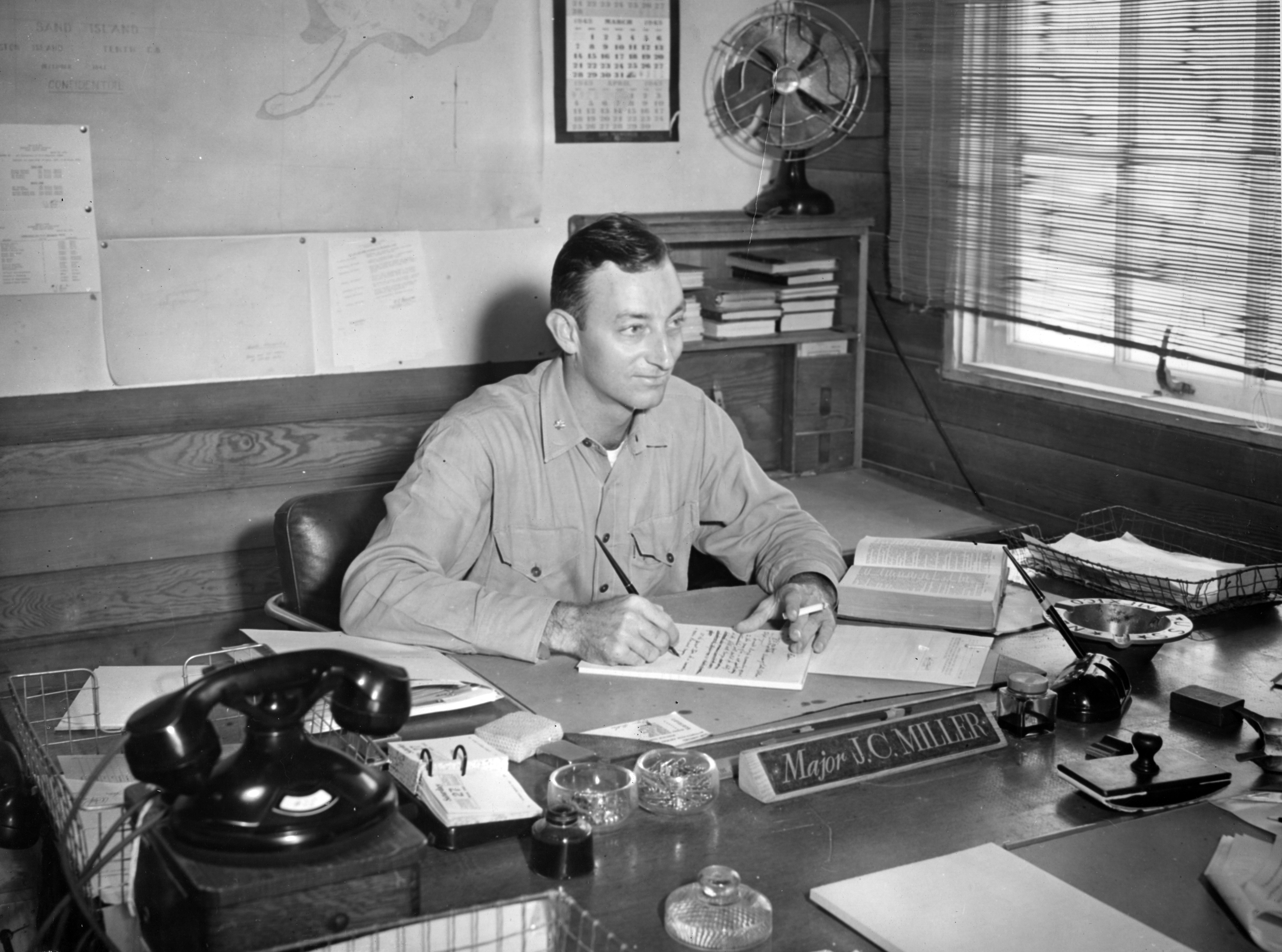
Miller as Executive officer, 16th Defense Battalion at his desk somewhere in Pacific

After a period of heavy fighting on Tarawa in the Gilbert Islands in November 1943, the 8th Marine Regiment under Lieutenant Colonel John H. Griebel needed rest and refit. Miller spent four months with the intensive training in the mountainous area between the great volcanoes of Mauna Kea and Mauna Loa and finally embarked with his battalion for Saipan in late May 1944.

Miller took part in the main landing on June 15, 1944 and was badly wounded by mortar fragments during the approach to the beach. He remained in command of his battalion and directed operation of his battalion until he was wounded again and ordered to the rear by his superior officer. For his leadership on Saipan, Miller was decorated with a Bronze Star Medal with Combat "V" and two awards of the Purple Heart for wounds.

He was hospitalized at Naval Hospital, San Diego until January 1945, when he was declared fit for duty and embarked again for Pacific area. Miller joined 5th Marine Regiment under his old superior officer, now Colonel John H. Griebel, who received his new command following promotion. He served as Regimental operations officer during the period of intensive training at Pavuvu Island, Russell Islands, where 5th Marine Regiment was stationed for rest and refit after heavy fighting on Peleliu during September–October 1944. The situation similar with that one with 8th Marines on Hawaii back in early 1944.

Shortly thereafter, Miller was attached as an observer to the Army's 7th Infantry Division under Major General Archibald V. Arnold and participated in combat in the Philippines and Okinawa. While on Okinawa, he rejoined 5th Marine Regiment on April 4, 1945, when commanding officer of 3rd Battalion, Major John H. Gustafson, was wounded in action and Colonel Griebel needed replacement.

Miller assumed temporary command of the battalion and participated in heavy combat in the Awacha pocket, a Japanese stronghold built into a maze of clifflike ridges and tangled gorges. After repeated Marine attacks with the support of Air, Artillery, tank and naval gunfire support, the Japanese resistance was crushed on May 15, 1945. For his service on Okinawa, Miller received his second Bronze Star Medal. He was subsequently relieved and returned to the United States.

== Postwar service ==
After a two-month leave, Miller was ordered to the Marine Corps Schools, Quantico, Virginia, where he entered the Command and Staff Course, which he completed in February 1946. He then assumed duty as an Instructor in the Senior Course at the Amphibious Warfare School and remained in that assignment until June 1948.

Miller was subsequently ordered to Camp Pendleton, California, where he joined the staff of 1st Marine Division under Major General Graves B. ERskine and served for two years as Assistant Chief of Staff for Operations and Training. He was ordered to the Panama Canal Zone in July 1950 and served as Executive Officer of the Marine Barracks, 15th Naval District under Rear Admiral Albert M. Bledsoe until February 1951.

Upon his return stateside, Miller was promoted to Colonel and attached to the Troop Training Unit, Amphibious Training Command, Pacific Fleet at Coronado, California. He served consecutively as Director of Training under Brigadier Generals John T. Selden, William W. Davies and Lewis Burwell Chesty Puller and also saw temporary duty in Japan in 1952 as Chief of Troop Training Team, Amphibious Force, Far East during the Korean War.

In July 1953, Miller was sent back to Camp Pendleton for duty as Chief of Staff, 3rd Marine Division under Major General Robert H. Pepper and embarked for Japan the following month as Chief of Staff of the 3rd Marine Division Advance Echelon. He was appointed Commanding officer of 3rd Marine Division's 4th Marine Regiment stationed at Camp Nara, Honshu in October 1953. His regiment served as a garrison force in Japan and its assigned mission was that of sharing in the defense responsibilities for southern Honshu and of being ready for rapid transfer to potential hot spots in the Far East. Miller was appointed Divisional Assistant Chief of Staff for Logistics in April 1954.

During August that year, General Pepper was promoted to lieutenant general and appointed Commanding general, Fleet Marine Force, Pacific with headquarters on Pearl Harbor, Hawaii. Miller followed him as his Assistant Chief of Staff for Operations and Training and served in this capacity also under Pepper's successor, Lieutenant General William O. Brice. Miller was transferred to the Marine Corps Base Quantico, Virginia in July 1956 and assumed duty as a member of the Advanced Research Group, tasked with the development of recommendations on how the Marine air-ground task force should evolve structurally to meet the challenges of atomic warfare and new technologies such as helicopters and jet aircraft.

In July 1957, Miller was ordered to London, England and assumed duty as Force Marine Officer on the staff of the Commander-in-Chief, U.S. Naval Forces, Eastern Atlantic and Mediterranean under Admiral James L. Holloway Jr. He served in this capacity during the Lebanon Crisis, a threat of a civil war between Maronite Christians and Muslims and also held additional duty as Senior Marine Officer on the staff of the Commander-in-Chief, U.S. Specified Command, Middle East.

He returned to Quantico in July 1959 and assumed duty as Deputy Director, Marine Corps Educational Center within the Marine Corps Schools, Quantico under Lieutenant General Merrill B. Twining. Miller was appointed Director of the Center in November that year and promoted to the rank of brigadier general on January 1, 1960. His main responsibility was the Education of Marine Corps officers at each stage of officer's career. The Marine Corps Educational Center consisted of four resident schools and one correspondence or extension school. These are known as the Basic School focused on basic training for newly commissioned officers; Junior School for second and first lieutenants; Senior School for Captain and above; Communication Officers School trained selected junior officers in the operational aspects of communications; and Extension School prepared and administered correspondence courses that parallel resident instruction.

In September 1961, he was appointed Director of the Marine Corps Landing Force Development Center at Quantico, which was focused on the development and testing of new tactics, equipment and techniques. Miller held that command until June 1962, when he was ordered to Norfolk Navy Yard for duty as Commanding General, Landing Force Training Unit, Atlantic.

While in this capacity, Miller's command trained over 46,000 officers and men of the U.S. Military services and over 1,000 members of the armed forces of friendly foreign nations were trained in the various aspects of landing force operations related to amphibious assault. He also held additional duty as Commander, Amphibious Training Command, Atlantic Fleet and served as the director of the control group during exercise Steel Pike I, then the largest peacetime amphibious exercise ever conducted with more than 55,000 U.S. Navy and Marine Corps personnel, 1,800 Spanish Marines, and 141 ships participating.

Miller served at Norfolk until April 1, 1965, when he retired from active duty after 30 years of commissioned service. For his service as Commanding general, Landing Force Training Unit, Atlantic, he was decorated with Legion of Merit.

== Retirement ==
Following his retirement from the Marine Corps, Miller settled on Oahu, Hawaii and remained there until summer of 2000, when he was ordered to the Naval Hospital, San Diego, California for treatment. He died there on July 29, 2000, aged 87, and was buried with full military honors at Arlington National Cemetery, Virginia. Miller was married to Margaret Pohlman and had two daughters Susan Hawkins and Jane Moritz.

== Decorations ==
Here is the ribbon bar of Brigadier General Miller:

1st Row	Legion of Merit		
2nd Row	Bronze Star Medal with Combat "V" and one 5/16" Gold Star	Purple Heart with one 5/16" Gold Star	Navy Presidential Unit Citation with one star
3rd Row	China Service Medal	American Defense Service Medal with Base Clasp	American Campaign Medal
4th Row	Asiatic-Pacific Campaign Medal with three 3/16 inch service stars	World War II Victory Medal	National Defense Service Medal with one star
5th Row	Korean Service Medal	United Nations Korea Medal	Philippine Liberation Medal

== See also ==
- Marine defense battalions
- Battle of Okinawa

Military offices
Preceded by Austin R. Brunelli	Commanding general, Landing Force Training Command, Atlantic; July 1, 1962 - April 1, 1965	Succeeded by Gordon D. Gayle
