= Roy L. Kline =

American Brigadier general (1914–2020)

Roy Lewis Kline
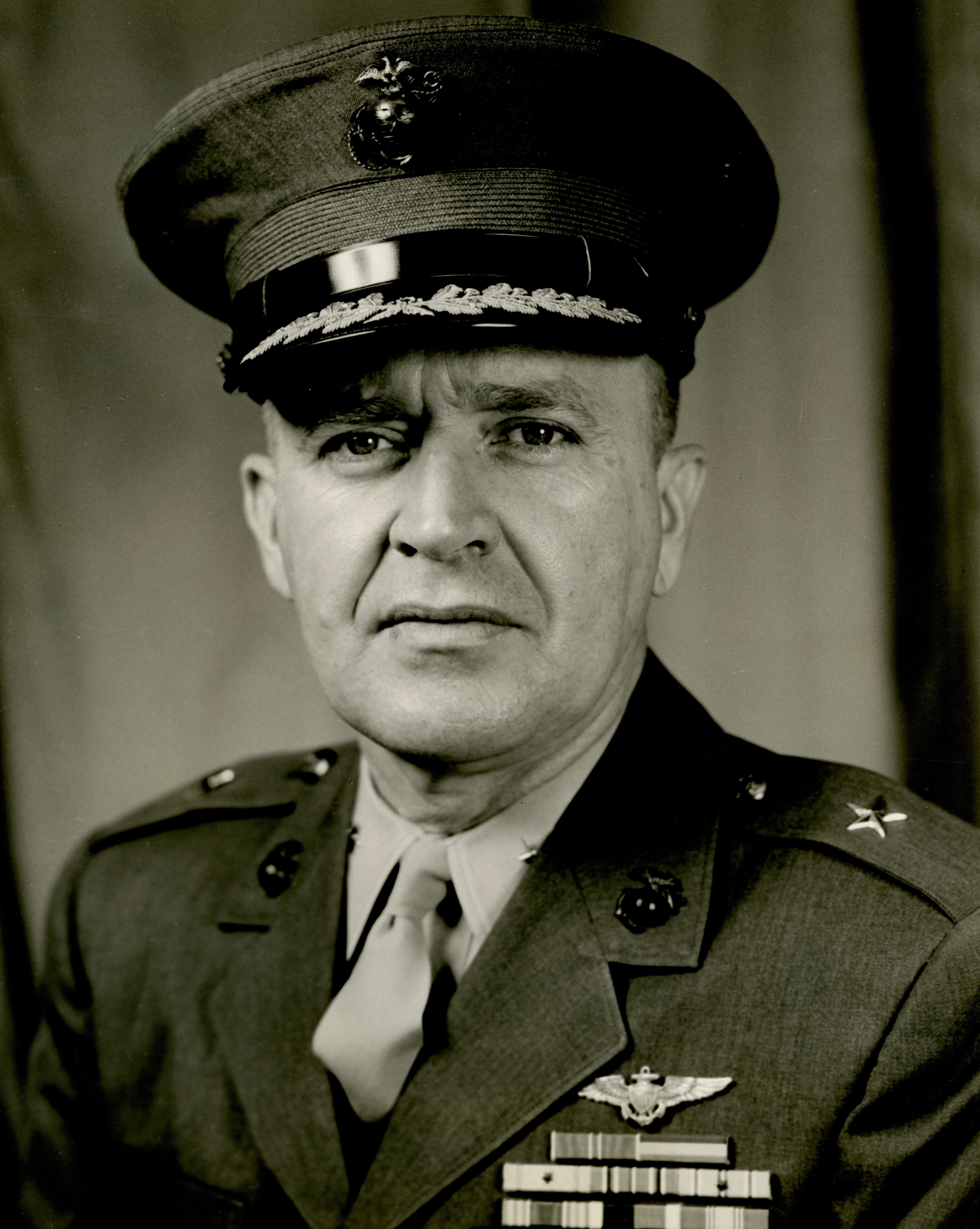
- Kline as Brigadier general, USMC
- Born: September 10, 1914; Sioux City, Iowa, U.S.
- Died: May 11, 2020 (aged 105); Scottsdale, Arizona, U.S.
- Military career
- Allegiance: United States of America
- Branch: United States Marine Corps
- Service years: 1935–1965
- Rank: Brigadier general
- Commands: Military Secretary to the CMC; Marine Air Control Group 1 Marine Aircraft Group 14
- Conflicts: World War II: Battle of Okinawa
- Awards: Legion of Merit; Bronze Star Medal

Roy Lewis Kline (September 10, 1914 – May 11, 2020) was a decorated naval aviator in the United States Marine Corps with the rank of brigadier general. A veteran of World War II, he distinguished himself as assistant air officer on the staff of Tenth Army during the Battle of Okinawa. Kline later served as Military Secretary to the Commandant of the Marine Corps, General Randolph M. Pate from 1958 to 1960.

He was promoted to the rank of brigadier general and served as the assistant wing commander, 1st Marine Aircraft Wing in Japan, before he returned to the United States for duty as deputy director for plans and policy (J-5), Directorate, Joint Staff, Office of the Joint Chief of Staff.

== Early career ==
Roy L. Kline was born on September 10, 1914, in Sioux City, Iowa, to Chester and Alice Kline. He grew up there and was active in Eagle Scout and also flew gliders at the local airport. Kline graduated from the Sioux City High School in summer 1931 and enrolled the Iowa State College in Ames, Iowa. While at the college, Kline served as vice president of the Class; was a member of Sigma Alpha Epsilon fraternity; and was chief editor of Iowa Engineer magazine. He was also a member of the Army Engineer Reserve Officer Training Corps.

Kline graduated with Bachelor of Science degree in mechanical engineering in June 1935 and decided for the Marine Corps service. He was commissioned second lieutenant on September 10, 1935, and was ordered to the Basic School at Philadelphia Navy Yard for Marine officers' instruction. With 124 students, it was the largest Basic School class to that date. This class provided two future Marine Corps Commandants (Leonard F. Chapman Jr. and Robert E. Cushman Jr.), five lieutenant generals (Lewis J. Fields, Frederick E. Leek, Herman Nickerson Jr., William J. Van Ryzin, Richard G. Weede), five major generals (William R. Collins, William T. Fairbourn, Bruno Hochmuth, Raymond L. Murray, Carey A. Randall) and six brigadier generals (William W. Buchanan, Odell M. Conoley, Frederick P. Henderson, Kline, John C. Miller Jr., Thomas F. Riley).

He completed the training in June 1936 and was assigned to the Marine detachment aboard the aircraft carrier Saratoga under the command of future World War II hero, then-Captain William F. Halsey and participated in the Fleet exercises with the Pacific Fleet. Kline was detached in June 1937, when he requested flight training and was ordered to the Naval Air Station Pensacola, Florida.

In April 1938, Kline completed the training and was ordered to San Diego, California, and joined the 2nd Marine Aircraft Group under Colonel Louis E. Woods. While in this capacity, he was promoted to first lieutenant in September 1938. Kline served in this assignment for two years, before he was transferred to Naval Air Station Pensacola, Florida for duty as a flight instructor.

== World War II ==
In May 1941, Kline was ordered to the Marine Corps Air Station, Quantico, Virginia, and joined the 1st Marine Aircraft Group under his former superior officer, Colonel Louis E. Woods. Kline was promoted to captain in November 1941 and ordered to Washington, D.C., for duty at the Bureau of Aeronautics, Navy Department and served consecutively under Rear admirals John H. Towers and John S. McCain. While there he was successively promoted to the temporary ranks of major (May 1942) and lieutenant colonel (September 1943).

Kline was ordered to South Pacific in February 1944 and joined the Marine Aircraft Group 23 under Colonel Kenneth H. Weir. He served as group operations officer and later as group executive officer and participated in the defense of Midway Atoll against possible Japanese attack from the air and sea. In August 1944, Kline was ordered to the Schofield Barracks in Honolulu, Hawaii, and joined the headquarters of recently activated Tenth Army as assistant air officer under Lieutenant General Simon B. Buckner. He accompanied the Tenth Army to Okinawa in April 1945 and was decorated with the Bronze Star Medal for his service.

== Postwar service ==
In August 1945, Kline returned to Hawaii and joined the staff of Commander-in-Chief, Pacific as Assistant Fleet Aviation Officer and served consecutively under Admirals Chester W. Nimitz, Raymond A. Spruance and John H. Towers. He returned to the United States in April 1946 and assumed command of Marine Air Detachment, Marine Air Reserve Training Command at Naval Air Station Grosse Ile, Michigan.

Kline participated in the training of Marine reservists until August 1947, when he was sent to the Marine Corps Schools, Quantico, Virginia, as a student in the Senior Course at the Amphibious Warfare School there. He completed the course in May 1948 and joined the staff of the Marine Corps Schools as a Resident member of the Marine Corps Development Board. Kline served for two years in that assignment, when he was transferred to the Marine Corps Air Station Cherry Point, North Carolina for duty with the Marine Aircraft Group 14.

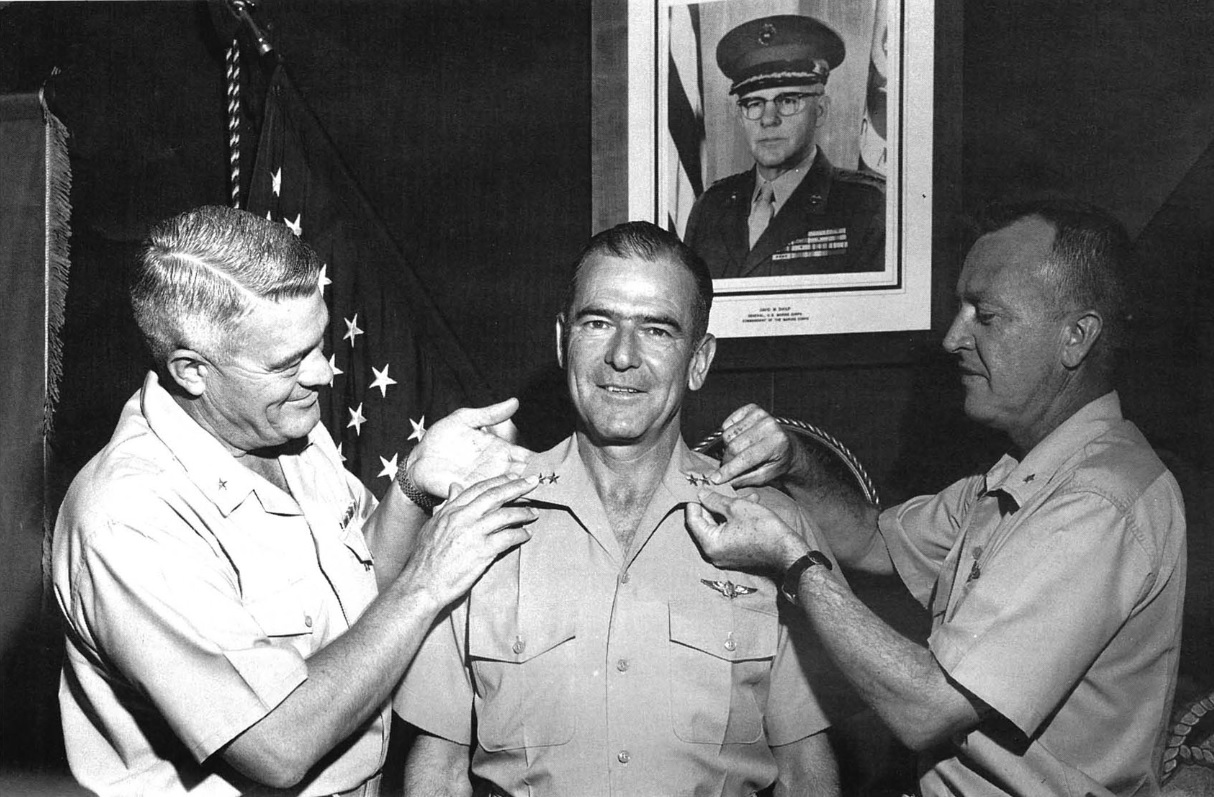
Kline (right) pinns on the new two-star insiginia on MG John P. Condon, 1st MAW Commander. On the left is Inspector general of the Marine Corps, BG Thomas F. Riley, MCAS Iwakuni, Japan, August 1961.

His group was attached to the 2nd Marine Aircraft Wing under Brigadier General William L. McKittrick, and Kline served consecutively as group's executive officer, deputy commander and commanding officer. He was promoted to colonel in February 1951 and also held additional duty as a member of the Pacific Fleet Evaluation Group in the Far East. Kline also served as the chief of staff of TRAEX-1, the first exercise of its kind in Fleet Marine Force, Atlantic in the Caribbean area.

In August 1952, Kline was ordered to the Naval War College at Newport, Rhode Island, and completed the senior course in the Strategy and Tactics in June 1953. He then rejoined 2nd Marine Aircraft Wing, now under Major General Clayton C. Jerome and served as chief of staff of Marine Landing Force under Brigadier General Robert E. Hogaboom during the Operation Weldfast, NATO Mediterranean maneuvers in October 1953, while British, Greek and Italian troops joined the Marines under their command.

Kline then rejoined 2nd Marine Aircraft Wing as commanding officer, Marine Air Control Group 1, before he was transferred to the Wing's staff for duty as assistant chief of staff for operations under Brigadier General Alexander W. Kreiser in December that year. He served in that assignment until August 1954, when he departed for the Far East again and joined the 1st Marine Aircraft Wing in Korea as assistant chief of staff for personnel (G-1) under Major General Marion L. Dawson.

He was responsible for the planning and execution of the training and replacements until June 1955, when he returned to the United States and ordered to the Marine Corps Base Quantico, Virginia. While there, Kline joined the headquarters of the Marine Corps Schools, Quantico under lieutenant GENERAL Gerald C. Thomas and assumed duty as director of the junior school. While in this capacity, he was responsible for the training of junior officers, mostly second and first lieutenants and captains.

Upon the appointment of lieutenant general Merrill B. Twining as new commandant of the schools in September 1956, Kline served as his chief of staff until June 1958, when he was transferred to Washington, D.C., for new assignment. He then joined the Headquarters Marine Corps and assumed duty as Military Secretary to the Commandant of the Marine Corps, General Randolph M. Pate. While in this capacity, Kline ran the day-to-day operations of the Office of the Commandant, supervised the schedule of the commandant, and performed other duties as the commandant may direct.

In November 1959, Kline was promoted to the rank of brigadier general and was succeeded by Colonel John P. Coursey two months later. He was ordered back to Marine Corps Air Station Cherry Point, North Carolina and assumed duty as assistant wing commander, 2nd Marine Aircraft Wing under Major General Ralph K. Rottet. Kline remained in that assignment until February 1961, when he was transferred to the Marine Corps Air Station Iwakuni, Japan and joined 1st Marine Aircraft Wing as assistant wing commander under Major General John P. Condon.

Kline returned to the United States in February 1962 and joined the Office of the Chief of Naval Operations (CNO) under Admiral George W. Anderson Jr. as his Marine Corps liaison officer. His main duty was to maintain liaison for the Commandant of the Marine Corps with CNO and advise on Marine Corps matters. He remained in that assignment until November that year, when he was ordered to the Pentagon for duty as deputy director for plans and policy (J-5), Directorate, Joint Staff, Office of the Joint Chief of Staff. Kline remained in that assignment until July 1, 1965, when he retired from active duty after 30 years of commissioned service. For his service at the Pentagon, he was decorated with the Legion of Merit.

== Retirement ==
Upon his retirement from the Marine Corps, Kline moved to Phoenix, Arizona, where he worked as an engineer for then newest manufacturing operation of Motorola Company. He remained in that company for next 20 years before he retired for second time in the mid-1980s. Following the death of his wife, Jean Cruikshank, in 2003, Kline remained in Phoenix with the help of his family until 2018, when he moved to the retirement home in Scottsdale, Arizona.

Brigadier General Roy L. Kline died on May 11, 2020, aged 105, just 4 months from his 106th birthday. He was survived by his sons Roy C. (Kip), and Peter; a daughter Julie; and four grandchildren and four great-grandchildren.

== Decorations ==
Brigadier General Kline's personal decorations include:

Naval Aviator Badge
1st Row	Legion of Merit	Bronze Star Medal	Navy Presidential Unit Citation
2nd Row	American Defense Service Medal with Base Clasp	American Campaign Medal	Asiatic-Pacific Campaign Medal with one 3/16 inch service star
3rd Row	World War II Victory Medal	Navy Occupation Service Medal	National Defense Service Medal with one service star

== See also ==
- Marine Aircraft Group 23

Military offices
Preceded by Ormond R. Simpson	Military Secretary to the Commandant of the Marine Corps; June 1958 - January 1960	Succeeded by John P. Coursey
