= William J. Van Ryzin =

US Marine Corps lieutenant general

William John Van Ryzin
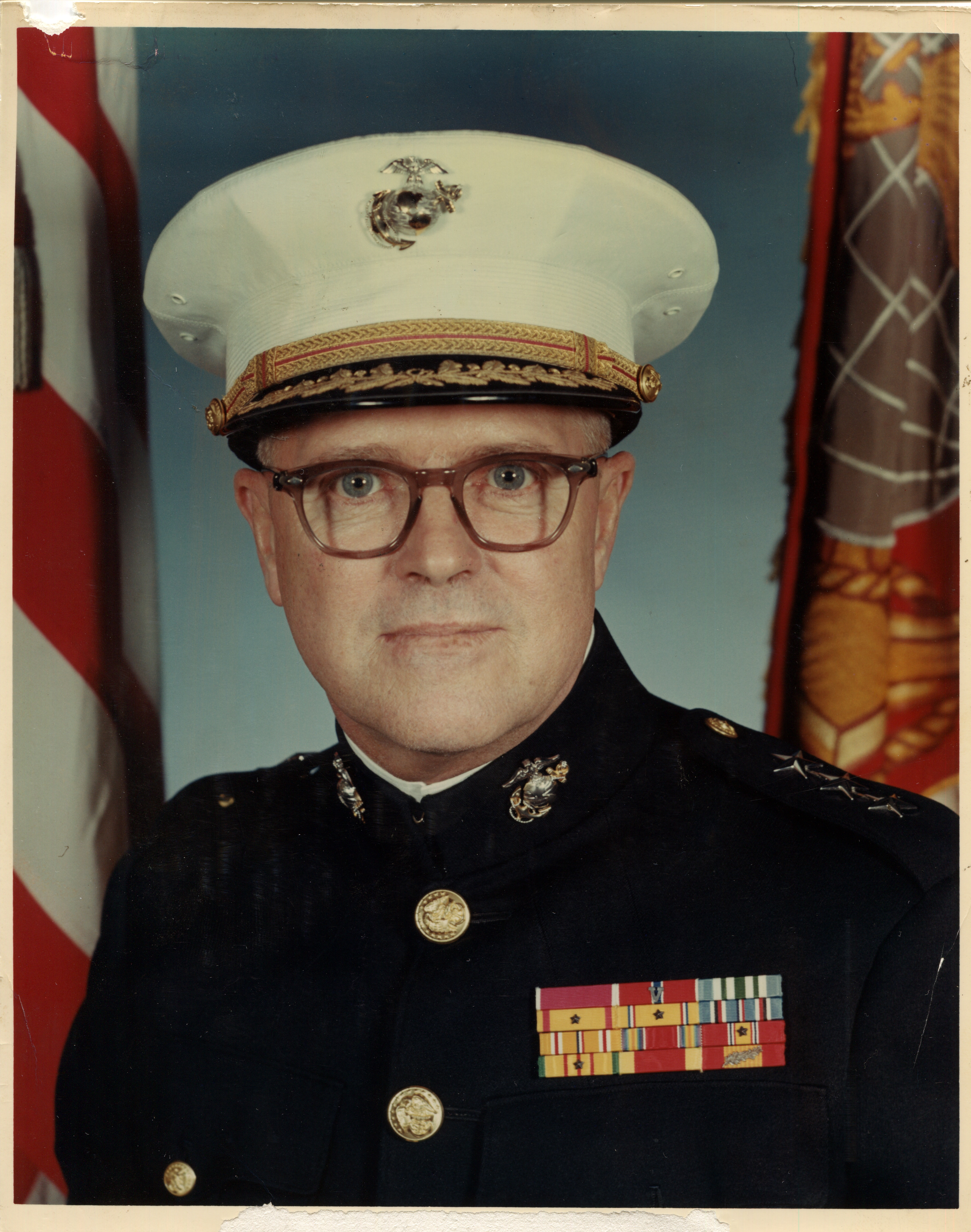
- LTG William J. Van Ryzin, USMC
- Born: April 20, 1914; Appleton, Wisconsin, U.S.
- Died: July 1, 2002 (aged 88); Washington, D.C., U.S.
- Military career
- Allegiance: United States of America
- Branch: United States Marine Corps
- Service years: 1935–1971
- Rank: Lieutenant general
- Service number: 0-5143
- Commands: Chief of Staff, HQMC; Deputy, III MEF; 2nd Marine Division; 18th Defense Battalion
- Conflicts: Yangtze Patrol; World War II: Battle of Tinian; Vietnam War: Tet Offensive
- Awards: Distinguished Service Medal (2); Legion of Merit (2); Bronze Star Medal; Joint Service Commendation Medal

William John Van Ryzin (April 20, 1914 – July 1, 2002) was a highly decorated officer of the United States Marine Corps with the rank of lieutenant general. He is most noted as Chief of Staff, Headquarters Marine Corps during the Vietnam War.

== Early life and education ==
Van Ryzin was born in Appleton, Wisconsin and attended local high school there. Van Ryzin subsequently enrolled at University of Wisconsin in Madison, Wisconsin, and graduated with Bachelor degree in June 1935. During his university years, he gained his first experiences with the military as a member of ROTC unit. Upon his graduation, Van Ryzin entered the Marine Corps service and was commissioned second lieutenant on July 8, 1935.

== Early career ==
After being commissioned as second lieutenant, Van Ryzin was sent to the Basic School at Philadelphia Navy Yard for basic officer training, which he completed in May 1936. With 124 students, it was the largest Basic School class to that date. This class provided two future Marine Corps Commandants (Leonard F. Chapman Jr. and Robert E. Cushman Jr.), five lieutenant generals (Lewis J. Fields, Frederick E. Leek, Herman Nickerson Jr., Van Ryzin, Richard G. Weede), five major generals (William R. Collins, William T. Fairbourn, Bruno Hochmuth, Raymond L. Murray, Carey A. Randall) and six brigadier generals (William W. Buchanan, Odell M. Conoley, Frederick P. Henderson, Roy L. Kline, John C. Miller Jr., Thomas F. Riley).

Van Ryzin was subsequently sent to China, where he was assigned to the Marine detachment at American Embassy in Beiping. He spent almost next three years with guard duties and was promoted to the rank of first lieutenant in August 1938.

In February 1939, Van Ryzin returned to the United States and was posted to the garrison at Marine Corps Base at San Diego, California. While in San Diego, he was assigned to the 1st Defense Battalion, which was activated there at the beginning of November 1939 under the command of Lieutenant Colonel Bertram A. Bone. For this assignment, Van Ryzin was ordered for the antiaircraft artillery course at Coast Artillery School at Fort Monroe, Virginia in August 1940.

He finished the course in December of that year and following a short Christmas leave, he rejoined 1st Defense Battalion at the beginning of January 1941, which meanwhile relocated to Pearl Harbor, Hawaii. Van Ryzin was promoted to the rank of captain in May 1941 and appointed commanding officer of the Three-inch antiaircraft artillery group stationed at Palmyra Island within 1st Defense Battalion. When Japanese attacked the Pearl Harbor on December 7, 1941, his unit participated in the antiaircraft artillery defense and Van Ryzin was later decorated with the Bronze Star Medal with Combat "V" for meritorious service in this capacity. Meanwhile, he was promoted to the rank of major in May 1942.

Van Ryzin was transferred back to Pearl Harbor and assigned to the staff of Marine Garrison Forces, 14th Naval District under Major General Harry K. Pickett. His new command was responsible for all Marine barracks and detachments securing Pacific naval bases, stations, and installations.

His next orders brought him to Camp Lejeune, North Carolina in May 1943 and after his promotion to the rank of lieutenant colonel during the following month, he was appointed commanding officer of 18th Antiaircraft Battalion, which was later re-designated 18th Defense Battalion. Van Ryzin led his unit overseas in August 1944 and took part in the occupation and defense of Tinian within Marianas Islands Campaign.

Lieutenant Colonel Van Ryzin was transferred to 12th Marine Regiment under Colonel Joseph W. Earnshaw in April 1945. He served first as 3rd Battalion commander and later as regimental executive officer, before he was appointed assistant chief of staff for personnel of 3rd Marine Division under Major General William E. Riley.

During this time, his division was stationed on Guam and trained for the upcoming Operation Downfall, Allied invasion to Japan. But following the Surrender of Japan in September 1945, 3rd Division received deactivation orders.

== Later career ==
Following World War II, he participated in the occupation of North China. Afterward, he served in a variety of staff assignments, including several billets at Headquarters Marine Corps, and later, as chief of staff for the Commander in Chief, U.S. Naval Forces, Eastern Atlantic and Mediterranean. Gen Van Ryzin commanded the 2d Marine Division from 1963 to 1965, and during the Vietnam War, served for three months as deputy commander, III Marine Amphibious Force. He retired from active duty with the Marine Corps in 1971.

== Retirement ==
Following retirement, he was involved in various professional and charitable activities in Shepherdstown, West Virginia. He was a founding member of the Historic Shepherdstown Commission and helped restore the historic Entler Hotel. For his volunteer work with the Jefferson County United Way, he was awarded the Tocqueville Award.

Van Ryzin married twice and had two children, one of whom became a colonel in the military. He was also active in the United Way of America, the Forty and Eight, and was a member of the Trinity Episcopal Church. Van Ryzin died on July 1, 2002, in Washington, D.C.

== Decorations ==
Here is the ribbon bar of Lieutenant General William J. Van Ryzin:

1st Row	Navy Distinguished Service Medal with one 5/16" Gold Star		Legion of Merit with Combat "V" and one 5/16" Gold Star	
2nd Row	Bronze Star Medal with Combat "V"	Joint Service Commendation Medal	China Service Medal with one star	American Defense Service Medal with Fleet Clasp
3rd Row	American Campaign Medal	Asiatic-Pacific Campaign Medal with one 3/16 inch service star	World War II Victory Medal	National Defense Service Medal with one star
4th Row	Vietnam Service Medal with two 3/16 inch service stars	National Order of Vietnam, Grade Knight	Vietnam Gallantry Cross with Palm	Vietnam Campaign Medal

Military offices
Preceded by Henry W. Buse Jr.	Chief of Staff, Headquarters Marine Corps; May 1, 1971 - July 31, 1972	Succeeded by John R. Chaisson
Preceded by Rathvon M. Tompkins	Commanding General of the 2nd Marine Division; September 27, 1963 - April 11, 1965	Succeeded by Ormond R. Simpson
