= Lewis J. Fields =

U.S. Marine Corps Lieutenant General

Lewis Jefferson Fields
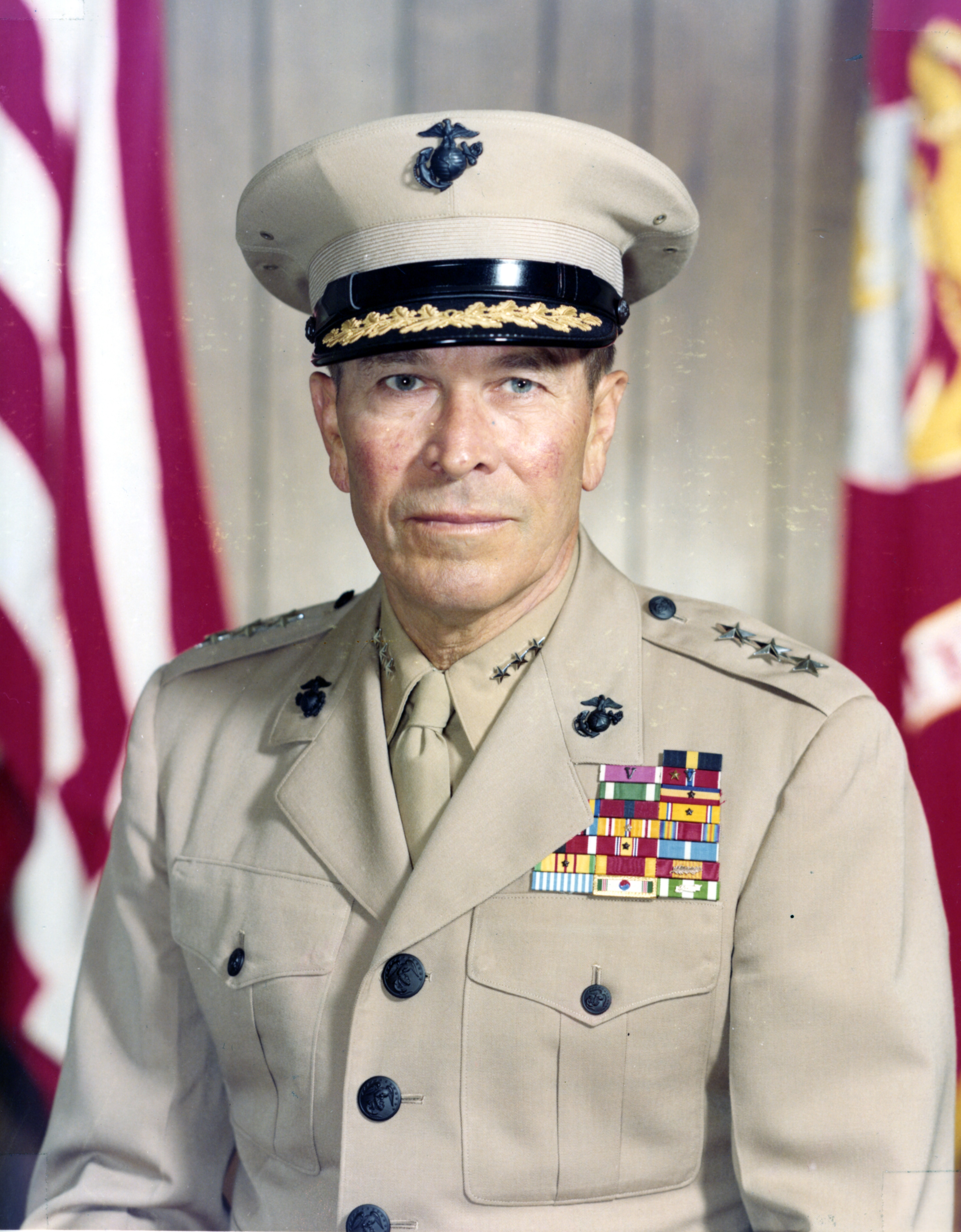
- Lt. Gen Lewis J. Fields, USMC
- Born: October 1, 1909; Delmar, Maryland, US
- Died: March 5, 1988 (aged 78); Fairfax, Virginia, US
- Burial place: Arlington National Cemetery
- Military career
- Allegiance: United States of America
- Branch: United States Marine Corps
- Service years: 1932–1970
- Rank: Lieutenant general
- Nickname: "Jeff"
- Service number: 0-5096
- Commands: Develop. and Education Command; 1st Marine Division; 5th Marine Division; 4th Marine Division; Camp Pendleton; Twentynine Palms; 11th Marine Regiment
- Conflicts: World War II: Battle of Guadalcanal; Battle of Edson's Ridge; Battle of Cape Gloucester; Battle of Peleliu; Korean War; Vietnam War: Operation Hot Springs; Operation Colorado; Operation Fresno
- Awards: Distinguished Service Medal (2); Legion of Merit; Bronze Star Medal (2)

Lewis Jefferson Fields (October 1, 1909 – March 5, 1988) was a highly decorated officer of the United States Marine Corps with the rank of lieutenant general. He served with 1st Marine Division during Vietnam War and later as commanding general of United States Marine Corps Development and Education Command.

== Early life and education ==
Fields was born on October 1, 1909, in Delmar, Maryland, and later attended a high school in Crisfield, Maryland, in 1927. He subsequently enrolled at St. John's College in Annapolis, Maryland, and graduated with Bachelor of Arts degree in Mathematics on June 3, 1931. During his junior high school years, Fields entered the Maryland National Guard and served continuously with that organization until January 1932. He struggled to find a job during the Great Depression, but decided to enlist in the Marine Corps in January 1932, hoping to obtain a commission.

== Career ==
Fields attended his basic training and subsequently rose to the rank of sergeant. He then served as drill instructor and as a member of the Marine detachment aboard the aircraft carrier USS Langley. He continuously displayed exemplary behavior and efficiency and was decorated with Marine Corps Good Conduct Medal. Moreover, Fields was selected for the Meritorious Non-Commissioned Officers Program and promoted to the rank of second lieutenant on June 25, 1935.

He attended The Basic School at Philadelphia Naval Shipyard in Philadelphia for officer training, and completed the school in October 1935 in the same class as two future Commandants of the Marine Corps, Leonard F. Chapman Jr. and Robert E. Cushman. With 124 students, it was the largest Basic School class to that date. The class graduated future Marine Corps Commandants Leonard F. Chapman Jr. and Robert E. Cushman Jr., lieutenant generals Herman Nickerson Jr., William J. Van Ryzin, and Richard G. Weede, generals William R. Collins, William T. Fairbourn, Bruno Hochmuth, Raymond L. Murray, and Carey A. Randall, and brigadier generals Odell M. Conoley, Roy L. Kline, John C. Miller Jr., and Thomas F. Riley.

He was subsequently assigned to the Sea School Detachment at Portsmouth Navy Yard, Virginia and remained in that assignment until June 1936. Fields was subsequently attached to the Marine detachment aboard the newly commissioned cruiser USS Quincy and took part in the evacuation of the United States nationals during the Spanish Civil War.

In July 1937, Fields was sent to the Base Defense Weapons Course at the Marine Corps Schools Quantico, Virginia. After graduating, he was promoted to first lieutenant in July 1938, and was appointed aide de camp to Richard P. Williams, the commanding general of the Fleet Marine Force. He served in this capacity until November 1941, when he was promoted to the rank of captain and sent to the Battery Commander course at Field Artillery School at Fort Sill, Oklahoma.

=== World War II ===
Upon the completing the course in March 1942, Fields was transferred to the 3rd Battalion, 11th Marine Artillery Regiment at Camp Lejeune, North Carolina. He was appointed battalion executive officer under Lieutenant Colonel James J. Keating and received promotion to major in May 1942. His battalion sailed within 1st Marine Division to the South Pacific area and arrived to New Zealand at the end of June 1942.

Fields and his battalion were ordered to Guadalcanal at the beginning of August 1942 and took part in the heavy fighting with tenacious Japanese forces. His battalion of 105mm howitzers was tasked with the Fire support of advancing 1st Marine Division units. Fields also participated in the famous Battle of Edson's Ridge in September 1942, and his artillery provided support for Marine Raiders.

Following the Guadalcanal Campaign, Fields was appointed commanding officer of the 1st Battalion, 11th Marines. His new command was already in Melbourne, Australia for rest and refit after heavy casualties. While in Australia, Fields was promoted to the rank of lieutenant colonel in May 1943. The 11th Marines were sent to Cape Sudest at New Guinea in September 1943 in order to prepare for upcoming Battle of Cape Gloucester at New Britain. The Gloucester operation was launched at the end of December 1943, and Fields went ashore with his battalion. He subsequently coordinated the support artillery fire during the attack on Aogiri Ridge and later during Natamo Point operation in late January 1944, while provided artillery support for the 5th Marines, which was trying to cut off Japanese withdrawal routes. Fields was decorated with the Bronze Star Medal with Combat "V" for his service at Gloucester.

In May 1944, Fields was promoted to the staff of 1st Marine Division under Major General William H. Rupertus and appointed to the capacity of assistant chief of staff for operations. He took part in the planning and coordination of Peleliu and Ngesebus operation between September and November 1944 and was decorated with the Legion of Merit with Combat "V" for his service.

His official citation reads:

... coordinated the training of the various elements of the division and obtained a high degree of combat efficiency. Closely collaborating with staff members in the various Naval Attack Forces, he prepared operational orders for the embarkation and landing, effectively coordinating them with the inland scheme of maneuver. Preparing plans and orders for the combined elements of the United States Armed Forces, he contributed materially to the seizure of the hazardous terrain dominating the airdromes on each island, thus insuring their complete security. His professional skill, initiative and devotion to duty were in keeping with the highest traditions of the United States Naval Service ...

During January 1945, Fields was transferred back to the United States and appointed aide-de-camp to the commandant of the Marine Corps, General Alexander A. Vandegrift at Headquarters Marine Corps.

In June 1947, Fields was ordered to take the Senior Course at Marine Corps Schools Quantico and after completing the course in June 1948, he was attached to the staff of commander in chief, US Atlantic Fleet at Norfolk, Virginia, under Admiral William H. P. Blandy. In this capacity, he also saw duty with the newly established NATO as assistant to the U.S. Representative to the North Atlantic Ocean Regional Planning Group as advisor on ground matters and defense of land areas in the Atlantic Command.

He later served as military advisor to the Joint Department of State/Department of Defense team sent to Portugal. Fields was promoted to the rank of colonel in May 1950 and joined Supreme Allied Command, Atlantic, as assistant chief of staff for personnel and administration under Admiral Lynde D. McCormick in January 1951. Fields helped in establishing of the present headquarters of SACLANT at Norfolk, Virginia and subsequently left this command in August 1951.

Fields was subsequently attached to the Headquarters Marine Corps in Washington, D.C., and appointed head of the Plans Branch within Division of Operations. He also simultaneously served as Marine Corps member of the Joint Strategic Plans Committee, Joint Chiefs of Staff under General Omar N. Bradley.

=== Korean War ===
He left for South Korea in September 1953, and assumed duties as assistant chief of staff for intelligence (G-2) on the staff of 1st Marine Division under Major General Randolph M. Pate. He served in this capacity until December 16, when he relieved Colonel Manly L. Curry as commanding officer of his old 11th Marine Artillery Regiment. The 11th Marines were stationed at Inchon and took part in several amphibious exercises. For his service in the Korea War, Fields was decorated with his second Bronze Star Medal.

Fields returned to the United States in April 1954 and following the brief leave, he was sent to Europe to the Supreme Headquarters, Allied Powers in Paris, as Chief of Plans Section under General Alfred Gruenther. His service in Europe ended in September 1956, when he was transferred to the headquarters of Fleet Marine Force, Atlantic at Norfolk, Virginia and appointed assistant chief of staff, G-3 under Lieutenant General Alfred H. Noble. Fields was promoted to chief of staff of that organization in September 1957 and three months later, he was appointed Marine Corps liaison officer to the Vice Chief of Naval Operations under Admiral Harry D. Felt. He received his first star, when he was promoted to the rank of brigadier general in July 1958.

In September 1958, Fields returned to the Office of the Joint Chiefs of Staff, where he was appointed deputy director for Plans at Directorate of Plans and Policy. Following two years in this assignment, Fields was transferred to California and appointed commanding general, Force Troops, Fleet Marine Force Pacific. In this capacity, he was responsible for all independent units under FMFLPAC, such as support artillery units, antiaircraft artillery units, military police battalions, separate engineer units and other miscellaneous force units. He also simultaneously served as commanding general of the Marine Corps Base Twentynine Palms.

Fields returned to the Headquarters Marine Corps in September 1962 and assumed duties as assistant director of personnel. One month later, he was promoted to the rank of major general and appointed director of personnel. Fields served in this capacity until July 1965 and received Navy Commendation Medal for his administrative work.

=== Vietnam War ===
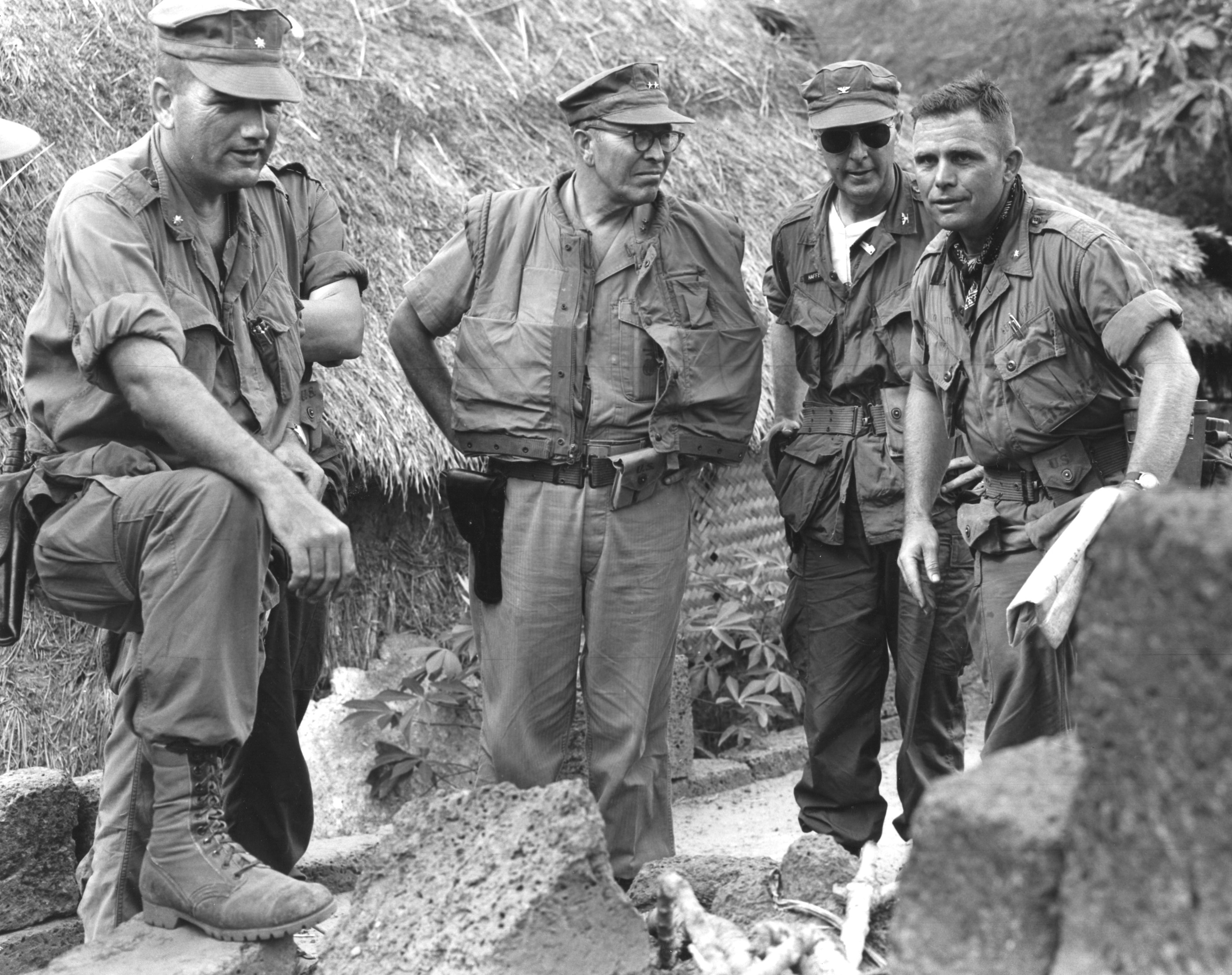
Fields and other Marines discussing a military operation in Chau Thuan Village during the Vietnam War in April 1966

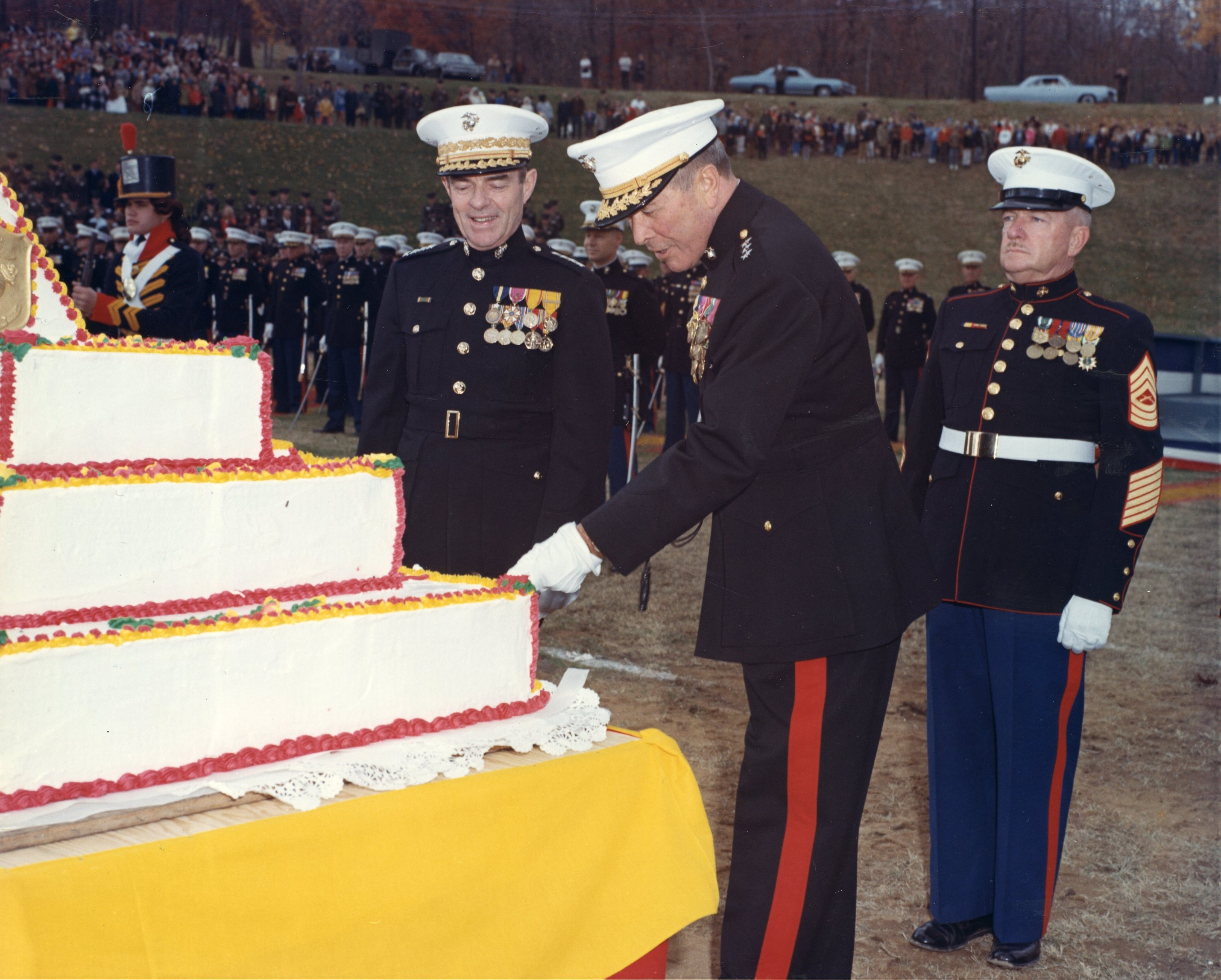
Fields and Marine Corps Commandant Wallace M. Greene (left) celebrating the United States Marine Corps birthday at Marine Corps Base Quantico in November 1969

General Fields was ordered to Camp Pendleton, California, where he relieved Brigadier General Edward H. Hurst on August 11, 1965, as temporary commanding general of the 1st Marine Division. His division was transferred to Okinawa, Japan, on August 24 and Fields assumed the responsibilities as commanding general of Task Force 79 within U.S. Seventh Fleet at the same time.

The several units of 1st Marine Division were deployed to South Vietnam during the rest of 1965 and participated in the amphibious operations as a part of Seventh Fleet landing force. Fields remained at Camp Courtney, Okinawa, where he oversaw the division's training for the combat deployment until the beginning of 1966. He ordered then the deployment of division headquarters at Chu Lai Base during March 1966 and assumed the Tactical area of responsibility over Chu Lai. He was also appointed deputy commander, III Marine Amphibious Corps under Lieutenant General Lewis W. Walt.

Fields planned and directed Operation Hot Springs in April 1966, during which his Marines killed over 150 enemy soldiers and captured a large number of weapons. At the beginning of August 1966, he also launched Operation Colorado, focused on the Vietcong activity in Quế Sơn Valley. His last effort in Vietnam was the planning and coordination of the search and destroy mission Operation Fresno at the beginning of September 1966. Even though the operation produced modest results, Fields received the Navy Distinguished Service Medal for his leadership. He also received the National Order of Vietnam, 5th Class and Vietnam Gallantry Cross with Palm from the government of South Vietnam.

Major General Fields was relieved by Herman Nickerson Jr. on September 30, 1966, and returned to the United States under the rotation policy. He assumed command of the 5th Marine Division at Camp Pendleton, California and participated in the training of all Marine reserve ground units. During March 1967, Fields assumed command of the 4th Marine Division and Camp Pendleton and continued in his work with training of reserve Marines.

He was promoted to the rank of lieutenant general in July 1968 and relieved James M. Masters Sr. as commanding general of United States Marine Corps Development and Education Command at Quantico, Virginia. Fields received his second Navy Distinguished Service Medal.

His official citation reads:

... Responsible for the education of all Marines, with particular emphasis on the professional training of Marine Corps officers in all aspects of amphibious operations, Lieutenant General Fields skillfully implemented a comprehensive, progressive program of basic, intermediate, and advanced instruction, contributing significantly to the high level of leadership and readiness of the Corps by providing highly competent commanders and staff officers for the air-ground forces. During this period, more than 26,000 Marines, as well as officers of the United States Army, Navy, Air Force, and over forty foreign countries, successfully advanced their military education and professional competence in courses of instruction that visibly reflected Lieutenant General Fields' own personal character, experience, and refined capacity for planning, organization, and management. Under his dynamic leadership, a Computer Science School initiated training of local personnel in programming and computer operations and provided professional education in computer science to selected officers and enlisted personnel in support of vital Marine Corps-wide systems requirements.

Fields retired from the Marine Corps after 38 years of active service on July 1, 1970.

== Personal life ==
After retiring from military service, Fields and his wife Elizabeth Packer Fields (1912–1981) settled in Fairfax, Virginia. They had two daughters, Elizabeth Fields Roberts and Mary Anne Fields Cherry.

He was active in the Marine Corps Historical Foundation and later as chairman of Marine Corps Officers Retired Luncheon Committee in the Washington, D.C. area. Following the death of his wife, he married Cheryl C. Fields (1916–2013), widow of Brigadier General Baskin R. Lawrence.

== Death ==
Fields died on March 5, 1988, at Fairfax Hospital, Virginia after heart, lung, and kidney ailments. He is buried at Arlington National Cemetery in Arlington County, Virginia.

== Decorations ==
Below is the ribbon bar of Lieutenant General Lewis J. Fields:

1st Row	Navy Distinguished Service Medal with one 5/16" Gold Star	Legion of Merit with Combat "V"	Bronze Star Medal with one 5/16" Gold Star and Combat "V"	Navy Commendation Medal
2nd Row	Navy Presidential Unit Citation with one star	Navy Unit Commendation with two stars	Marine Corps Good Conduct Medal	American Defense Service Medal with Base Clasp
3rd Row	American Campaign Medal	Asiatic-Pacific Campaign Medal with one 3/16 inch silver service star	World War II Victory Medal	Navy Occupation Service Medal
4th Row	National Defense Service Medal with one star	Korean Service Medal	Vietnam Service Medal with two 3/16 inch service stars	National Order of Vietnam, 5th Class
5th Row	Vietnam Gallantry Cross with Palm	Republic of Korea Presidential Unit Citation	United Nations Korea Medal	Vietnam Campaign Medal

== See also ==
- 4th Marine Division
- 5th Marine Division

Military offices
Preceded by James M. Masters Sr.	Commanding General of the Development and Education Command; July 1, 1968 - July 1, 1970	Succeeded by Raymond G. Davis
Preceded by Robert E. Cushman Jr.	Commanding General of the 4th Marine Division; March 1, 1967 – June 14, 1968	Succeeded by Wood B. Kyle
Preceded by Robert E. Cushman Jr.	Commanding General of the 5th Marine Division; October 1, 1966 - March 2, 1967	Succeeded by Webb D. Sawyer
Preceded by Edward H. Hurst	Commanding General of the 1st Marine Division; August 11, 1965 - September 30, 1966	Succeeded by Herman Nickerson Jr.
Preceded by Alpha L. Bowser	Commanding General of Marine Corps Base Twentynine Palms; September 30, 1960 - August 30, 1962	Succeeded by Joseph L. Stewart
