= Carey A. Randall =

U.S. Marine Corps Major General

Carey Allen Randall
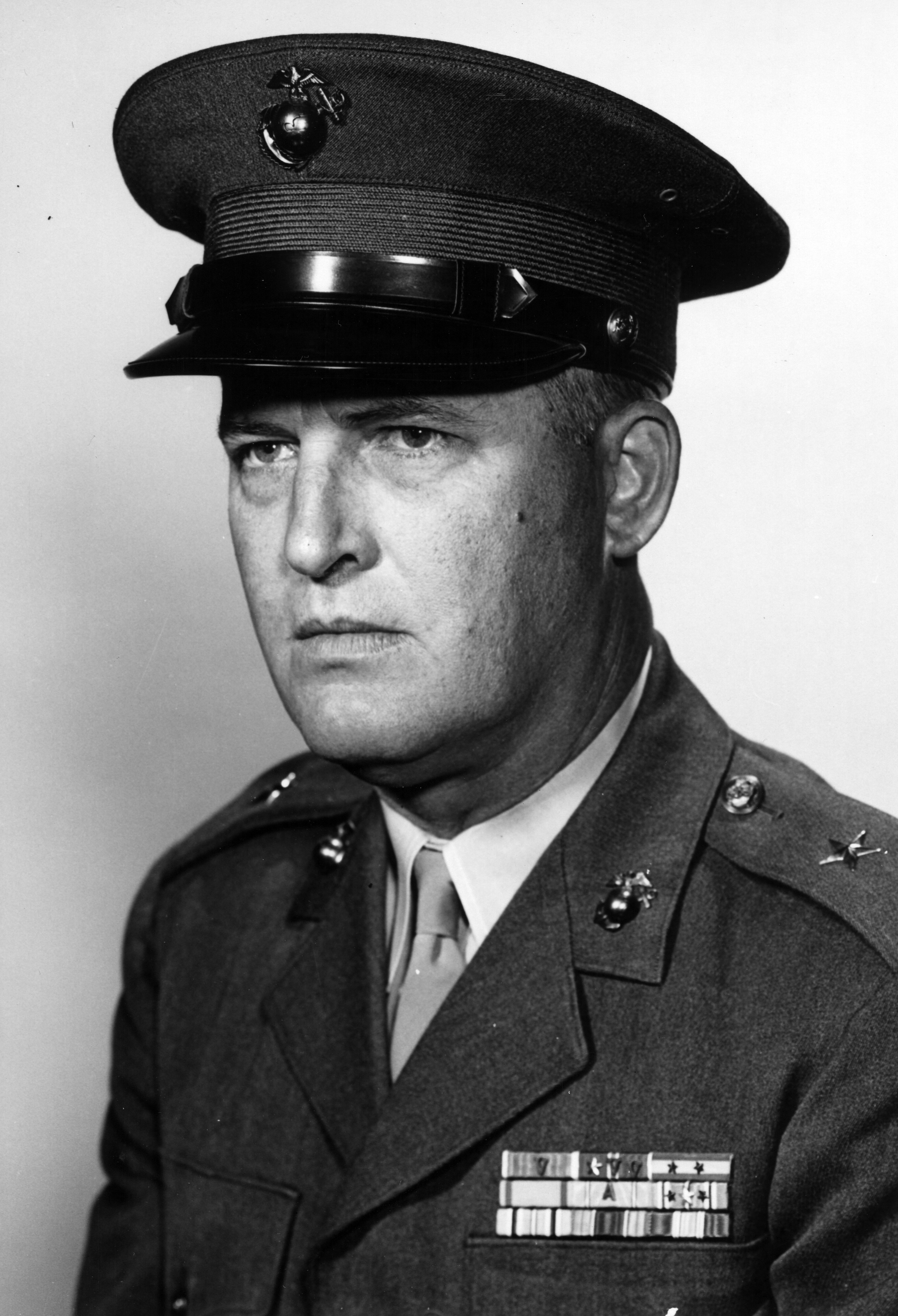
- Randall as Brigadier general, USMC
- Born: November 15, 1912; Gloster, Mississippi, US
- Died: April 26, 2008 (aged 95); Jackson, Mississippi, US
- Burial place: Natchez National Cemetery
- Military career
- Allegiance: United States
- Branch: United States Marine Corps
- Service years: 1935–1960
- Rank: Major general
- Service number: 0-5132
- Commands: Military assistant to OSD; 1st Battalion, 9th Marines
- Conflicts: Yangtze Patrol; World War II: Marshalls–Gilberts raids; Battle of Midway; Bougainville Campaign; Recapture of Guam; Battle of Iwo Jima
- Awards: Distinguished Service Medal; Legion of Merit; Bronze Star Medal (2)

Carey Allen Randall (November 15, 1912 – April 26, 2008) was a highly decorated officer in the United States Marine Corps with the rank of major general. A veteran of World War II, he is most noted for his service as military assistant to the Secretary of Defense from 1951 to 1960.

== Early career ==
Carey A. Randall was born on November 15, 1912, in Gloster, Mississippi, as the son of Mack Allen and Marry Etta Randall. Following the high school, he attended the University of Mississippi in Oxford for one year, before switched to Louisiana State University in Baton Rouge. Randall graduated there with Bachelor of Science degree in civil engineering in May 1934 and spent next year with postgraduate work at Louisiana State University. During his postgraduate course, he completed advanced ROTC course and received Army Reserve commission in May 1935.

He entered the Marine Corps on July 1, 1935, and was commissioned second lieutenant on that date. Randall was subsequently ordered to the Basic School at Philadelphia Navy Yard for basic officer training, which he completed in March 1936. With 124 students, it was the largest Basic School class to that date. This class provided two future Marine Corps Commandants (Leonard F. Chapman Jr. and Robert E. Cushman Jr.), five lieutenant generals (Lewis J. Fields, Frederick E. Leek, Herman Nickerson Jr., William J. Van Ryzin, Richard G. Weede), five major generals (William R. Collins, William T. Fairbourn, Bruno Hochmuth, Raymond L. Murray, Randall) and six brigadier generals (William W. Buchanan, Odell M. Conoley, Frederick P. Henderson, Roy L. Kline, John C. Miller Jr., Thomas F. Riley).

Randall was then ordered to the Puget Sound Navy Yard in Bremerton, Washington, and served there until he was ordered for expeditionary duty in China in June 1937. He then served with 4th Marine Regiment under Colonel Charles F. B. Price at Shanghai International Settlement and later took part in guard duties at American Embassy in Beiping. During his time in China, he was promoted to the ranks of first lieutenant and returned to the United States in October 1939. Upon his return, Randall was stationed at Marine Corps Base Quantico until May 1941 and reached the rank of captain.

== World War II ==
Randall subsequently assumed command of the Marine detachment aboard the aircraft carrier USS Enterprise and participated in the transportation of Marine Fighter Squadron 211 to Wake Island at the time of Japanese attack on Pearl Harbor on December 7, 1941. The Enterprise subsequently took part in the Marshall-Gilberts and Wake Island raids in February 1942 and Marcus Island raid in March and famous battle of Midway in June of that year.

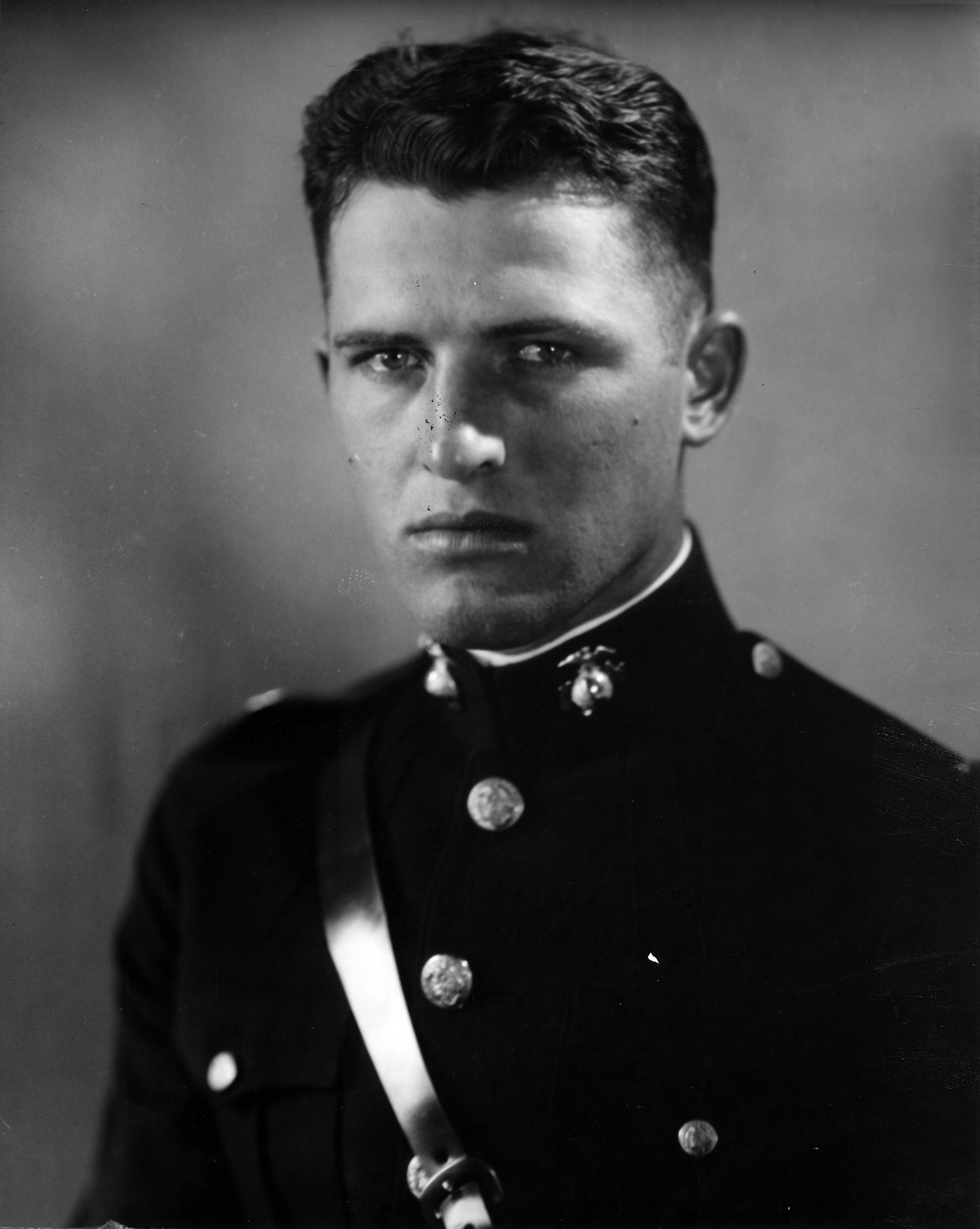
Randall as second lieutenant in October 1935.

He left Enterprise in June 1942 and assumed duty executive officer with 3rd Battalion, 9th Marines at San Diego, California where he was promoted to the rank of major. His unit sailed within 3rd Marine Division under Major General Charles D. Barrett to the Pacific area in January 1943 and after eight months of training at New Zealand and later at Guadalcanal, they sailed for Bougainville, Solomon Islands at the beginning of November 1943.

Randall, who was meanwhile promoted to lieutenant colonel, assumed command of 1st Battalion, 9th Marines on November 19 and distinguished himself during the combat between November 21 and December 28. He set up his command post only 75 yards from the Japanese lines and maintained personal contact with the assault troops of his battalion despite intense enemy rifle and machine gun fire. For this act of valor, Randall was decorated with the Bronze Star Medal with Combat "V".

The 9th Marine Regiment under Colonel Edward A. Craig was ordered back to Guadalcanal for rest and refit and Randall spent next seven months with training. He led his battalion to Guam at the end of July 1944 and distinguished himself again. Randall went ashore with the first waves of landing troops and pushed his units aggressively forward. His unit suffered minimum of casualties and seized all objectives in a minimum of time. He repeatedly and without regard of his personal safety, exposed himself to enemy rifle, machine gun and mortar fire and received the Legion of Merit with Combat "V" for this act of valor.

Randall remained with his unit at Guam and again took part in the intensive training under the command of new regimental commander, Howard N. Kenyon. At the beginning of 1945, 3rd Marine Division and its subordinate units were ordered to take part the capture of Iwo Jima, one of the Japanese Volcano Islands which lies south of the Bonin Islands.

He landed with his battalion on February 24, 1945, and participated in the combats near Motoyama airfield until mid-March, when he assumed command of divisional Headquarters and Service battalion. Randall remained on Iwo Jima until April 1945 and subsequently left for the United States. For his service at Iwo Jima, he was decorated with second Bronze Star Medal.

== Postwar career ==
Upon his return to the United States in April 1945, Randall assumed duty as executive officer of Marine Rifle Range at Camp Matthews near San Diego, California. He served in this capacity until July 1946 and then was appointed Inspector-Instructor with 16th Marine Reserve Infantry Battalion in Indianapolis.

He left that assignment in July 1948, when he was ordered for the regular course at the Army Command and General Staff College at Fort Leavenworth, Kansas which he completed in July of the following year. Randall then assumed duty as an instructor at the Armed Forces Staff College at Norfolk, Virginia, and served in this capacity until November 1950.

Randall was subsequently transferred to the Pentagon in Washington, D.C., and assumed duty as executive officer to Deputy Secretary of Defense, Robert A. Lovett. While in this capacity, Randall was promoted to the rank of colonel in January 1951.

In September 1951, Lovett was appointed Secretary of Defense and requested Randall as his military assistant. He successively served as military assistant to secretaries Charles E. Wilson, Neil H. McElroy and Thomas S. Gates Jr. While in this capacity, Randall was promoted to the rank of brigadier general in March 1957.

Randall retired from active service at his own request in March 1959 and was advanced to the rank of major general for having been specially commended for performance of duty in actual combat. However, he was immediately recalled to active duty and served as military assistant to Secretary Gates until February 1960.

He retired for second time on February 16, 1960, with the rank of major general and received the Navy Distinguished Service Medal by Secretary Gates for his service as military assistant from September 1951 to February 1960. He also held additional duty as secretary of Armed Forces Policy Council between these dates.

== Retirement ==
Following his retirement from the marine corps, Randall attended the law school of the University of Miami at Coral Gables, Florida, and graduated with honors with Master of Laws degree in summer 1963. He then served as both the executive editor and editor in chief of the University of Miami Law Review and also served as managing partner of Walton Lantaff Schroeder and Carson, prominent law firm in Miami.

Major General Carrey A. Randall died on April 26, 2008, at St. Dominic Hospital in Jackson, Mississippi. He is buried at Natchez National Cemetery, Mississippi, together with his wife Mary Pearle Randall.

== Awards and decorations ==
Here is the ribbon bar of Major General Randall:

1st Row	Navy Distinguished Service Medal		
2nd Row	Legion of Merit with Combat "V"	Bronze Star Medal with Combat "V" and 5/16" Gold Star	Navy Presidential Unit Citation with two stars
3rd Row	China Service Medal	American Defense Service Medal with "A" Device	Asiatic-Pacific Campaign Medal with one silver 3/16 inch service star
4th Row	American Campaign Medal	World War II Victory Medal	National Defense Service Medal
Office of the Secretary of Defense Identification Badge
