= Thomas F. Riley =

U.S. Marine Corps general (1912–1998)

Thomas Felton Riley
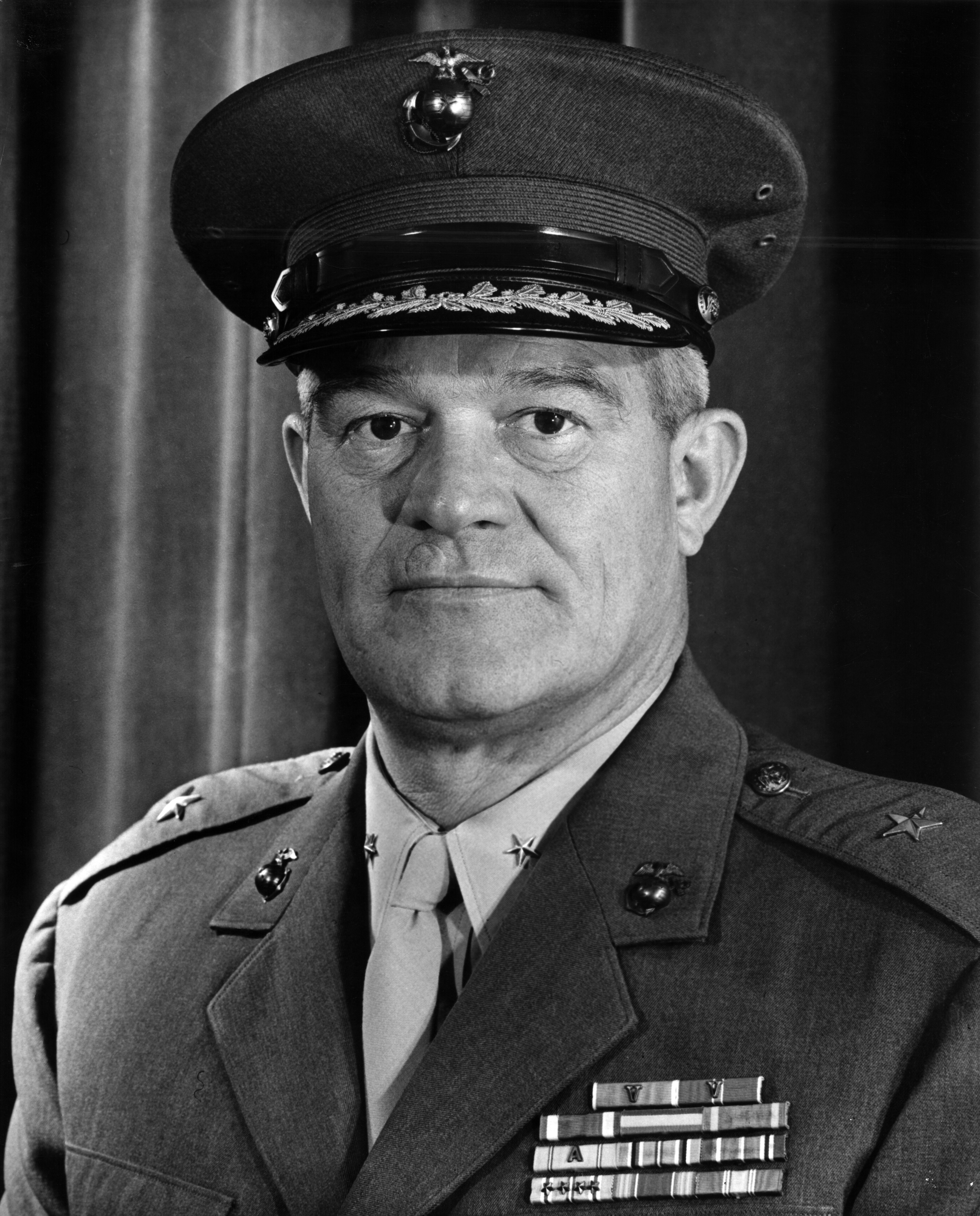
- BG Thomas F. Riley, USMC
- Born: July 6, 1912; Harrisonburg, Virginia, US
- Died: February 19, 1998 (aged 85); Newport Beach, California, US
- Burial place: Arlington National Cemetery
- Military career
- Allegiance: United States of America
- Branch: United States Marine Corps
- Service years: 1935–1964
- Rank: Brigadier general
- Service number: 0-5133
- Commands: Inspector General of the Marine Corps; 1st Marine Division
- Conflicts: World War II: Occupation of Iceland; Guadalcanal Campaign; Bougainville Campaign; Landing on Emirau; Battle of Saipan; Recapture of Guam
- Awards: Legion of Merit; Bronze Star Medal; Navy Commendation Medal
- Other work: Orange County Supervisor; Orange County Chair; Orange County Vice Chair

Thomas Felton Riley (July 6, 1912 – February 19, 1998) was a decorated officer of the United States Marine Corps with the rank of brigadier general. He is most noted for his service during the Guadalcanal Campaign as the commanding officer of First Aviator Engineer Battalion. Riley completed his career as Inspector General of the Marine Corps in 1964 and then served as Orange County Supervisor 1974–1994 as well as Chair of the Orange County Board of Supervisors from 1977–1979, 1985–1986, and 1989–1990, and Vice Chair from 1984–1985 and 1988–1989.

== Early career ==
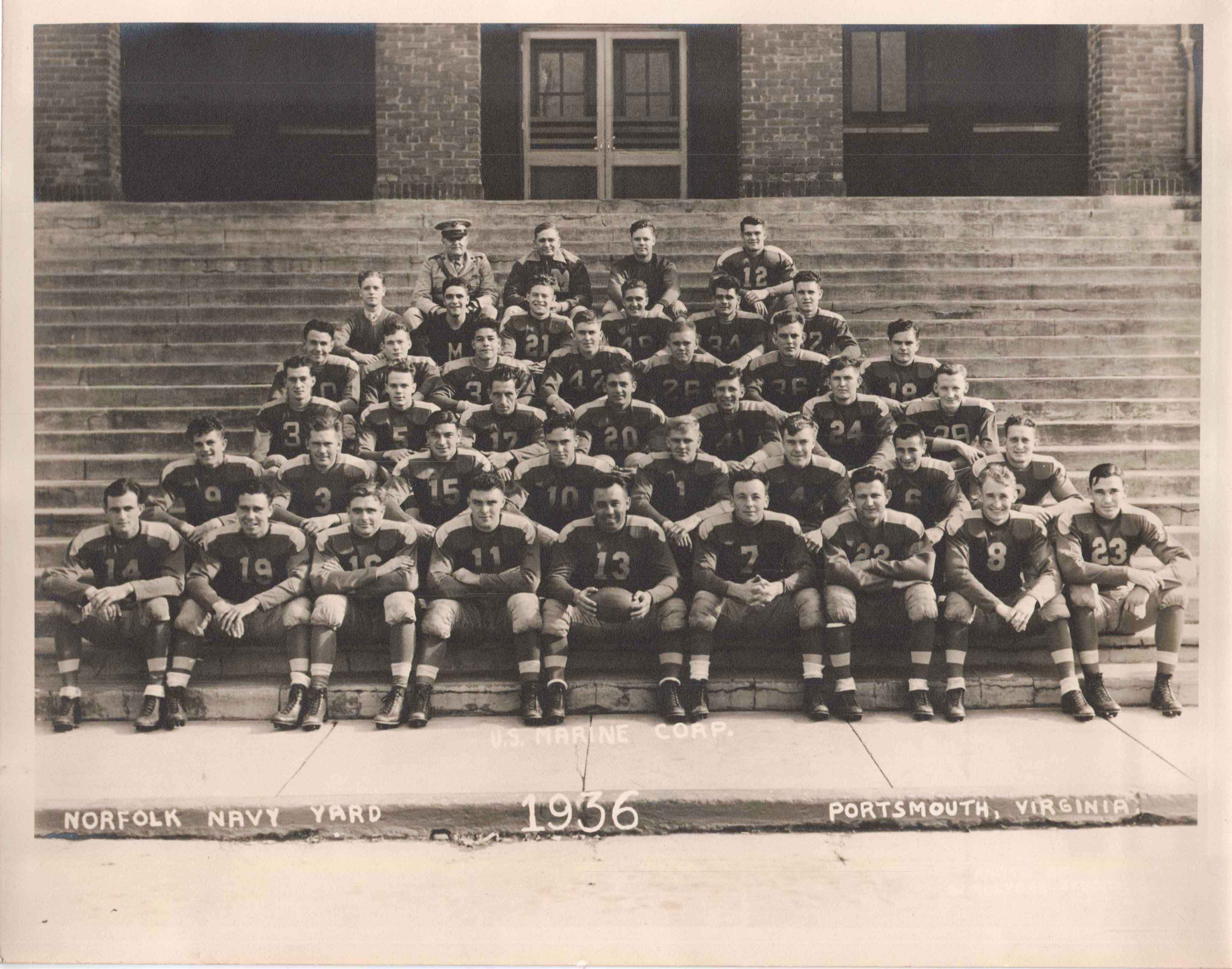
U.S. Marine Corps Football Team, Norfolk Naval Yard in 1936. Riley, wearing#12 jersey, is seated in the last row, far right.

Thomas F. Riley was born on July 6, 1912, in Harrisonburg, Virginia, as the son of Thomas A. Riley and attended the high school there in summer of 1931. He was then admitted to the Virginia Military Institute at Lexington and graduated in June 1935 with Bachelor of Science degree in civil engineering. While in college, Riley was a member of ROTC unit and held reserve commission since July 1931. He was also active in football, baseball and boxing teams and served as president of the Shenandoah Club in his senior year.

Following his graduation from VMI, he resigned his Army Reserve commission and accepted appointment as second lieutenant in the Marine Corps on July 10, 1935. He was subsequently ordered to the Basic School at Philadelphia Navy Yard for further officer training and completed the school in March 1936. With 124 students, it was the largest Basic School class to that date. This class provided two future Marine Corps Commandants (Leonard F. Chapman Jr. and Robert E. Cushman Jr.), five lieutenant generals (Lewis J. Fields, Frederick E. Leek, Herman Nickerson Jr., William J. Van Ryzin, Richard G. Weede), five major generals (William R. Collins, William T. Fairbourn, Bruno Hochmuth, Raymond L. Murray, Carey A. Randall) and six brigadier generals (William W. Buchanan, Odell M. Conoley, Frederick P. Henderson, Roy L. Kline, John C. Miller Jr. and Riley).

Riley was then ordered to the Norfolk Navy Yard and served with the local Marine Barracks until January 1937. While stationed at Norfolk, Riley was also a member of Marine Corps Football Team. Riley was subsequently attached to the Marine detachment aboard the newly commissioned cruiser USS Vincennes and took part in the voyage to the Panama Canal Zone and participated in the Fleet Problem XIX.

His sea duties ended in June 1938, when he was promoted to the rank of first lieutenant and attached to the 29th U.S. Army Engineers in Portland, Oregon, and attended instruction in aerial photo mapping. Riley then served with 1st Marine Brigade under Brigadier General Richard P. Williams at Quantico, Virginia, as commanding officer of 1st Engineer Company until September 1939 and following the expansion of the company to 1st Engineer Battalion, he was appointed a company commander within that unit.

He sailed with his battalion to Guantanamo Bay, Cuba, in September 1940 and participated amphibious exercises. Riley was promoted to the rank of captain in May 1941 and appointed commanding officer of the Marine detachment aboard the battleship USS New York. While aboard that ship, he took part in the escorting of cargo and troop ships to Iceland and Scotland.

== World War II ==
When the Japanese attacked the Pearl Harbor in December 1941, Riley was still aboard the USS New York in the Atlantic Ocean on convoy duty. He was detached from New York following his promotion to the rank of major in May 1942 and ordered to Camp Lejeune, North Carolina. Riley was subsequently tasked with the formation of 1st Aviation Engineer Battalion, Fleet Marine Force. This unit was designated as a separate engineer battalion intended to be airlifted onto islands to repair captured airfields.

He sailed with that unit to the Pacific area in August 1942 and took part in the construction of a landing field on New Caledonia. Riley and his engineers were ordered to Guadalcanal in November of that year and took part in the rehabilitation of Henderson Field after heavy fighting. He was later responsible for the construction of Sailer Field there and departed Guadalcanal in February 1943. For his service during the construction of the airfields there, he was decorated with the Bronze Star with Combat "V".

Riley was then stationed again at Noumea, New Caledonia and was promoted to lieutenant colonel in August 1943. He was transferred to the staff of III Marine Amphibious Corps in October of that year and served as assistant engineer and executive officer of the Engineer Section during the campaigns at Bougainville, Emirau, Saipan and Guam.

During the recapture of Guam in July 1944, Riley led a shore party ashore under heavy fire and distinguished himself. He was subsequently decorated with the Legion of Merit with Combat "V" for his service on Guam. He was ordered back to the United States in September 1944 and assigned to the Headquarters Marine Corps. He served as the officer in charge of Engineer Supply Division, Quartermaster General's Department under Brigadier General William P. T. Hill and received the Navy Commendation Medal for service in this capacity.

== Postwar service ==
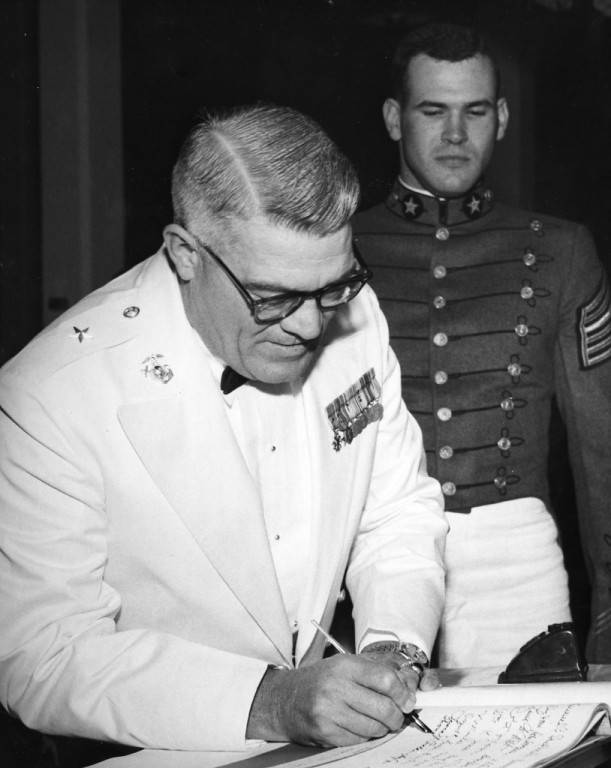
Brigadier General Thomas F. Riley (Class of 1935) as Guest of Honor and Cadet Josiah Bunting, Virginia Military Institute, 1963.

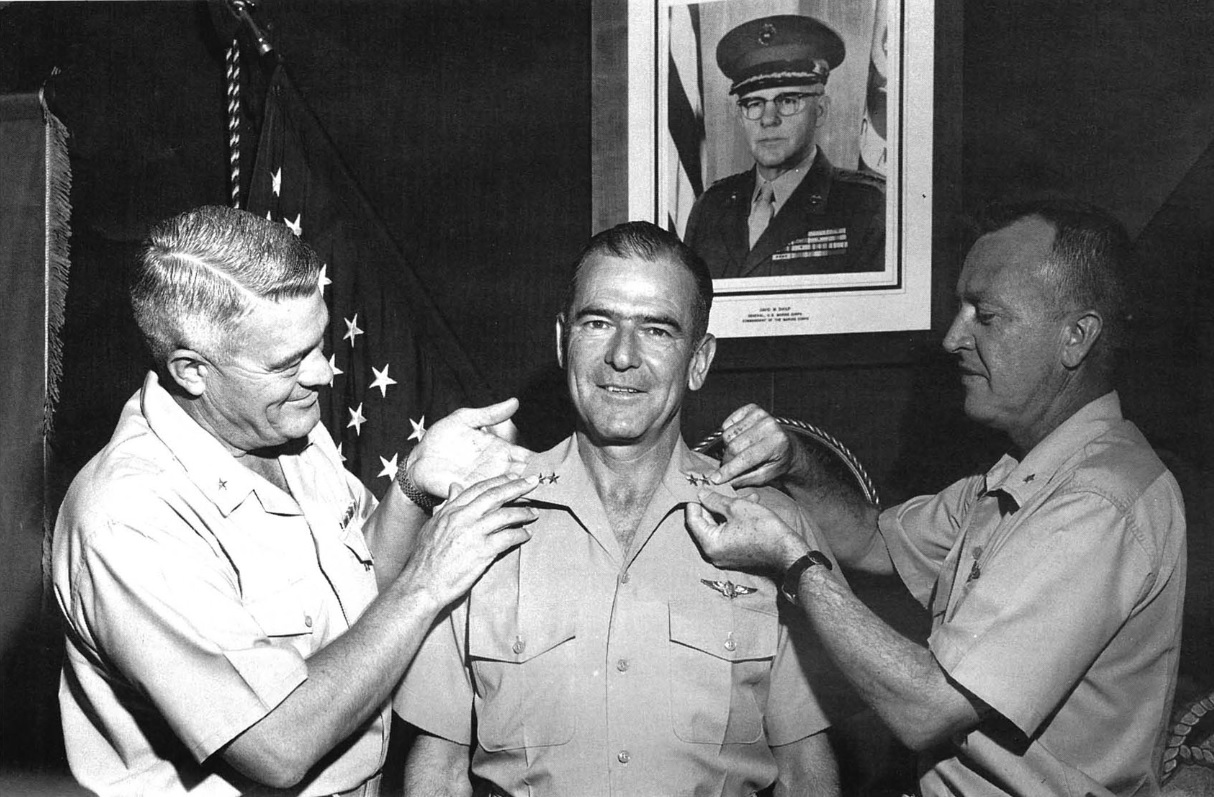
Riley toured all Marine bases around the world during his tenure as Inspector General. Here shown during the promotion of Brigadier General John P. Condon on August 7, 1961, at Iwakuni, Japan. Condon's deputy, Brigadier General Roy L. Kline is on the right.

He remained in Washington until October 1946, when he was transferred to Baltimore, Maryland and appointed Inspector-Instructor of 11th Engineer Battalion, Marine Corps Reserve. Riley sailed again to the Pacific area in July 1948 and assumed duty as executive officer of 5th Service Depot at Guam. His depot consisted of engineer company, signal company, military police company, ordnance company, supply company, transport company and several Marine ammunition companies and served as support depot for units in that area. In July 1949, Riley assumed command of the depot and remained in charge until February 1950, when the depot was ordered back to the United States and attached to the Marine Corps Logistics Base Barstow, California.

Riley was sent to the Armed Forces Staff College at Norfolk, Virginia, in August of that year, and, upon graduation in January 1951, he was promoted to the rank of colonel. He was then attached to the Headquarters of Fleet Marine Force, Atlantic at Norfolk and served consecutively as assistant engineer officer, and engineer officer, under Lieutenant General Graves B. Erskine.

He was ordered to Washington, D.C., in June 1952 and attached to the Headquarters Marine Corps as head of planning branch, G-4 Division (logistics) again under his World War II superior, Major General William P. T. Hill. Riley was ordered to Quantico in June 1954 and attached to the Advanced Research Group. This group was tasked with the development of the recommendations on how the MAGTF should evolve structurally to meet the challenges of atomic warfare and new technologies such as helicopters and jet aircraft.

Riley departed Quantico in July 1955 and joined 2nd Marine Division at Camp Lejeune, North Carolina. He served consecutively as Divisional Chief of staff under Major Generals Lewis B. Puller, Edward W. Snedeker and Reginald H. Ridgely. When Ridgely was appointed commander of Camp Pendleton, California, in June 1957, he requested Riley as his chief of staff. Riley was then co-responsible for the training of new recruits until January 1959, when he was nominated for the promotion to the rank of brigadier general.

He joined 1st Marine Division at Camp Pendleton as assistant division commander under Major General Edward W. Snedeker. When Snedeker was appointed commandant of the Marine Corps Schools, Quantico, at the beginning of October 1959, Riley assumed temporary duty as commander of the 1st Marine Division and served in this capacity for one month until the arrival of Major General Henry R. Paige. He then resumed his duties as assistant division commander and remained at Camp Pendleton until July 1960.

Riley assumed duty of assistant division commander, 3rd Marine Division on Okinawa, Japan and served under Major General Donald M. Weller until June 1961. Because of the ongoing Laotian Civil War and worsening situation in Vietnam, he was tasked with the training and combat preparation of the division for Counter-guerrilla operations.

Upon his return to the United States and a brief period of leave at home, Riley assumed duty as Inspector General of the Marine Corps on July 1, 1961. In this capacity, he was responsible for the conducting investigations and inspections of Marine units within the limits of the United States and also on the bases in Pacific theater. Riley served in this capacity until July 1, 1964, when he retired after almost 30 years of active service.

== Civil career ==
Riley settled in Orange County, California, and worked in the aerospace industry until September 1974, when he was appointed by then-Governor of California, Ronald Reagan, to the capacity of Supervisor of Orange County's Fifth District. He replaced Ronald Caspers, who had died in office when his ship disappeared in June of that year just nine days after being reelected.

During his 20 years as Supervisor, nearly 1 million people moved to Orange County, more than 300,000 homes were built and five new cities sprang up, three of them in Riley's district. He was also responsible for the expansion of John Wayne Airport, where the terminal built in September 1990 was named after him. The Thomas F. Riley Wilderness Park near Rancho Santa Margarita, California was also named after him.

However the end of his tenure in 1995 was marred as his retirement coincided with Orange County's financial fall. Riley and two fellow board members, Gaddi H. Vasquez and Harriett M. Wieder, were able to escape misconduct charges by leaving office. While others sought to shift blame for the bankruptcy, Riley was one of the few to take responsibility.

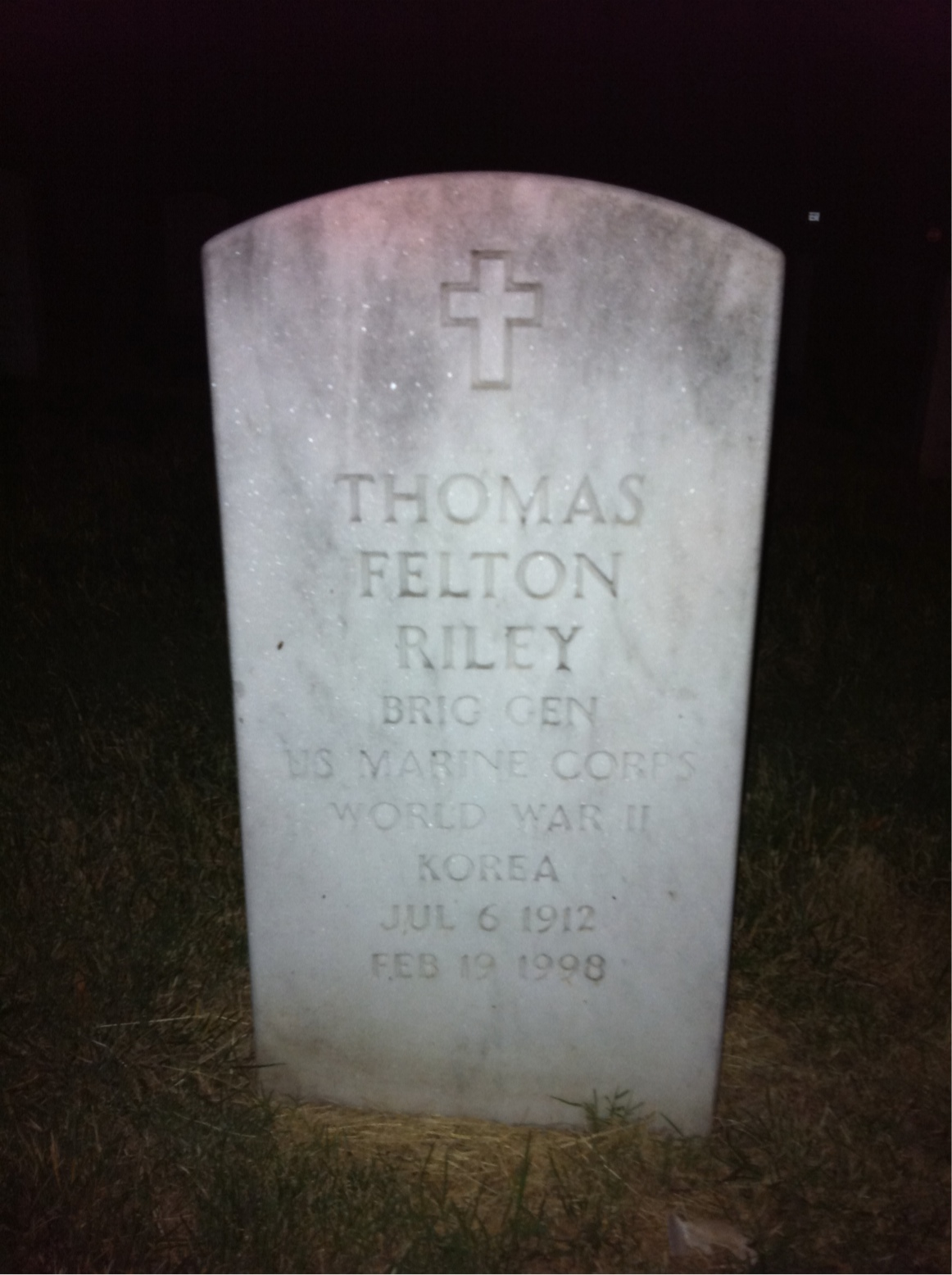
Grave at Arlington National Cemetery

During the press conference about announcement of his resignation, Riley commented:

I wish I had listened just a bit more, questioned just a bit more, and trusted just a bit less.

Riley's health began failing, his left foot was amputated in 1997, because of a severe infection worsened by diabetes. One year earlier, he was sent to the Mayo Clinic in Rochester, Minnesota, for surgery to relieve pressure on his spine, which was causing severe back and leg pain. He died after a full cardiac arrest on February 19, 1998, in his home in Newport Beach, California.

He is buried at Arlington National Cemetery, Virginia.

== Decorations ==
Here is the ribbon bar of Brigadier General Riley:

1st Row	Legion of Merit with Combat "V"		Bronze Star Medal with Combat "V"
2nd Row	Navy Commendation Medal	Navy Presidential Unit Citation	Navy Unit Commendation
3rd Row	American Defense Service Medal with "A" Device	American Campaign Medal	European–African–Middle Eastern Campaign Medal
4th Row	Asiatic-Pacific Campaign Medal with four 3/16 inch service stars	World War II Victory Medal	National Defense Service Medal with one star

== See also ==
- Battle of Guadalcanal
- Battle for Henderson Field
- Inspector General of the Marine Corps

Military offices
Preceded by James M. Masters Sr.	Inspector General of the Marine Corps; July 1, 1961 - July 1, 1964	Succeeded by Raymond L. Murray
Preceded by Edward W. Snedeker	Commanding General of the 1st Marine Division; October 8, 1959 - November 13, 1959	Succeeded by Henry R. Paige
Political offices
Preceded by Ronald Caspers	Orange County Supervisor; Fifth District; 1974–1994	Succeeded by Marian Bergeson
