= William R. Collins =

U.S. Marine Corps Major General

William Robert Collins
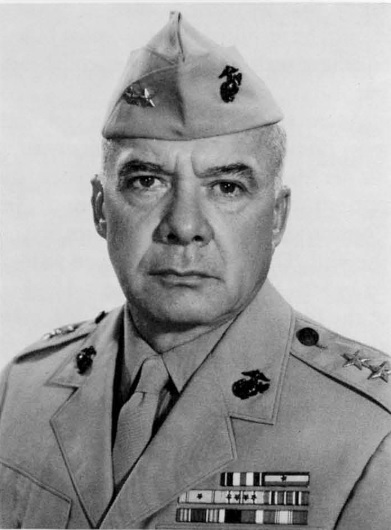
- MG William R. Collins, USMC
- Born: February 5, 1913; Washington, D.C., U.S.
- Died: October 16, 1991 (aged 78); Richmond, Virginia, U.S.
- Burial place: Arlington National Cemetery
- Military career
- Allegiance: United States
- Branch: United States Marine Corps
- Service years: 1935–1966
- Rank: Major General
- Nickname: "Rip"
- Service number: 0-5182
- Commands: 5th Tank Battalion; Iwo Jima combined armour force III Marine Expeditionary Force; 3rd Marine Division; 2nd Marine Regiment
- Conflicts: World War II; Attack on Pearl Harbor; Battle of the Coral Sea; Battle of Midway; Battle of Iwo Jima; Vietnam War
- Awards: Silver Star; Legion of Merit (2)

William Robert Collins (February 5, 1913 – October 16, 1991) was a highly decorated officer of United States Marine Corps with the rank of major general. As lieutenant colonel, Collins distinguished himself as Tank Battalion Commander during Iwo Jima battle, but he is most noted for his service as commanding general of III Marine Expeditionary Force at the beginning of Vietnam War.

== Early career ==
William R. Collins was born on February 5, 1913, in Washington, D.C., where he studied at Western High School. He graduated in summer of 1931 and enrolled the Georgetown University, where he graduated in June 1935 with Bachelor of Science degree in Foreign Service. While at university, he was a member of ROTC unit and obtained reserve army commission on June 1, 1935.

He subsequently resigned his reserve army rank in order to accept appointment as Marine Second lieutenant on September 1, 1935. Collins was ordered to the Basic School at Philadelphia Navy Yard for further officer training. With 124 students, it was the largest Basic School class to that date. This class provided two future Marine Corps Commandants (Leonard F. Chapman Jr. and Robert E. Cushman Jr.), five lieutenant generals (Lewis J. Fields, Frederick E. Leek, Herman Nickerson Jr., William J. Van Ryzin, Richard G. Weede), five major generals (Collins, William T. Fairbourn, Bruno Hochmuth, Raymond L. Murray, Carey A. Randall) and six brigadier generals (William W. Buchanan, Odell M. Conoley, Frederick P. Henderson, Roy L. Kline, John C. Miller Jr., Thomas F. Riley).

Upon the graduation in spring 1936, he was attached to the 5th Marine Regiment at Marine Corps Base Quantico, Virginia. Collins was promoted to the rank of first lieutenant in September 1938 and transferred for the instruction at Army Infantry School at Fort Benning, Georgia where he completed the tank course in June 1939. He then served as platoon leader and executive officer of 1st Tank Company at Quantico base until March 1940.

He was ordered for the gunnery school on Hawaii and following the graduation in May of that year, Collins was appointed commanding officer of the Marine detachment aboard the cruiser USS New Orleans. Collins was promoted to the rank of captain in October 1941.

== World War II ==
At the time of the Japanese attack on Pearl Harbor on December 7, 1941, New Orleans was in the dock under repair in Pearl Harbor Navy Yard. Collins took part in the defense of the ship against enemy dive bombers and later participated in the transporting of troops to Palmyra and Johnston Atolls.

In May 1942, while aboard New Orleans, Collins took part in naval battles of the Coral Sea and Midway, before he was ordered to the States in July 1942. Collins was meanwhile promoted to the rank of major in May of that year and then served as commander of the Tank School, Camp Elliott under Brigadier General Matthew H. Kingman. He was promoted to the rank of lieutenant colonel in June 1943.

Lieutenant Colonel Collins was transferred to Camp Pendleton in February 1944 and appointed commanding officer of 5th Tank Battalion, 5th Marine Division under Major General Keller E. Rockey. Collins took part in the landing exercises on San Clemente Island off the coast of Los Angeles and subsequently sailed with the 5th Division to Camp Tarawa, Hawaii for further training. Once in Hawaii the 5th tank Battalion was transferred to Schofield Barracks assigned to the Army's Chemical Warfare Service CENPAC. They were part of a top secret inter-service Flame throwing tank development group composed of Army, Navy Seabees and Marines. Units of 5th Marine Division left Hawaii at the end of January 1945, heading to its new target – Iwo Jima. Going with Lt.Col. Collins would be four M4A3 Shermans with CB-H1 (POA-CWS-H1 in Army nomenclature) flamethrowers from Schofield Barracks.

The Fifth Marine Division was attached to the V Amphibious Corps under Major General Harry Schmidt for the upcoming attack. Collins and his tanks landed early on February 19. Lt. Col. Collins aggressively directed his unit in support of the assault and despite heavy hostile fire, mine fields and terrain obstacles, helped establish the beachhead.

On February 22 when intense enemy mortar fire disrupted communications between the infantry and armor that inflected heavy casualties on the ground troops, Collins dismounted from his tank and under heavy fire established contact with the Infantry Commander. Updated on the situation, he returned to his Sherman and directed tank operations which resulted in the saving of many lives.

Following the capture of Mount Suribachi, General Schmidt ordered a drive north with three marine infantry regiments. For that attack, Schmidt consolidated the M4 Shermans from all three divisions of V Amphibious Corps: (3rd, 4th and 5th Marine Divisions) into a regimental sized armored task force with Lt. Colonel Collins as commander. It was the largest concentration of Marine armor in the war. Having only eight flame throwing tanks, he pooled them in two groups and dispatched them from their respective refueling depots. Ground commanders credited Collins flame tanks with being the best support they had in securing the island. All three tank Battalions were awarded the Presidential Unit Citation under his command. Collins received the Silver Star for gallantry on Iwo Jima.

The island was declared secured on March 26, 1945 with the division ordered back to Camp Tarawa, Hawaii for rest and refit. The 5th began preparations for Operation Downfall, but the surrender of Japan on August 15, 1945, changed the plans. Nevertheless, the division was ordered to Japan for occupation duty.

== Postwar service ==
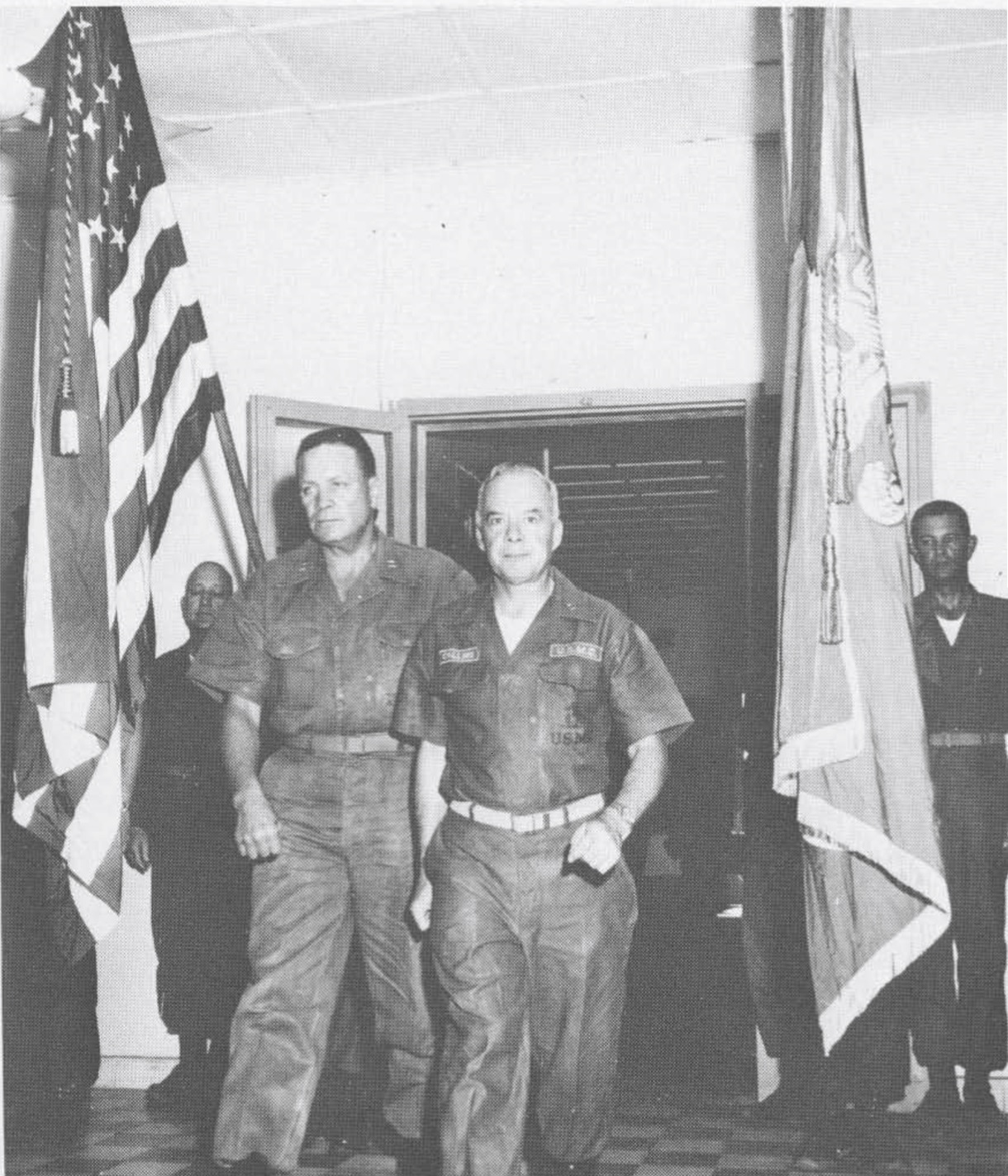
Major general William R. Collins and Major General Lewis W. Walt during III Marine Amphibious Force change of command ceremony; Da Nang, Vietnam – June 4, 1965.

Collins took part in the occupation duties in Kyushu and upon the departure of 5th Marine Division to the United States in November 1945, he remained in Japan and was transferred to 2nd Marine Division. Collins joined 6th Marine Regiment under Colonel Jack P. Juhan as Regimental Military Governor in Fukuoka. Collins was later appointed Regimental executive officer and returned to the United States in September 1946.

Upon his return stateside, Collins was ordered to San Diego, where he served as Inspector-Instructor of the 11th Reserve Tank Battalion. He was responsible for the training of Marine Corps Tank reservist until August 1948, when he was ordered for Senior Course to the Marine Corps Schools, Quantico. Collins completed the course in May 1949. He then served as operations officer and instructor within Combined Arms Section, Marine Corps Educational Center, Quantico. Collins later served as chief of staff, Landing Assault Section, Landing Force Development Center Quantico and was promoted to the rank of colonel in February 1951.

Collins was ordered for instruction to the National War College in Washington, D.C., in August 1951 and completed the course in June of the following year. He was then transferred to London, England and attached to the Joint American Advisory Group. Shortly afterward, Collins was transferred to Frankfurt, Germany and attached to the Headquarters of newly activated United States European Command under General Matthew Ridgway. He served as Staff Operations Officer, Policy Branch, Operations Division until August 1954, when he was ordered back to the States.

He returned to well known Marine Corps Educational Center, Quantico as a member of Advanced Research Group, which was tasked with the development of the recommendations on how the MAGTF should evolve structurally to meet the challenges of atomic warfare and new technologies such as helicopters and jet aircraft.

In August 1955, Collins was transferred to Camp Lejeune, North Carolina as commanding officer of 2nd Marine Regiment, 2nd Marine Division under Major General Reginald H. Ridgely. Colonel Collins supervised the landing exercise of regiment at Vieques, Puerto Rico, during the beginning of 1956.

Collins was then transferred to the staff of 2nd Division as assistant chief of staff for operations, before he assumed duties as divisional chief of staff during Operation Deep Water in September 1957, NATO naval exercise held in the Mediterranean Sea that simulated protecting the Dardanelles from a Soviet invasion. He left 2nd Marine Division in May 1958 and assumed brief duties within Personnel Board at Headquarters Marine Corps. He was ordered to the staff of Marine Corps Schools, Quantico one month later and served as president of Marine Corps Tactics and Techniques Board within Landing Force Development Center.

A highlight of his career came in November 1959, when he was promoted to the rank of brigadier general and appointed director of the Development Center. He remained in that capacity until February 1961, when assumed duty as chief of staff, Joint Task Force 4, Atlantic Command at Fort Monroe, Virginia. During the Cuban Missile Crisis in October 1962, Collins was transferred to Guantánamo Bay, Cuba, and commanded all Marine Ground Forces for eight weeks. He then served as Task Force commander from August to November 1963 and meanwhile received Master of Arts Degree at George Washington University in June 1963.

He was appointed deputy chief of staff, Atlantic Command under Admiral Harold P. Smith in December 1963, and while in this capacity, Collins was promoted to the rank of major general on January 1, 1964. For his service during Cuban Crisis and with Atlantic Command, Collins received newly established Joint Service Commendation Medal.

== Vietnam War ==
Collins was ordered to Okinawa, Japan at the beginning of June 1964 and assumed command of 3rd Marine Division a few days later. Following the Gulf of Tonkin incident in August 1964, which led to the escalation of Vietnam War, Collins began with the preparation for deployment of his division. He supervised the deployment of first elements of his division to Da Nang, Vietnam in March 1965 and ordered the construction of Marine Compound at Da Nang Air Base.

General Collins then participated in the meeting with MACV commander, General William Westmoreland in Saigon and discussed the details of Marine landing at Chu Lai. With the arrival of more 3rd Marine Division units to Vietnam, Joint Chiefs of Staff ordered the activation of III Marine Expeditionary Force on May 6, 1965, and placed Collins in command. He now held simultaneously command of 3rd Marine Division and III Marine Corps.

His units subsequently took part in the first skirmishes with Vietcong in Le My village in Quảng Nam Province. However Collins and his 13-month overseas tour was near to its end and the commandant, General Wallace M. Greene, selected recently promoted Major General Lewis W. Walt as his substitute within III Marine Expeditionary Force. Collins relinquished command to Walt on June 5, 1965, and returned to the United States. For his service in early phase of Vietnam War, Collins received the Legion of Merit with Combat "V".

Upon his return stateside in July 1965, Collins was appointed assistant chief of staff for operations at Headquarters Marine Corps. At the end of July 1966, he was appointed assistant chief of staff for intelligence and remained in that capacity until his retirement. Collins retired from the Marine Corps after 31 years of active service on November 1, 1966, and received his second Legion of Merit for service in that capacity.

Collins died on October 16, 1991, in Richmond, Virginia. He is buried together with his wife Mary Lee Griffith Collins (1914–2003) at Arlington National Cemetery, Virginia.

== Decorations ==
This is the ribbon bar of Major General William R. Collins:

1st Row	Silver Star	Legion of Merit with Combat "V" and one 5/16" Gold Star	Joint Service Commendation Medal	Navy Presidential Unit Citation with one star
2nd Row	American Defense Service Medal with Base Clasp	American Campaign Medal	Asiatic-Pacific Campaign Medal with four 3/16" service stars	World War II Victory Medal
3rd Row	Navy Occupation Service Medal	National Defense Service Medal with one star	Vietnam Service Medal with one 3/16" service star	Vietnam Campaign Medal

=== Silver Star citation ===
Citation:

The President of the United States of America takes pleasure in presenting the Silver Star to Lieutenant Colonel William R. Collins (MCSN: 0-5182), United States Marine Corps, for conspicuous gallantry and intrepidity as Commanding Officer of the Fifth Tank Battalion, FIFTH Marine Division in action against enemy Japanese forces on Iwo Jima, Volcano Islands from 19 February to 26 March 1945. After landing with his Battalion early on D-Day, Lieutenant Colonel Collins aggressively directed his unit in supporting the assault troops and despite heavy hostile fire, mine fields and terrain obstacles, sided materially in the establishment of the initial beach head. On 22 February when intense enemy mortar fire disrupted communications between the infantry and supporting tanks and caused heavy casualties among the front line troops, he dismounted from his tank and braved the heavy fire to contact the Infantry Commander and establish liaison. Receiving information on the situation, he returned to his vehicle and directed effective tank operations which resulted in the saving of many lives. By his courageous leadership and skilled tactics Lieutenant Colonel Collins contributed materially to the successful accomplishment of the Division's mission and his devotion to duty was in keeping with the highest traditions of the United States Naval Service.

== See also ==
- Battle of Iwo Jima

Military offices
Preceded by Unit activated	Commanding General of III Marine Expeditionary Force; May 6, 1965 - June 5, 1965	Succeeded by Lewis W. Walt
Preceded by James M. Masters Sr.	Commanding General of 3rd Marine Division; June 17, 1964 - June 5, 1965	Succeeded by Lewis W. Walt
