= Herreshoff family =

American naval architect family

Members of the Herreshoff (her-res-hoff, no stressed syllable) family of Bristol, Rhode Island, were, among other things, notable naval architects, naval industrialists, industrial chemists, and automobile designers and manufacturers.

== Selected members ==
Charles Frederick Herreshoff III (1809–1888) – on April 15, 1833, in Boston – married Julia Ann Lewis (1811–1901). Charles graduated from Brown University in 1828.

❶ James Brown F. Herreshoff (1834–1930), a serial inventor and a chemist

1. Charles Frederick Herreshoff (1880–1954)

❹ John Brown Herreshoff (1841–1915), blind yacht builder, co-founder and sales manager of the Herreshoff Manufacturing Company. He married twice, first, in 1870, to Sarah Lucas Kilton (maiden; 1836–1906), then, in 1892, to Eugenia Tams Tucker (maiden; 1857–1940). J.B. Herreshoff was close friends with General Ambrose Everett Burnside (1824–1881).
❼ Captain Nathanael Greene Herreshoff (1848–1938), seventh child born to C.F. Herreshoff. American boat designer. Married Clara Anna DeWolf (maiden; 1853–1905)

1. Algernon Sidney DeWolf Herreshoff (1886–1977), MIT class of 1911, naval architect
  1. Nathanael Greene Herreshoff III (1931–2025)
  2. Halsey Chase Herreshoff (born 1933)
2. Lewis Francis Herreshoff (1890–1972), American boat designer, marine engineer
3. Nathanael Greene Herreshoff II
  1. Clara DeWolf Herreshoff (1920-1983)
  2. Natalie Warren Herreshoff (1924-2002)

❽ John Brown Francis Herreshoff (1850–1932), chemist

1. Louise Chamberlain Herreshoff (1876–1967), artist
2. Sarah Lothrop Herreshoff (1889–1958)
  1. Guido Borgianni (it) (1914–2011), Sarah's son, Italian artist, identified as having been part of the Macchiaioli movement

=== Family tree; selected members ===
Herreshoff family of Bristol, Rhode Island
(partial chart showing selected family members only – C.F. Herreshoff III and Julia Ann Lewis had nine children)

Minden, Germany –––––––––––––––––––– Karl Frederick Herreshoff (1739 – c. 1775)	Minden, Germany –––––––––––––––––––– Agnes Mühlner Brown (1742–1766)
Old Forge –––––––––––––––––––– Charles Frederick Herreshoff II (1763–1819)	Old Forge –––––––––––––––––––– Sarah Brown (1773–1846)
Bristol –––––––––––––––––––– Charles Frederick Herreshoff III (1809–1888)	Bristol –––––––––––––––––––– Julia Ann Lewis (1811–1901)
❶ James Brown F. Herreshoff (1834–1930)	❷ Caroline "Carrie" Louisa Herreshoff (1837–1908)	❹ John Brown Herreshoff (1841–1915)	❼ Nathanael Greene Herreshoff (1848–1938)	Clara Anna DeWolf (1853–1905)	Grace Eugenia Dyer (1851–1880)	❽ John Brown Francis Herreshoff (1850–1932) –––––––––––––––––––– Four marriages: m1. Dyer 1876 until her death m2. Lee 1882 to 1919	Emaline Duval ("Mildred") Lee (1863–1930)	❾ Julian Lewis Herreshoff (1854–1919)
Charlotte Virginia Townsend (1897–1988)	Edna May Burt (1886–1937)	Charles Frederick Herreshoff (1876–1954) –––––––––––––––––––– m1. McCormick 1902–1912 m2. Burt 1912 m3. Townsend 1945	Elizabeth Harrison McCormick (1884–1938)	Lloyd Stowell Shapley (1875–1959) –––––––––––––––––––– Three marriages m1. McCormick 1912 until her death m2. 1943 Ida Viola Wells until her death	Algernon Sidney DeWolf Herreshoff (1886–1977)	Rebecca Chase (1894–1991)	Lewis Francis Herreshoff; 1890–1972)	Louise Chamberlain Herreshoff (1876–1967)	Frederick Herreshoff (1888–1920)	Luigi Masnada (1879–1958)	Sarah Lothrop Herreshoff (1889–1958) –––––––––––––––––––– m1. Masnada 1909 divorced Masnada 1914 m2. Borgianni 1927	Roberto Borgianni –––––––––––––––––––– (Guido's foster-, adoptive-, or step-father)
Alan Shapley (1903–1973)	Halsey Chase Herreshoff (born 1933)	Nathanael Greene Herreshoff III (1931–2025)	Elisa Masnada (born 1911)	Guido Borgianni (it) (1914–2011)

=== Other children of C.F. Herreshoff III and Julia Ann Lewis ===
❸ Charles Frederick Herreshoff (1839–1917)
❺ Lewis Herreshoff (1844–1926)
❻ Sally Brown Herreshoff (1845–1917)

== Blindness among siblings ==
Of the seven sons and two daughters of C.F. Herreshoff and Julia Ann Lewis, four were blind:

❹ John Brown Herreshoff (1841–1915), who became blind at age 16, founded – in 1878 with his brother Nat – the Herreshoff Manufacturing Company and was president and treasurer for thirty-seven years. Despite being blind, he was a renowned designer of yachts.
❺ Lewis Herreshoff (1844–1926) became blind at about age 14. He studied music in Paris and authored literary work in American periodicals.
❻ Sally Brown Herreshoff (1845–1917) became blind at a young age.
❾ Julian Lewis Herreshoff (1854–1919), who, among other things, from 1886 to about 1888, studied music at the University of Berlin where he became proficient in music and foreign languages. When he returned to Rhode Island, he established the Westminster School of Languages and Music, in Providence.

== Gallery ==
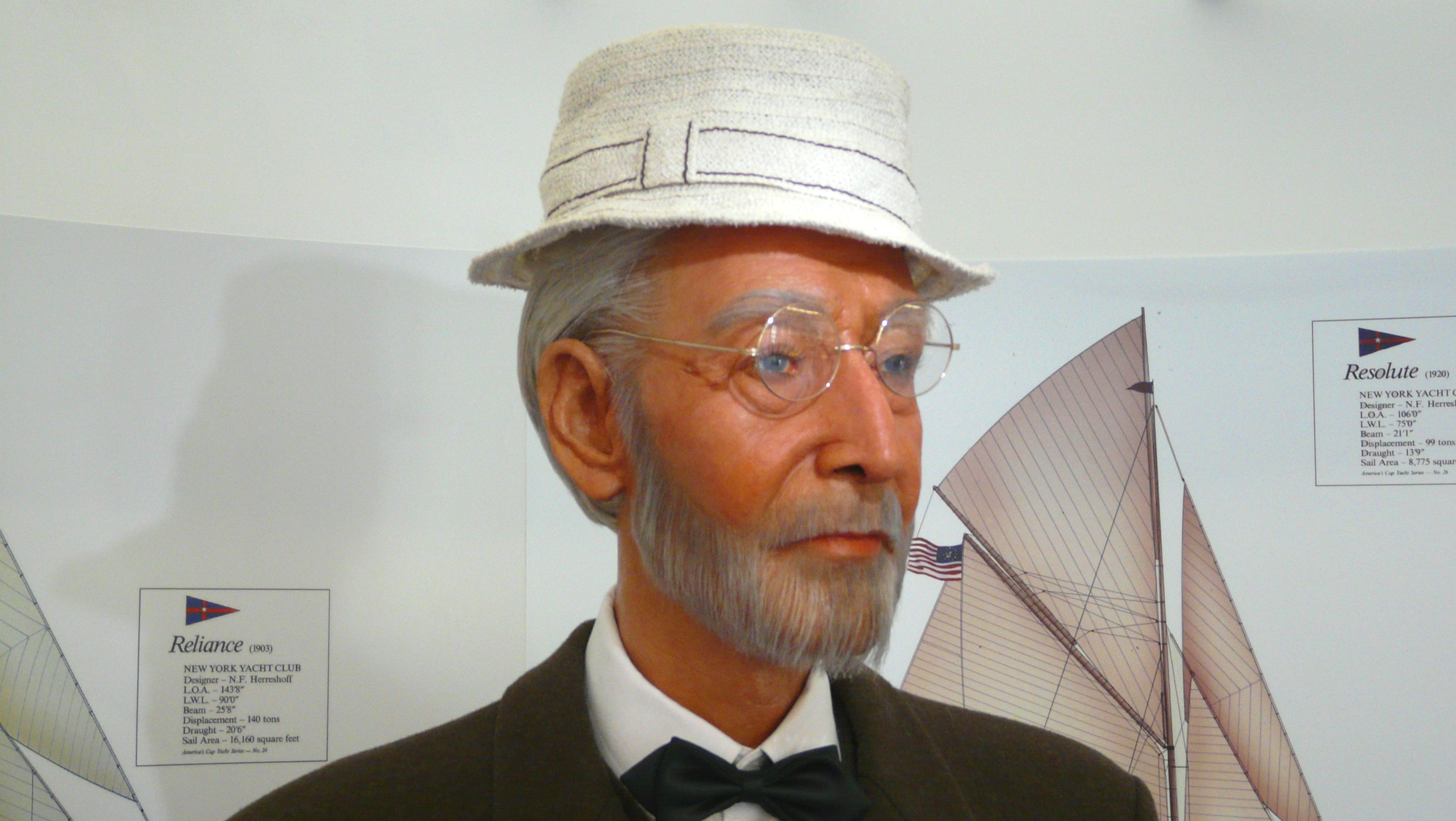
Model of Nathanael Greene Herreshoff
(1848–1938)

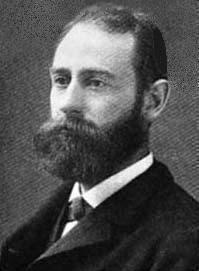
Nathanael Greene Herreshoff
(1848–1938)

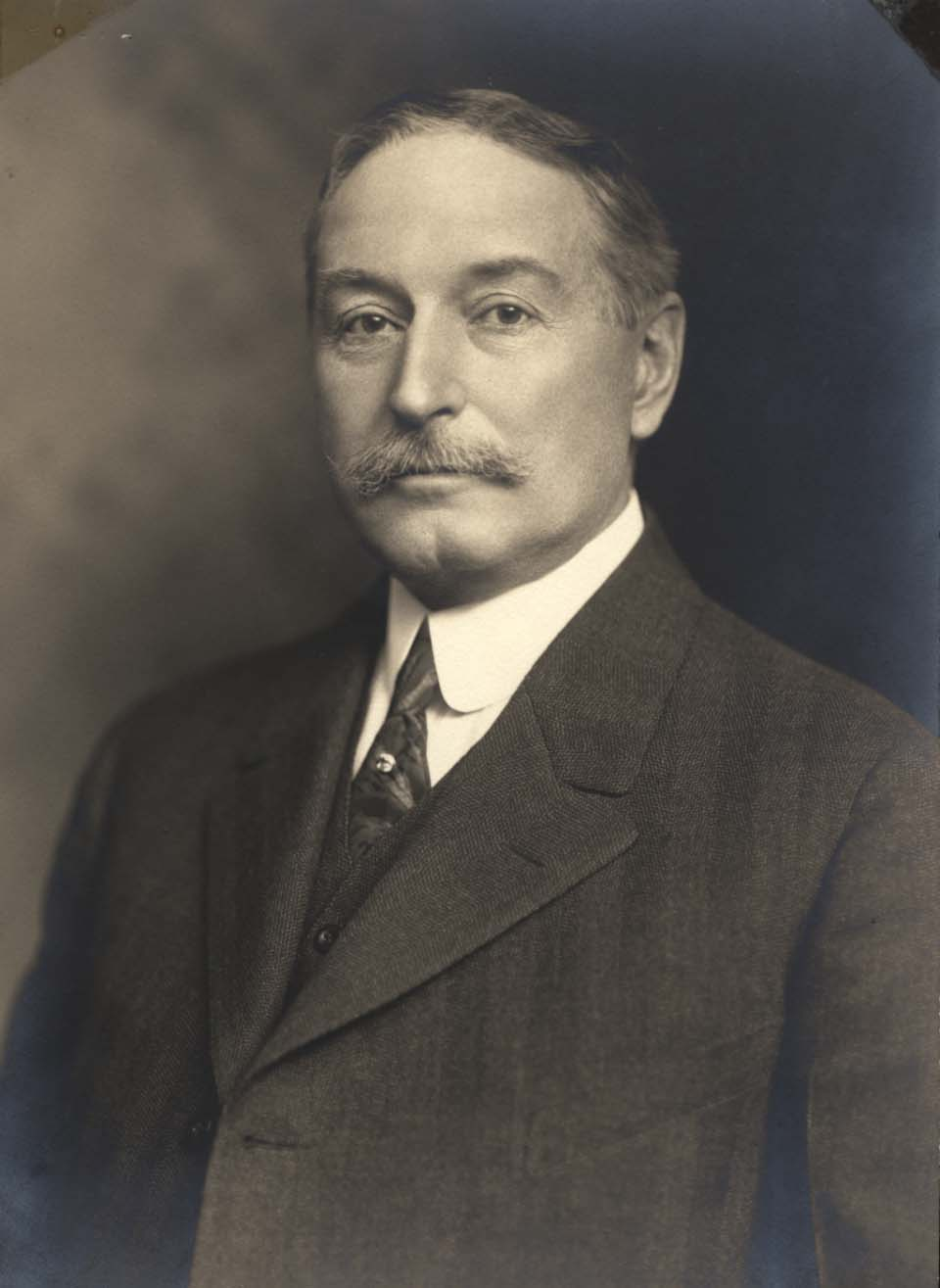
John Brown Francis Herreshoff
(1850–1932)

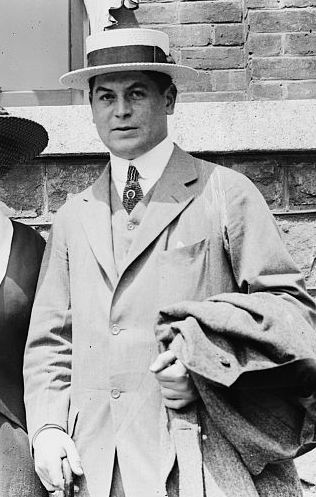
Fred Herreshoff
(1888–1920)

Lewis Francis Herreshoff
(1890–1972)

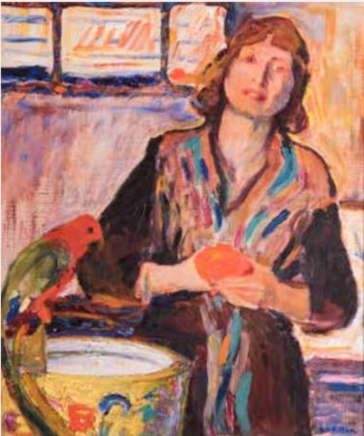
Louise Chamberlain Herreshoff
(1876–1967)

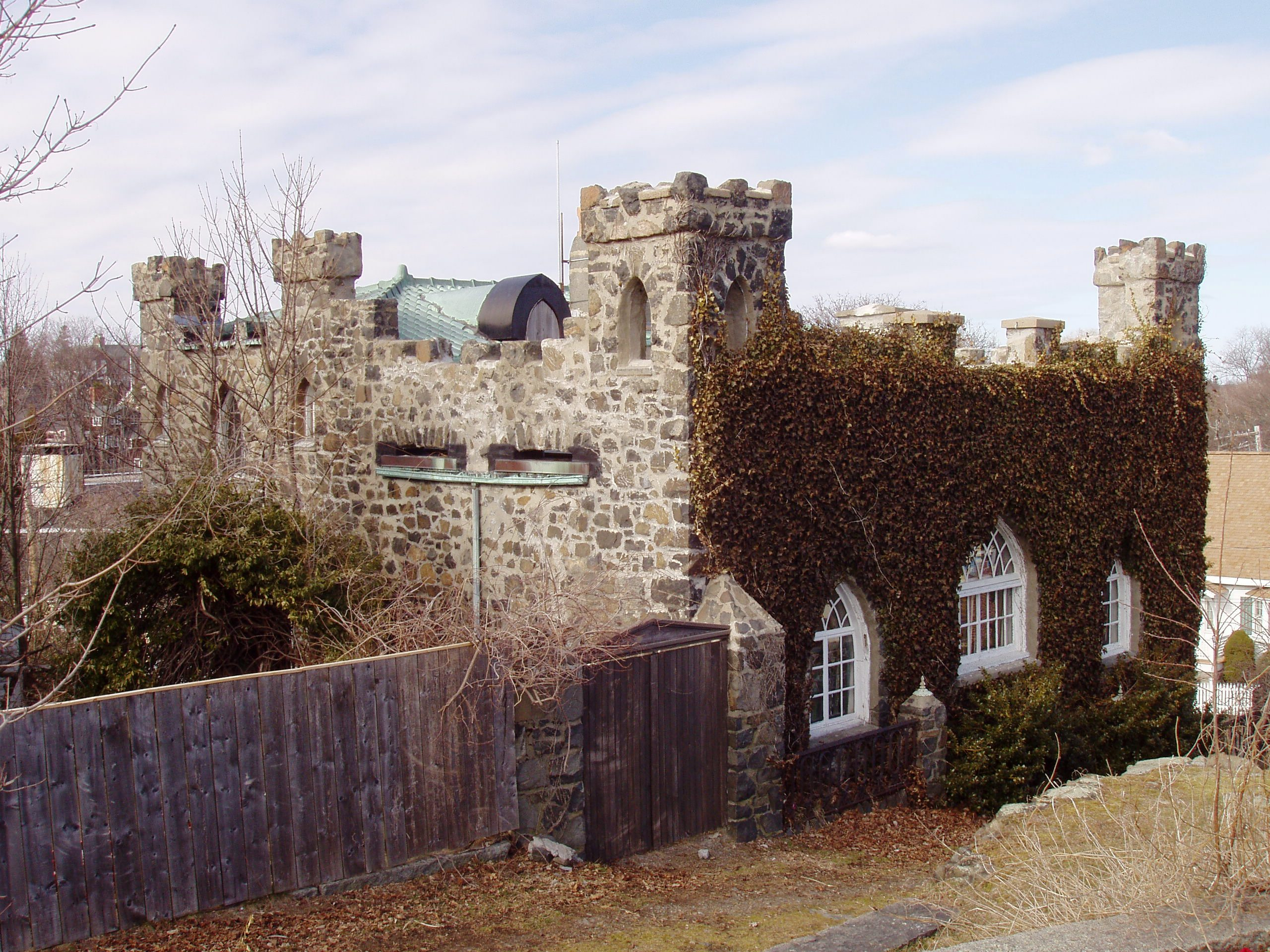
Herreshoff Castle, Marblehead, Massachusetts

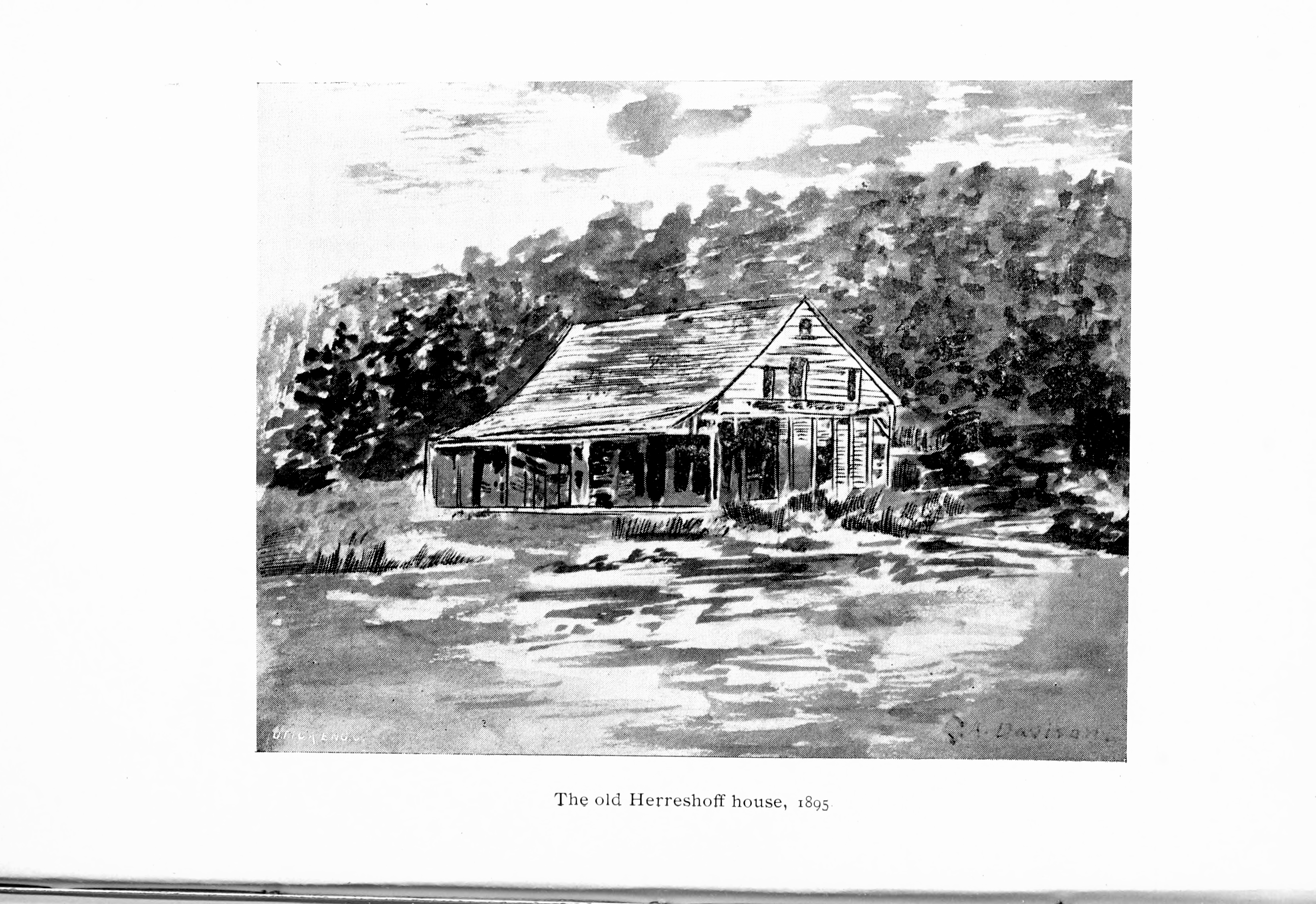
House of Charles Frederick Herreshoff II (1763–1819), Old Forge, New York

== Extended family and distant ancestors ==
Charles Frederick Herreshoff III (1809–1888), by way of his mother, Sarah Brown (maiden; 1773–1846), was a grandson of John Brown (1736–1803), merchant, slaveholder, and statesman from Providence, who, with his brothers – Nicholas (1729–1791), Joseph (1733–1785), and Moses (1738–1836), an abolitionist – was instrumental in (i) founding Brown University and (ii) moving it to their family's former land in Providence. Julia Ann Lewis (maiden; 1811–1901), by way of her father, Joseph Warren Lewis (1774–1844), was a granddaughter of Winslow Lewis (1770–1850) of Wellfleet, Massachusetts, a sea captain, engineer, inventor, and contractor active in the construction of many American lighthouses during the first half of the nineteenth century. Julian Ann Lewis is also a niece of Isaiah William Penn Lewis (1808–1955) (Winslow Lewis' nephew), who was also a lighthouse designer, builder, and engineer.

By way of his mother, Sarah Brown (maiden; 1773–1846), C.F Herreshoff III was a 4th great-grandson of Rev. Chad Brown, the progenitor of the Brown family of Rhode Island.

Chad Brown (c. 1600–1650) & Elizabeth Sharparowe (1604–1672)
John Brown I (1627–1677) & Mary Holmes (1628–1680) son, et ux.
James Brown Elder (1662–1719) & Mary Tew Harris (1671–1736) grandson, et ux.
Capt. James Brown II (1697–1739) & Hope Tillinghast Power (1702–1792) great-grandson, et ux.
John Brown (1736–1803) & Sarah Beckworth (1738–1825); 2nd great-grandson, et ux. ← Brown University
Sarah Brown (1773–1846) & Charles Frederick Herreshoff (1763–1819); 3rd great-grandson, et ux.
Charles Frederick Herreshoff III (1809–1888); 4th great-grandson

Nowadays, tens of millions of Americans have at least one ancestor who was in Rhode Island around 1600. But, with respect to males descending from Chad Brown, according to Galton-Watson probability, only a fraction of that number have an unbroken chain of paternal lineage maintaining the Brown surname from his line.

== See also ==
- Herreshoff Marine Museum
- Herreshoff (automobile)

== Bibliography ==
=== References ===
News media

- La Repubblica (January 4, 2011). "È morto il pittore Borgianni" [Borgianni, the Painter, Dead] (Obituary) (in Italian). ISSN 0390-1076.
- Legacy.com (November 27, 2025). Obituary: "Nathanael Greene Herreshoff III". Published on Legacy.com by Perinchief Chapels – Mount Holly, New Jersey, November 27, 2025. Archived from the original on December 10, 2025.
- New York Times (The). LCCN sn00-61556; ISSN 0362-4331, ISSN 1553-8095 (online).
1. "Yachtsman Herreshoff an Auto Builder". Vol. 58, no. 18572. November 29, 1908. p. 4 (digital image 28; section 4, columns 5–6).
  1. Via NYTimes blog.
  2. Via TimesMachine.
  3. Pdf via TimesMachine (Digital scan).
  4. Permalink via TimesMachine.
  5. Pfd (Digital scan) – via FultonHistory.com.
2. "Dr. J.B. Herreshoff Chemist, 81, Dies – Past President of American Chemical Society – Family Noted as Yacht Builders – His Work Won Distinction First American to Receive the Perkin Medal – Invented Process for Making Sulphuric Acid" (Obituary). Vol. 81, no. 27035. January 31, 1932. p. 29.
  1. Via NYTimes blog.
  2. Via TimesMachine.
  3. Pdf via TimesMachine (Digital scan).
  4. Permalink via TimesMachine.
- St. Albans Daily Messenger (February 16, 1926). "Herreshoff Dead" (Obituary; AP). p. 2. LCCN sn93063663. OCLC 11932116 – via Newspapers.com.
- World (The) (March 17, 1895). They Build Fast Yachts – The Herreshoffs, of Bristol, Seem to Have Inherited Their Genius – Nat Designs for the Family – But the Suggestions of the Blind Brother John Are Invaluable. Vol. 35. p. 10 – via Newspapers.com.

Books, journals, magazines, and papers

- Bicknell, Thomas Williams (1920). "Lewis Herreshoff". The History of the State of Rhode Island and Providence Plantations – Biographical. Vol. 4. New York: American Historical Society. pp. 324–330. LCCN 20009789 – via Google Books.
- Byron-Curtiss, Arthur Lester (1897). The Life and Adventures of Nat Foster, Trapper and Hunter of the Adirondacs. Utica, New York: Thomas Jay Griffiths. pp. 245–252 – via Internet Archive.
- Cutter, William Richard, ed. (1913). "Herreshoff". New England Families – Genealogical and Memorial – A Record of the Achievements of Her People in the Making of Commonwealths and the Founding of a Nation. Vol. 1. New York: Lewis Historical Publishing Company. OCLC 144570203 – via Google Books.
- Funk, Charles Earle (1938). "Herreshoff, Nathaniel G.". What's the Name, Please? A Guide to the Correct Pronunciation of Current Prominent Names. New York: Funk & Wagnalls. p. 79. OCLC 579091780 – via Google Books.
- George, Rosemary (2005) [2004]. Treading Grapes: Walking Through the Vineyards of Tuscany. Bantam Books. ISBN 0-5538-1500-8. OCLC 1008855113 – via Google Books.
- "Herreshoff". Representative Men and Old Families of Rhode Island. Vol. 1. Chicago: J.H. Beers & Co. 1908. pp. 613–617 – via Internet Archive.
- Herreshoff, Lewis (August 1891). "Possibilities of the Steam Yacht". The North American Review. Vol. 153, no. 417. pp. 172–180. ISSN 0029-2397. JSTOR 25102227. OCLC 5543846225 – via Google Books. (The North American Review is also accessible via the HathiTrust Digital Library).
- Herreshoff, Lewis (August 1891). "The Evolution of the Yacht". The North American Review. Vol. 153, no. 419. pp. 432–441. ISSN 0029-2397. JSTOR 25102260. OCLC 5543841099 – via Google Books. (The North American Review is also accessible via the HathiTrust Digital Library).
- Florino, L. (July 25, 1972). "Sezione I civile; sentenza 25 luglio 1972, n. 2532; Pres. Giannattasio P., Est. Brancaccio, P. M. Sciaraffia (concl. conf.); Borgianni G. (Avv. Mauro, Nicolò) c. Masnada (Avv. Porzio, Monti, Corti), Boncompagni (Avv. Capano), Luporini, Eredità giacente Borgianni R.F.". Il Foro Italiano [The Italian Forum] (Legal treatise) (in Italian). 95: 3035–3044. ISSN 0015-783X. JSTOR 23166410. (the text pertains to heirship for the purpose of inheritance, and, in doing so, mentions dates of marriages, births, divorces, and deaths of subjects in this article – in one case, it links Guido Borgianni to John B.F. Herreshoff; Il Foro Italiano was founded in 1876 by Enrico Scialoja)
- Johnson, Edwin Rossiter; Brown, John Howard, eds. (1904). The Twentieth Century Biographical Dictionary of Notable Americans. Vol. 5: Habb—Izard. Boston: The Biographical Society – via Google Books.
- Marden, Orison Swett, ed. (1901). "Chapter 17 – Herreshoff, the Yacht Builder". How They Succeeded – Life Stories of Successful Men Told by Themselves. Boston: Lothrop Publishing Company. pp. 276–303. OCLC 2533927 – via Internet Archive.
- "L. Francis Herreshoff Collection: Manuscripts Collection 138". Mystic Seaport Museum. OCLC 46971849.
- Simpson, Richard Vernon (2013) [2007]. Herreshoff Yachts: Seven Generations of Industrialists, Inventors and Ingenuity in Bristol. Charleston, South Carolina: The History Press. p. 16. ISBN 978-1-5962-9306-9. OCLC 122701540.
