= Herreshoff =

Herreshoff may refer to:

- Herreshoff (surname), a German surname
- Herreshoff (automobile), any of three models of automobile built by the U.S. manufacturer Herreshoff Motor Company, 1909–14
- Herreshoff Bull's Eye
- Herreshoff Castle, an unusual residence in Marblehead, Massachusetts
- Herreshoff family
- Herreshoff Marine Museum
- USS Herreshoff No. 306 (SP-1841)
- USS Herreshoff No. 308 (SP-2232)
- USS Herreshoff No. 309 (SP-1218)
- USS Herreshoff No. 321 (SP-2235)
- USS Herreshoff No. 322 (SP-2373)
- USS Herreshoff No. 323 (SP-2840)
- Herreshoff 31
- Herreshoff 12½
