= Herreshoff (surname) =

Herreshoff is a German surname. For the Herreshoff line from Bristol, Rhode Island, the surname is pronounced her-res-hoff, with no stressed syllable.

Herreshoff family (the below are all related)

1. Charles Frederick Herreshoff III (1809–1888)
  1. James Brown F. Herreshoff (1834–1930), American inventor and chemist, son
    1. Charles Frederick Herreshoff (1880–1954), American automobile designer and manufacturer, son
  2. Nathanael Greene Herreshoff (1848–1938), American boat designer, son
    1. Algernon Sidney DeWolf Herreshoff (1886–1977), MIT class of 1911, naval architect, son
      1. Halsey Chase Herreshoff (born 1933), son
    2. Lewis Francis Herreshoff (1890–1972), American boat designer, son
  3. John Brown Francis Herreshoff (1850–1932), American metallurgical chemist, son
    1. Louise Herreshoff (1876–1967), American painter, daughter
    2. Fred Herreshoff (1888–1920), national class American amateur golfer, son
