= John Brown Herreshoff =

American boat builder

- Born: April 24, 1841; Bristol, Rhode Island
- Died: July 20, 1915 (aged 74); Bristol, Rhode Island
- Other names: J.B., "the blind boat builder"
- Occupation(s): Naval architect, co-founder and sales manager of Herreshoff Manufacturing company
- Spouse(s): Sarah Lucas Kilton (m. 1870); Eugenia Tams Tucker (m. 1892)
- Children: Katherine Kilton
- Relatives: brother Nathanael Greene Herreshoff, brother James Brown Herreshoff, brother John Brown Francis Herreshoff, nephew Charles Frederick Herreshoff, nephew Lewis Francis Herreshoff

John Brown "J.B." Herreshoff (April 24, 1841 – July 20, 1915) was an American boat builder and businessman. He, along with his younger brother, Nathanael "Nat" Greene Herreshoff, founded Herreshoff Manufacturing Company.

== Biography ==
John Brown Herreshoff was the son of Charles Frederick Herreshoff and Julia Ann Lewis. He was born on April 24, 1841, in Bristol, Rhode Island, at Point Pleasant Farm on Poppasquash Neck. He was the fourth of nine children and the third of seven sons.

J.B. took an interest in boats immediately. When he was young, he would whittle out toy ships with a knife. He built his first seaworthy boat, Meteor, when he was fifteen. As a boy, he demonstrated his ingenuity in other ways as well. By the time he was thirteen, he had created a rope walk where he made and sold ropes. Not much later, he set up a machine shop with many tools, including a lathe, which he used to shape wood.

When John Brown Herreshoff was seven years old, he lost sight in one eye due to an illness. He went blind in the other eye when he was fifteen, after an accident in a game he had been playing with his brother Charles. Although this had a heavy impact on his life and his capabilities, it did not stop him from pursuing a career in crafting ships, and he earned the nickname "the blind boat builder". John became so good at navigating his disability that he was often accused of pretending to be blind.

J.B. constructed small boats independently for some time, with occasional help from either his father or his brother Nat. In 1864 he started a firm with Dexter S. Stone, called Herreshoff and Stone. The business built all types of boats; the partnership dissolved two years later.

In 1878, J.B. joined efforts with his younger brother Nathanael, who was a naval architect and steam engineer. Together they created Herreshoff Manufacturing Company.

John Brown Herreshoff died on July 20, 1915.

== Herreshoff Manufacturing Company ==
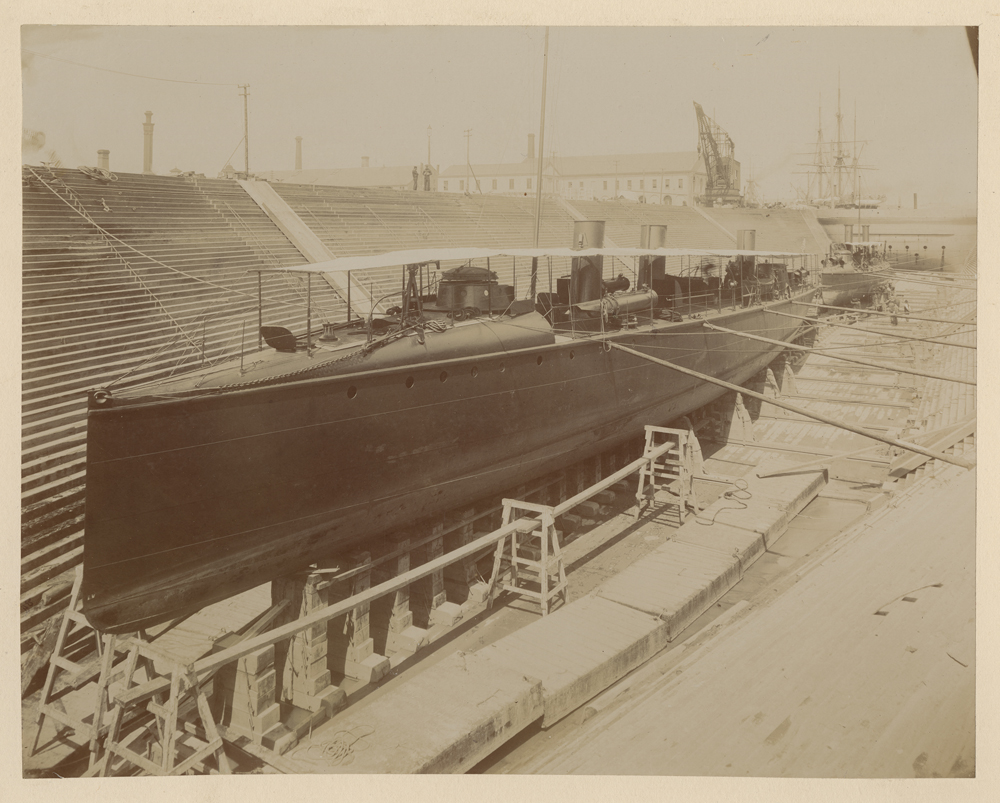
Herreshoff Torpedo Boat

John Brown Herreshoff and Nathanael Greene Herreshoff set up their boat building business in Bristol, Rhode Island. They procured several of the buildings on Burnside Street, as well as the space on the waterfront below it.

In the firm that the Herreshoff brothers created, John took the position of president of the company, while Nathanael was general superintendent and designer. The two of them worked well together. When constructing sailboats, J.B. would come up with the design of a ship and describe it verbally to Nat. Nat would then build a model for J.B. to feel, and by doing this, John was able to find any imperfections that there might have been and have them changed. As the company continued to grow, J.B. handed most of the designing and construction work over to Nat and took up managing all the business aspects of the company instead.

John Brown became known for his outstanding memory and his ability to understand boats without seeing them. One of the duties that he took over within the Herreshoff Manufacturing Company was the position of sales manager. He had an uncanny talent for estimating costs of new yachts nearly perfectly. Nat would explain to him the details of a boat that had yet to be built, and J.B. would guess at how much it would cost. After the boat's construction was finished, the final price of the boat would be practically the same as what J.B. had guessed. He was also quite good at carrying out sales transactions: when asked questions about cost, he would answer them very quickly.

At the outset of the Herreshoff Manufacturing Company, John and Nathanael focused their attentions on building steamships. As Nat had a degree from the Massachusetts Institute of Technology in mechanical engineering, they were able to build the engines and boilers themselves. The company grew vastly in size and popularity as a result of the steam vessels that it produced. When J.B. had been working independently, he had about twenty employees. When building steamships, Herreshoff Manufacturing Company grew to have about 400. Crafting steam powered vessels brought other advancements to the company as well. Together, John and Nathanael made improvements to the coil-boiler that their brother James Brown Herreshoff had invented. They also built steam torpedo boats for the U.S. Navy and for the governments of Great Britain, Russia, Spain, and Peru. The passenger steamboats that the company produced were known for their speed. Designed by Nat, the boats were not built until John had approved it, and he was always involved in their creation. During his time working with steamships, John became very familiar with engines. He developed the ability to discover the cause of issues in engines solely through his senses of hearing and touch.

While steamship production did much to build up Herreshoff Manufacturing Company, the sailboats that it created truly earned the business its fame. Herreshoff sailing vessels were renowned for their speed. The company built many wooden yachts and sold them to prominent figures of the time, including J. P. Morgan, many of the Vanderbilts, and Jay Gould. The Herreshoff brothers also built five America's Cup defenders: Vigilant, Defender, Columbia, Reliance, and Resolute.

The site of the Herreshoff Marine Museum is where the Herreshoff Manufacturing Company was. Some buildings are still used for boat construction and restoration. Others are used for teaching boat building and sailing classes.

== Notable vessels ==
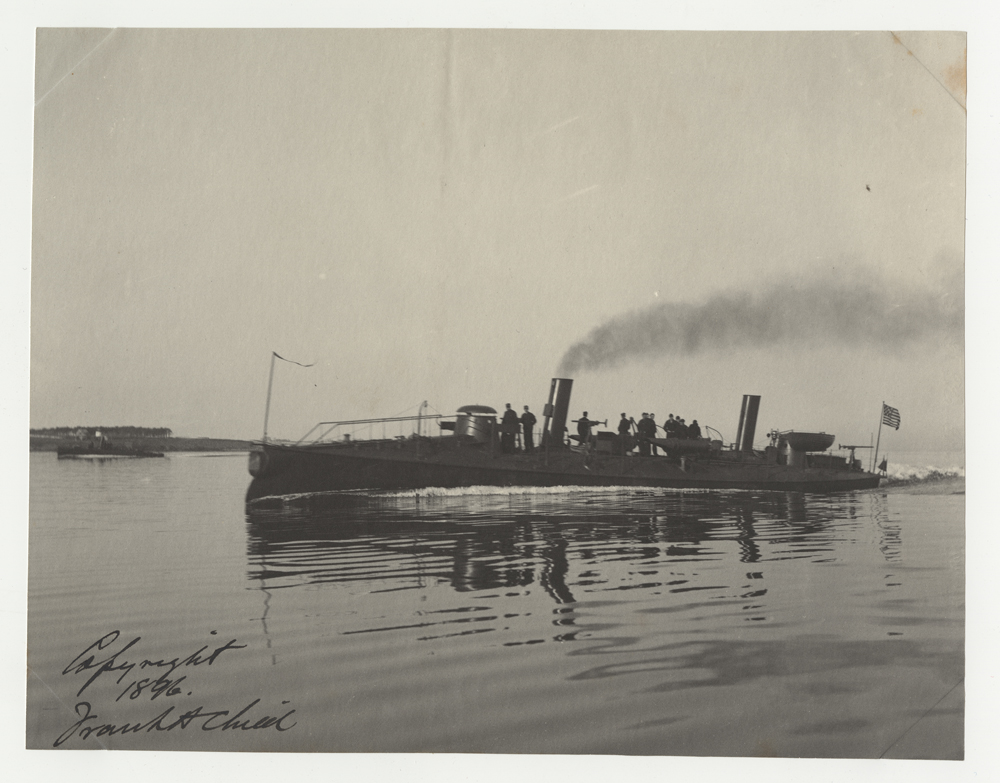
USS Stiletto

=== Steam vessels ===
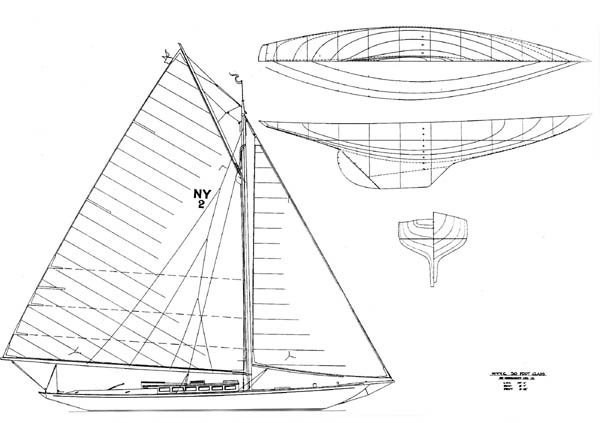
New York 30 Class Design

- Lightning—the U.S. Navy's first purpose-built torpedo boat—1876.
- Stiletto, 1885

=== Sailing vessels ===
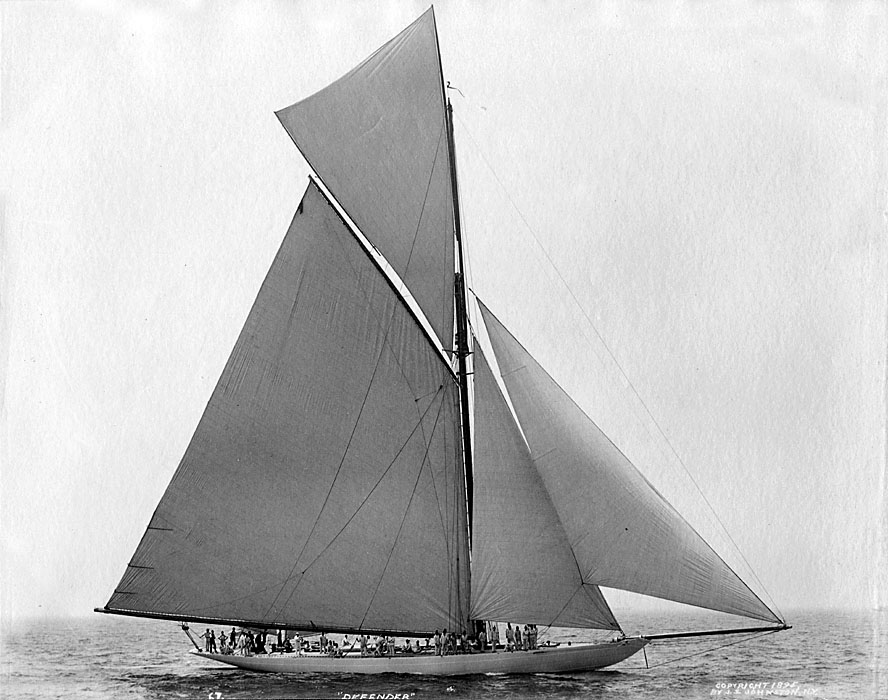
Herreshoff America's Cup Winner, Defender

Herreshoff Manufacturing Company created hundreds of their own sailing vessel designs. Among those designs, they invented quite a few one-design classes of sailboats. This includes:

- Herreshoff 12' 1/2
- New York 30's
- New York 40's
- New York 50's
- S Boats
- 15 Footers

Other notable sailboats built by the Herreshoff brothers include the Amaryllis (1876), for which they received the first U.S. patent for a catamaran.

=== America's Cup defenders ===
Between the years of 1893 and 1920, the Herreshoff brothers built a series of undefeated America's Cup defenders:

- Vigilant, 1893
- Defender, 1895
- Columbia, 1899 & 1901
- Reliance, 1903
- Resolute, 1920
