= Doris (sailing yacht) =

- U.S. National Register of Historic Places
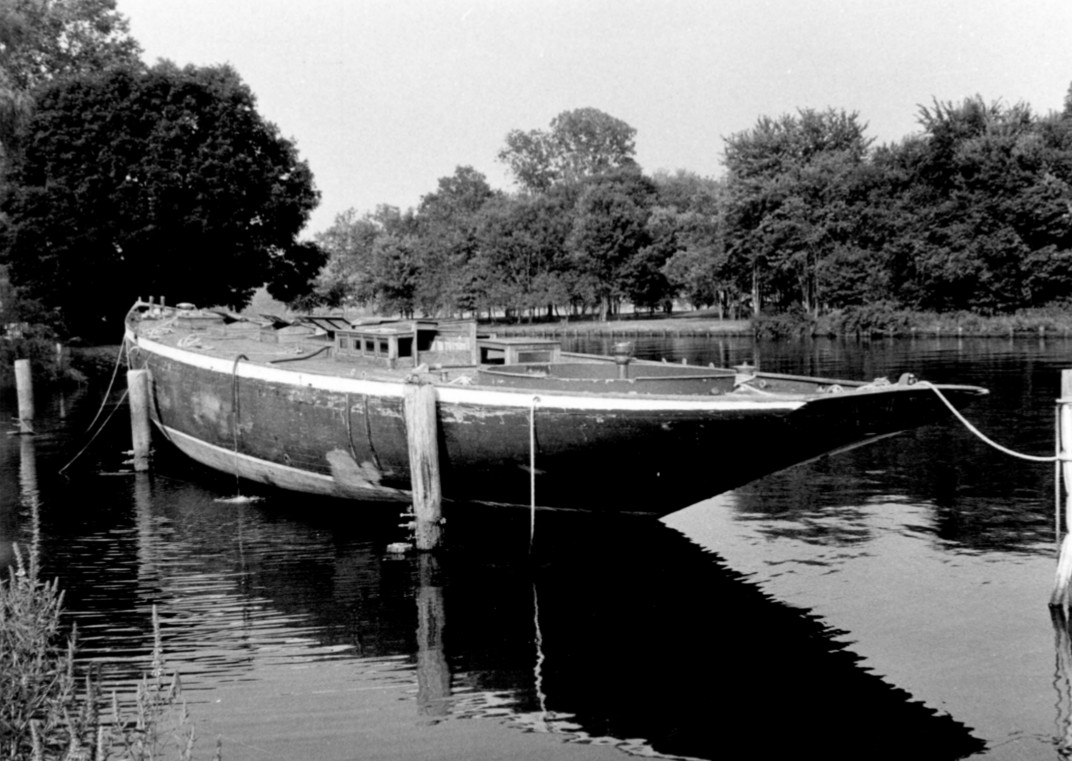
- 1983 photo

- Location within Connecticut Location within the United States
- Location: Connecticut River off River Road, Deep River, Connecticut
- Coordinates: 41°23′0″N 72°23′34″W
- Area: less than 1 acre (0.40 ha)
- Built: 1905 and 1934
- Architect: N.G. Herreshoff; Herreshoff Manufacturing Co.
- NRHP reference No.: 84001108
- Added to NRHP: May 31, 1984

Doris is a sailing yacht, which has also been known as Astarte, Huntress, and Vayu, in Deep River, Connecticut that was listed on the National Register of Historic Places in 1984. She was designed by Nathanael Herreshoff, who designed five America's Cup defender yachts and who also was the main architect of the America's Cup rule change called the Universal Rule. That rule allowed for displacement as well as length and sail area to be included in a formula defining yacht eligibility, and enabled more "sea-kindly" and roomier yachts to be competitive. The vessel known as Doris was constructed with a primary emphasis on speed and novelty, representing an avant-garde design that was highly appreciated in her era. She participated in a plethora of prestigious regattas and races, including the Annual Cruise of the New York Yacht Club and the Newport-Bermuda Race, showcasing her remarkable agility and endurance.

As the years went by, Doris was passed from owner to owner, each making alterations and updates to the vessel in various ways. In 1984, her tremendous contributions to the world of yachting were recognized when she was inscribed into the National Register of Historic Places. Doris remains an exceptional and precious manifestation of Herreshoff's oeuvre, and she is adored by sailing enthusiasts and historians worldwide. Previously, America Cup racers were often "either sleek and fast, but had unseaworthy characteristics, or scow-like vessels which were cumbersome but safe and able passage-makers." Doris is believed to be the largest Herreshoff-designed sloop that was built and has survived, at 78 feet. She is said to be the first boat built under the Universal Rule.

Built in Bristol, Rhode Island, in 1904, by the Herreshoff Manufacturing Co., Doris is the largest all-wood vessel ever built by the firm. The ship was commissioned by S. Reed Anthony, a founding partner of investment banking firm Tucker, Anthony & Co., who paid $18,000. She soon proved her worth, as Doris "... proved to be a sensation in the yachting world when she defeated Gloriana, an earlier Herreshoff design built in 1891 and reported to be the fastest sailing vessel of her day, in a series of match races off Marblehead, Massachusetts." The ship is also unusual for two construction details. Herreshoff employed metal hanging knees instead of the more traditional sheer clamp, and Doris is the only boat to possess what Herreshoff called "belt" or "web frames", whereby oak frames were bent "over the ceiling".

Although originally rigged as a gaff-sloop/cutter, the rigging was changed prior to the 1932 Bermuda Race. This proved to be advantageous, as the yacht led the race "for a good part of the race before light winds gave favor to the smaller vessels." In 1934, under the ownership of Lawrence Lowell Reeve, she was converted to a Marconi-ketch.

Over the years Doris has gone under a number of names. Under Lawrence Reeve, she was referred to as Astarte from 1934. She was renamed Huntress in 1937 under new owners and became Vayu when purchased by Richard Hart in 1940. James Mercanti purchased Vayu from Frederic B. Smith of Winthrop, Massachusetts. The ship remained as Vayu under the next owner, Jim Mercanti, who had the boat between 1957 and 1975, before coming into the possession of David Revenaugh. Under Brian Amble, who owned the boat from 2001 until at least 2007, she was known once more by her original name, Doris.

At its NRHP listing in 1984, the yacht was located in the Connecticut River off River Rd., Deep River, Connecticut, but it was expected to be moved for an upcoming restoration. Latest information is that the ship is owned by Crocker's Boatyard in New London, Connecticut. According to the Herreshoff Registry, the ship "is currently in poor condition and is in imminent danger of being cut up."

Original construction drawings for much of the ship are preserved in the collection at the Hart Nautical Museum, at the Massachusetts Institute of Technology.

She is currently under restoration by David Snediker at Snediker Yacht Restoration.

== See also ==
- National Register of Historic Places listings in Middlesex County, Connecticut
