= Fighting Forties =

The Fighting Forties can refer to:

- the 1940s when Britain, the United States, and their allies took on the Axis powers in Europe and the Far East.
- the famous Nathanael Herreshoff New York Yacht Club 40's. A line of yachts, named such due to their competitive prowess.
