= Herreshoff Prudence =

Sailboat class

Development
- Designer: L. Francis Herreshoff
- Location: United States
- Year: 1937
- Builder: Middleton Marine
- Role: Cruiser

Boat
- Displacement: 7,000 lb (3,175 kg)
- Draft: 3.00 ft (0.91 m)

Hull
- Type: monohull
- Construction: wood or fiberglass
- LOA: 22.75 ft (6.93 m)
- LWL: 19.75 ft (6.02 m)
- Beam: 8.00 ft (2.44 m)
- Engine: Yanmar 1GM diesel engine

Hull appendages
- Keel: long keel
- Ballast: 3,500 lb (1,588 kg)
- Rudder: keel-mounted rudder

Rig
- Rig type: Bermuda rig

Sails
- Sailplan: masthead sloop
- Total sail area: 315 sq ft (29.3 m^{2})

The Herreshoff Prudence, also called the Herreshoff Prudence 23, is an American trailerable sailboat that was designed by L. Francis Herreshoff as a cruiser and first built in 1937. It was L. Francis Herreshoff's design number 71 and named for Prudence Island.

== Production ==
Plans were published in The Rudder magazine in about 1938 and the design has been built by a number of companies since then. The last known builder was Middleton Marine in La Crosse, Florida, United States. That company started production in the 1980s and was still building boats in the early 21st century, but is now inactive and the boat is now out of production. When it was in production, Middleton Marine supplied the boat on a custom basis as a kit at various different levels of completion, or as a ready-to-sail boat.

== Design ==
The Herreshoff Prudence is a recreational keelboat, initially built predominantly of wood and later of fiberglass, with wooden trim. It has a masthead sloop rig, a spooned raked stem, an angled transom, a keel-mounted rudder controlled by a tiller and a fixed long keel. It displaces 7,000 lb (3,175 kg) and carries 3,500 lb (1,588 kg) of ballast.

The boat has a draft of 3.00 ft (0.91 m) with the standard long keel.

The boat is fitted with a Japanese Yanmar 1GMF diesel engine for docking and maneuvering. The fuel tank holds 12 U.S. gallons (45 L; 10.0 imp gal) and the fresh water tank has a capacity of 20 U.S. gallons (76 L; 17 imp gal).

The design has sleeping accommodation for two people, on two straight settee berths in the main cabin. The galley is located on both sides amidships. The galley is equipped with a two-burner stove, an icebox and a sink. The head is located centered in the forepeak. Cabin headroom is 57 in (145 cm).

The design has a hull speed of 6.0 kn (11.1 km/h).

== Operational history ==
In a 2010 review Steve Henkel wrote, "best features: The traditionalist will enjoy the design, originated in 1937 ... As with any of her comp[etitor]s, the Prudence will satisfy the cruiser's need to explore distant places in relative comfort regardless of weather (short of a gale). Worst features: The headroom falls short of her comp[etitor]s by 14" or more—but if the galley were moved aft under the companionway, a dodger could be installed to provide reasonable standing headroom at the galley while preparing meals."

== See also ==
- List of sailing boat types
