= Herreshoff Castle =

Private residence in Massachusetts, U.S.

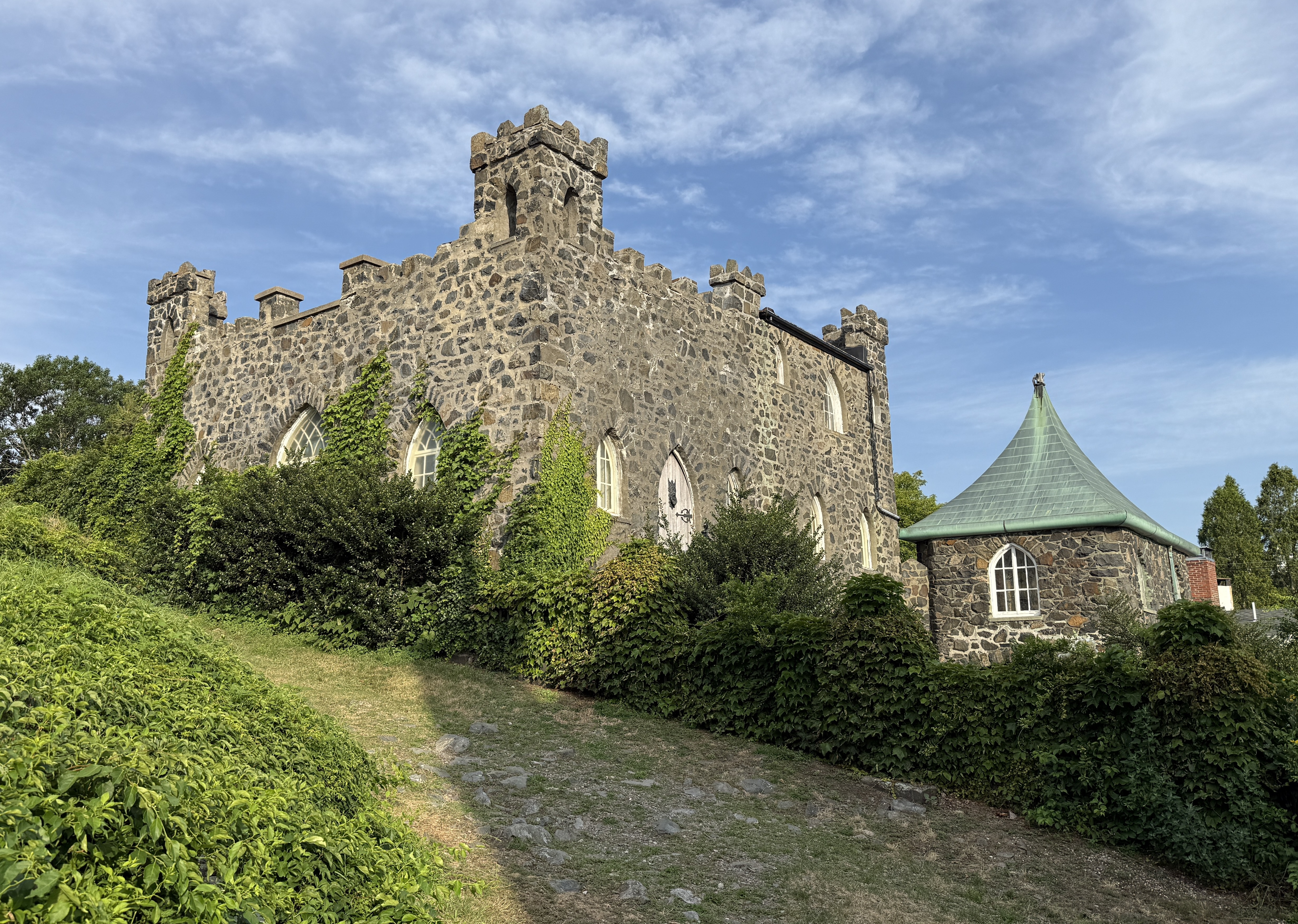
- Herreshoff Castle
- Interactive map of the Herreshoff Castle area

General information
- Type: Residential
- Architectural style: 10th century gothic
- Location: 2 Crocker Park; Marblehead, Massachusetts
- Coordinates: 42.503513°N 70.848825°W
- Completed: June 1927

Height
- Height: 32 feet (9.8 m)

Technical details
- Material: Stone blasted from the ledge upon which it stands
- Size: 42 by 38 feet (13 m × 12 m)

Design and construction
- Architects: Waldo Peter Ballard and wife, Joan Ballard, original occupants
- Main contractor: John Dilworth Regan, mason and general contractor; Dwight Lyman Fulton, carpenter

Herreshoff Castle, formerly known as Castle Brattahlid, is an unusual gothic style residence located at 2 Crocker Park, Marblehead, Massachusetts. The original owner intended the design be based on Erik the Red's castle at Brattahlíð in Greenland. The house was built entirely out of the stone blasted from the site it was built.

== History ==
=== Description in 1927 ===
The main building features on the ground floor a cook room, eating room, and pantry. The main room is above it, on the second floor, 34 by 26 feet (10.4 m × 7.9 m), with a massive fireplace and entrance from Crocker Park, named after Uriel Crocker (1796–1887), who donated a large portion of the land. The park was originally known as Bartoll's Head. Stairs of oaken planks bolted onto a chain lead to another room of an entirely different period of architecture, 34 by 16 feet (10.4 m × 4.9 m), with a high domed ceiling – also with a large fireplace, slightly smaller than the one in the main room.

The so-called Tower Building is two stories. The lower floor is for social purposes, the upper for a painting studio. The ceiling of the upper is open to the apex of the copper roof, with oak beams exposed. The ceiling is 21 feet (6.4 m) high. Within the walls is a secret stairway. There is also a small dungeon.

A stone stairway on the exterior leads to the main room. The windows are Gothic, small, but provide ample light. The doors are of solid oak planks, bolted together with half-inch steel rods.

==== View ====
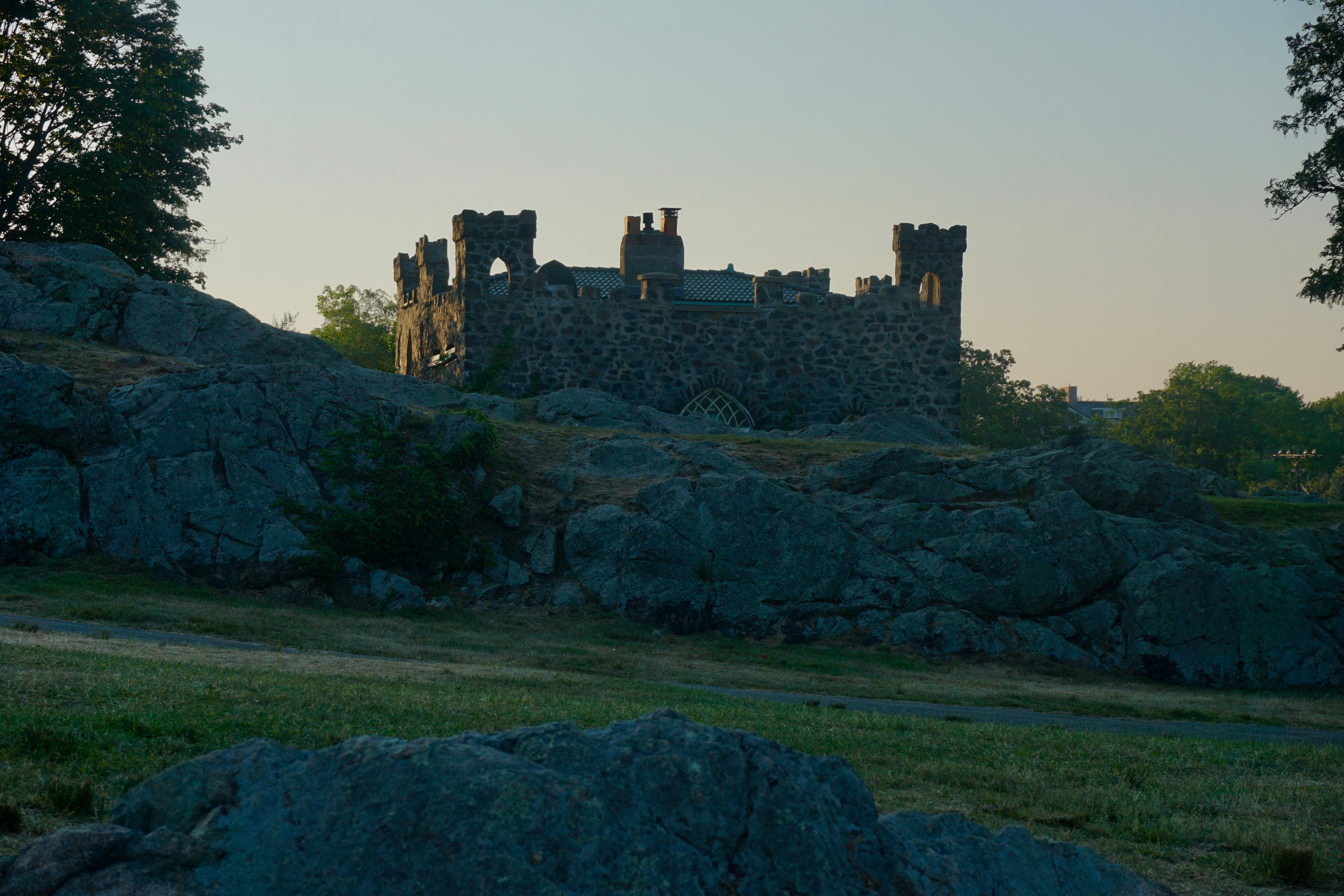
Herreshoff Castle set above the rocks ledges of Crocker Park

From the flat roof, the panoramic view extends from Boston Light on the south, to the Magnolia shore on the north, overlooking Marblehead Neck and the entire harbor.

== Provenance ==
=== Ballard ===
The castle was completed June 1927 by Marblehead artist Waldo Ballard (né Waldo Peter Ballard; 1873–1958) and his wife, Joan Ballard (née Joanna McCoy; 1873–1958), who stated that they based their design on Erik the Red's castle at Brattahlíð in Greenland, although the structure is Gothic in nature and does not resemble buildings of the type that would have been constructed at Brattahlíð during the era of Erik the Red. It is said that Ballard painted an oriental rug design on the castle's great room floor, based on an actual carpet in the nearby Jeremiah Lee Mansion.

=== Herreshoff ===
In 1945 the Ballards sold the castle to L. Francis Herreshoff (1890–1972), son of noted yacht designer Nathanael Greene Herreshoff (1848–1938) and acclaimed yacht designer in his own right. Herreshoff, in 1926, had gone into business for himself as a yacht designer in Marblehead.

=== Vaughn ===
After Herreshoff's death, Muriel M. Vaughn (née Muriel Elizabeth Miller; 1915–1990) occupied the castle. Muriel had been Herreshoff's secretary. According to her biography by the Mystic Seaport Museum, L. Francis Herreshoff had designated Vaughn as executrix and sole beneficiary of his estate. Vaughn moved into the Castle and continued to operate his yacht design business. She collected his writings into two books, Sensible Cruising Designs (1973) and An L. Francis Herreshoff Reader (1978).

Vaughn was the widow of Robert Lincoln Vaughn (1908–1958), who from 1951 to 1953 had been an executive officer at the Central Torpedo Office in Newport, Rhode Island. He was a graduate of Phillips Exeter (1927), Harvard College (1931), and Harvard Business School (1933). He died in 1958 from complications following an appendectomy. The Central Torpedo Office was an outgrowth of the Naval Torpedo Station, founded in 1869 on Goat Island. Muriel Vaughn, in 1936, was one of 6 women in a class of 67 graduates of the Massachusetts College of Pharmacy.

After Muriel died, Elizabeth Vaughn (born 1946), her daughter, inherited the estate, sold the Herreshoff Castle, but carried on some unfinished curation of Herreshoff's work.

=== Rubino ===
Michael Horton Rubino, EdD, JD, and his wife, Christina (née Pranker), acquired the Herreshoff Castle in 1990. Rubino was born in Marblehead.

== See also ==
- Herreshoff family

== Bibliography ==
=== References ===
- Boston Globe, The (June 10, 1936). "67 Graduated as Pharmacists – Diplomas Conferred by Pres W. H. Glover". Vol. 129, no. 162 (main ed.). p. 36 – via Newspapers.com.
- Boston Globe, The (June 11, 1936). "Massachusetts College of Pharmacy Give Degrees to 6 Women, 61 Men" (photo included). Vol. 129, no. 163 (main ed.). p. 2 – via Newspapers.com.
- Boston Sunday Globe, The (March 9, 1958). "Waldo P. Ballard" (obituary). Vol. 173, no. 68. p. 50 (column 1) – via Newspapers.com.
- Boston Globe, The (December 4, 1972). "L. Francis Herreshoff, Sailing Yacht Designer". Obituaries. Vol. 202, no. 157 (main ed.). p. 35 – via Newspapers.com.
- Boston Sunday Globe, The; Albanese, Ellen (August 3, 2008). "A Castle in Marblehead Truly Fit for a Viking". Travel Section (main ed.). p. M8.
- "The Herreshoff Castle Bed & Breakfast". The Herreshoff Castle. Archived from the original on January 7, 2016.
- "Manuscripts Collection 339". Muriel Vaughn and L. Francis Herreshoff Collection. Mystic Seaport Museum. May 20, 2016.
- Marblehead Home and Style Magazine of The Salem News (Summer 2010). "Marblehead: Michael Rubino the owner of the Herreshoff Castle Bed and Breakfast ... ". photo frames 55, 57, 58, 59, 61 – via photos by Mark Teiwes of The Salem News.
- Marblehead Messenger, The (June 10, 1927). "The Brattahlid Truly Is 'Hewn Out of Rock'". Vol. 56, no. 23. Marblehead, Massachusetts. pp. 1 & 4. LCCN sn83020276. OCLC 9314716 – via Abbot Public Library, Marblehead, Massachusetts.
- Newport Daily News (April 24, 1958). "Cmdr. R.L. Vaughn, Had Duty Here" (obituary). Vol. 114, no. 166. p. 2 (column 5) – via Newspapers.com.
