= Helianthus III =

- HELIANTHUS III (yacht)
- U.S. National Register of Historic Places
- Location within Maryland Location within the United States
- Location: Hilton Inn dock, Annapolis, Maryland
- Built: 1920
- Architect: Herreshoff, Nathaniel Greene
- Architectural style: Yacht
- NRHP reference No.: 84001343
- Added to NRHP: August 09, 1984

The Helianthus III was a yacht, built by Nathanael Greene Herreshoff (1848–1938) in 1924. She was a ketch-rigged wooden vessel, 62½' long on deck with a 13'-9" beam and 4'-6" draft. Before being lost at sea in the 1990s, she was docked at Annapolis, Anne Arundel County, Maryland.

She was listed on the National Register of Historic Places in 1984.
