= James Brown Herreshoff =

Chemist and inventor

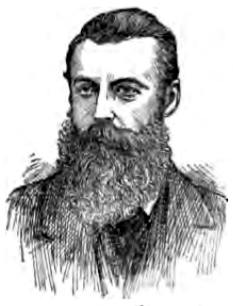
- Born: March 18, 1834; Bristol, Rhode Island
- Died: December 5, 1930 (aged 96); Riverdale, New York
- Education: Brown University
- Occupations: Inventor, chemist

James Brown F. Herreshoff (1834–1930) was an American inventor and chemist with a number of American patents related to chemicals and filed in the 1900s and 1910s: a coil-stream boiler, keels used on racing yachts, sliding seats on rowboats, mercurial anti-fouling paint, and an apparatus for measuring heat of gases.

== Biography ==
James Brown Herreshoff was born in Bristol, Rhode Island on March 18, 1834, into a notable American family of chemists, boat designers and inventors. He was the first-born son of Charles Frederick Herreshoff III, and brother to John Brown Francis Herreshoff. He graduated from Brown University.

He did work for the Nichols Copper Company where his brother was vice-president.

He died in Riverdale, New York on December 5, 1930.

=== Patents ===
- U.S. patent 1103925A
- U.S. patent 1231349A
- U.S. patent 1262045A

== Family ==
Herreshoff was the father of Charles Frederick Herreshoff (1876–1954), yacht designer, automotive designer, and automotive manufacturer. By way of his mother, Julia Ann Lewis (maiden; 1811–1901), he was a grand nephew of Captain Winslow Lewis (1770–1850), sea captain, engineer, inventor, and contractor active in the construction of many American lighthouses during the first half of the nineteenth century.
