= Fred Herreshoff =

Amateur golfer (1888–1920)

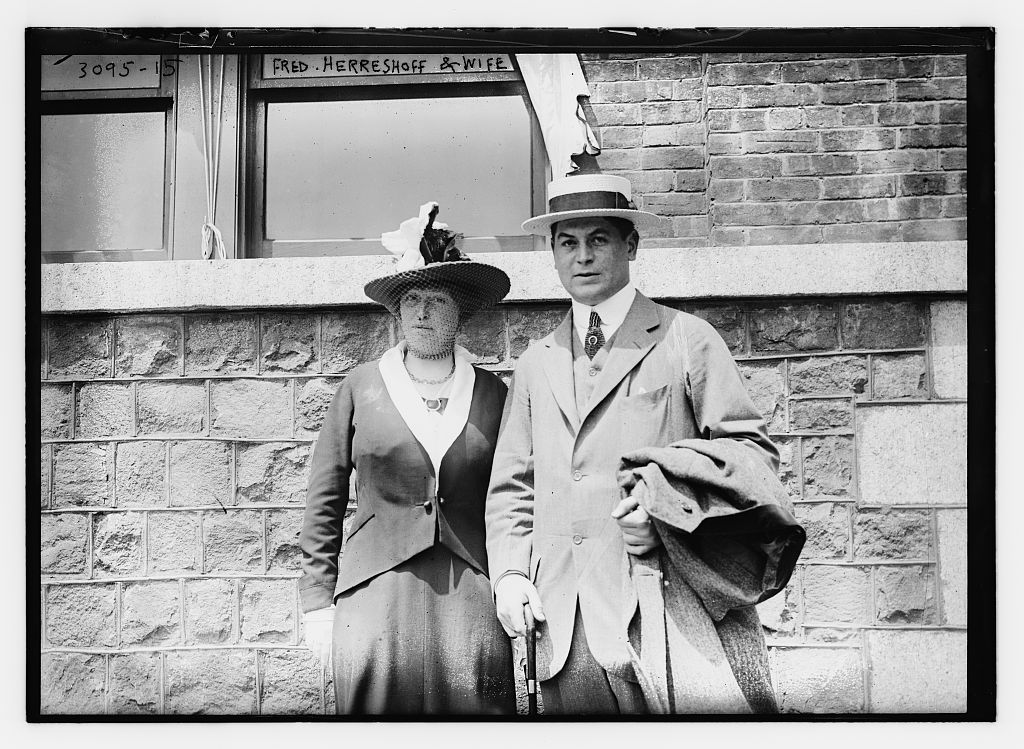
- Herreshoff and his wife Mary (c. 1914)

Personal information
- Nationality: United States
- Born: March 7, 1888 Brooklyn, New York, United States
- Died: March 23, 1920 (aged 32) Manhattan, New York, United States
- Spouse: Mary Faulkner

Career
- Sport: Golf
- Status: Amateur

Best results in major championships
- Masters Tournament: DNP
- PGA Championship: DNP
- U.S. Open: T16: 1913
- The Open Championship: DNP
- U.S. Amateur: 2nd: 1904, 1911
- British Amateur: R64: 1914

Frederick Herreshoff (March 7, 1888 – March 23, 1920) was an American amateur golfer of the early 20th century. He was a golfing prodigy: at the age of just 16 he reached the final match of the 1904 U.S. Amateur, finishing runner-up to Chandler Egan by the score of 8 and 6.

== Early life ==
Herreshoff was born on March 7, 1888, to John B. F. Herreshoff and Emaline Duval Lee in Brooklyn, New York. In 1904, he played on the high school golf team at The Hill School in Pottstown, Pennsylvania. He attended Yale University graduating in 1909.

His father was a metallurgical chemist affiliated with Herreshoff Manufacturing Company of Bristol, Rhode Island, which specialized in the construction of high speed torpedo boats and yachts. The elder Herreshoff was also the president of The General Chemical Company.

== Golf career ==
Herreshoff, who in 1904 was playing out of Ekwanok Country Club in Manchester, Vermont, finished runner-up in the 1904 U.S. Amateur, held at Baltusrol Golf Club, Far Hills, New Jersey, losing to Chandler Egan by the score of 8 and 6. He got himself into trouble by falling nine holes down after the first 18 holes of play. Herreshoff played better in the second round but it wasn't enough to overcome the large deficit.

Herreshoff, who partnered with George Low in a four-ball tournament held on 16 September 1905 at Fox Hills Golf Club on Staten Island, tied for first place with Alex Smith and C. A. Dunning with a score of 71. A playoff wasn't held due to the fact that Smith was also competing in the individual medal competition which he won from Willie Anderson.

In 1909, shortly after he graduated from Yale, Herreshoff was engaged as a partner in the banking and brokerage firm of Frenaye & Herreshoff with an office in New York City.

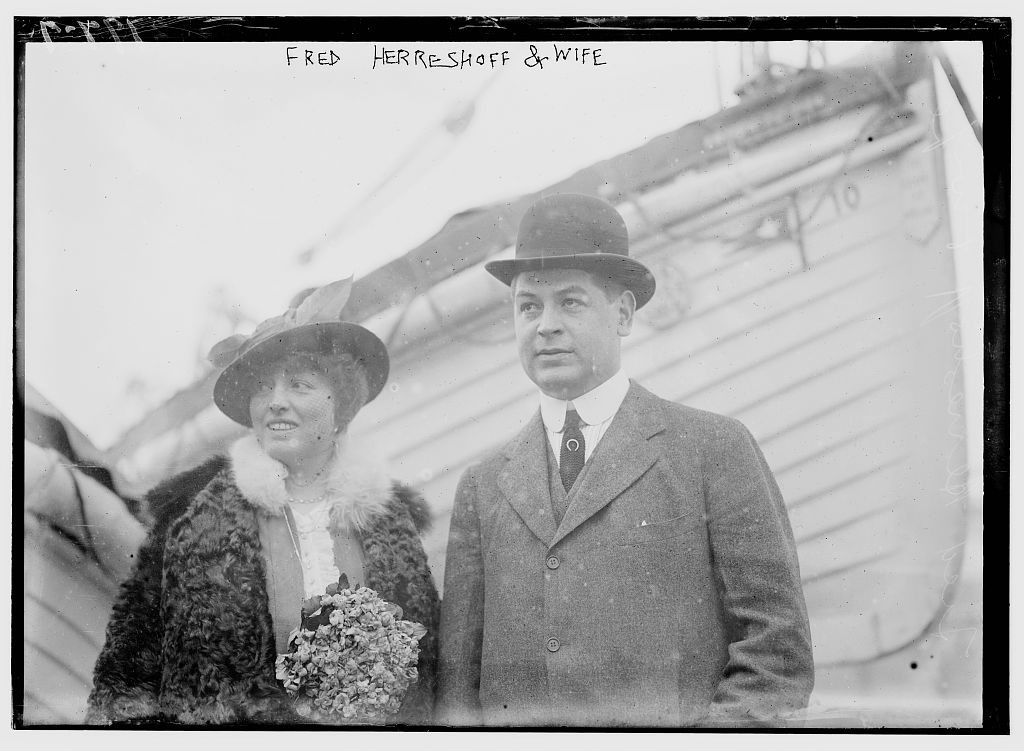
Herreshoff and his wife (c. 1919)

In the 1911 U.S. Amateur—contested at the Apawamis Club in Rye, New York—Herreshoff had won several matches, including the semi-final against Chick Evans. In the final match against Harold Hilton he was at one point trailing by six holes but managed to mount a stunning comeback to tie the match and send it to a playoff. On the 37th hole of the match, Hilton sliced his approach shot badly but instead of finding the deep rough right of the green his ball ricocheted off a flat rock and luckily landed on the green.

Herreshoff, meanwhile, mishit his approach shot to a position short of the green. His pitch shot to the par 4 hole went 20 feet past the pin. Hilton two-putted for par while Herreshoff was unable to make his 20-foot putt to save par. Hilton was declared the winner by the score of 1 up.

Herreshoff served in the U.S. Army during World War I in France. He received an honorable discharge on June 2, 1919.

== Personal life ==
In 1909, Herreshoff married Mary Faulkner, an actress, when she was playing in a musical comedy at the Casino Theatre in New York City. At that time the Edwardian musical Havana was playing. Mary's name does not appear in the official credits so she must have had an uncredited bit part.

Herreshoff died suddenly of pneumonia on March 23, 1920, in Manhattan, New York. Interment was in Laurel Hill Cemetery, Philadelphia, Pennsylvania.

== Results in major championships ==
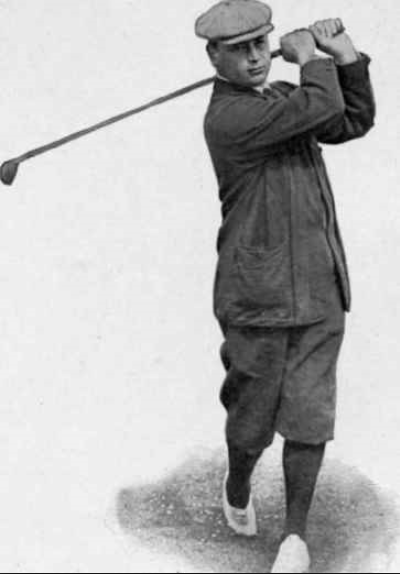
Herreshoff in his swing follow through, c. 1915

Tournament	1904	1905	1906	1907	1908	1909	1910	1911	1912	1913	1914	1915	1916
U.S. Open				CUT		WD	20LA			T16			
U.S. Amateur	2	QF	R32	R16	SF	R32	QF M	2		SF	R32		DNQ
The Amateur Championship									R128		R64	NT	NT

Top 10
Did not play

M = Medalist
LA = Low amateur
NT = no tournament
WD = withdrew
"T" indicates a tie for a place
DNQ = did not qualify for match play portion
R128, R64, R32, R16, QF, SF = round in which player lost in match play

Sources: U.S. Open and U.S. Amateur, British Amateur (1912 and 1914)
