= Herreshoff (automobile) =

Defunct American motor vehicle manufacturer

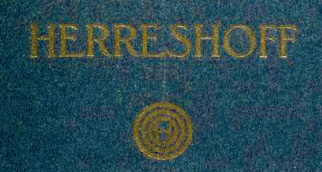
Herreshoff

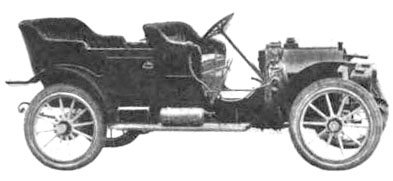
1910 Herreshoff Touring Car

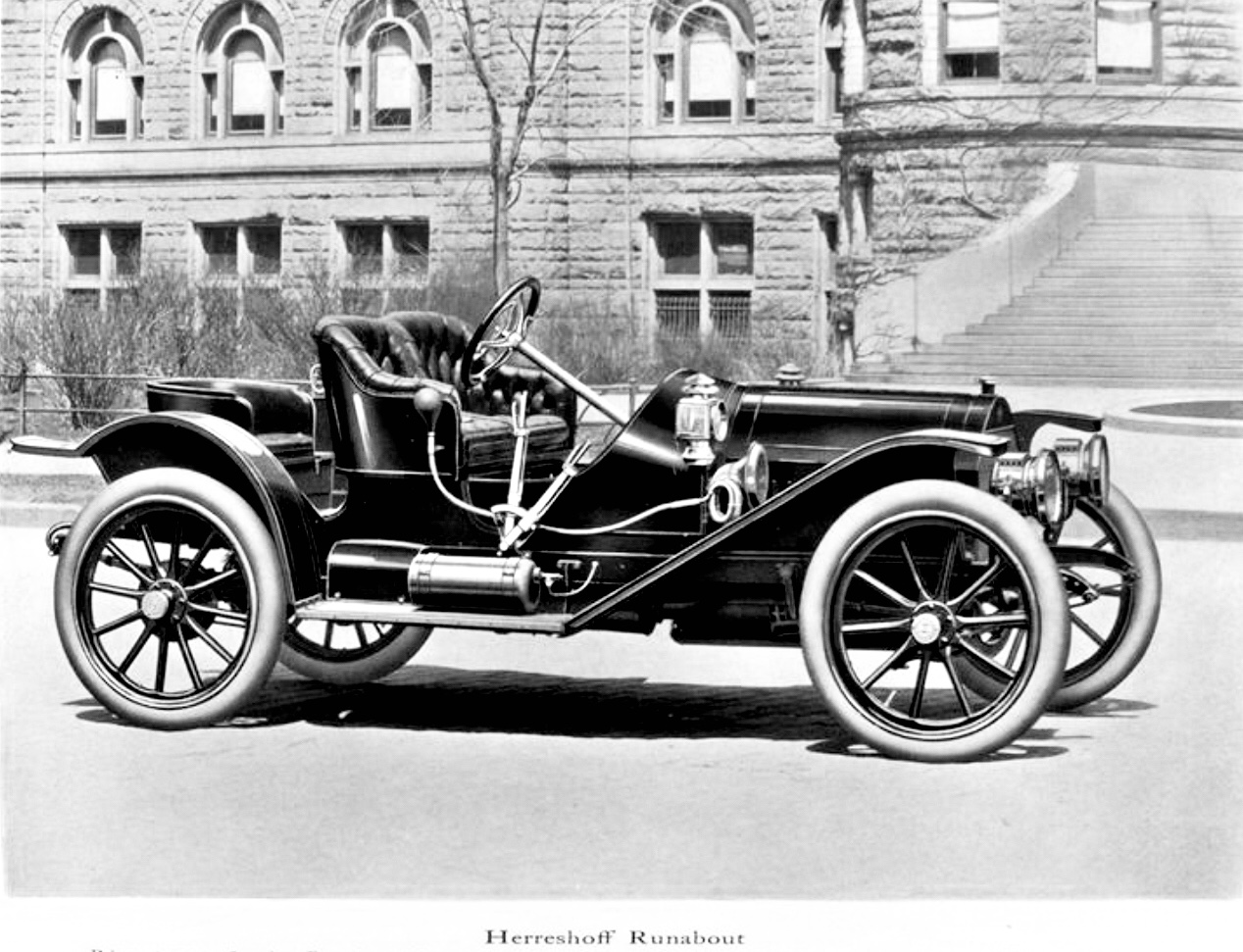
Herreshoff 20-A Runabout (1909-1910) 24 HP

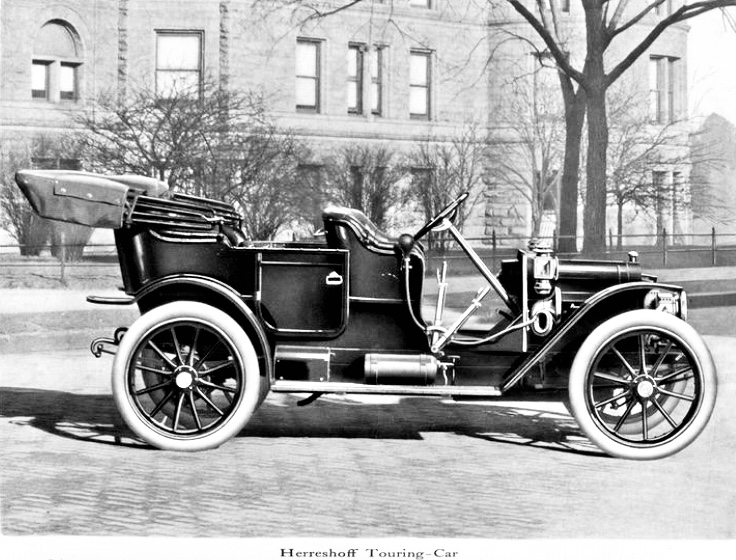
Herreshoff 20-A Touring Car (1909-1910) 24 HP

The Herreshoff was an American automobile built in both Detroit, Michigan, and Troy, New York, by the Herreshoff Motor Company from 1909 to 1914. The Herreshoff started as a small car with a 24 hp (18 kW) four-cylinder engine, and was made with three different models. Later models were upgraded to six-cylinder engines up to 3.8 liter capacity. For 1911, Herreshoff had a roadster with a rudimentary rumble seat at US$950 (equivalent to $32,059 in 2024); by contrast, the high-volume Oldsmobile Runabout went for $650 (equivalent to $21,935 in 2024). In 1909, 500 vehicles were produced by Herreshoff.

A light car with a 16 hp (12 kW) engine was introduced in 1914. Fisher produced bodies for the company.

The Herreshoff Motor Company was founded by Charles F. Herreshoff. In addition to the aforementioned roadster (the Model 25), in 1911 the company offered a touring car, tourabout and runabout, each $1500 (equivalent to $50,620 in 2024).
