= L. Francis Herreshoff =

Lewis Francis Herreshoff
- Born: November 11, 1890; Bristol, Rhode Island
- Died: December 1, 1972 (aged 82)
- Occupation: Ship Designer
- Father: Nathanael Greene Herreshoff

L. (Lewis) Francis Herreshoff (November 11, 1890 – December 1972), was an American boat designer, naval architect, editor, and author of books and magazine articles.

== Biography ==
Herreshoff was born on November 11, 1890, in Bristol, Rhode Island, to Clara Anna DeWolf (1853–1905) and Nathanael Greene Herreshoff (1848–1938). In 1926, after naval service and work for Starling Burgess, he went into business for himself in Marblehead, Massachusetts, as a designer of racing and pleasure yachts, canoes, kayaks and other small craft. Herreshoff died December 1972.

Herreshoff was inducted into the National Sailing Hall of Fame in 2014.

== Notable designs ==
Herreshoff's designs included:

- A series of graceful clipper-bowed ketches: Ticonderoga 72 ft, Tioga/Bounty 57 ft, Mobjack 45 Ft and Nereia 36
- A shoal-draft leeboarder: Meadowlark
- Arguably the original "passagemaker"; the inspiration for Beebe's book, and an indirect inspiration for Perry's "container boat": Marco Polo.
- His answer to Hanna's ideas about the ideal homebuilt boat: H-28
- The 73-foot (22 m) Merlin, sunk on July 7, 1999, by a humpback whale in Whale Bay, Baranof Island, Alaska.
- Buzzards Bay 14
- Herreshoff Prudence
- Herreshoff Rozinante
- Stuart Knockabout

== Publications ==
His books include The Common Sense of Yacht Design, The Compleat Cruiser, Capt. Nat Herreshoff: The Wizard of Bristol, The Writings of L. Francis Herreshoff, Sensible Cruising Designs and An L. Francis Herreshoff Reader.

== See also ==
- Herreshoff Castle
- Herreshoff family
- Herreshoff anchor
