= Louise Herreshoff =

American painter and ceramics collector (1876–1967)

Louise Herreshoff Reeves
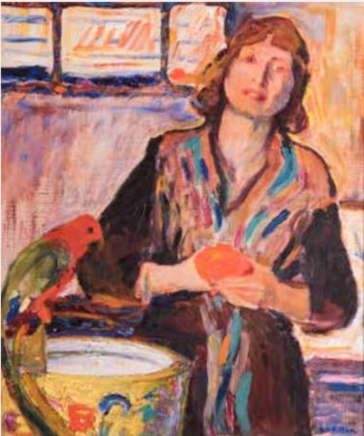
- Parrot (Self-Portrait), c. 1920
- Born: November 29, 1876; Brooklyn, New York, U.S.
- Died: May 14, 1967 (aged 90)
- Resting place: Mount Auburn Cemetery
- Other name: Louise Eaton
- Education: Académie Julian
- Known for: Painting, ceramics collector
- Movement: Fauvism

Louise Chamberlain Herreshoff (November 29, 1876 – May 14, 1967) was an American painter and collector of porcelain. She lived for most of her life in either New York or Rhode Island, although she undertook extended art training in France at the Académie Julian. With her second husband, she collected a "little museum" of porcelain in two Providence houses. She stopped painting when her aunt, Elizabeth Dyer (maiden; 1841–1927), who had been a foster mother to her, died. Her painting style has been described as Impressionist and Fauvist.

== Biography ==
=== Early life ===
Herreshoff was born in Brooklyn to the marriage of John Brown Francis Herreshoff (1850–1932) and Grace Eugenia Dyer (maiden; 1851–1880). Her ancestors and relatives on the Herreshoff side of the family were – and still are – notable naval architects and industrial chemists from Bristol, Rhode Island. When she was 4 years, 1 week, and 5 days old, her mother died. She was subsequently taken in by her aunts in Providence. Her father – on October 25, 1882, in Philadelphia – remarried Emaline Duval ("Mildred") Lee (maiden; 1863–1930). At the age of six, she began art classes at Mary C. Wheeler's studio, while attending the Lincoln School. She graduated from Lincoln in 1890. One of her nephews, Guido Borgianni (1914–2011) – a son of her half sister, Sarah Lothrop Herreshoff (maiden; 1889–1958) – was an American-born Italian painter.

Wheeler was famous for taking her students to Europe for summer study, and on one of these visits in 1895, Herreshoff met Raphaël Collin at Fontenay-aux-Roses. He would become her teacher for the next two summers. In 1898, she moved permanently to Paris to study with Collin. While she was there, she took sketching and painting visits elsewhere around the continent. In 1899, she enrolled for classical art education at the Académie Julian, where she was taught by Jean-Paul Laurens, whose Impressionistic use of color had a strong influence on her own style, and by Benjamin Constant.

=== Artistic career ===
Herreshoff exhibited in the Paris Salon in 1897, and her 1899 painting Le Repos was accepted into the 1900 Paris Salon. That same year An Interior was shown at the National Academy of Design. Herreshoff's early painting style was academic and traditional, but under the influence of Fauvism, she slowly turned to the vivid, bright use of color in her paintings. Her early works were compared to the style of John Singer Sargent and William Merritt Chase. During the course of her studies, Herreshoff would often return to the United States and summer in Sugar Hill, New Hampshire, or Cape Ann, Massachusetts, a location that would often appear in her landscapes.

In 1903, Herreshoff returned to the United States, to live in Brooklyn, although she also showed paintings at the Rhode Island School of Design that year. She had expected to marry James Herreshoff, her cousin, but was discouraged by her family. She maintained a studio in Brooklyn, and until 1910, she split her time between Providence and New York, summering along the New England coast. It was probably during this period of her life that she began to work in watercolor, in addition to oil painting.

In December 1910, Herreshoff married her distant cousin, Charles Eaton, an employee of General Electric, in Providence and then moved to Schenectady, New York with him. After only three months, they separated (they did not divorce, however, until 1920). She returned to Providence to live with her aunt, Elizabeth Dyer, whom she considered a surrogate mother. Between 1921 and 1925, she continued exhibiting and showed artworks at the Pennsylvania Academy of the Fine Arts, the Philadelphia Watercolor Club, the North Shore Art Association in Gloucester, Massachusetts, The Gallery on the Moors, and the Providence Art Club. In October 1926, American Magazine of Art picked out Herreshoff's portrait of her aunt My Aunt Elizabeth.

=== Ceramic collector ===
Herreshoff's aunt, however, died in 1927. This event apparently caused her to cease painting: she resigned from the Providence Art Club in December 1928. She packed her paintings away in the attic of her Providence home and spent the next forty years collecting porcelain. (Some of the last paintings, Herreshoff completed had been a portrait series of her aunt. One of them on display in 1926 was described as "a forceful bit of painting—fine in character.") Afterwards, her collecting began in earnest, after she inherited from her father in 1932. At sixty-six, in 1941, she married the thirty-eight-year-old Euchlin D. Reeves, a graduate of Washington and Lee University School of Law whom she had met at a ceramic collectors' club. The pairing, which at least one writer has suggested was based on a shared love of collecting rather than any romantic attachment, was described as "a fragile union", although they did remain married for over twenty-five years.

The couple's shared love of acquisition was so great that they eventually filled an entire house with furniture and porcelain, and purchased another next door, the Bannister House, into which they could expand. This house, too, was eventually filled. As the Washington and Lee treasurer James Whitehead described it: "The highly personal collection that began as an orderly display of antiques for [the Reeves'] pleasure and viewing by friends and other collectors slowly became unmanageable." The reason the collection expanded so much was that "should they see one item in a large lot, they would buy the entire assortment. In doing so, they would keep all the unimportant pieces—inexpensive plates, cups and saucers given as premiums at local movie theatres on Saturday nights and dishes given with the purchase of gasoline added to their eclectic accumulation."

The two remained married until Euchlin's death in January 1967. Herreshoff's own death followed later that year. Herreshoff and Reeves are buried at Mount Auburn Cemetery in Massachusetts.

== Artistic style ==
Herreshoff's early oil paintings reflected her academic training, although she adopted a more Impressionistic style over time. In the 1910s, she took up watercolors and began to paint Tonalist landscapes, often of seaside towns or barren landscapes.

Her works from the 1920s on exhibited the vibrant, unnaturalistic color associated with Fauvism. Her increased use of color contrasted with the earlier delicate or realistic works she painted.

== Legacy ==
Herreshoff bequeathed her collection, now numbering over 2,000 pieces of Chinese export porcelain as well as British and Continental European examples, to Washington and Lee University. The Reeves Collection has since grown to encompass work from Asia, Europe, and the Americas, and today contains over four thousand objects.

The movers who came to take the porcelain were surprised by the paintings, and only saved them for use of the frames. After Herreshoff's artworks were brought to the university, treasurer James W. Whitehead and art professor Marion Junkin cleaned the glass on the paintings and were surprised by the talent they displayed. They contacted art historian William H. Gerdts, who confirmed the works' merit.

As a result, Whitehead coordinated an exhibition of Herreshoff's paintings co-sponsored by the university and the Corcoran Gallery of Art in 1976. One of her pieces, Poppies of c. 1920, was included in the inaugural exhibition of the National Museum of Women in the Arts, American Women Artists 1830–1930, in 1987. The story of Herreshoff and Reeves is the subject of the book A Fragile Union: The Story of Louise Herreshoff – by James Walter Whitehead (1921–2015), the curator who helped to bring their art collection to Washington and Lee. The foreword was written by Tom Wolfe, who has also discussed her paintings. A 2020 digital exhibition was held by Washington and Lee's Staniar Gallery, To See Color First, to display Herreshoff's work.

== Bibliography ==
=== Inline references ===
- American Magazine of Art (The). LCCN sn92-25917; ISSN 2151-254X, ISSN 2329-3209; OCLC 3876952 (all editions).
1. "Notes" – "The North Shore Arts Association's Fourth Annual Exhibition [Gloucester]". Vol. 17, no. 10. October 1926. p. 549.
  1. Via JSTOR. JSTOR 23929163.
  2. Via Internet Archive.
- askART. "Artist Biography and Facts: Louise Herreshoff". Scottsdale, Arizona. OCLC 931825410.
- Baschet, Ludovic [in French] (ed.). Catalogue Illustré. Paris: Ludovic Baschet. Société des Artistes Français. LCCN sn81-3493, LCCN ca05-816, LCCN sf85-9525; OCLC 12592313 (all editions).
1. Vol. 22: Salon de 1900. "Peinture". 659: "Herreshoff (M^{lle} L.C.)" – via Internet Archive (Getty Research Institute).
- Bernabo, Tracy; Hobbs, Patricia (2020). To See Color First: Louise Herreshoff Eaton. Lexington, Virginia: Washington and Lee University – via ISSUU. ISBN 978-0-5786-6216-9.
- Boston Globe (The); Philpott, Anthony J. (1862–1952) (July 21, 1926). "Cape Anne Art Exhibition Rivals Those Held in Winter Months". Vol. 110, no. 21. p. 5 (columns 1–3; middle).
1. Via Newspapers.com.
2. Via ProQuest 498790955 (Historical Newspapers database); LCCN 2010-263454.
- Earls, Amy C. (2005). "James W. Whitehead | A Fragile Union: The Story of Louise Herreshoff". Ceramics in America (review). Milwaukee: Chipstone Foundation. ISSN 1533-7154; OCLC 45859165 (all editions).
- Fuchs, Ronald William II (2017). 50 Treasures: Celebrating the 50th Anniversary of the Reeves Collection of Ceramics at Washington and Lee University. Lexington, Virginia: Washington and Lee University. pp. 5–6, 31, 50. ISBN 978-0-6929-2794-6, 0-6929-2794-8; OCLC 1037949569 (all editions).
1. Via ISSUU.
- Hart, Joan (20 March 2013). "Women in Art This Week – Louise Herreshoff, The Lost Artist". Arts Everyday Living (blog). Art Happenings. Archived from the original on September 28, 2020.
- Incollect Magazine; Fuchs, Ronald William II (January 28, 2014). "The Reeves Collection of Ceramics at Washington and Lee University". Archived from the original on January 16, 2017. ISSN 2162-4607; OCLC 1313806230 (all editions).
- Reeves, Louise Chamberlain Herreshoff (1976). Louise Herreshoff: An American Artist Discovered: An Exhibition, October 9 – November 21, 1976 (exhibition catalog). Introduction by Robert Edward Royall Huntley. Foreword by Roy Slade. Commentary by Norman Hirschl (1915–2002). James W. Whitehead. Lexington, Virginia: Washington and Lee University. LCCN 76-150460; OCLC 2646529 (all editions).
1. Via Internet Archive.
2. Via Google Books (snippet view only).
- Satchell, Stephen Ellwood [at Wikidata], ed. (7 July 2009). Collectible Investments for the High Net Worth Investor (1st ed.). Academic Press. LCCN 2009-280725; doi:10.1016/B978-0-12-374522-4.X0001-7; ISBN 978-0-1237-4522-4, 0-1237-4522-5, ISBN 978-0-0809-2305-5, 0-0809-2305-4, OCLC 297145992 (all editions).
1. Mueller, Shirley Maloney. Part 2: "The Neuropsychology of the Collector" (limited preview). pp. 31–51 – via Google Books. doi:10.1016/B978-0-12-374522-4.00002-0; OCLC 4934445794.
- Sunday News; Keefe, Robert S. (October 10, 1976). "Louise Herreshoff: An American Artist Discovered". Vol. 54, no. 4 (Metropolitan ed.). Lancaster, Pennsylvania. p. 14 (section A; digital image no. 84). LCCN sn87-80024; OCLC 11379967 (all editions).
1. Via Newspapers.com.
- Tufts, Eleanor (1987). American Women Artists, 1830–1930. International Exhibitions Foundation for the National Museum of Women in the Arts. pp. 97–98. LCCN 86-83190; ISBN 978-0-9409-7901-7, 0-9409-7901-2; OCLC 15815023 (all editions).
1. Via Google Books (snippet view).
- Whipple Database (genealogy blog) (db.whipple.org).
1. "Louise Chamberlin Herreshoff b. 29 Nov 1876 Brooklyn, Kings, New York d. 14 May 1967 Providence, Providence, Rhode Island".
2. "Euchlin Dalcho Reeves, Jr. b. 1903 Orangeburg, Orangeburg, South Carolina d. 1967".
- Wolfe, Tom (1930–1918) (9 June 2011). "Tom Wolfe Speaks About [James W. Whitehead's 2003 book]: A Fragile Union: The Story of Louise Herreshoff" – via YouTube (video).

=== General references ===
- Gerdts, William Henry, Jr. (1990). Art Across America: Two Centuries of Regional Painting, 1710–1920 (3 Vols.) (1st ed.). New York: Abbeville Press. LCCN 90-598; ISBN 978-1-5585-9033-5, 1-5585-9033-1; OCLC 21441856 (all editions).
1. Vol. 1: New England, New York, the Mid-Atlantic. pp. 95, 98–99 – via Google Books (snippet view).
- Tufts, Eleanor (1984). American Women Artists, Past and Present: A Selected Bibliographic Guide. Garland Reference Library of the Humanities (Vol. 504). New York, London: Garland Publishing. p. 132. LCCN 83-48201; ISBN 978-0-8240-9070-8, 0-8240-9070-5, ISBN 978-0-8240-1511-4, 0-8240-1511-8; OCLC 10723217 (all editions).
1. "Louise Herreshoff [Eaton] (1876–1967) Painter" – via Internet Archive (Kahle/Austin Foundation).
- Whitehead, James Walter (1921–2015) (2006) [2003]. A Fragile Union: The Story of Louise Herreshoff. Forward by Tom Wolfe (1930–2018) (2nd ed.). Richmond, Virginia: Celeste Dervaes Whitehead (1921–2010). ISBN 978-0-9777-2200-6, 0-9777-2200-7; OCLC 71247784 (all editions).
