= Herreshoff Marine Museum =

Maritime museum in Bristol, Rhode Island, USA

Coordinates: 41°39′49.4″N 71°16′22.6″W

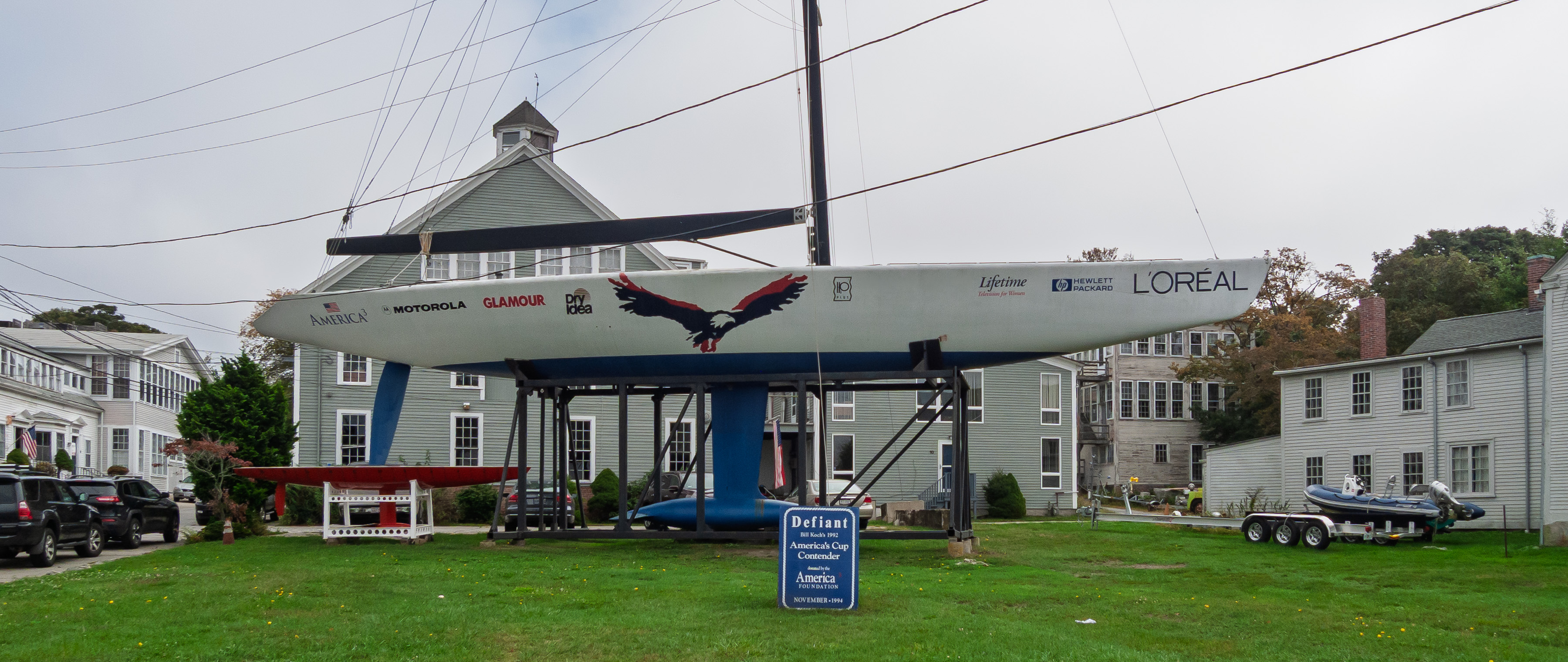
- 2017
- Established: 1971
- Location: 1 Burnside Street, Bristol, Rhode Island, U.S.
- Director: Bill Lynn
- Website: www.herreshoff.org

The Herreshoff Marine Museum is a maritime museum in Bristol, Rhode Island dedicated to the history of the Herreshoff Manufacturing Company, yachting, and America's Cup. The Herreshoff Manufacturing Company (1878–1945) was most notable for producing sailing yachts, including eight America's Cup defenders, and steam-powered vessels.

The museum, situated near Narragansett Bay on the grounds where the manufacturing company once stood, has a collection of over sixty boats including Nathanael Greene Herreshoff's Clara, built in 1887, Harold Vanderbilt's Trivia, and the 1992 IACC yacht, Defiant. The Nathanael Greene Herreshoff Model Room contains over 500 yacht and steam yacht models and the Rebecca Chase Herreshoff Library holds a collection of books and manuscripts related to the company, the Herreshoff family, and yachting. The museum also hosts symposia related to yacht design and operates a sailing school.

== History ==
Herreshoff Marine Museum

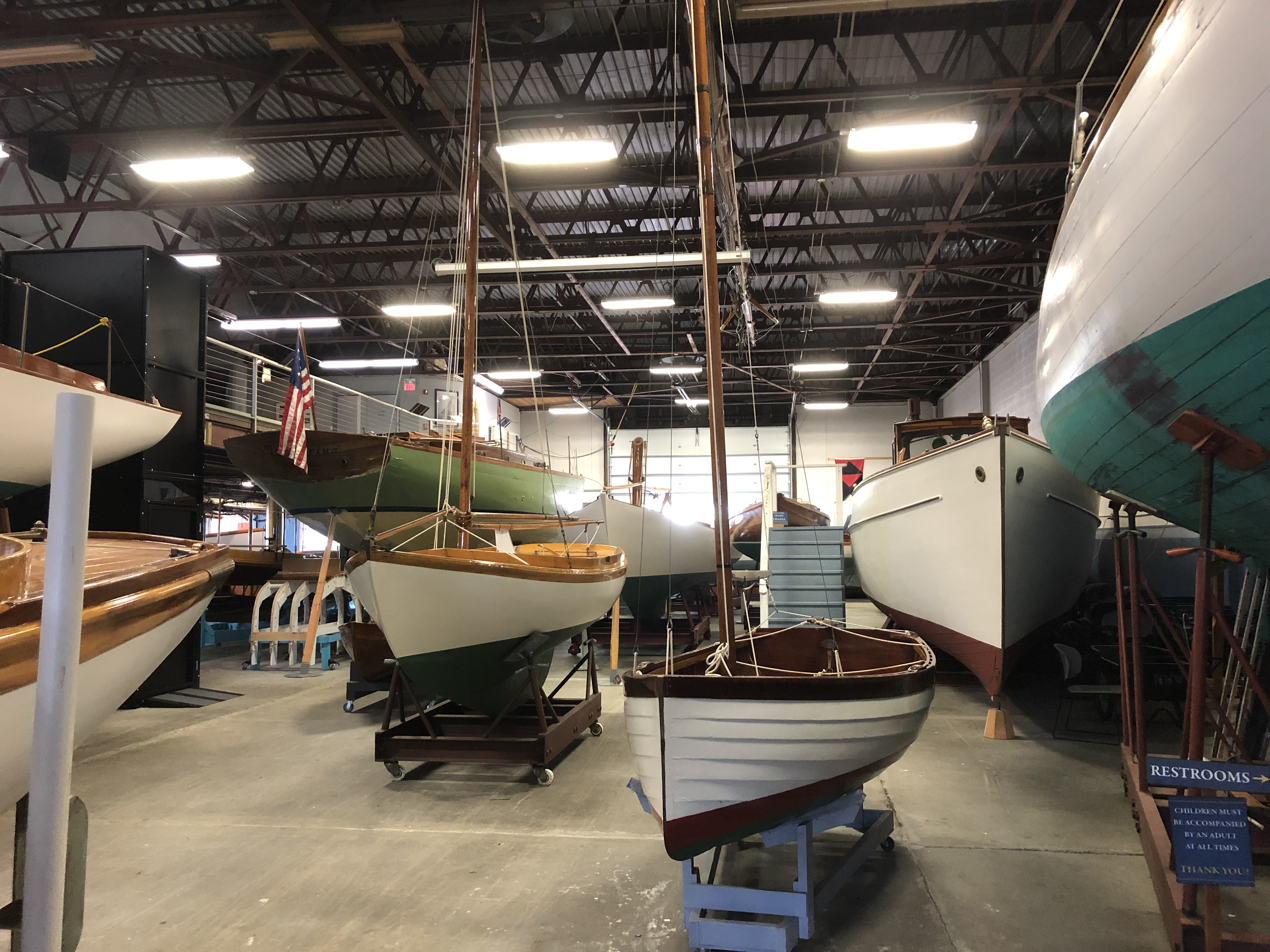
Hall of Boats

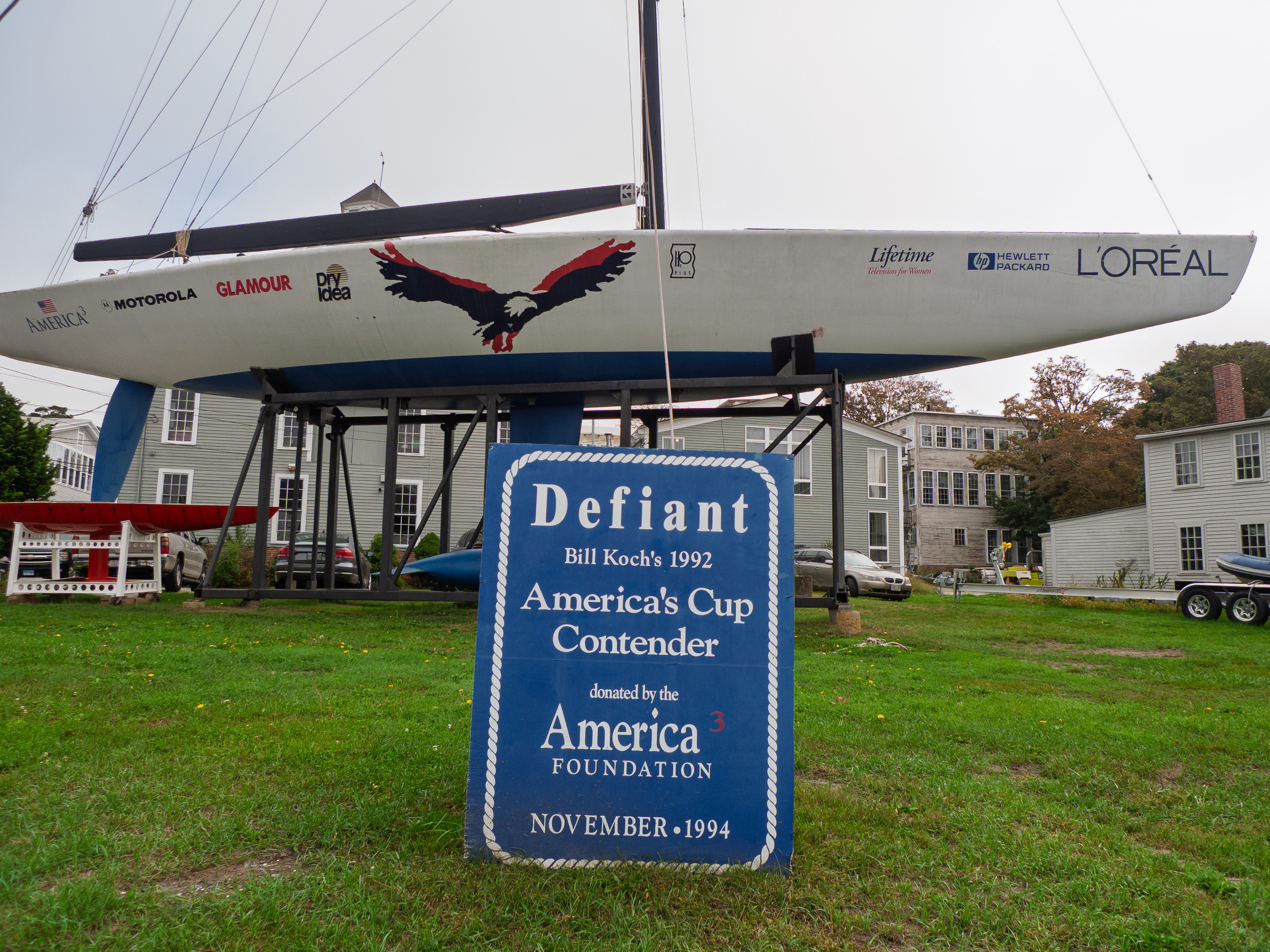
Defiant yacht

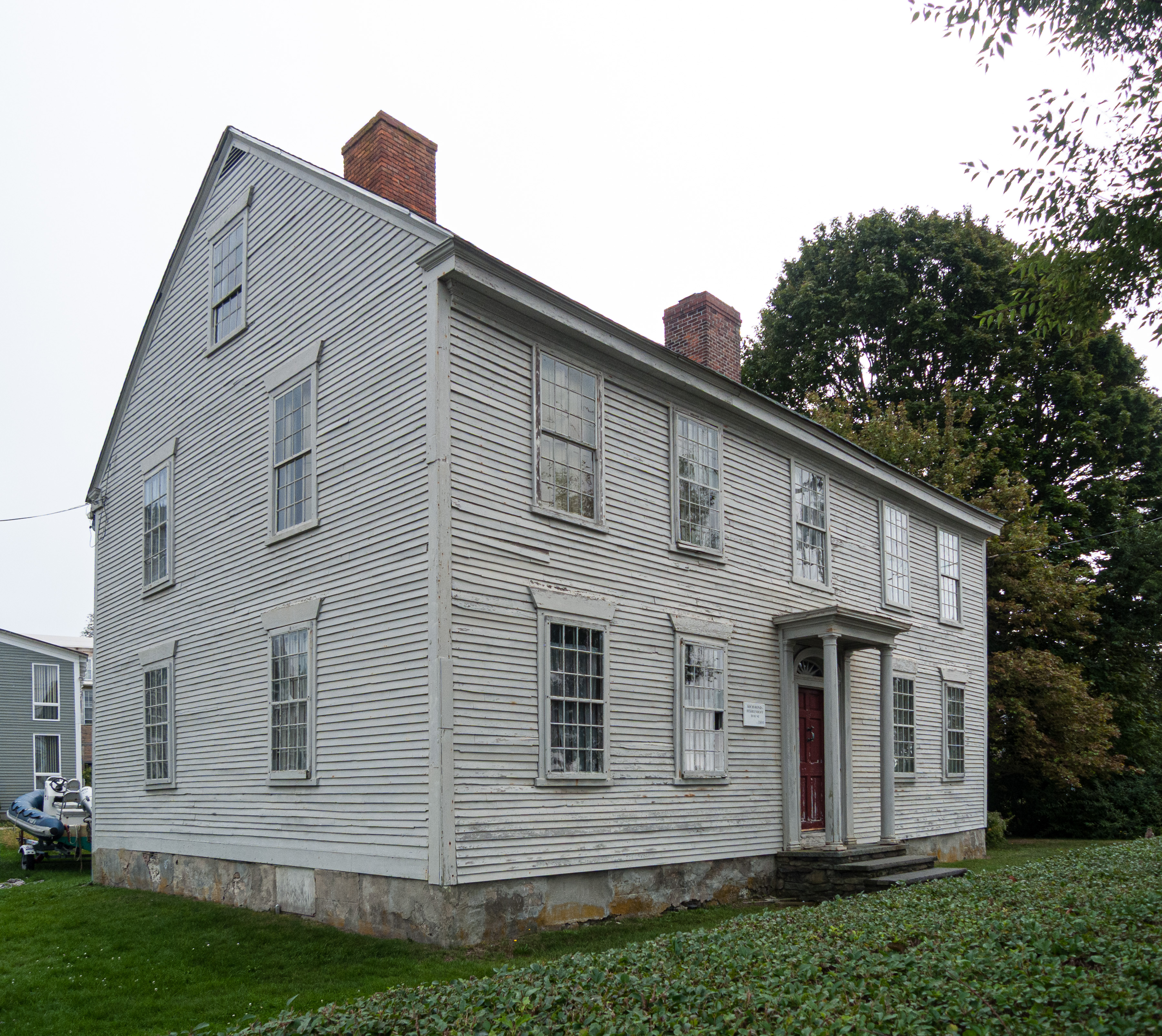
Richmond-Herreshoff House

The museum was founded in 1971 by members of the Herreshoff family to preserve the accomplishments of the Herreshoff Manufacturing Company and its founders, John Brown Herreshoff (1841–1915) and Nathanael Greene Herreshoff (1848–1938).

=== Beginnings ===
In 1970 Halsey Chase Herreshoff, grandson of yacht designer Nathanael Greene Herreshoff, was informed that the yacht THANIA had been bequeathed to a "Herreshoff Marine Museum," which didn't exist at the time. The gift, along with the acquisition of two other boats, inspired the creation of a floating exhibit with that name in 1971. The Herreshoff Marine Museum had no physical space on land until August 1978, when Halsey acquired a storehouse on Burnside Street.

=== Expansion ===
Multiple acquisitions expanded the museum campus along Burnside Street in the 1980s and 1990s. In 1985, the museum acquired most of the former Herreshoff Manufacturing Company waterfront and original manufacturing building. In 1990, Norman Herreshoff bequeathed the adjacent Richmond/Herreshoff House. 1996 saw the creation of the Nathanael Greene Herreshoff Model Room and Workshop.

=== Hall of Fame ===
In 1992, Halsey Herreshoff and the museum board launched the America's Cup Hall of Fame to honor outstanding individuals of the America's Cup yacht race, going back to 1851. The hall has grown to over 100 inductees as of 2025.

== Works ==
Among other works, the company built Doris (Sailing yacht), which is listed on the U.S. National Register of Historic Places.

== See also ==
- Herreshoff family
- List of maritime museums in the United States
- List of museum ships
