= John Brown Francis Herreshoff =

American chemist (1850–1932)

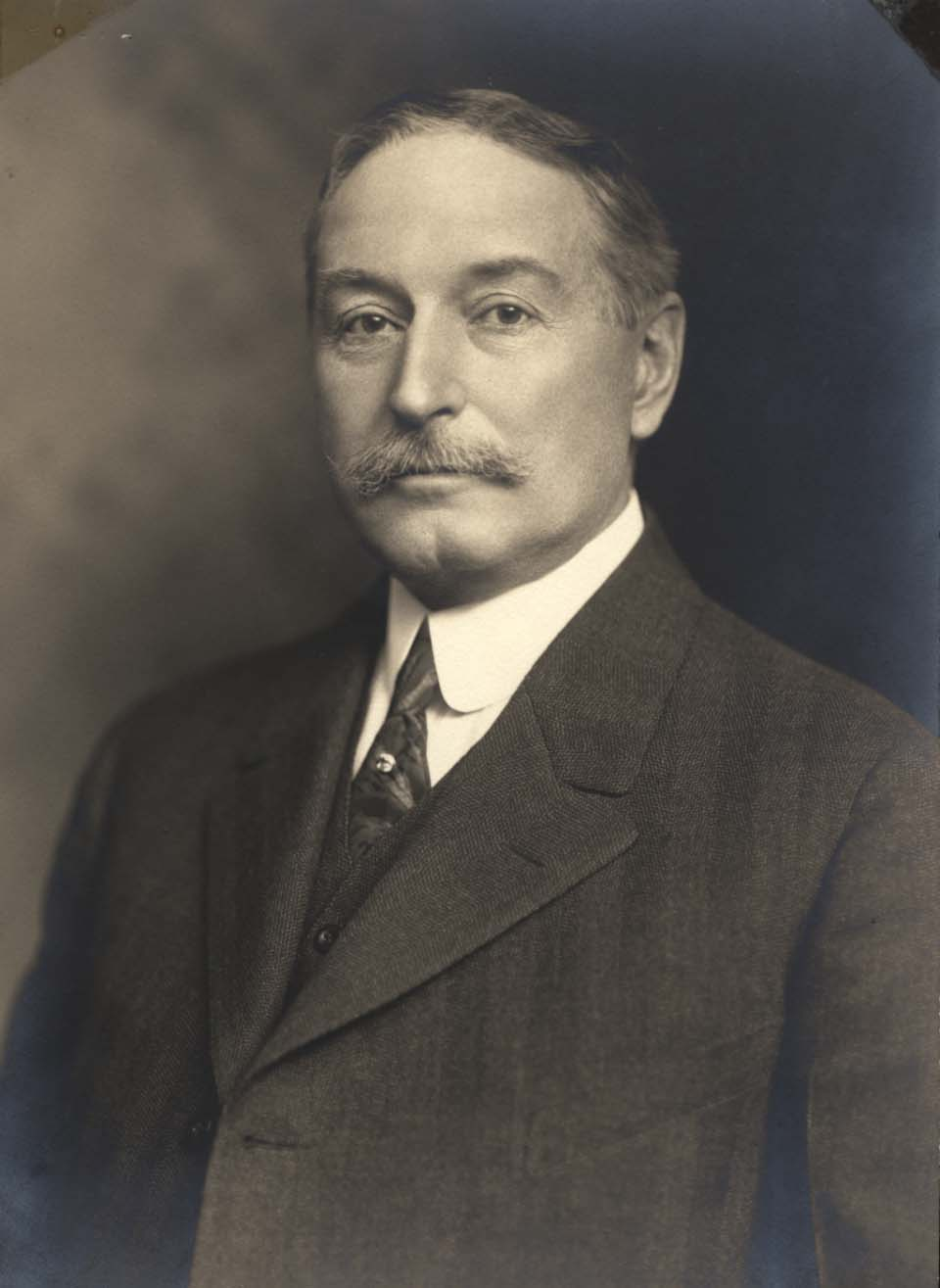
- Herreshoff c. 1900
- Born: February 7, 1850; Bristol, Rhode Island
- Died: January 30, 1932 (aged 81); New York City
- Occupation: Chemist

John Brown Francis Herreshoff (February 7, 1850 – January 30, 1932) was an American chemist and the second winner of the Perkin Medal. He was also the president of The General Chemical Company.

== Career ==
Herreshoff was a metallurgical chemist affiliated with the firm of Herreshoff Manufacturing Company, builders of yachts and torpedo boats. Herreshoff was hired by G. H. Nichols and Company in 1880 or 1882. He invented and built for them a water-jacketed furnace, and quickly became a partner in the company. Others built according to his smelter plans furnaces up to 100 tons in 1890. He was greatly interested in obtaining copper from pyrite ore.

In 1890, Herreshoff developed a form of the contact catalytic process for the company of which he was a partner. In 1892 the Herreshoff process went into large-scale industrial production, and "Nichols Lake Substitute" copper was henceforth a competitor to the "Lake Superior" copper standard of the US Bureau of Mines. By 1895 the Nichols Company was producing high-purity blister copper, cast as bars, ingots and wire.

Herreshoff was made the president of The General Chemical Company, which was founded in 1899 and merged in 1920 with Allied Corporation. In 1900 Herreshoff was made vice-president of the Nichols Copper Company.

In 1908 Herreshoff received the Perkin Medal, an award conferred annually by the American section of the Society of Chemical Industry to a scientist residing in America for an "innovation in applied chemistry resulting in outstanding commercial development". It is one of the highest honors given in the U.S. chemical industry.

=== Patents ===
Drawing of "Copper Smelting Furnace" by JBF Herreshoff for USPTO 273840

- U.S. patent 273840A (1883): Copper smelting furnace
- U.S. patent 304103A (1884): PULLEY BLOCK
- U.S. patent 335699A (1886): Sulphuric acid tower
- U.S. patent 342511A (1886): FIRE DOOR FOR FURNACEs
- U.S. patent 357528A (1887): Process of concentrating sulphuric acid
- U.S. patent 369790A (1887): Apparatus for concentrating sulphuric acid
- U.S. patent 374239A (1887): APPARATUS FOR SEPARATING LEAD OR BASE BULLION FROM SLAG, MATTES, AND SPEISS
- U.S. patent 549641A (1895): Chimney
- U.S. patent 556750A (1896): Roasting furnace
- U.S. patent 616926A (1899): Roasting furnace
- U.S. patent 669696A (1900): Apparatus for casting metal
- U.S. patent 719332A (1902): Method of making sulfuric anhydrid
- U.S. patent 719333A (1902): Apparatus for the manufacture of sulfuric anhydrid
- U.S. patent 722981A (1902): Process of making sulfuric acid
- U.S. patent 737625A (1903): Process of making sulfuric acid
- U.S. patent 940595A (1906): Purification of burner-gases
- U.S. patent 940596A (1906): Apparatus for purifying burner-gases
- U.S. patent 976175A (1909): Ore-roasting furnace
- U.S. patent 1047521A (1910): Reverberatory furnace
- U.S. patent 1066110A (1910): Furnace for roasting ores
- U.S. patent 1085419A (1912): Roasting-furnace
- U.S. patent 1609873A (1925): Condenser

== Personal life ==
Herreshoff was born February 7, 1850, in Bristol, Rhode Island, to Charles Frederick Herreshoff III (1809–1888) and Julia Ann Lewis (maiden; 1811–1901).

John Brown Francis Herreshoff was married four times. He first married – on February 9, 1876 – Grace Eugenia Dyer (maiden; 1851–1880), with whom he had a daughter, the painter Louise Chamberlain Herreshoff (1876–1967).

After Dyer's death, he married – on October 25, 1882, in Philadelphia – Emaline Duval ("Mildred") Lee (maiden; 1863–1930). From that marriage, he had two sons and a daughter. One of the sons, Frederick Herreshoff (1888–1920), became a noted American amateur golfer. Through his daughter from that marriage, Sarah Lothrop Herreshoff (1889–1958), he is the grandfather of the Italian painter Guido Borgianni (1914–2011). Herreshoff and Lee divorced June 4, 1919, in Manhattan.

Five days later, on June 9, 1919, Herreshoff married Carrie Lucas Ridley (maiden; 1878–1924), her second. On October 5, 1924 (six months after Carrie's death), Herreshoff married Carrie's sister, Irma Grey Ridley (1872–1946).

Herreshoff died January 30, 1932, at the home of his daughter in New York City.
