= Nathanael Greene Herreshoff =

American naval architect

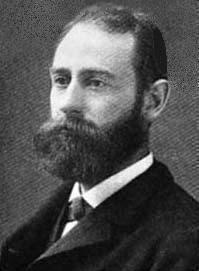
- Herreshoff circa 1898
- Born: March 18, 1848; Bristol, Rhode Island, US
- Died: June 2, 1938 (aged 90); Bristol, Rhode Island, US
- Other name: Nickname: Captain Nat
- Occupations: Naval architect Mechanical engineer
- Known for: Designing motor and sailing yachts, especially America's Cup defenders between 1893-1920
- Spouses: Clara Anna DeWolf; Ann Roebuck
- Children: 2, including Lewis Francis Herreshoff
- Relatives: J. B. F. Herreshoff, brother John Brown Herreshoff, brother Charles F. Herreshoff, nephew Halsey Chase Herreshoff, grandson

Nathanael Greene Herreshoff (March 18, 1848 – June 2, 1938) was an American naval architect, mechanical engineer, and yacht design innovator. He produced a succession of undefeated America's Cup defenders between 1893 and 1920, all for the New York Yacht Club (NYYC).

== Biography ==
Herreshoff was born on March 18, 1848, in Bristol, Rhode Island and was named after General Nathanael Greene. He was one of seven brothers.

He graduated from the Massachusetts Institute of Technology in 1870 with a three-year degree in mechanical engineering. After graduation, he took a position with the Corliss Steam Engine Company in Providence, Rhode Island. For the 1876 Centennial Exposition in Philadelphia, Pennsylvania, he designed and personally installed the Corliss Stationary Engine, a 40-foot-tall (12 m), 1,400-horsepower (1,000 kW) dynamo that powered the exhibition's machinery.

In 1878 Herreshoff returned to Bristol where he and one of his brothers, John Brown Herreshoff (1841–1915), who was blind, formed the Herreshoff Manufacturing Company. Nathanael provided the engineering expertise and John provided the business expertise, managing the firm's personnel and interacting with clients. Together, they grew the business from about 20 employees to over 400. Herreshoff's talent for innovation found expression in both design and light-construction techniques. They built a variety of fast, steam-powered vessels and military craft. Having started its design since 1876, The Herreshoffs built the first torpedo spar boat for the U.S. Navy. Lightning, that was purchased for experimental evaluation in 1878.

In 1885, Stiletto, a wooden torpedo boat with a length of 94 feet, 31 tons of displacement and a speed of 18.2 knots was launched at the Herreshoff Manufacturing Co. as a private speculation. It was purchased for the United States Navy under an Act of Congress dated 3 March 1887, and entered service in July 1887, attached to the Naval Torpedo Station in Newport Rhode Island. USS Stiletto was the Navy's first torpedo boat capable of launching self-propelled torpedoes.

In 1888, a serious accident occurred while Herreshoff was supervising speed trials of a 138-foot (42 m), 875-horsepower (652 kW) steamboat named Say When. After a safety valve opened to release over-pressure, Herreshoff closed it so the boat could achieve its anticipated maximum speed. But a boiler exploded, fatally injuring a member of the crew. Consequently, Herreshoff lost his steam engineer's license.

== Yacht building ==
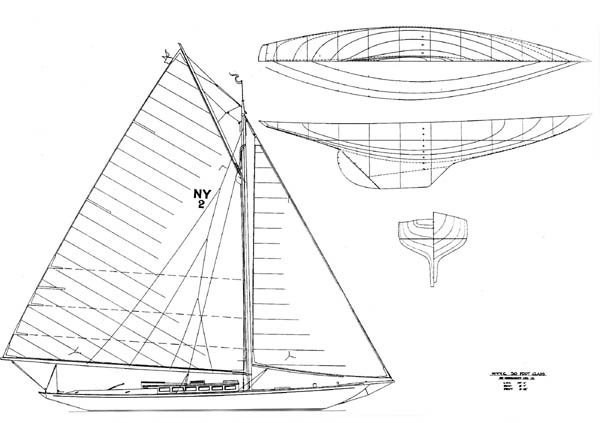
New York 30 class design

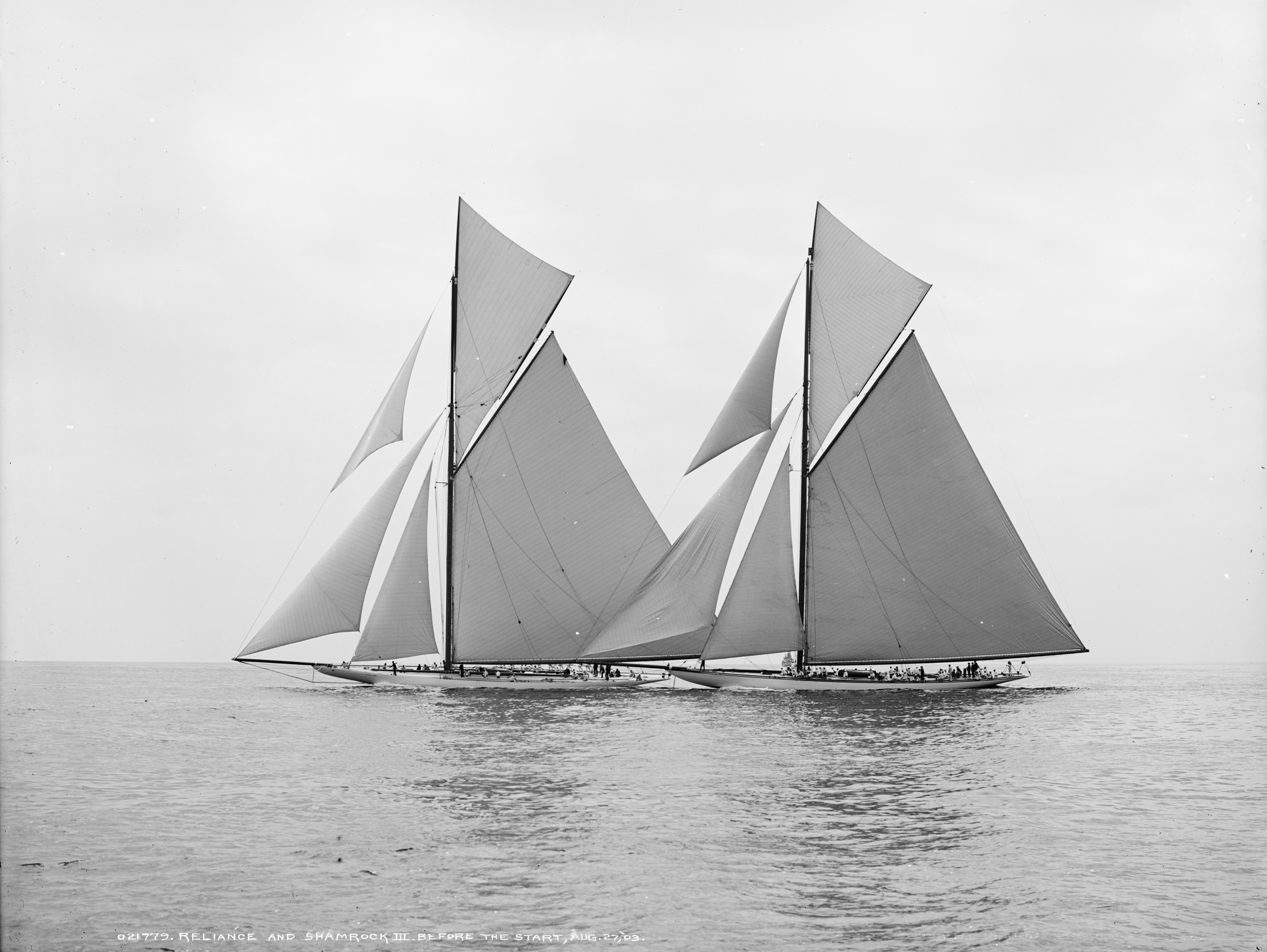
Reliance ahead of Shamrock III, Sir Thomas Lipton's 1903 America's Cup contender designed by William Fife

The Herreshoff Manufacturing Company's (HMCo) early work centered on steam-powered vessels, such as SY Stiletto built in 1885 and sold to the US navy in 1887 having been converted into a torpedo boat USS Stiletto). This was small but fast (23 knots). Other sister ships by Herreshoff for the Navy were USS Lightning, USS Cushing, USS Du Port, USS Porter, USS Cushing, USS Twin and USS Talbot.

By the 1890s the Herreshoffs turned to the design and construction of yachts for wealthy American clients, including Jay Gould, William Randolph Hearst, John Pierpont Morgan, Cornelius Vanderbilt III, Harold Stirling Vanderbilt, William Kissam Vanderbilt II, Harry Payne Whitney and Alexander Smith Cochran. Herreshoff boat production incorporated power tools that increased productivity at a high level of quality, using craftsmen that received the highest boatbuilder wages in the state of Rhode Island.

Herreshoff was noted as an innovative sailboat designer of his time. His designs ranged from the 12½, a 16-foot (12½ foot waterline) sailboat for training the children of yachtsmen, to the 144-foot America's Cup Reliance, with a sail area of 16,000 square feet. He received the first US patent for a sailing catamaran. The firm built the America's Cup winning Cup yachts Enterprise (1930), and Rainbow (1934), designed by Starling Burgess. Every winning America's Cup Yacht from 1893 to 1934 was built by the Herreshoff yard.

In 1912 the New York Yacht Club asked Herreshoff to design and build a 50-foot racing sloop for its members. Herreshoff Manufacturing Company ended up constructing nine New York 50s, of which Spartan survives to this day.

The 123-foot Defender featured steel-framing, bronze plating up to the waterline and aluminum topsides to achieve a lighter and faster boat. This combination of materials had been pioneered in the French fresh-water racing yacht Vendenesse, which had been described in a New York Times article and caught the attention of the Vanderbilt Americacup syndicate. In salt water, Defender was subject to galvanic corrosion, which limited its durability in water. Defender won the America's Cup in 1895 over Lord Dunraven's Valkyrie III, and she was used as an effective trial-horse for Herreshoff's new Cup defender Columbia in 1899. She was broken up in 1901.

Those of the 2,000-plus designs by Herreshoff that survive are sought by connoisseurs of classic yachts. Herreshoff S-Class sailboats, designed in 1919 and built until 1941, are still actively raced in Narragansett Bay, Buzzards Bay and Western Long Island Sound (Larchmont, New York). His 12½ design of 1914 is still being built and raced in New England as well. The New York 30 is well regarded as a one-design racer/cruiser.

== World War II ==
In the 1942 the shipyard built wooden hull APc-1-class small coastal transports to support the World War II demand for ships.

The shipyard built wooden hull PT boats (PT-430 to PT-449) used in the Lend-Lease program in 1944. The shipyard also built for Great Britain PT Boat (BPT), called MTB (MTB-288 to MTB-294).

== Legacy ==
Herreshoff was an accomplished sailor, and was inducted into the National Sailing Hall of Fame in 2011.

Two of Herreshoff's sons, Sidney Dewolf Herreshoff and Lewis Francis Herreshoff, also became yacht designers.

In 1921, Herreshoff was elected an honorary member of the American Society of Mechanical Engineers in recognition of his contributions to steam engineer and ship building.

He died on June 2, 1938, in Bristol, Rhode Island.

The Herreshoff Marine Museum preserves Herreshoff's legacy at the former site of the Herreshoff Manufacturing Co.

== Notable vessels ==
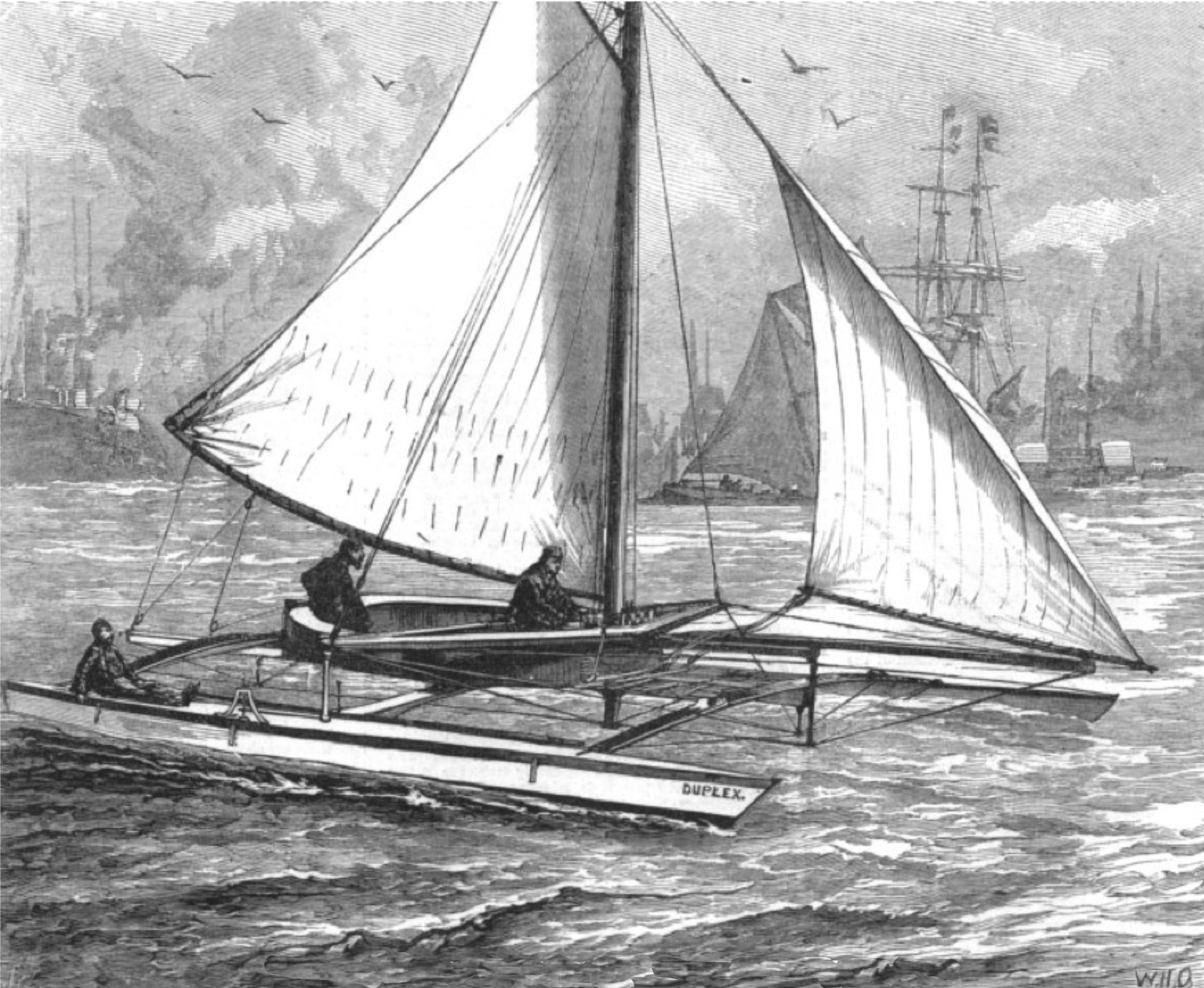
Herreshoff catamaran, Duplex, on the River Thames—built in 1877, was 31 ft long.

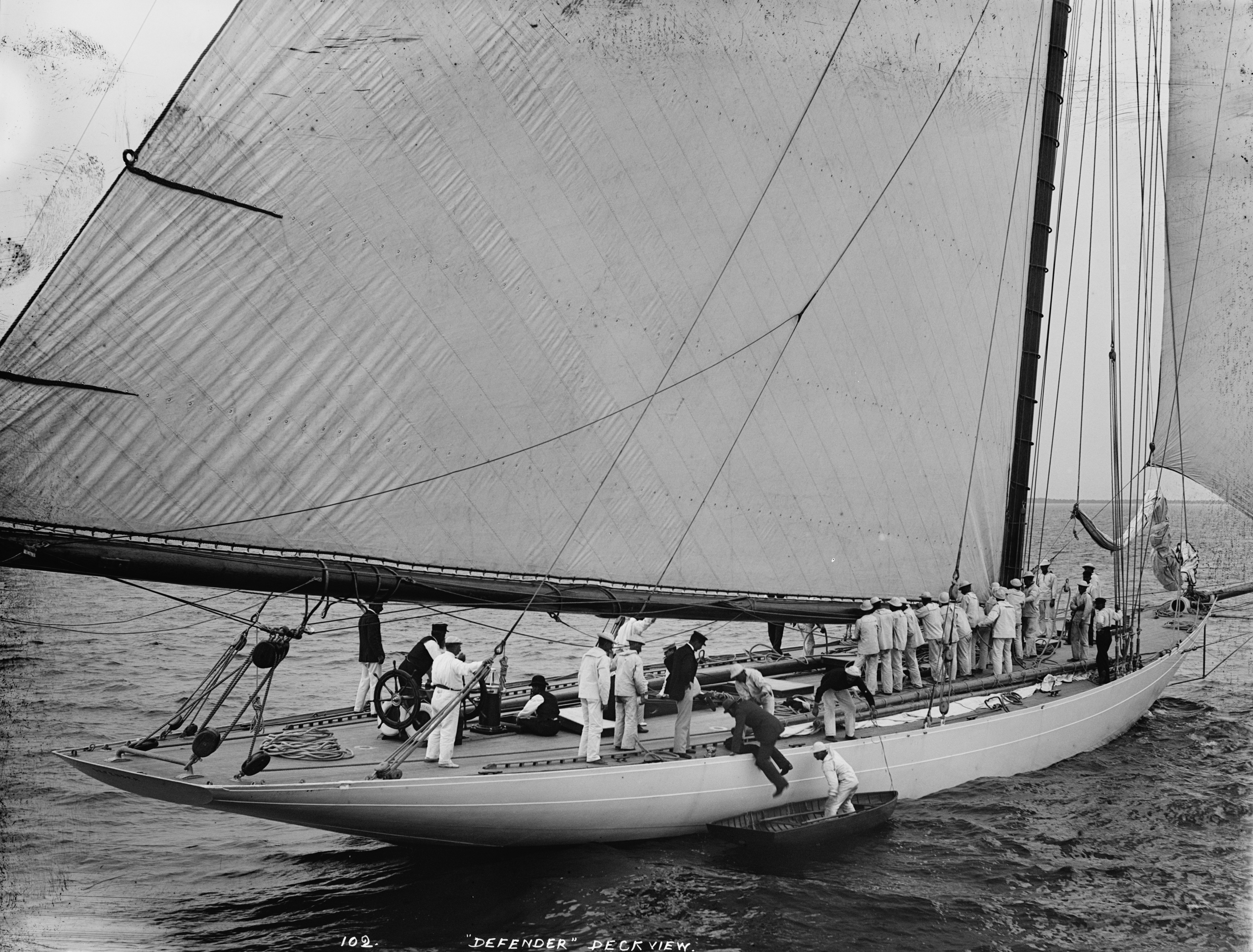
Nathanael Herreshoff climbing aboard Defender in 1895; photograph by John S. Johnston

=== Steam vessels ===
- Lightning—the US Navy's first purpose-built torpedo boat—a speed record breaking steam launch with a spar torpedo, 1876.
- Peruvian Torpedo boats in the War of the Pacific, (1879-1883).
- SY Now Then (1887) and SY Say When (1888)for New York publisher Norman Munro
- SY Ballymena (1888) the first yacht to have a steel hull.
- Sy Vamoose (1890) for William Randolph Hearst sold to Norman Munro in 1894, and ultimately owned by J. A. Pugh

=== Sailing vessels ===
In the last quarter of the 19th century, Herreshoff constructed a double-hulled sailing boat of his own design (US Pat. No. 189,459). The craft, Amaryllis, raced at her maiden regatta on June 22, 1876, and performed exceedingly well. Her debut demonstrated the distinct performance advantages afforded by catamarans over the standard monohulls.

In 1892 he build Wee Win a ½ rater for Winifred Sutton, daughter of Sir Richard Sutton, 5th Baronet, whose yacht Genesta had been beaten in the 1885 America's cup by Puritan. Wee Win was very successful racing on the Solent, leading to several follow-up orders from British Yachtswomen and Yachtsmen.

- Amaryllis – sailing catamaran, 1876
- Tarantella – catamaran, 1877
- Westward – racing yacht, 1910
- Helianthus III, 1924
- Herreshoff Bull's Eye
- Herreshoff 12½

=== America's Cup yachts ===
Herreshoff designed and built the following America's Cup contenders. All won the series against their challengers. Herreshoff was the helmsman of Vigilant.

- Vigilant, 1893
- Defender, 1895
- Columbia, 1899 & 1901
- Reliance, 1903
- Resolute, 1920

== Technical achievements ==
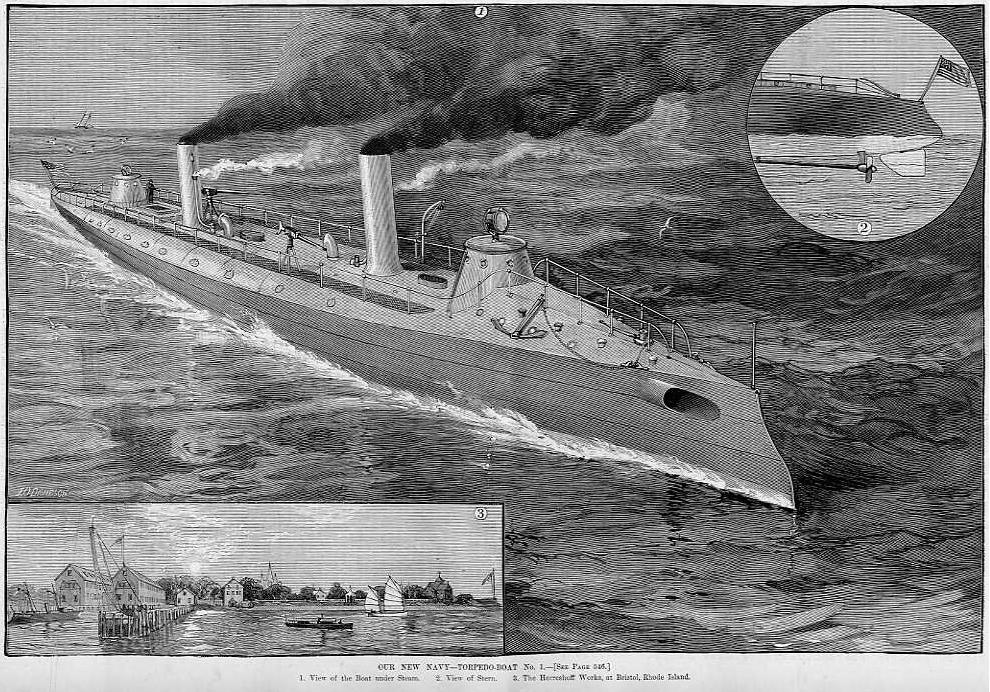
Herreshoff torpedo boat, engraving from Harper's Weekly, June 1889

According to his son's biography, Herreshoff's achievements include:

1. Built the first torpedo boat, USS Cushing (TB-1), for the U.S. Navy.
2. Developed bulb and fin keels for large boats.
3. Updated the sail track and slide.
4. Invented the crosscut sail, with panels running at right angles to the leech, in order to combat cotton canvas' tendency to distort under load.

== See also ==
- Herreshoff Marine Museum

== Bibliography ==
- Bray, Maynard; Pinheiro, Carlton (1989). Herreshoff of Bristol: A Photographic History of America's Greatest Yacht and Boat Builders. Brooklin: Woodenboat Publications. ISBN 978-0-937822-19-7.
- Grant, I. A. (1977). "The Herreshoff Spar Torpedo Boats of 1878–1880". Warship International. XIV (3): 253–261. ISSN 0043-0374.
- Herreshoff, Nathanael G. Recollections and Other Writings (Bristol, RI: Herreshoff Marine Museum)
- Herreshoff, Nathanael G. and William Picard Stephens, annotated by John W. Streeter, Nathanael Greene Herreshoff, William Picard Stephens: Their Last Letters 1930-1938 (Bristol, RI: Herreshoff Marine Museum) 1998.
- Page, Franco (2008). Herreshoff and his Yachts. Brooklin: Woodenboat Publications. ISBN 978-0-937822-98-2.
- Simpson, Richard V. (2007). Bristol, Rhode Island's Herreshoff yachts. Charleston, South Carolina: The History Press. ISBN 978-1-59629-306-9. OCLC 226055968.
