= Ronald R. Van Stockum =

Brigadier general in the US Marine Corps (1916–2022)

Ronald Reginald Van Stockum
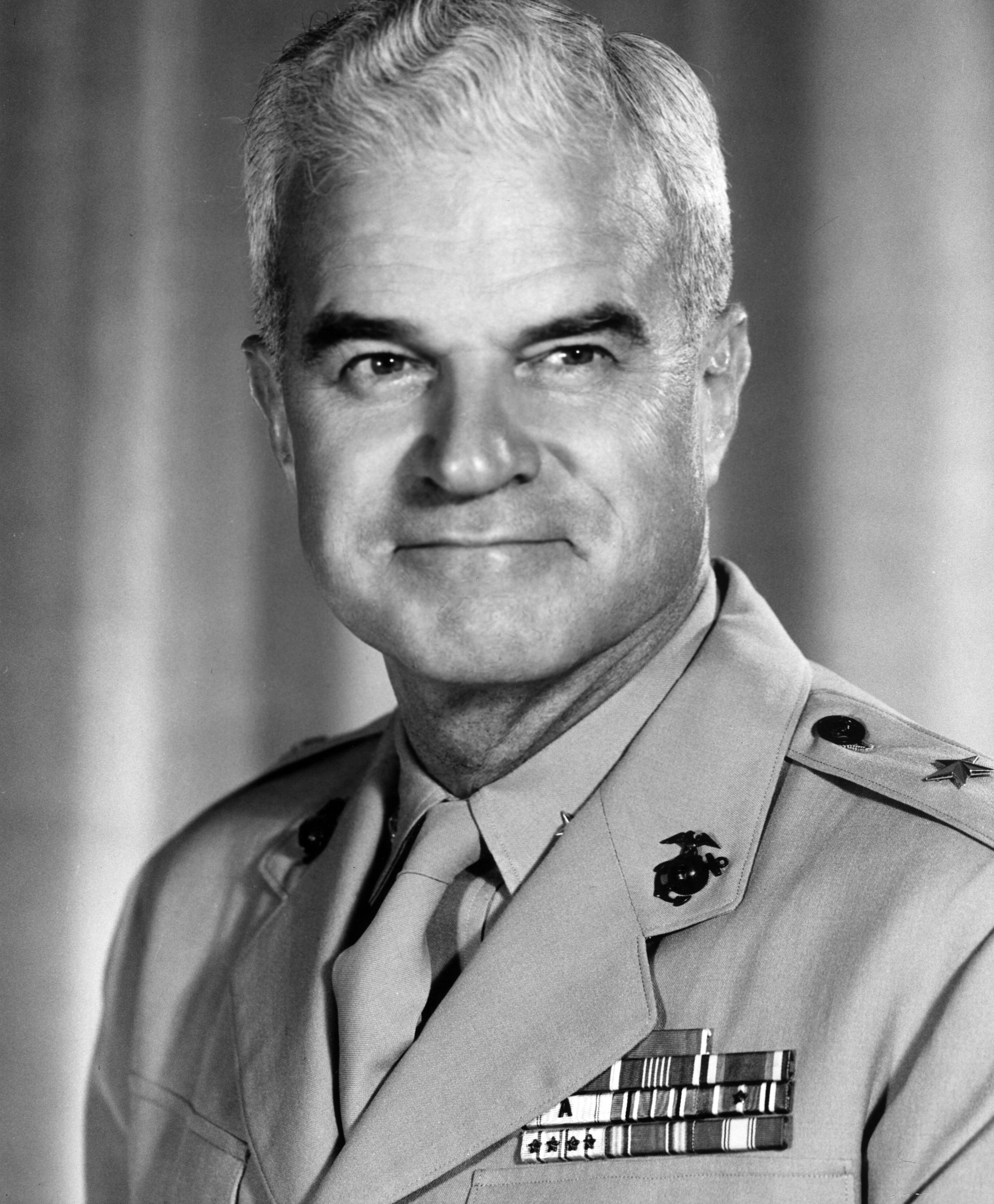
- Van Stockum in 1962
- Born: Ronald Reginald Bareham; July 8, 1916; Newton, Cambridgeshire, England
- Died: April 24, 2022 (aged 105); Shelby County, Kentucky, U.S.
- Military career
- Allegiance: United States
- Branch: United States Marine Corps
- Service years: 1937–1969
- Rank: Brigadier general
- Service number: 0-5643
- Commands: Marine Corps Reserve; Landing Force Training Unit, Pacific; 8th Marine Regiment; 1st Battalion, 3rd Marines
- Conflicts: World War II: Siege of Malta; Bougainville Campaign; Recapture of Guam; Battle of Iwo Jima
- Awards: Legion of Merit (2); Bronze Star Medal; Commendation Medal

Ronald Reginald Van Stockum (July 8, 1916 – April 24, 2022) was a decorated officer of the United States Marine Corps with the rank of brigadier general. A veteran of Bougainville, Guam and Iwo Jima campaigns, Van Stockum was most noted for his service as director of the Marine Corps Reserve and later as commanding general of the Fleet Marine Force, Pacific (Forward) on Okinawa during the Vietnam War.

== Early career ==
Van Stockum was born as Ronald Reginald Bareham on July 8, 1916, in Newton, Cambridgeshire, England, the son of Reginald George Bareham and Florence Rosetta Freestone. He never met his father, who was killed in action, while serving as sergeant with the British Army during the Battle of the Somme on July 1, 1916, a week after his 22nd birthday and a week before Ronald's birth. In early 1918, his mother Florence joined the newly established Women's Royal Air Force, serving as an ambulance driver until a few months after the end of World War I, when the WRAF was deactivated.

During the war, while stationed at Fowlmere Airfield, which was occupied by American forces at the time, Florence met U.S. Sergeant Anton William Van Stockum, native of the Netherlands, who while living in the United States had volunteered for the U.S. Army Air Corps. He was stationed at Duxford with, the 137th Aero Squadron. Van Stockum later went to France with his unit during the final months of World War I. They carried on a correspondence, which continued after he had returned to Seattle, Washington where he was employed as a grader in the lumber industry.

Because his mother Florence was not a U.S. citizen, she was denied entry to the United States. The obvious solution to the problem was marriage with Anton. They were married on May 20, 1920, and Florence and infant Ronald were allowed entry into the United States. Ronald was later also adopted by Anton and renamed Van Stockum.

Ronald grew up in Washington state and completed the grade school in Bellingham, Washington. He later graduated from the high school in Yakima, Washington, and entered the University of Washington in Seattle, where he graduated in June 1937 with a bachelor's degree. During his time at the university, he completed the ROTC course and was commissioned as a second lieutenant in the Marine Corps. Also, he was active on the YMCA student board.

Following his graduation, his first assignment as a Second Lieutenant on August 4, 1937, was to the Basic School at Philadelphia Navy Yard for Marine Corps Officer instruction. Van Stockum had the opportunity to work with great names in the modern Marine Corps history like, for example, Gilder D. Jackson Jr., Chesty Puller, Leonard B. Cresswell, Frank B. Goettge, Russell N. Jordahl, Walfried M. Fromhold, Howard N. Kenyon and Roy M. Gulick, who served as instructors during his time at the school. At the end of instruction, Van Stockum received the highest marks in Drill and Command.

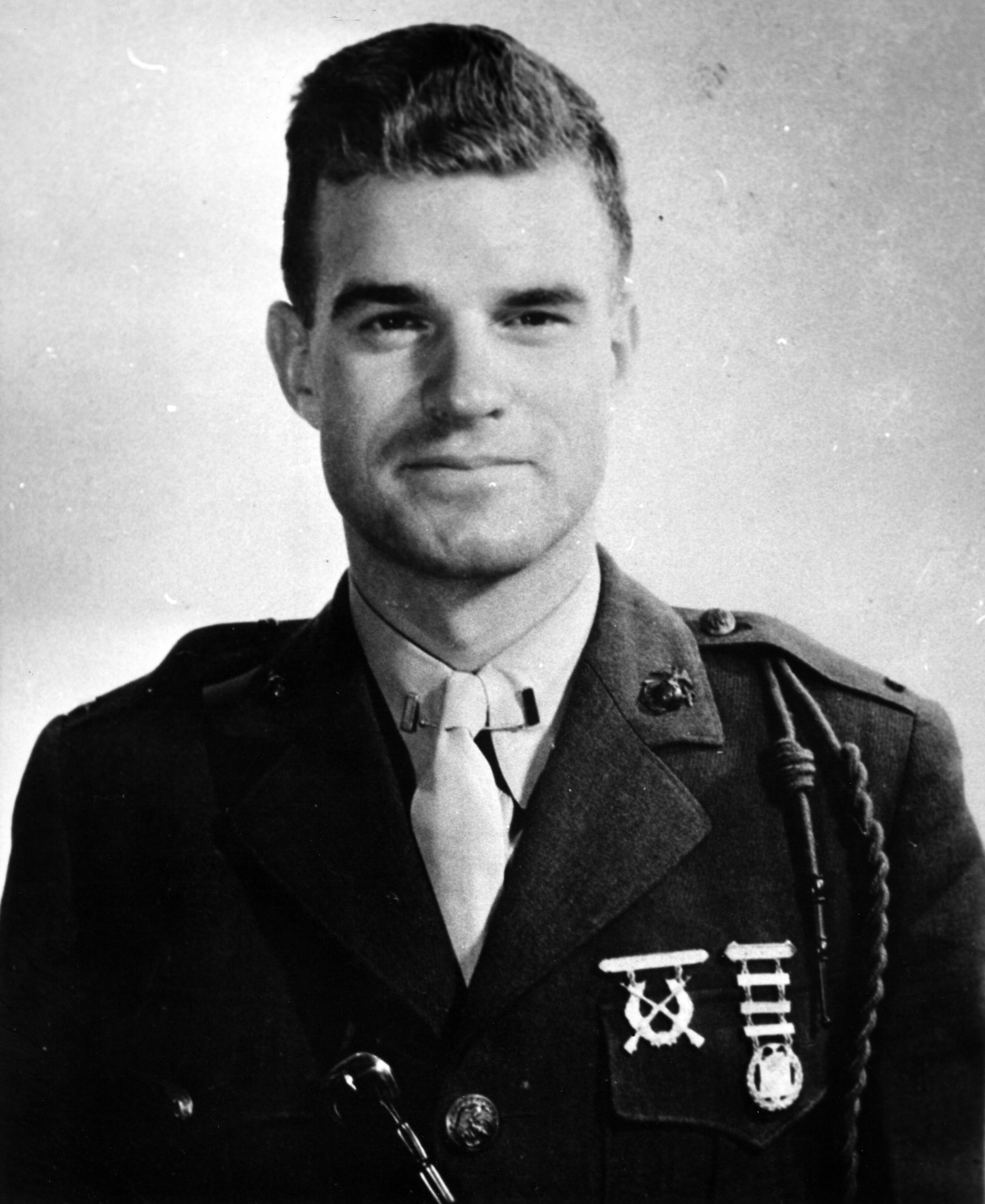
Van Stockum as a 2nd Lieutenant in June 1939.

He completed the school at the end of May 1938 and travelled to the West Coast. Van Stockum subsequently completed Secondary Battery Gunnery School on board USS Nevada and then joined the Marine detachment aboard the battleship USS Tennessee, anchored off San Pedro, California. which was subsequently ordered to New York through the Panama Canal for participation in Fleet Problem XX and “showing the flag” at the World's Fair of 1939. After one year of sea duty, Van Stockum was ordered to San Diego in mid-May 1939 and attached to the 1st Battalion, 6th Marine Regiment under Lieutenant Colonel Oliver P. Smith. He remained with that unit until January 1941 and then was ordered again for sea duties as a member of the Marine detachment aboard the aircraft carrier USS Wasp. He subsequently participated in the Neutrality patrols in the stretch between Bermuda and Hampton Roads and following the United States entry into World War II, Van Stockum was promoted to the rank of captain in February 1942 and succeeded Captain August Larson in command of the detachment aboard. He then participated in the relief of Malta, when Wasp delivered 47 Spitfires fighter planes within the Operations Calendar and Bowery in April and May 1942.

Van Stockum was then transferred from the Wasp and was assigned to Camp Lejeune, North Carolina, where, having been promoted to the rank of Major, he formed the Heavy Weapons Company, Company D, 1st Battalion, 21st Marines under lieutenant colonel Ernest W. Fry Jr. The Wasp left for the Southwest Pacific shortly thereafter and was sunk off Guadalcanal on September 15, 1942. His relief, Captain John Kennedy, was lost in the sinking.

His battalion was ordered to San Diego, California, in July 1942 and Van Stockum assumed duty as battalion's executive officer. His unit was ordered to the Pacific Area in early 1943 and arrived to Auckland, New Zealand on February 20. Van Stockum participated in the intensive training on Guadalcanal until November 1943, when he sailed for forthcoming campaign – Bougainville Island, North Solomon Islands.

Van Stockum participated in the amphibious landing on Cape Torokina on November 6 and spent almost two months in rain and mud conditions. He also took part in the battle of Hellzapoppin Ridge at the beginning of December 1943 and except for the several front-line inspections, he spent a night in a foxhole. Van Stockum later assumed additional responsibility as commander of Battalion's Weapons company and remained on Bougainville until January 9, 1944, when 21st Regiment was ordered back to Guadalcanal. Van Stockum was decorated with the Bronze Star Medal with Combat "V" for his service on Bougainville.

Following the period of training, Van Stockum sailed with 1st Battalion to Guam on July 21, 1944, and went ashore with first waves of troops on Asan Beach. During a vicious Japanese counterattack the night of July 25–26, he proceeded alone to the front lines located at the top of a cliff. Here he reported by radio that the front lines had held even though the Japanese had infiltrated and passed down the valleys to attack the rear installations.

After this campaign, he was promoted to the rank of lieutenant colonel and assumed command of 1st Battalion, 3rd Marines under Colonel James A. Stuart. He subsequently spent several months on Guam with mopping-up operations against scattered Japanese soldiers. His battalion was scheduled to take part in the battle of Iwo Jima in February 1945, but remained in floating reserve off shore, in position where he observed the famous incident of the US flag being raised on Mt. Suribachi on February 23, 1945.

== Post-war career ==
Van Stockum returned to the United States in April 1945 and assumed duty as an instructor, Troop Training Unit, Pacific Fleet at Camp Pendleton, California, under Brigadier General Harry K. Pickett. He was engaged in training of Army and Marine units in Amphibious Operations until January 1947, when he was ordered to Minneapolis, Minnesota, for duty as Inspector-Instructor with 4th Marine Reserve Infantry Battalion.

=== Incident in Minneapolis ===
The Inspector-Instructor, a regular officer with a small staff, provided administrative and logistic support to a reserve unit composed of officers and men who came on duty a weekend a month for training. The commanding officer was a reserve officer, actually in command of the unit, who actually relied heavily on the advice of his regular counterpart. This assignment in Minneapolis later showed as crucial in his career. Van Stockum had conflict with the reserve Colonel, a commanding officer of the battalion who had a drinking problem. Van Stockum reported this incident to the director of marine reserve district, Colonel Walker A. Reaves, who requested official investigation. The Inspector general, Brigadier General Robert Blake, sent Colonel James M. Masters Sr., who found Van Stockum's complaint legitimate and relieved the reserve Colonel of his command. He was also supported in a private letter from the director, Marine Corps Reserve, Brigadier General William T. Clement. This whole incident would be reflected later during his promotion to the general's rank.

=== 1947–1962 ===
Van Stockum was transferred to the same position with reserve battalion in New York City in June 1948 and remained in that command for one year. He was subsequently ordered to the Senior Course at the Amphibious Warfare School at Quantico, Virginia. Van Stockum graduated in June 1950 and assumed duty as Senior Marine Officer, Amphibious Group Two under Rear Admiral Harold D. Baker.

During this assignment he participated in an amphibious exercise at Onslow Beach near Camp Lejeune, North Carolina, and later attended the winter course at the Army Arctic Indoctrination School in Big Delta, Alaska. Also, during this tour, Van Stockum and his command participated in Operation Blue Jay above the Arctic Circle at Thule, Greenland, in cooperation with the Army Transportation Corps, the U.S. Air Force, and civilian contractors for the construction of the airbase in that area. He was promoted to colonel in July 1951.

Van Stockum was transferred to the Naval Training Center, Great Lakes, Illinois, in July 1952 and assumed duty as commanding officer of the Marine detachment there and district Marine officer. It was during the Korean War, when many sailors and marines deserted or were AWOL. They were confined here awaiting trial, awaiting bad conduct or undesirable discharges or serving short sentences.

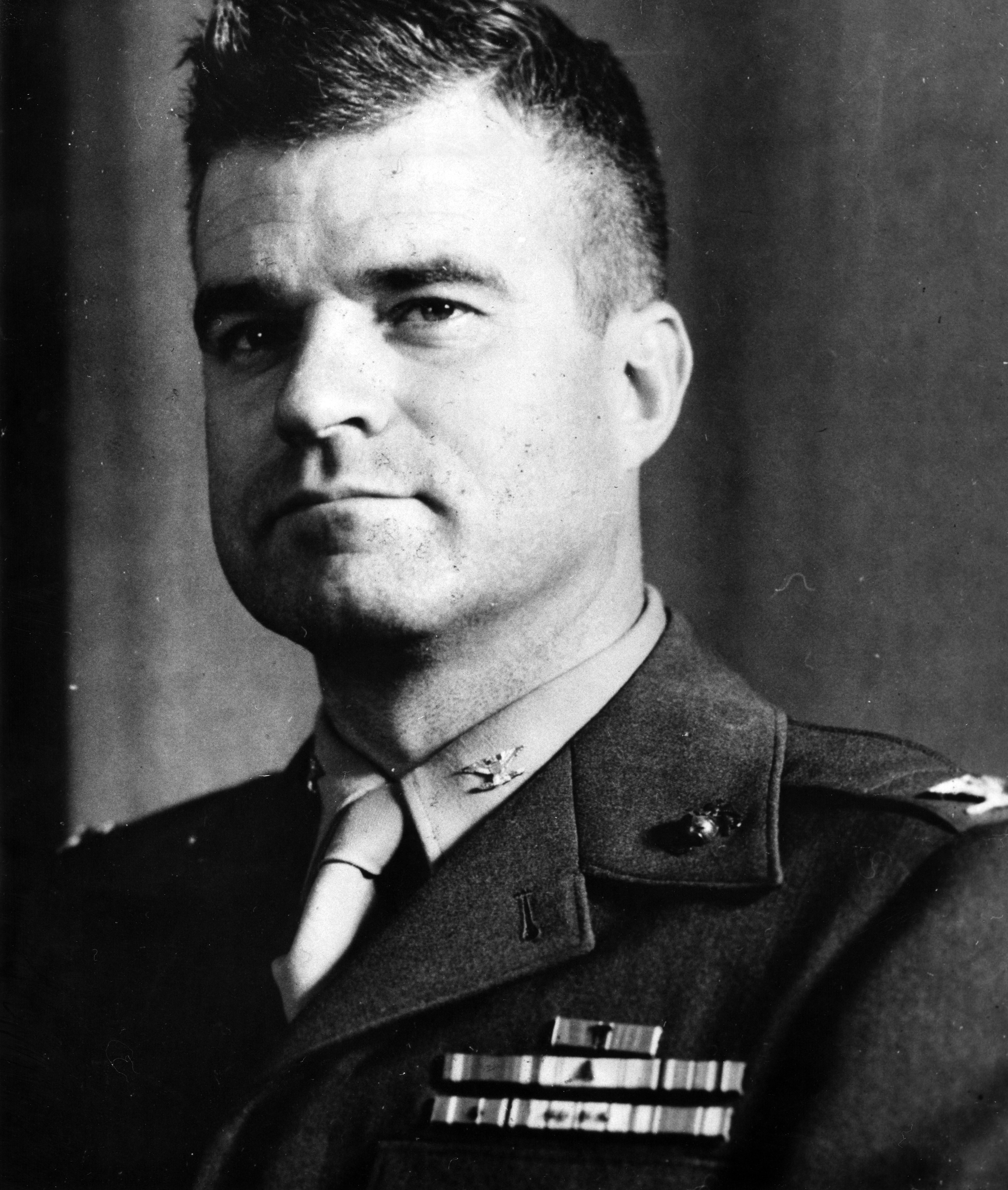
Van Stockum as Colonel in 1950s.

He was ordered to Gifu, Japan in August 1954 and joined the staff of 3rd Marine Division under Major General James P. Riseley. Van Stockum served as a divisional intelligence officer (G-2) until June of the following year and then joined the Headquarters of Far East Command in Tokyo under General Lyman Lemnitzer. He served as Lemnitzer's commandant of the headquarters. Van Stockum remained in this capacity until the end of June 1957 and received Army Commendation Medal from general Lemnitzer for his service in the Far East.

Following his return to the United States in August 1957, Van Stockum was ordered to the instruction at Royal Military College of Canada at Fort Frontenac in Kingston, Ontario. He graduated in July 1958 and reported to 2nd Marine Division under Major General Joseph C. Burger as deputy chief of staff. His tour of duty with 2nd Marine Division continued when Van Stockum assumed command of 8th Marine Regiment at the beginning of July 1959.

A new divisional commander, Major General James P. Berkeley, appointed Van Stockum as Divisional Inspector in June 1960. As Division Inspector Van Stockum had the responsibility of scheduling inspections, conducting inspections personally, and accompanying the Commanding general (CG) on his inspections. He also processed disciplinary matters for action by the CG, interviewing personnel who were requesting personal interviews with the CG, etc. Van Stockum had also some difficulties with the commanding officer of the 6th Marines, Colonel Melvin D. Henderson, who sometimes objected to the decisions which Van Stockum conveyed from the CG.

He was appointed Divisional Chief of Staff in February 1961 and was co-responsible for the organization of Operation Old-Timer, social event made for the 20th Birthday of 2nd Marine Division. During this event, Van Stockum met many important leaders from divisional history, retired Generals Franklin A. Hart, Edwin A. Pollock, Lewis B. Puller, Thomas E. Watson, Julian C. Smith or Clayton B. Vogel.

Van Stockum was ordered to Philadelphia in July 1961 and assumed duty as director, 4th Marine Reserve and Recruitment District and had direction over a number of reserve units and recruitment stations in Pennsylvania, Ohio, New Jersey, and Delaware. His duty included also inspection of reserve and recruitment units, and to make calls on governors and other public officials. Following his arrival to his new office in Philadelphia, Van Stockum received word of his nomination to the rank of brigadier general.

=== General's duty ===
He was ordered to the Headquarters Marine Corps in Washington, D.C., on June 5, 1962, and relieved brigadier general William T. Fairbourn as director, Marine Corps Reserve where he had responsibility for all Reserve units and activities for the entire Marine Corps. Van Stockum was promoted to the rank of brigadier general on July 1, 1962. He developed a good relationship with his direct superior, Commandant of the Marine Corps David M. Shoup, and regularly played golf with him.

Van Stockum was transferred to San Diego in March 1964 and appointed commanding general, Landing Force Training Unit, Pacific. It was the same unit which he was assigned to in April 1945. Its purpose remained the same, the training of Army and Marine units in Amphibious Operations. Within this command, Van Stockum toured Western Pacific and inspected his teams, which trained allies of the United States in amphibious warfare. He was invited to Tsoying, Taiwan in October 1964 by Lieutenant General Yu Hao-chang, Commandant of the Chinese (Taiwan) Marine Corps and later visited senior commanders in Hawaii, Tokyo, Yokosuka, Atsugi, and Iwakuni, Japan, Okinawa, South Korea, Hong Kong, Bangkok, Manila.

With the increasing deployment of Marine units to Vietnam, Van Stockum visited III Marine Amphibious Force headquarters under Lieutenant General Lewis W. Walt at Danang and 3rd Marine Division combat bases at Chu Lai and Phu Bai. Van Stockum completed his observation tour in Saigon. He distinguished himself in this capacity and received the Legion of Merit.

Van Stockum was ordered to Okinawa in February 1966 and succeeded his old colleague from 2nd Marine Division, Melvin D. Henderson, as commanding general, Fleet Marine Force, Pacific (Forward) and deputy to Lieutenant General Victor H. Krulak. His main responsibility was coordinating of logistics for the support of the continually growing marine forces committed to the Vietnam War. During his tour of duty on Okinawa, he was visited by Major General John H. Masters, the younger brother of lieutenant general James M. Masters Sr. John Masters, who was a member of the board that selected Van Stockum for Brigadier General, indicated that a few kind words had been said about him at the general officer's conference by James Masters, who knew Van Stockum since the "Minneapolis Incident". Van Stockum was succeeded by Major General John G. Bouker on March 16, 1967, and received his second Legion of Merit for his service with Fleet Marine Force, Pacific.

Upon his return to the United States, Van Stockum was ordered to Headquarters Marine Corps in Washington, D.C., and appointed deputy chief of staff for administration under Chief of Staff, Leonard F. Chapman Jr. He served in this capacity until June 30, 1967, when he completed thirty years of active service and retired from the Marine Corps. However he was recalled to active duty as the Marine Corps Representative on the Navy Department Board of Decorations and Medals and served in this capacity until February 1969. While in this assignment, he attended George Washington University and earned master's degree in college administration.

== Retirement ==
In 1970, Van Stockum settled with his family at Allen Dale Farm in Shelby County, Kentucky, and worked for 11 years as Assistant Dean for Administration at the School of Medicine, and later as Assistant to the University President, at the University of Louisville. He later held numerous positions consecutively within Shelby County: chairman of Louisville Armed Forces Committee; chairman of Military Affairs Committee of the Louisville Area Chamber of Commerce; president of the Shelby County Community Foundation; president of the Filson Club; and as President of the Shelby County Historical Society.

During his tenure with Louisville Armed Forces Committee, Van Stockum hosted President Gerald Ford in May 1976 during President's visit to Louisville. By the early 1990s, Van Stockum had retired to his farm in Shelbyville where he and his sons organized his papers to be donated to The Filson.

General Van Stockum was married to Susanne de Charette Van Stockum (1915–2000) for 51 years. She was a granddaughter of the French General, Baron Athanase-Charles-Marie Charette de la Contrie, Commander of the Papal Zouaves in Rome and hero of the Franco-Prussian War. Through her grandfather she was a direct descendant of King Charles X of France. Van Stockum was the parent of three children: a daughter Michele, and sons Reggie and Charlie.

Van Stockum turned 100 in July 2016, and died in Shelby County, Kentucky, on April 24, 2022, at the age of 105.

== Work ==
He was the author of several historical books and in addition to his books, Van Stockum wrote over 260 historical columns published in the Shelby County, Kentucky's Sentinel-News and numerous other articles in other publications.

His books:

- Kentucky and the Bourbons: The Story of Allen Dale Farm
- Squire Boone and Nicholas Meriwether: Kentucky Pioneers
- Remembrances of World Wars
- Coming to Kentucky: Heaven is a Kentucky of a Place
- My Father: British Sergeant Reginald G. Bareham (1894–1916) and The Battle of the Somme
- La Maison de Charette de la Contrie

== Decorations ==
Here are the decorations of Van Stockum:

1st Row	Legion of Merit with one 5/16" Gold Star		
2nd Row	Bronze Star Medal with Combat "V"	Army Commendation Medal	Navy Unit Commendation
3rd Row	American Defense Service Medal with "A" Device	American Campaign Medal	European–African–Middle Eastern Campaign Medal with one 3/16 inch service star
4th Row	Asiatic-Pacific Campaign Medal with four 3/16 inch service stars	World War II Victory Medal	National Defense Service Medal with one star

Military offices
Preceded by William T. Fairbourn	Director of Marine Corps Reserve; June 5, 1962 – March 3, 1964	Succeeded by Joseph L. Stewart
