= 8th Marine Regiment =

USA Marine Regiment

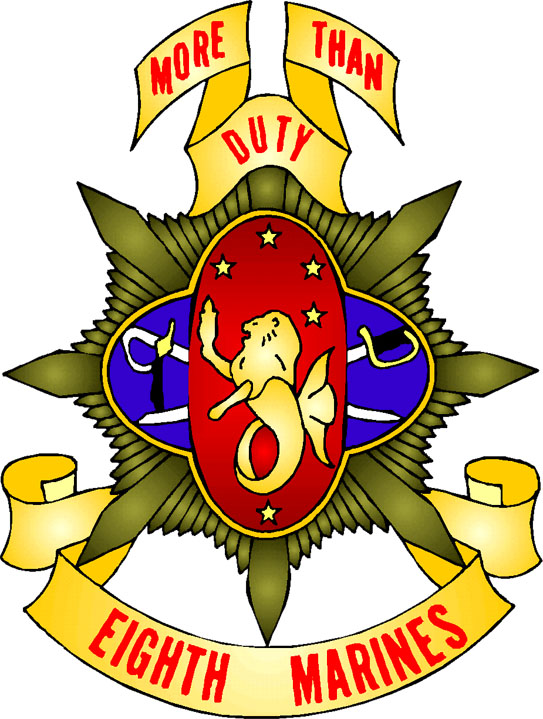
- 8th Marines Insignia
- Active: October 9, 1917 – April 25, 1919; 1920–1925; 1940–1949; 1950 – January 28, 2021
- Country: United States of America
- Branch: United States Marine Corps
- Type: Infantry regiment
- Part of: 2nd Marine Division; II Marine Expeditionary Force
- Garrison/HQ: MCB Camp Lejeune
- Motto: More Than Duty
- Engagements: World War II: Battle of Guadalcanal; Battle of Tarawa; Battle of Saipan; Battle of Tinian; Battle of Okinawa; Multinational Force in Lebanon; Operation Urgent Fury; Operation Desert Storm; War on terror: Operation Iraqi Freedom; Operation Enduring Freedom

Commanders
- Current commander: Colonel John Rochford
- Notable commanders: Eric M. Smith; Henry Louis Larsen; Richard H. Jeschke; Elmer E. Hall; John H. Griebel; Clarence R. Wallace; James M. Masters, Sr. John H. Masters; George D. Webster; Ronald R. Van Stockum; Michael K. Sheridan; Robert B. Johnston

The 8th Marine Regiment was an infantry regiment of the United States Marine Corps. When last active, it was based at Marine Corps Base Camp Lejeune, North Carolina, and fell under the command of the 2nd Marine Division and the II Marine Expeditionary Force. The regiment was decommissioned on January 28, 2021, as a result of ongoing force design efforts.

== Subordinate units ==
The regiment comprises three infantry battalions and one headquarters company:

- Headquarters Company 8th Marines (HQ/8)
- 1st Battalion, 8th Marines (1/8)
- 2nd Battalion, 8th Marines (2/8)
- 3rd Battalion, 8th Marines (3/8)

== History ==
=== Early years ===
The 8th Marine Regiment was formed on 9 October 1917, at Marine Corps Base Quantico, Virginia, during the buildup for World War I. While training for war, the command was transferred to Fort Crockett, Texas, to guard the nearby Mexican oil fields. The regiment was joined there by the 9th Marines to form the 3d Marine Brigade; the first Advance Base Force of World War I. As such, the Marines were held in reserve to establish and defend naval bases in the Atlantic Ocean or the West Indies, if required. The 8th Marines was inactivated at Philadelphia Navy Yard on 25 April 1919.

A year later, the regiment was reactivated for service in Haiti, where Marines had been fighting the Cacos bandits since 1914. Through systematic patrolling which culminated in a number of brief, sharp clashes, the 8th Marines eliminated Haitian banditry that had lasted more than a hundred years. The 8th Marines was inactivated again in 1925.

=== World War II ===
In 1940 the regiment was formed once more, in San Diego, California. It was the first Marine regiment to deploy into the Pacific waters to Samoa. After ten months of jungle training, while defending the Samoan Islands, the regiment sailed to reinforce the engaged 1st Marine Division on Guadalcanal. While there, the 8th Marines won its first Presidential Unit Citation. When the 8th arrived on Guadalcanal they were still wearing the Kelly Transitional helmet according to the book, 'Helmet for My Pillow'.

Joining the 2nd Marine Division in New Zealand, the 8th Marines spent several months refitting for the Battle of Tarawa. In 76 hours the Marines seized that island and opened the door to the Japanese Empire. For its actions, the 8th Marine Regiment received its second Presidential Unit Citation.

After refitting in Hawaii, the 8th Marines sailed for the Marianas, to storm the beaches of Saipan and Tinian, capturing key bases for the air war against Japan. Reinforced with artillery, the regiment later joined the 1st and 6th Divisions in the Battle of Okinawa.

=== Post Vietnam War years ===
In the 1980s; 28 May 1982 2nd Battalion 8th Marines under the command of LtCol. Robert B. Johnson deployed with the 32nd Marine Amphibious Unit (MAU); under the Command of Colonel James M. Mead to the Mediterranean Sea; whereupon the 32nd MAU was ordered to advance to the coast of Lebanon. 15 June 1982 2nd Battalion 8th Marines evacuated the U.S. Ambassador, Staff, and 580 civilian personnel seventy kilometers North of Beirut. 25 August 1982 2nd Battalion 8th Marines along with the French, Italian and Israelis Forces evacuated the Palestine Liberation Organization(PLO) from Beirut. 2nd Battalion 8th Marines left Beirut briefly after the PLO evacuation, but returned as a Multinational Force with the French, Italians, and British in response to the Massacre of 700 to 800 Palestinian refugees. December 1982 3rd Battalion 8th Marines relieved 2nd Battalion 8th Marines on station. 1st Battalion 8th Marines relieved 2nd Battalion 2nd Marines June 1983, and on 23 October 1st Battalion 8th Marines Barracks along with the French 8th Para Regiment Barracks were bombed.2nd Battalion 8th Marines were returning to Beirut, and detoured to the Caribbean when they heard of the Bombing of Marine Barracks. 2nd Battalion 8th Marines invaded Grenada 25 October 1983 as the main force of Operation Urgent Fury, the successful liberation of the Island of Grenada and the rescue of American University students. Immediately after departing Grenada, 2d Battalion, 8th Marines continued their deployment to join the Multinational Peacekeeping Force in Beirut, Lebanon. They were withdrawn from Beirut on 26 February 1984, ending their duties as part of the Multinational Peacekeeping Force and resuming their commitment as the Landing Force Sixth Fleet (LF6F) Battalion Landing Team. In total, 220 marines lost their lives in the bombing of the Beirut barracks alongside 18 sailors and 3 soldiers.

From December 1990 to April 1991 the 8th Marines participated in Operation Desert Shield and Operation Desert Storm in Saudi Arabia and Kuwait. 2d Battalion, 8th Marines participated in Operation Provide Comfort in northern Iraq from April to July 1991.

=== Global war on terrorism ===
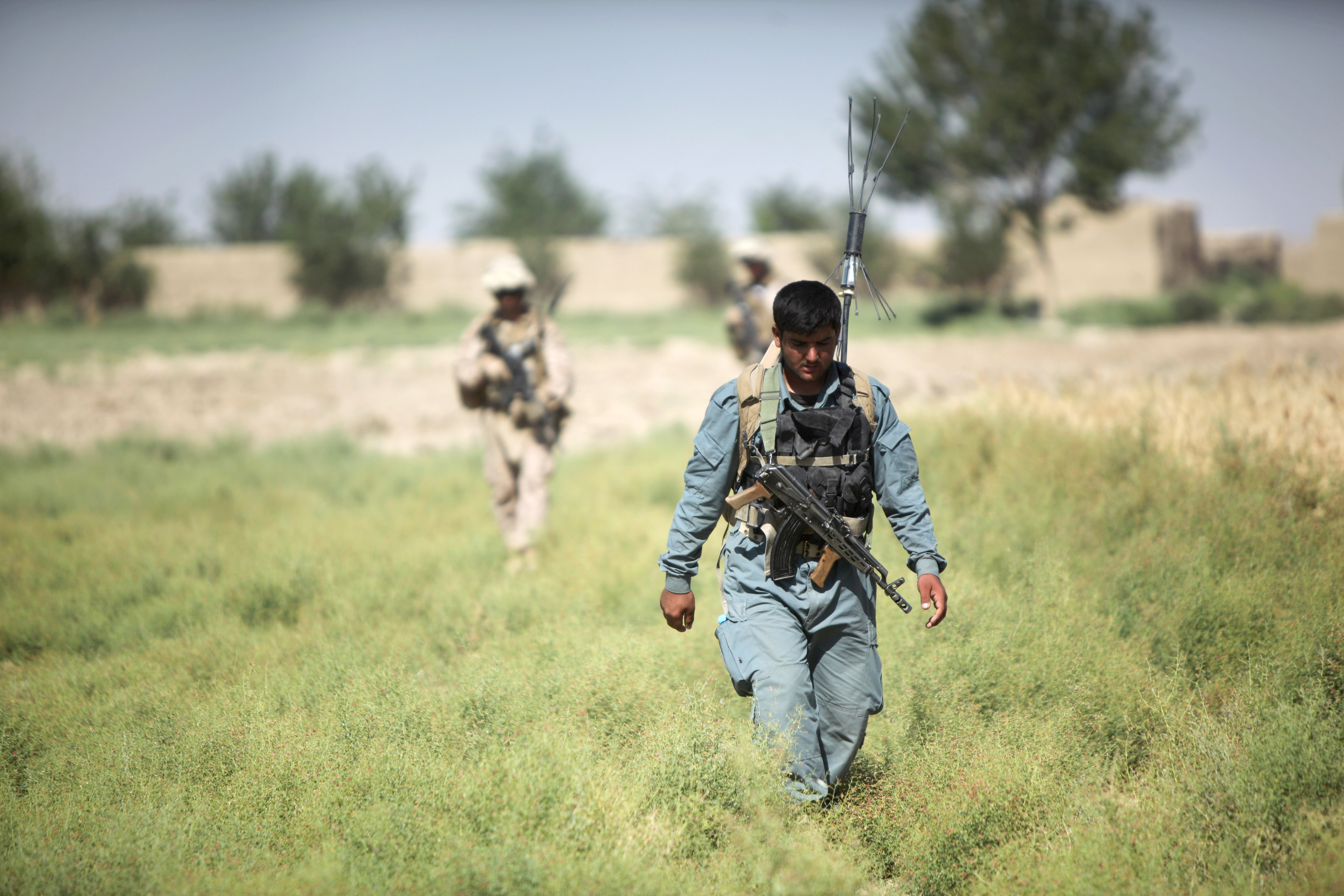
Kilo Company, 3rd Battalion, 8th Marine Regiment, partnered with Afghan National Police, patrol through Garmsir District, Helmand province, Afghanistan, 1 June 2012

8th Marines deployed in support of Operation Iraqi Freedom in the February 2005. They operated around the city of Fallujah, Iraq. The Marines secured the city ahead of the December 2005 national elections.

8th Marines redeployed to Iraq in January 2009, taking over responsibility for the western Al-Anbar province from the 5th Marines. During this period, RCT-8 continued and completed the major retrograde of equipment out of Iraq, and also continued civil affairs operations to stabilize the Area of Operation. Due to the drawdown of forces throughout the country, RCT-8's deployment was cut short and they were ordered to redeploy home in September 2009, instead of their original departure date of January 2010. According to CBS News, the regiment had one of the highest casualty rates during its 2009 deployment.

On 7 January 2011, the Department of Defense officially announced that RCT-8 would be deploying in early 2011 to Afghanistan for approximately one year in support of Operation Enduring Freedom.

=== Deactivation ===
8th Marine Regiment was deactivated in January 2021 as part of a restructuring of the Corps. 1st Battalion 8th Marines however, as the battalion within 8th Marines that had taken the most casualties across its existence, was kept active and reassigned to the 6th Marine Regiment, deploying later that year for the evacuation of Americans and allies from Kabul, Operation Allies Refuge.

== Notable members ==
- Don Adams, Guadalcanal campaign
- Dale Dye, 1982–83 in Lebanon

== See also ==
- List of United States Marine Corps regiments
- Organization of the United States Marine Corps

== Bibliography ==
- This article incorporates public domain material from websites or documents of the United States Marine Corps.
- Rottman, Gordon L., "U.S. Marine Corps World War II Order of Battle: Ground and Air Units in the Pacific War, 1939–1945". Westport, Conn: Greenwood Press. 2002.
- Santelli, James S. (1976). Marine Corps Historical Division (ed.). A Brief History of the 8th Marines. Washington D.C.: United States Marine Corps. PCN 19000318000.
