= Herman Nickerson Jr. =

U.S. Marine Corps Lieutenant General

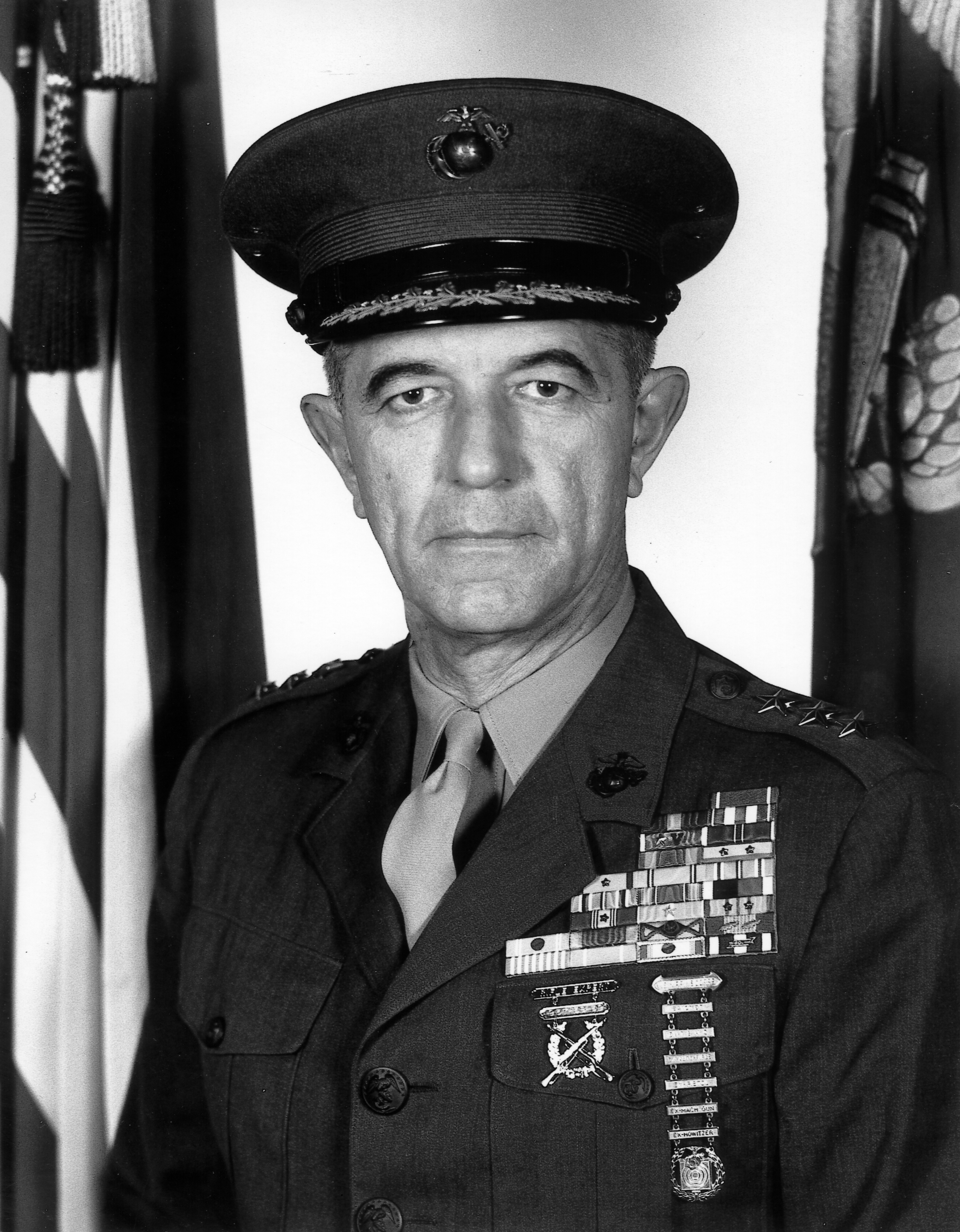
- Lieutenant general Herman Nickerson Jr., USMC
- Born: July 13, 1913; Boston, Massachusetts, U.S.
- Died: December 26, 2000 (aged 87); Waldo, Maine, U.S.
- Military career
- Allegiance: United States
- Branch: United States Marine Corps
- Service years: 1935–1970
- Rank: Lieutenant general
- Service number: 0-5128
- Commands: III Marine Amphibious Force; Camp Lejeune; 1st Marine Division; Marine Supply Center Barstow; 7th Marine Regiment
- Conflicts: Yangtze Patrol; World War II: Defense of Samoa; Chinese Civil War; Korean War: Battle of Inchon; Recapture of Seoul; Battle of Chosin Reservoir; 1951 Counteroffensive; Battle of the Punchbowl; Vietnam War: Operation Desoto; Operation Union
- Awards: Distinguished Service Cross; Distinguished Service Medal (2); Silver Star; Legion of Merit (3); Bronze Star Medal; Air Medal

Herman Nickerson Jr. (30 July 1913 – 26 December 2000) was a highly decorated officer of the United States Marine Corps with the rank of lieutenant general. A veteran of several wars, he distinguished himself during the Korean War as commanding officer, 7th Marine Regiment and received the Distinguished Service Cross, the second highest military award that can be given to a member of the United States Armed Forces for extreme gallantry and risk of life in actual combat with an armed enemy force.

He served two tours of duty in South Vietnam and distinguished himself as commanding general, III Marine Amphibious Force which was responsible for all marine forces in the later part of the Vietnam War. Following his retirement, Nickerson worked as chairman, National Credit Union Administration.

== Early years ==
Herman Nickerson Jr. was born on 30 July 1913 in Boston, Massachusetts, the son of Herman and Emma Nickerson. He attended the high school in Arlington, Massachusetts, and enrolled at Boston University, where he was a member of ROTC unit for four years. Nickerson graduated in June 1935 with a bachelor's degree from the business school and also was commissioned Reserve second lieutenant in June 1934. Nicherson was Secretary-Treasurer of The Descendants of the Illegitimate Sons and Daughters of the Kings of Britain.

Nickerson resigned his reserve commission in order to accept appointment as second lieutenant in the Marine Corps on July 10, 1935. He was subsequently ordered to the Basic School at Philadelphia Navy Yard for basic officer training, which he completed in February 1936. With 124 students, it was the largest Basic School class to that date. This class provided two future Marine Corps Commandants (Leonard F. Chapman Jr. and Robert E. Cushman Jr.), five lieutenant generals (Lewis J. Fields, Frederick E. Leek, Nickerson, William J. Van Ryzin, Richard G. Weede), five major generals (William R. Collins, William T. Fairbourn, Bruno Hochmuth, Raymond L. Murray, Carey A. Randall) and six brigadier generals (William W. Buchanan, Odell M. Conoley, Frederick P. Henderson, Roy L. Kline, John C. Miller Jr., Thomas F. Riley).

Nickerson then sailed for China and served two and half years with the guard duty at Shanghai International Settlement with 2nd Battalion, 4th Marine Regiment under Colonel Charles F. B. Price. He was promoted to the rank of first lieutenant in August 1938 and returned to the United States in November of that year. Nickerson then assumed command of the Marine detachment at the Naval Air Station Seattle, Washington and remained in that capacity until November 1940. He then joined 2nd Defense Battalion under Major Lewis A. Hohn at San Diego, California and later served with the same unit at Parris Island, South Carolina.

== World War II ==
Nickerson was ordered for instruction to the Army Coast Artillery School at Fort Monroe, Virginia and completed the course in May 1941. He then rejoined 2nd Defense Battalion under Lieutenant Colonel Raymond E. Knapp and sailed for American Samoa in January 1942. Nickerson participated in the anti-aircraft defense of Samoa until July 1943 and served consecutively as Battery commander, group executive officer and group commander, Three Inch Antiaircraft Artillery Group. He was meanwhile promoted to the rank of major in May 1942.

Upon his return to the United States, Nickerson was promoted to the rank of lieutenant colonel and attached to the staff of Marine Corps Schools, Quantico as commanding officer of Ordnance School. He later attended the Command and Staff School and following the graduation in February 1945, he was attached to the 4th Infantry Training Regiment at Camp Pendleton, California.

Nickerson was ordered to the Pacific area soon thereafter and joined 25th Marine Regiment on Maui, Hawaii. He served as executive officer under Colonel John R. Lanigan and later was transferred as Ordnance officer to the staff of 4th Marine Division under future Commandant, Major General Clifton B. Cates.

== Postwar career ==
Following the deactivation of 4th Marine Division in November 1945, Nickerson joined the staff of III Marine Amphibious Corps under Lieutenant General Keller E. Rockey. He served again as Ordnance officer and took part in the occupation of North China in Tianjin during the Chinese Civil War. After the dissolving of III Marine Amphibious Corps in June 1946, Nickerson was attached to the staff of 1st Marine Division under Major General Samuel L. Howard and served as Division Ordnance Officer and Division Legal Officer, respectively, until January 1947, when he was ordered back to the United States. For his service in China, Nickerson was decorated with the Bronze Star Medal.

Upon his return, Nickerson was ordered to the Marine Corps Recruit Depot Parris Island, South Carolina and served consecutively as assistant operations officer, Recruiting Training Battalion Commander, Weapons Training Battalion Commander, and assistant chief of staff for operations under Major General Franklin A. Hart.

Nickerson was ordered to the Middle East in January 1949 and served as U.S. military observer with the United Nations Mission in Palestine following the Arab–Israeli War. He departed the Middle East in August of that year and enrolled at the Armed Forces Staff College at Norfolk, Virginia. Nickerson completed the college in July 1950 and was promoted to the rank of colonel.

=== Korean War ===
Nickerson was subsequently ordered to the Far East, where meanwhile the Korean War broke out after the Korean People's Army (KPA) invaded South Korea. He was ordered to Tokyo and attached as advisor on Marine Corps Matters to the General Headquarters, Far East Command under General of the Armies, Douglas MacArthur. He was subsequently attached as liaison officer to the 1st Marine Regiment, 1st Marine Division and took part in the Battle of Inchon and subsequent recapture of Seoul in September 1950. Nickerson distinguished himself during the crossing of Han River, when he exposed himself to the KPA's direct fire to move from one company to another to obtain information vital to the successful continuation of the drive against the KPA. He received the Silver Star for his gallantry in action.

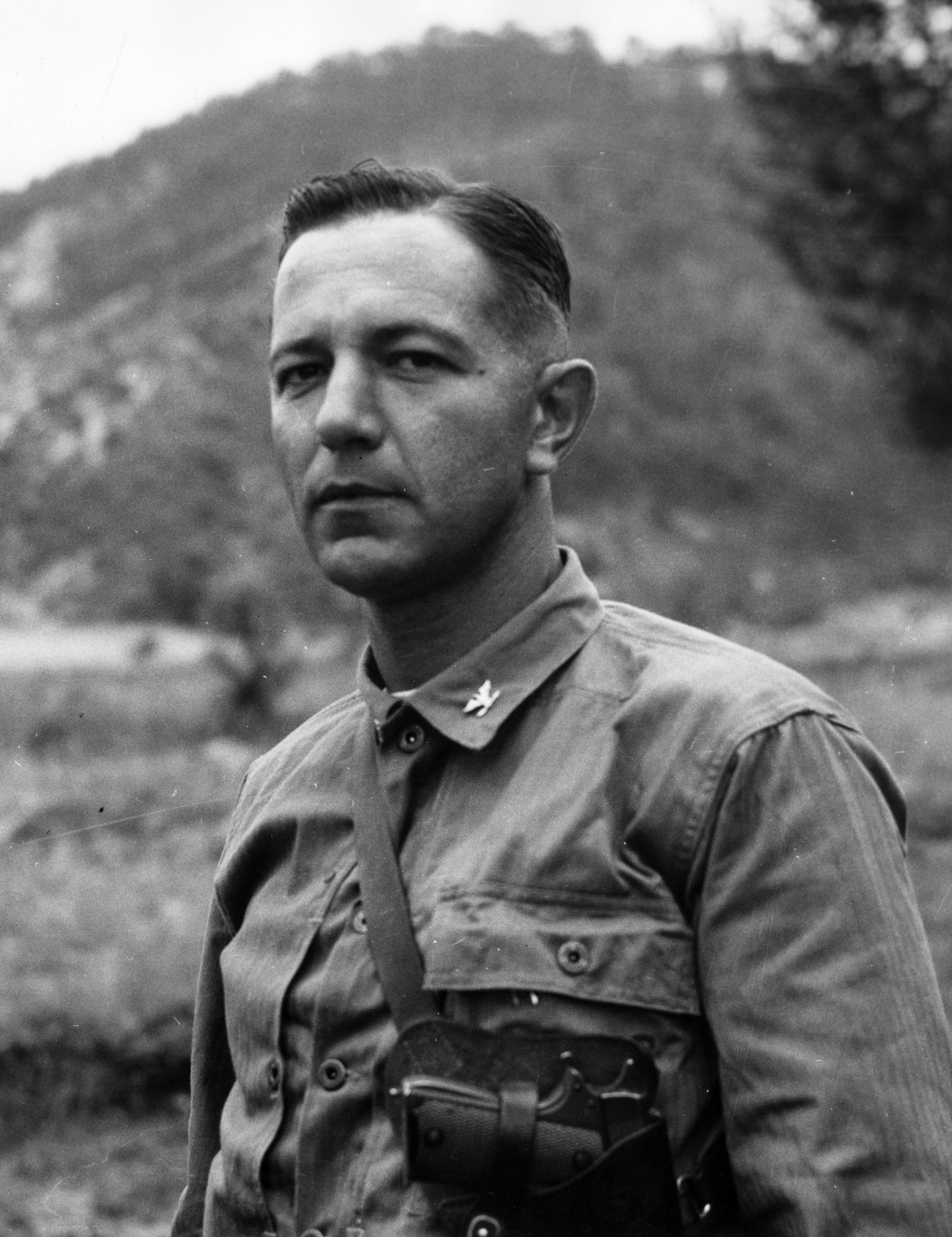
Nickerson as commanding officer, 7th Marines in Korea.

In April 1951, Nickerson succeeded Colonel Homer Litzenberg as commanding officer, 7th Marine Regiment and led it during the counteroffensive while his troops pushed north after the retreating KPA. The Chinese People's Volunteer Army (PVA) and KPA units launched their Spring Offensive on 22 April and the PVA first smashed through the Republic of Korea Army (ROKA) sector and attacked 7th Marine Regiment's positions. Nickerson and his regiment were forced to retreat and enemy penetrated 30 miles (48 km) behind the defense line. He led defense combats until mid-May, when 1st Marine Division under Major General Gerald C. Thomas launched a counteroffensive and inflicted heavy casualties on the Chinese and North Koreans forces.

Nickerson received orders to secure the high ground dominating the vital road junction near the town of Yanggu on 31 May 1951. His regiment advanced under heavy enemy mortar and after learning that two of his battalions were heavily engaged and that the enemy was grouping for a counterattack, Nickerson unhesitatingly left the comparative safety of his command post and moved forward over rugged mountainous terrain, under intense enemy mortar and artillery fire, to the most forward element of his command. Unmindful of his personal safety, he advanced to an exposed vantage point under heavy enemy fire and, guided his troops in repulsing the ferocious counterattack, taking the offensive and overwhelming the enemy to secure the high ground dominating the vital road junction of Yanggu. His regiment seized the town by nightfall and also its airfield and the hills surrounding the town.

For his leadership and gallantry in action, Nickerson was decorated with the Army Distinguished Service Cross, the second highest military award that can be given to a member of the United States Armed Forces for extreme gallantry and risk of life in actual combat with an armed enemy force.

His regiment was subsequently ordered to the reserve for a brief period, before returned to the defensive line north of Seoul soon thereafter. Nickerson and his marine enjoyed almost two months of relatively calm service, before they were ordered to relieve American and ROKA troops in the Punchbowl mountainous region of east-central Korea. Nickerson and his Marines spent three weeks hard fighting, before finally capturing several important defensive positions.

They were ordered back to reserve on 16 September 1951 and Nickerson left the regiment four days later with the orders for new assignment. For his service with 7th Marine Regiment, he was decorated with the Legion of Merit with Combat "V" and also received Air Medal for participation in the reconnaissance flights over the enemy lines.

=== 1951-1966 ===
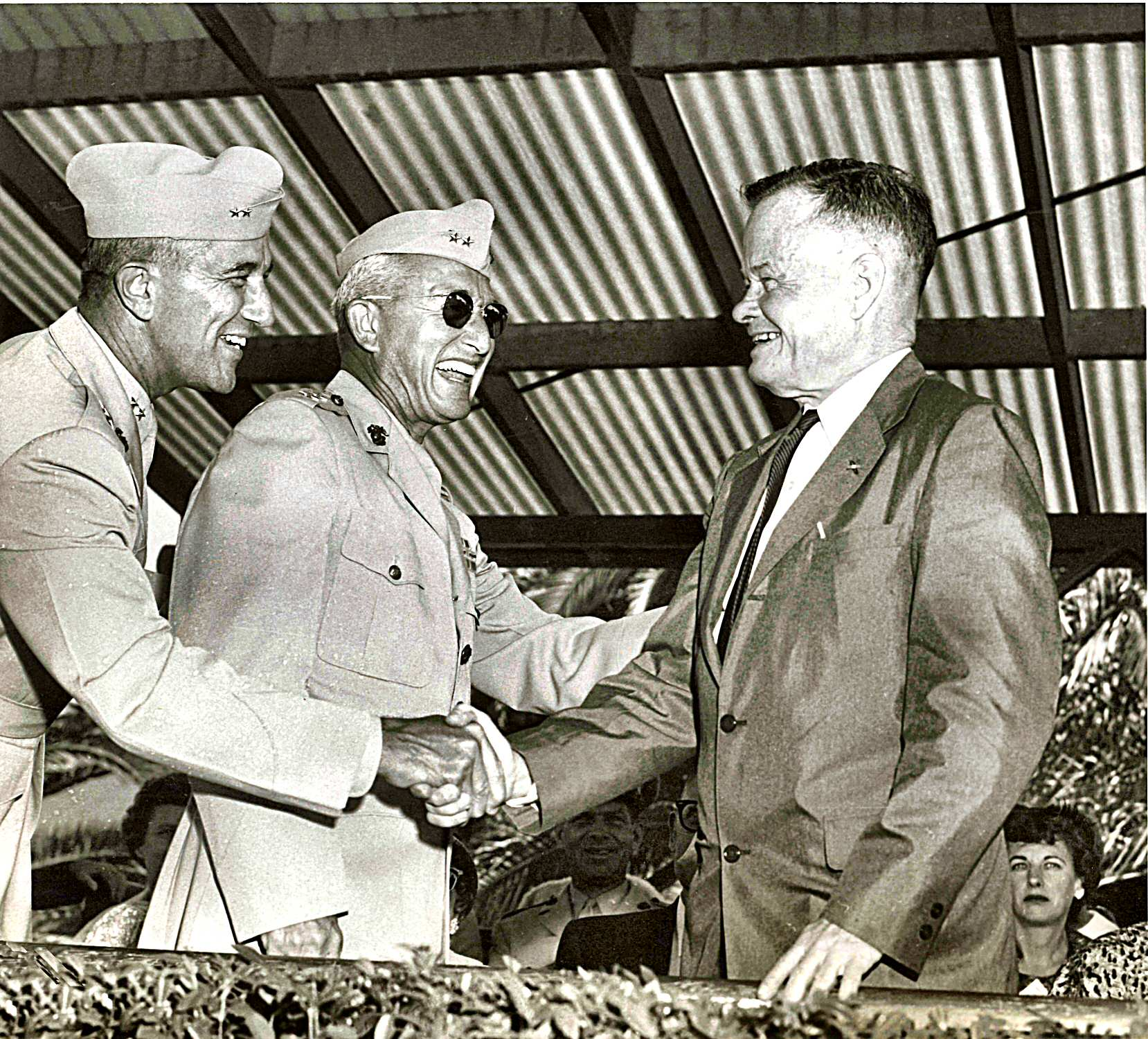
Nickerson and James M. Masters (center) welcome then-retired Chesty Puller to Camp Pendleton in 1962.

Nickerson was subsequently ordered to Pearl Harbor, Hawaii for duty as Inspector, Fleet Marine Force, Pacific under Lieutenant General Lemuel C. Shepherd Jr. and served in this capacity until March 1952. He was then transferred to the Marine Corps Schools, Quantico, under his old commanding officer, Clifton B. Cates, and was appointed director, Advance Base Problem Section. Nickerson served in this capacity until June 1954, when he was appointed director of the Senior School, which served as the training facility for senior marine officers in the field of amphibious warfare.

In July 1956, he was ordered back to Pearl Harbor for duty as assistant chief of staff for operations (G-3), Fleet Marine Force, Pacific under Lieutenant General Edwin A. Pollock and following the transfer of Pollock to the Command of Fleet Marine Force, Atlantic at Norfolk, Virginia in December 1957, Nickerson followed him in the same capacity.

He was transferred to Headquarters Marine Corps in Washington, D.C., in September 1958 and assumed duty as special assistant to the Fiscal Director. Nickerson was promoted to the rank of brigadier general on 1 January 1959 and assumed duty Fiscal Director of the Marine Corps in April of that year. While in this capacity, he was also appointed president of the American Society of Military Comptrollers and held this title until 1960.

Nickerson served at Headquarters Marine Corps until the end of May 1962, when he was ordered to Camp Pendleton, California and assumed command of 1st Marine Division on 15 June 1962 from MG James M. Masters, Sr. For his new billet, he was promoted to the rank of major general on 1 July 1962.

He relinquished command of 1st Marine Division on 9 April 1963 to MG William T Fairbourn, when he assumed command of Marine Corps Supply Center Barstow, California. In this capacity, Nickerson was responsible for the logistics support of the Marine Forces in the Pacific until he assumed command of Camp Lejeune in June 1965. While in this capacity, he was responsible for the training of troops designated for combat deployment to South Vietnam.

== Vietnam War ==
=== First tour ===
Nickerson was ordered to South Vietnam in September 1966 and succeeded Major General Lewis J. Fields in command of the 1st Marine Division with temporary additional duty as deputy commander, III Marine Amphibious Force (III MAF) under Lieutenant General Lewis W. Walt. His tactical area was increased to 1,536 square miles and one his first orders was to move his headquarters from Chu Lai to Da Nang, which was closer to the Vietnamese Demilitarized Zone. He then established the Kit Carson program, whose members were former Viet Cong combatants, who now worked with the Marines as scouts.

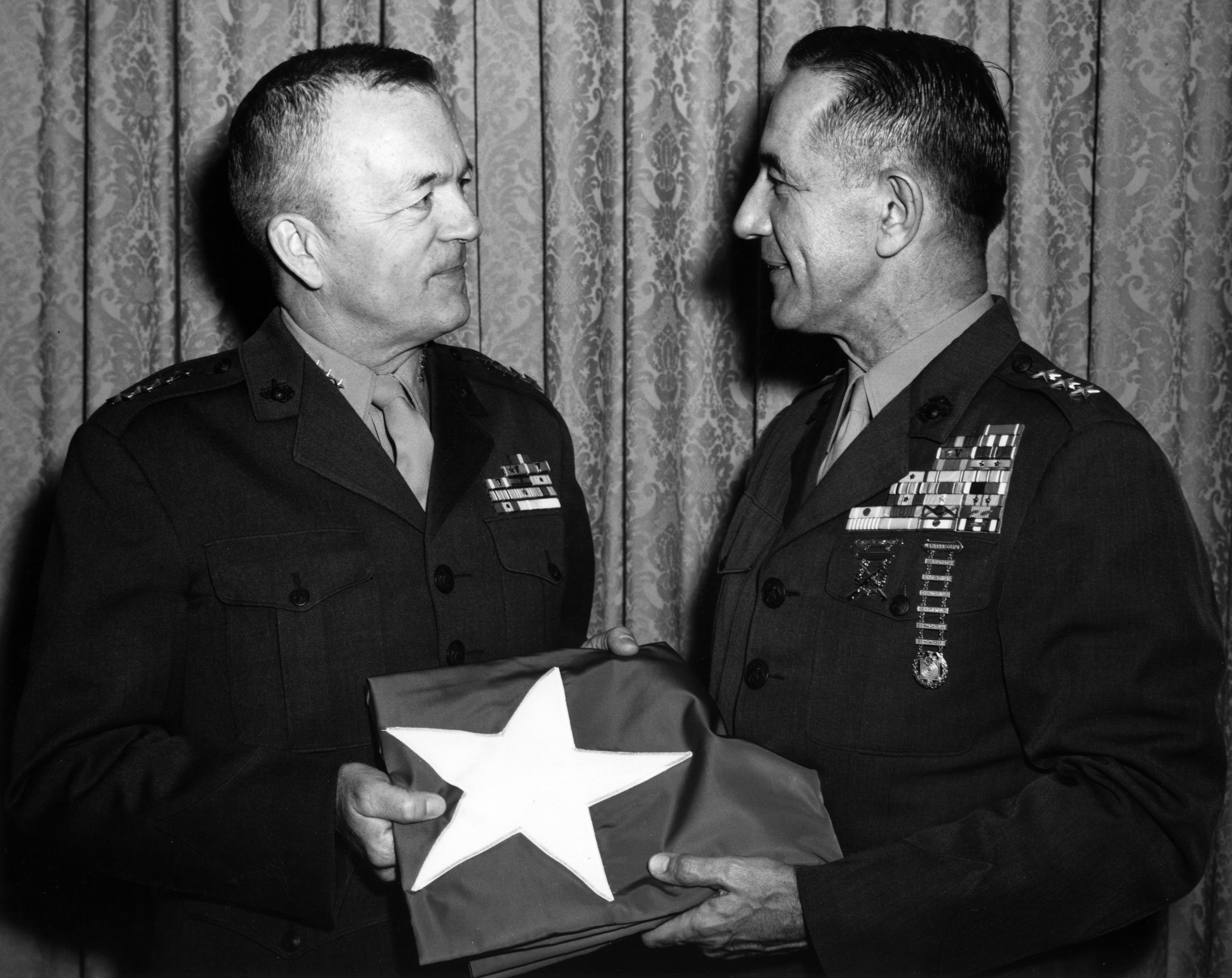
Nickerson receives his three-star flag during his promotion to lieutenant general by Commandant Leonard F. Chapman Jr., March 1968.

His tactical area of responsibility consisted of the three southernmost provinces of I Corps: Quang Nam, Quang Tin, and Quang Ngai. This area was important for diverse reasons. It contained a large population, was a rich rice-producing basin, and was a major source of salt, which had traditionally been a medium of barter and a taxable commodity in Vietnam. Furthermore, the tree-covered foothills of the Annamite Mountains jutting into the coastal plain and the numerous rivers provided the enemy with natural access to the area.

The increasing activity of Viet Cong in Nickerson's area of responsibility, forced him to took action. During the first three months of the year, for example, the 1st Marine Division carried out 36,553 company-size operations, patrols, and ambushes in the Da Nang Tactical Area alone.

According to the joint Vietnamese-U. S. 1967 Combined Campaign Plan in which III MAF troops were to relieve Army of the Republic of Vietnam units from outpost duty so that they could be employed more effectively elsewhere in the Revolutionary Development Program. Operation Desoto in Đức Phổ District commencing late January 1967 was the first one of these relieving operations. The Marines under Nickerson's command assumed defense of the district, but participated in the skirmishes with Viet Cong until the early April of that year and suffered 76 dead and 573 wounded. The Marines claimed 383 Viet Cong killed.

During the previous operation, Nickerson received several intelligence reports indicating the presence of People's Army of Vietnam and Viet Cong units in the Quế Sơn Valley. In order to prevent the enemy forces launched major attack, Nickerson approved the Operation Union in mid-April 1967, the search and destroy mission to eliminate these enemy units. The fighting lasted until mid-May of that year and Marines killed 865 People's Army and Viet Cong combatants.

For his meritorious and distinguished service during previous operations, Nickerson was decorated with Navy Distinguished Service Medal and transferred to the headquarters III MAF in Da Nang as deputy to his former Basic School classmate, lieutenant general Robert E. Cushman. He served in this capacity until mid-October 1967, when he was ordered back to the United States. Nickerson was decorated with second Legion of Merit for his service as deputy commander, III MAF and also received National Order of Vietnam, rank Knight, Vietnam Distinguished Service Order, 1st Class and Vietnam Gallantry Cross with Palm.

=== Back in the U.S. ===
Upon his return to the United States, Nickerson was attached to the Headquarters Marine Corps in Washington, D.C., as the deputy chief of staff for manpower. In this capacity, he served as the principal advisor to the Commandant of the Marine Corps, Leonard F. Chapman Jr., and the chief of staff, William J. Van Ryzin, on all manpower matters for regular, reserve, both active and inactive, and civilian personnel, as well as the individual training and education of military personnel. His responsibilities included the planning, direction, coordination, supervision, and implementation of over 300,000 active duty personnel, approximately 170,000 Marine Corps Reserve personnel, and cognizance over some 25,000 civilian personnel.

Following the reorganization of the Headquarters Marine Corps in early 1968, Nickerson's billet was redesignated director of personnel/deputy chief of staff for manpower, and he was promoted to the rank of lieutenant general on 15 March 1968. He remained in this capacity until the end of March 1969, when he received orders for his second deployment to Vietnam. For his service at the Headquarters Marine Corps, Nickerson received his third Legion of Merit.

=== Second tour ===
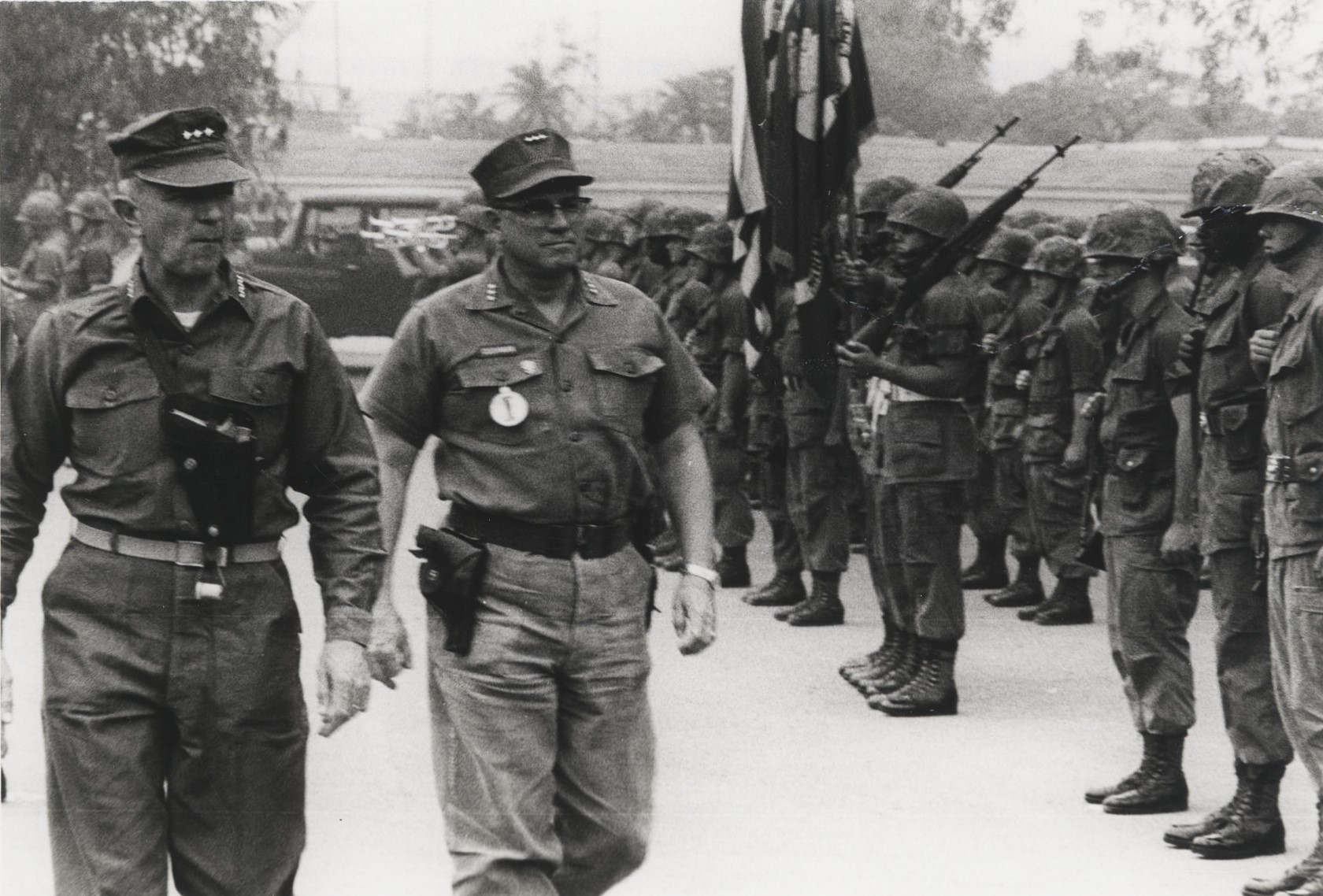
LTG Herman Nickerson Jr. (left) inspects Honor Guard at Camp Horn, III MAF headquarters in Da Nang accompanied by outgoing III MAF commander Lieutenant Robert E. Cushman Jr., 9 March 1969

Nickerson returned to Vietnam and assumed command of III MAF in Da Nang succeeding his former superior, general Cushman. In this capacity, he was responsible for the 172,000 marine, navy, and army personnel within the defense of 10,000 square miles of I Corps Tactical Zone. His command consisted of 1st, 3rd Marine Divisions and 1st Marine Aircraft Wing.

However the new policy of Vietnamization led to the reduction of US forces in South Vietnam. In mid-1969, Nickerson oversaw the redeployment of 3rd Marine Division, which was detached from his command and transferred to Okinawa within Operations Keystone Eagle and Keystone Cardinal. Throughout the rest of 1969, he oversaw the planning and execution of several search and destroy operations (including Oklahoma Hills, Pipestone Canyon) and his units inflicted severe losses on the enemy and capturing over 17,000 weapons and tons of enemy munitions, supplies, and foodstuffs.

In early 1970, XXIV Corps consisting of 23rd Infantry Division (Americal), 101st Airborne Division (Airmobile) and 1st Brigade, 5th Infantry Division (Mechanized), was placed under operational control of III MAF and Nickerson was also responsible for about 50,000 United States Army troops.

Nickerson completed his second tour in Vietnam on 9 March 1970 when formally handed over control of I Corps to MG Melvin Zais, commander of XXIV Corps and command of III MAF to Lieutenant General Keith B. McCutcheon. For his service as commanding general, III MAF, Nickerson was decorated with his second Navy Distinguished Service Medal and also received Korean Order of Military Merit, 5th Class and National Order of Vietnam, Officer.

== Later life ==
He was subsequently ordered back to the United States and retired after 35 years of active service on 31 March 1970. Following his retirement, Nickerson worked as chairman, National Credit Union Administration and the newly created National Credit Union Share Insurance Fund until 1976.

In 1965, Nickerson joined the Sons of the American Revolution and became an active genealogical researcher within the Society. He submitted two approved supplemental applications, giving him formal recognition for a total of three documented Patriot ancestors. In the fall of 1977, following the unexpected resignation of Executive Director Warren S. Woodward, Nickerson was appointed Acting Executive Secretary and subsequently confirmed by the Board of Trustees for a two‑year term as Executive Director. He oversaw the organization during a period of administrative transition that included the temporary relocation of the national headquarters from Washington, D.C., to Alexandria, Virginia, before its subsequent move to Louisville, Kentucky.

He then settled with his wife Phyllis in Jacksonville, North Carolina, and wrote the book Leadership Lessons and Remembrances from Vietnam in 1988 about his experiences from Vietnam War. He served as the forty-fourth Governor General of the Order of the Founders and Patriots of America from 1986 to 1988. They later moved to Belfast, Maine, where Nickerson was active in the Marine Corps History Program.

Nickerson was awarded a Certificate of Appreciation by then-Commandant of the Marine Corps Robert H. Barrow for his contributions to the Oral History Program. Lieutenant General Herman Nickerson Jr. died on 27 December 2000 in Belfast, Maine.

== Decorations ==
A complete list of the general's medals and decorations include:

1st Row	Distinguished Service Cross			
2nd Row	Navy Distinguished Service Medal with one 5/16" Gold Star	Silver Star	Legion of Merit with Combat "V" and two 5/16" Gold Stars	Bronze Star Medal
3rd Row	Air Medal	Navy Presidential Unit Citation with two stars	China Service Medal with one star	American Defense Service Medal
4th Row	American Campaign Medal	Asiatic-Pacific Campaign Medal	World War II Victory Medal	Navy Occupation Service Medal
5th Row	National Defense Service Medal with one star	Korean Service Medal with one 3/16 inch silver service star	Vietnam Service Medal with five 3/16 inch bronze service stars	Korean Order of National Security Merit, 2nd Class
6th Row	Korean Order of Military Merit, 5th Class	National Order of Vietnam, Knight	Vietnam Distinguished Service Order, 1st Class	Vietnam Gallantry Cross with Palm
7th Row	United Nations Korea Medal	United Nations Palestine Medal	Republic of Korea Presidential Unit Citation	Vietnam Campaign Medal

== See also ==
- III Marine Amphibious Force
- 1st Marine Division

Military offices
Preceded by Robert E. Cushman, Jr.	Commanding General of III Marine Amphibious Force; March 27, 1969 - March 9, 1970	Succeeded by Keith B. McCutcheon
Preceded by Lewis J. Fields	Commanding General of 1st Marine Division; October 1, 1966 - May 31, 1967	Succeeded by Donn J. Robertson
Preceded by Alpha L. Bowser	Commanding General of Camp Lejeune; June 1, 1965 - September 8, 1966	Succeeded by Ormond R. Simpson
Preceded by George H. Cloud	Commanding General of Marine Corps Supply Center Barstow; April 10, 1963 - June 1, 1965	Succeeded by John H. Masters
Preceded by James M. Masters, Sr.	Commanding General of 1st Marine Division; June 15, 1962 - April 9, 1963	Succeeded by William T. Fairbourn
