= John H. Masters =

U.S. Marine Corps Major General

John Hillary Masters
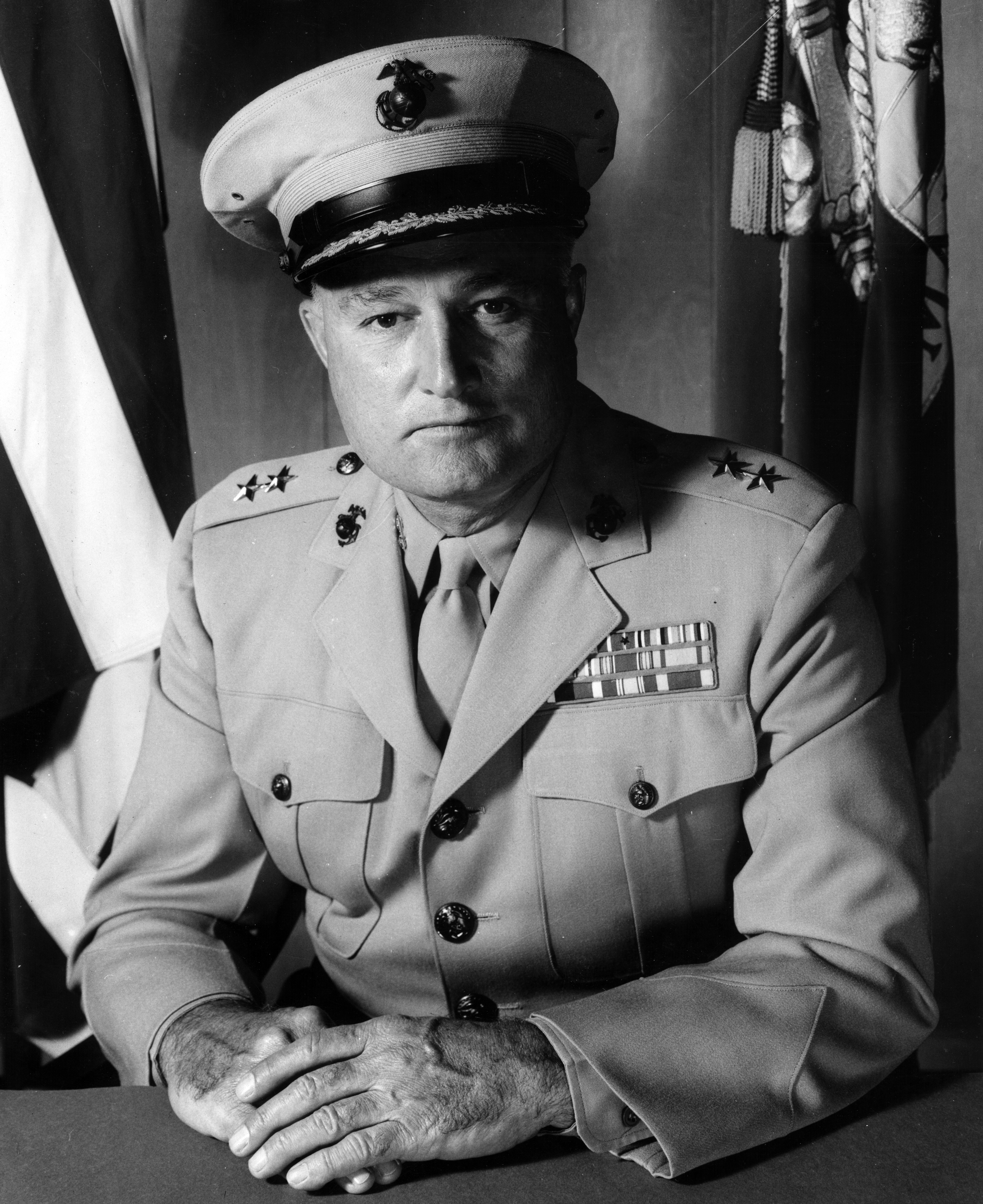
- MG John H. Masters, USMC
- Born: May 23, 1913; Atlanta, Georgia, U.S.A.
- Died: October 22, 1987 (aged 74); Mount Pleasant, South Carolina, U.S.A.
- Relatives: LTG James M. Masters Sr.
- Military career
- Allegiance: United States
- Branch: United States Marine Corps
- Service years: 1936–1969
- Rank: Major general
- Nickname: "Bud"
- Service number: 0-5286
- Commands: Marine Supply Center Barstow; 4th Marine Regiment; 8th Marine Regiment; 1st Battalion, 5th Marines
- Conflicts: World War II: Arctic convoys; China Defensive campaign; Chinese Civil War
- Awards: Legion of Merit (2)

John Hillary Masters (May 23, 1913 – October 22, 1987) was an American major general in the United States Marine Corps. He spent most of his senior career in the Quartermaster Department and retired in July 1969 as deputy chief of staff to the commander in chief, Atlantic Fleet. His older brother was Lieutenant General James M. Masters Sr.

== Early years ==
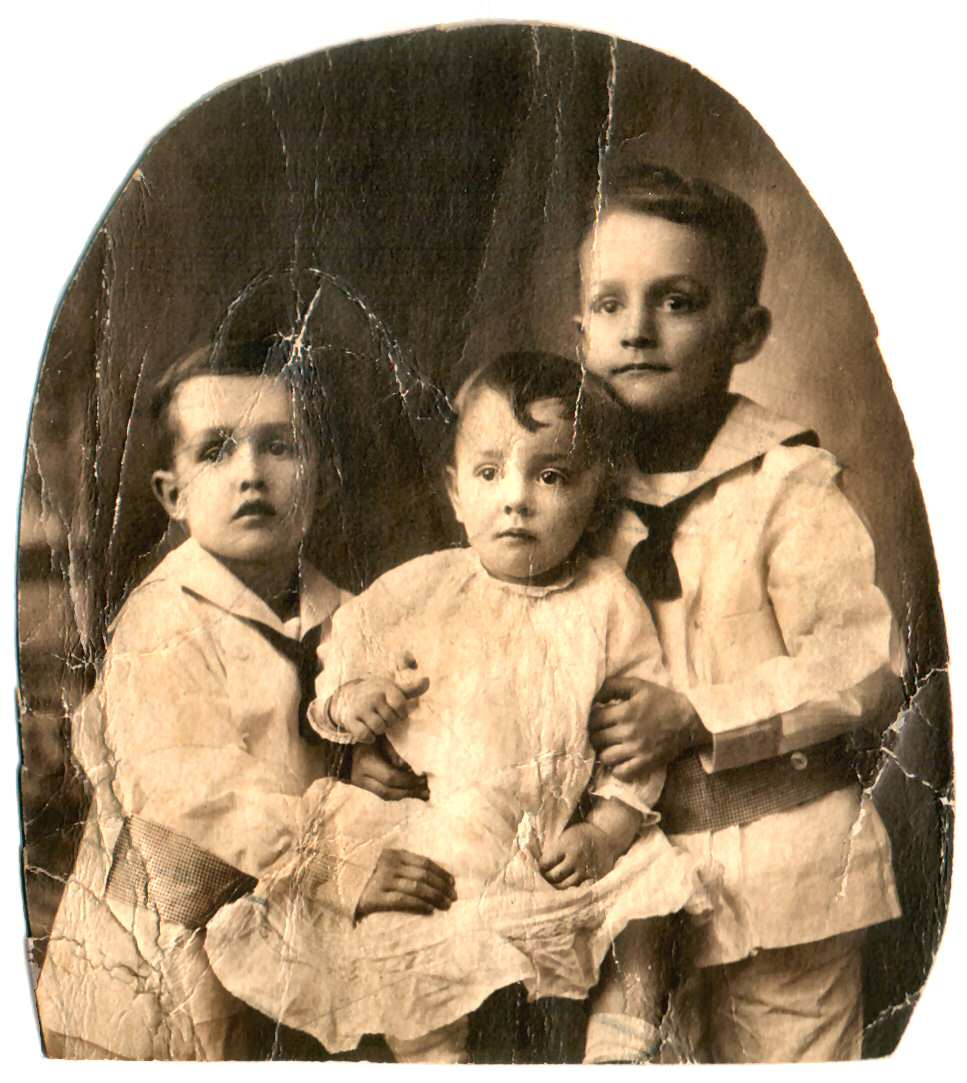
The Masters brothers: James (right), John (left), and William (center)

John H. Masters was born on May 23, 1913, in Atlanta, Georgia, as the son of James M. Masters and his wife Cecilia Hale. When he was 12 years old, his grandfather (a one-time Confederate soldier in the 15th South Carolina Infantry Regiment died, and his family moved to the grandfather's farm in Anderson, South Carolina. John had two brothers: James and William. His older brother James also served in the Marines and reached the rank of lieutenant general.

Young John attended high school there in 1930 and subsequently entered the Citadel in Charleston, South Carolina. However he left two years later in order to accept appointment to the United States Naval Academy at Annapolis, Maryland. During his years at the academy, Masters was active in wrestling club and was in the same class as future marine generals Louis Robertshaw and Paul R. Tyler and Rear Admiral Chester Nimitz Jr. He earned the nickname "Bud".

Masters graduated on June 4, 1936, with bachelor's degree and was commissioned second lieutenant on the same date. He was subsequently ordered to the Basic School at Philadelphia Navy Yard for basic officer training, which he completed in June of the following year. While at the basic school, Bud Masters had the opportunity to meet Chesty Puller, who served as his instructor.

Upon completion of the school, he was attached to the 1st Battalion, 5th Marine Regiment, 1st Marine Brigade under Brigadier General Richard P. Williams at Quantico, Virginia. Masters served as platoon leader in the machine gun company and later as officer in charge of the special weapons and anti-tank platoons. He also took part in maneuvers in the Caribbean and reached the rank of first lieutenant in June 1939.

== World War II ==
Masters was subsequently ordered back to the Marine Corps Base Quantico and appointed Aide-de-Camp to the commanding general, James C. Breckinridge. He continued in that capacity under Louis M. Little until May 1940, when assumed duties as commanding officer of Marine detachment aboard the cruiser USS Tuscaloosa (CA-37) and took part in Neutrality patrols in the Caribbean and Bermuda.

Following the Japanese attack on Pearl Harbor, Masters was promoted to the rank of captain in January 1942 and participated in the Russian convoy operations with British Home Fleet in the Norwegian Sea. Upon his promotion to major in September 1942, Masters was detached from Tuscaloosa and ordered to China, where he was appointed Commander of U.S. Naval Unit One, U.S. Naval Group China under Rear Admiral Milton E. Miles. Within this assignment, he was tasked with the training of Kuomintang guerrillas and was promoted to the rank of lieutenant colonel in January 1944.

He was transferred back to the United States in June 1944 and assumed duties at Headquarters Marine Corps in Washington, D.C., as aide-de-camp to the Commandant of the Marine Corps, Alexander Vandegrift. In this capacity, he was responsible for the coordination of the general's personal attendants such as drivers or orderlies.

== Postwar career ==
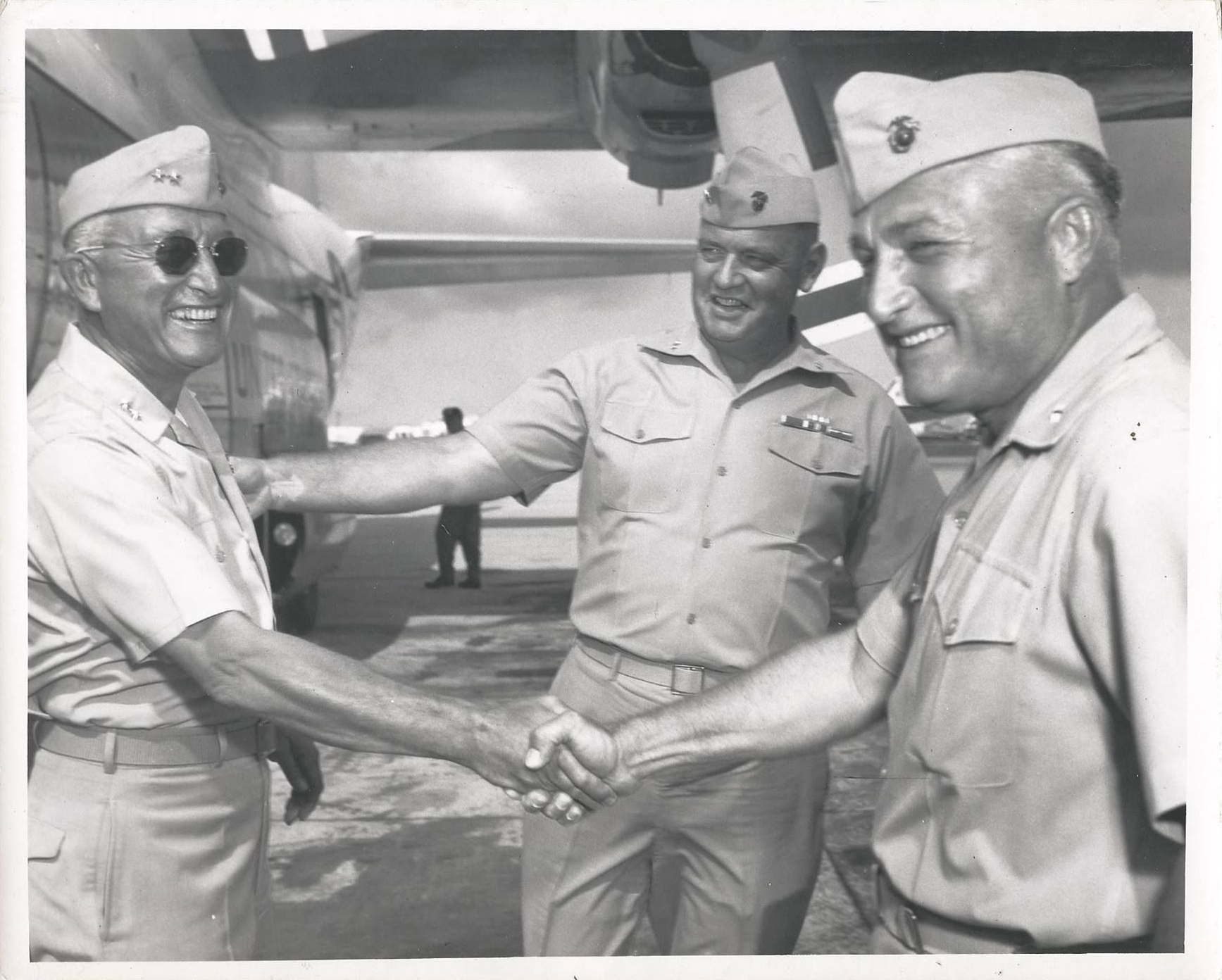
James M. Masters Sr. (left) shake hands with his brother, Brigadier General John H. Masters, Assistant Division Commander. Major General Henry W. Buse Jr. (center) looks on. Master Sr. arrived to Okinawa, Japan on May 10, 1963, in order to relieve Maj. General Buse as Commanding General, 3rd Marine Division.

Masters was ordered back to China in September 1945 and assumed duties as commanding officer of 1st Battalion, 5th Marines. He took part in the occupation duties in Northern China and in the repatriation of Japanese troops. Masters also participated in combats against Chinese communist guerillas and assumed duties as executive officer, 5th Marine Regiment in October 1946 and served in that capacity until May 1947. He was decorated with Chinese Order of the Cloud and Banner by the Government of Republic of China.

He returned to the United States in July 1947 and resumed his former duties as aide-de-camp to the commandant of the Marine Corps, General Vandegrift. Masters continued in this capacity under new commandant, Clifton B. Cates until May 1949, when he was ordered to the Senior Course at Marine Corps Schools, Quantico.

Upon graduation in June 1950, Masters was appointed Chief, General Subjects Group of Combined Arms Section at the Quantico Schools and held that assignment until his promotion to colonel in March 1951, when he assumed duty as assistant director, Junior School of the Amphibious Warfare.

Masters was ordered to Camp Lejeune, North Carolina in March 1952 and succeeded his brother James in command of 8th Marine Regiment, 2nd Marine Division under Major General Edwin A. Pollock. He was transferred to California in February 1954, when he was appointed assistant chief of staff for operations of Camp Pendleton under Major General John T. Selden and held that assignment until August 1955. Masters then remained at Pendleton base and assumed command of 2nd Infantry Training Regiment.

In August 1957, Masters was ordered to Hawaii, where he assumed duty as Inspector, Fleet Marine Force, Pacific under his former superior, Edwin A. Pollock. His tour ended in May 1958, but he remained on Hawaii and assumed command of 4th Marine Regiment attached to the 1st Marine Brigade under Brigadier General Avery R. Kier.

He returned to the United States in August 1959 and was attached to the Headquarters Marine Corps as assistant director of personnel and deputy to Major General August Larson. Masters remained in that capacity until February 1960, when he relieved retiring Brigadier General James D. Hittle as legislative assistant to the Commandant of the Marine Corps, David M. Shoup. While in this capacity, Masters was promoted to the rank of brigadier general in July 1960.

Masters served in this capacity until October 1962, when he was ordered to Okinawa, Japan as assistant division commander, 3rd Marine Division under Major General Henry W. Buse Jr. When General Buse was ordered to the United States in May 1963, as his successor was selected James M. Masters. It was the first time in Marine Corps history that a brother team ran a Marine Division.

He was ordered back to the United States in October 1963 and attached to the Supply Department at Headquarters Marine Corps. In December of that year, Masters was appointed Assistant Quartermaster General of the Marine Corps and deputy to Major General William P. Battell. In this capacity, he was co-responsible for the support of development, production, acquisition, and sustainment of general supply, Mortuary Affairs, subsistences, petroleum and water, material and distribution management during peace and war to provide combat power to the U.S. Marine Corps units.

While in this capacity, Masters was promoted to major general in August 1964. He was ordered to California in May 1965 and assumed command of Marine Supply Center Barstow, which was responsible for the logistics support of the Marine Forces in the Pacific during the early years of Vietnam War. He held that command until November 1967 and received the Legion of Merit for his service.

Masters was subsequently ordered to Norfolk, Virginia, where he joined the headquarters, Atlantic Fleet as deputy chief of staff to the commander in chief, Admiral Ephraim P. Holmes. He served in this capacity until July 31, 1969, when he retired after almost 33 years of active service. Masters received his second Legion of Merit for his service at Norfolk.

== Retirement ==
He then settled in Beaufort, South Carolina, with his wife, Pauline Sullivan Masters, two houses down from General Edwin A. Pollock and enjoyed a wonderful retirement. Major General John H. Masters died on October 22, 1987, and is buried at Saint Helenas Episcopal Churchyard in Beaufort, South Carolina.

== Decorations ==
Masters was awarded the following decorations:

1st row	Legion of Merit with Combat "V" and one 5/16" gold star		
2nd row	American Defense Service Medal	European–African–Middle Eastern Campaign Medal with one 3/16 inch service star	American Campaign Medal
3rd row	Asiatic-Pacific Campaign Medal with one 3/16 inch service star	World War II Victory Medal	China Service Medal
4th row	Navy Occupation Service Medal	National Defense Service Medal with one star	Chinese Order of the Cloud and Banner, 4th Class

== See also ==
- Sino-American Cooperative Organization

Military offices
Preceded by Herman Nickerson Jr.	Commanding general of the Marine Supply Center Barstow; May 1965 – November 1967	Succeeded by James E. Herbold
