= James M. Masters Sr. =

American military officer (1911–1988)

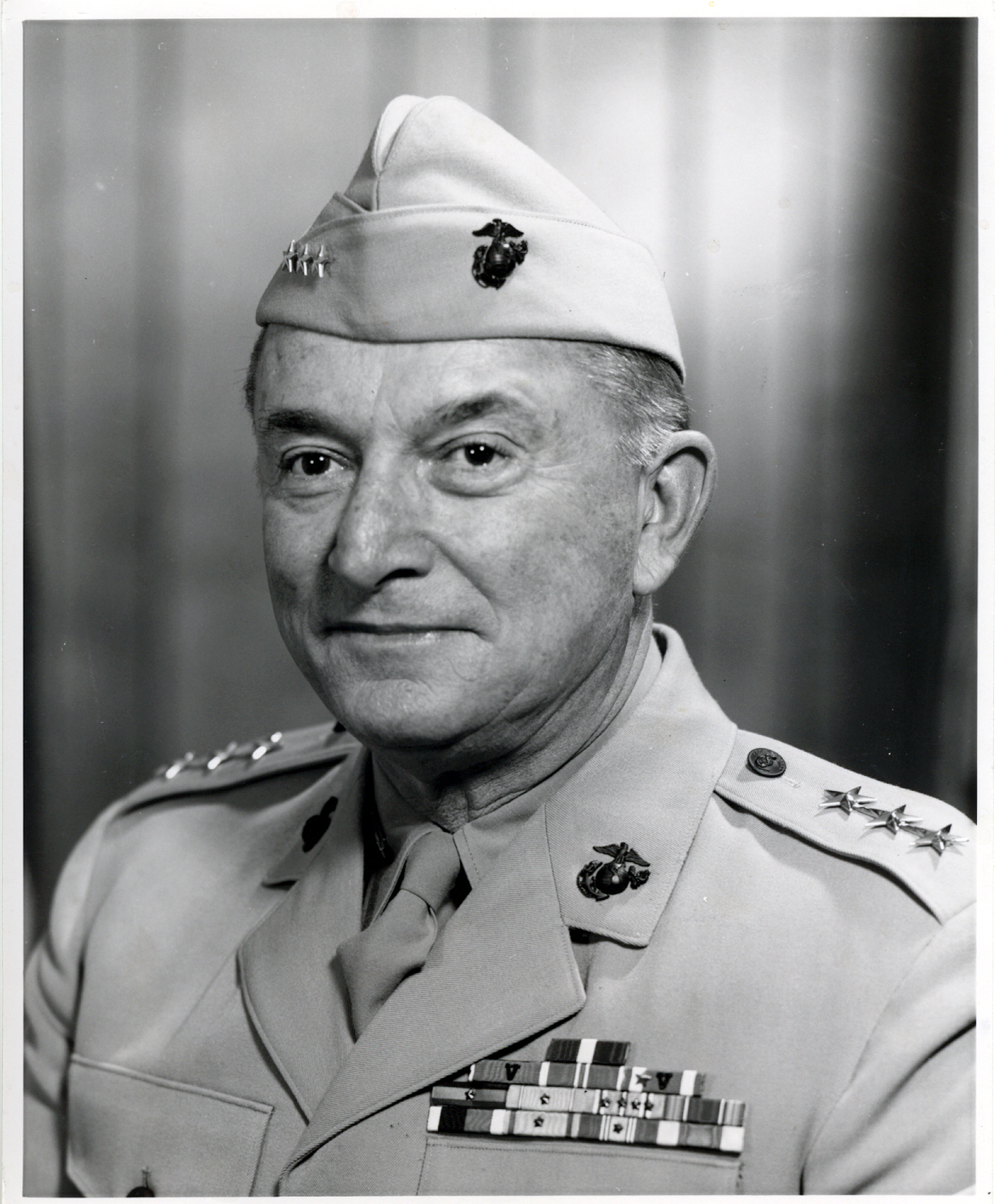
- Masters in 1967
- Born: June 16, 1911; Atlanta, Georgia, U.S.
- Died: August 5, 1988 (aged 77); Washington, D.C., U.S.
- Burial place: Arlington National Cemetery
- Relatives: John H. Masters (brother)
- Military career
- Allegiance: United States of America
- Branch: United States Marine Corps
- Service years: 1933–1968
- Rank: Lieutenant general
- Nicknames: Jungle Jim, El Tigre (The Tiger)
- Service number: 77925
- Commands: 2nd Battalion, 1st Marines; The Basic School; 8th Marine Regiment; 4th Marine Regiment; 1st Marine Division; 3rd Marine Division; USMC Development and Education Command
- Wars: World War II; Cold War
- Awards: Navy Cross; Distinguished Service Medal; Legion of Merit; Bronze Star

James Marvin Masters Sr. (June 11, 1911 – August 5, 1988) was a United States Marine Corps lieutenant general who during the course of his career served as a China Marine, fought in numerous battles in the Pacific during World War II and commanded units from platoon to division size. He received the Navy Cross for his actions during the Battle of Okinawa and was also a recipient of the Distinguished Service Medal during a military career that spanned the 35 years between 1933 and 1968. He died at his home in Washington, D.C., on 5 August 1988.

== Early life and education ==
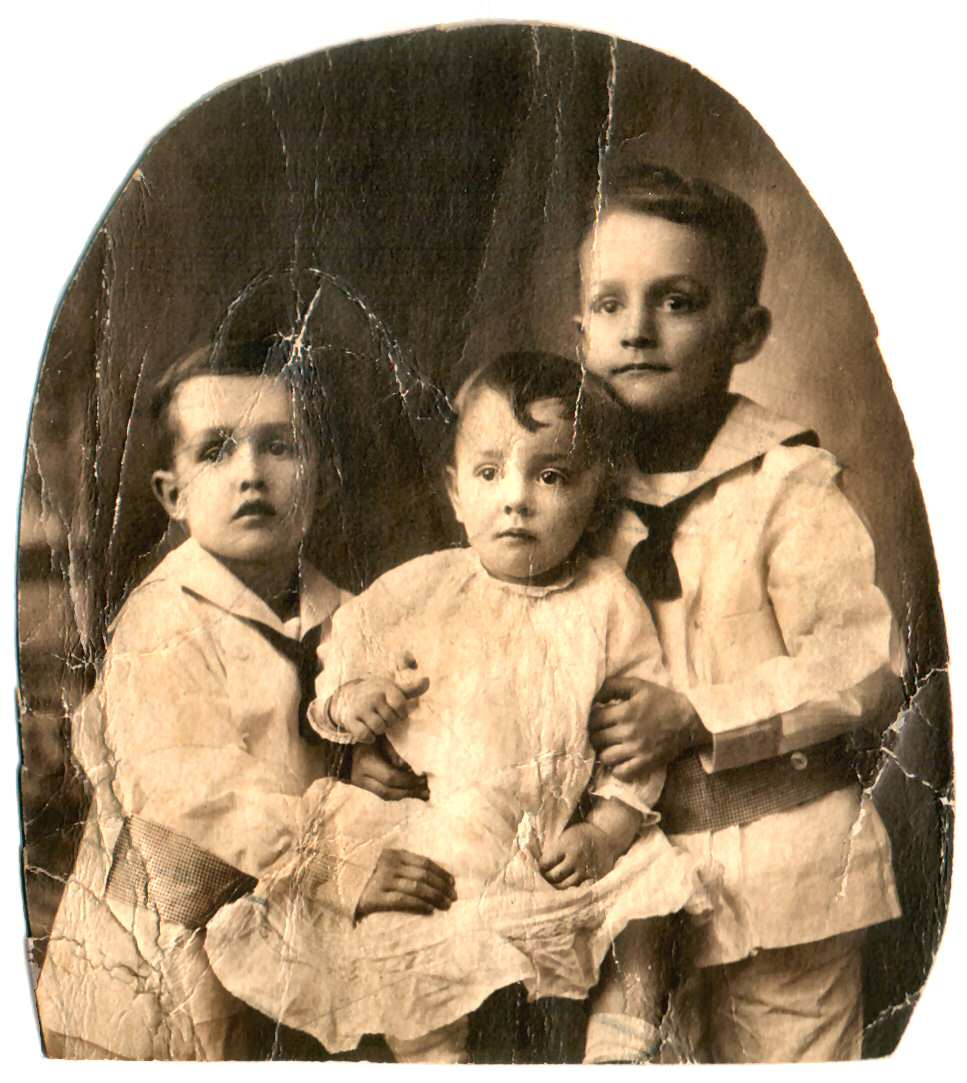
The Masters brothers: James (right), John (left), and William (center)

Masters' 1933 Naval Academy graduation photo, see full article

James Marvin Masters (who was designated 'Sr.' after his namesake father died in 1936) was born 16 June 1911, in Atlanta, Georgia. When he was 12 years old, his grandfather (a one-time Confederate soldier in the 15th South Carolina Infantry Regiment) died, and his father moved his wife (Cecilia Hale Masters) and three sons back to the family farm in Anderson, South Carolina. There, James would frequently hunt his family's dinner.

Masters completed high school at Anderson in 1927 at age 16, delivering the valedictory speech when he was still only 16, saying, "If we fail to prepare for our role in society, we play falsely with our God, our country, and with the inner man, our conscience." Though he had appointments to both the United States Military Academy and the United States Naval Academy upon high school graduation, his father thought Masters too young to enter immediately, and insisted that his son attend The Citadel for a year. A cousin, a Naval Academy graduate, encouraged him to attend Annapolis instead of West Point, which he did in 1929. His appointment before the Wall Street Crash of 1929 spared him from the business loss his father incurred.

During his battleship cruise to the Azores, Halifax, and Bermuda in 1932, Masters opted for the Marine Corps, observing "...that really made up my mind, because I’d read so much about Marine camaraderie. And I’d also observed it within Marine detachments on board ship, the close relationship between officers and men." He found a role model in Commandant of the Marine Corps John A. Lejeune, who had retired that year. Due to the Great Depression, the academy could only fund commissions for half of the graduating class in 1933, Masters included.

== Marine Corps Career ==
=== Early career ===
Masters was commissioned as a second lieutenant on 1 June 1933, then reported to The Basic School at the Philadelphia Naval Shipyard. The financial difficulties of the time reached him even there. One of Masters's instructors, Anthony Joseph Drexel Biddle Sr. (nicknamed "Bayonet Tony") took the young Marine under his wing to teach him in close combat. He graduated in May 1934 in the smallest-ever class: 20 academy graduates and one mustang.

Masters was then assigned to the Marine Detachment aboard the USS New Mexico (BB-40). Captained by John W. Reeves Jr. at the time, the ship was the flagship of the Pacific Fleet, and Masters was soon qualified as a watch officer In July 1935, he joined the 1st Marine Brigade at Marine Corps Base Quantico. Thanks to the expiration of the then-mandatory marriage waiting-period (for two years after graduation), Masters was free to marry his sweetheart Dorice "Dottie" Mary Kengla, who was the sister of his Naval Academy classmate and also newly commissioned 2nd Lt. William A. Kengla, on 14 September 1935.

In the 1937 edition of Do or Die, Lt Kengla (right) demonstrates how to conduct an "unruly captive".

James and Dottie maintained a friendship with Tony Biddle and his wife, Cordelia. In 1937, Biddle wrote a combat manual entitled Do or Die, noting in the dedication: "During the period of his service as instructor, the writer enjoyed the able assistance of Lieutenant James M. Masters, USMC, and Lieutenant William A. Kengla USMC. The two latter named gentlemen were formerly pupils of the writer in Individual Combat at the United States Marine Corps Basic School for Officers: they are both fine swordsmen. Being of inventive genius, Lieutenants Masters and Kengla devised several excellent new forms of attack and defense, as shown in this treatise." Biddle's bayonet techniques can still be seen in skills taught in recruit training today.

After the Fleet Landing Exercises, which saw the USS Arkansas landing 1st Battalion 5th Marines at Culebra, Puerto Rico, during January to May 1936, Masters became Personnel, Intelligence, and Communications Officer for the 1st Battalion, 1st Marine Brigade. He was promoted to first lieutenant in July 1936. In August of that year, Masters assumed duties in the Headquarters Company, and began to express his desire to grow in leadership. In December, he became an aide-de-camp to Brigadier General James J. Meade, the brigade commander. The brigade was soon transferred to the West Coast of the United States, where Masters was detached from the unit for reassignment to the Fourth Marine Regiment in China.

=== China ===
Lt Masters and wife (center) with LtCol Rupertus and wife (right) aboard the China-bound SS President Polk

In February 1937, Masters and his wife departed from the Wilmington neighborhood of Los Angeles on the liner SS President Polk for Shanghai, a trip he shared with First Lieutenant Victor H. Krulak, Lieutenant Colonel William H. Rupertus, and their wives. Because Dorice and Rupertus's wife Alice had gone to school together, James earned his senior's trust and was offered a position in the elder's future command: 1st Battalion 4th Marines.

Masters and wife (far right) with Rupertus and wife (at left), partying with other Marines at the French Club in Shanghai

In 1937, Charles F. B. Price commanded the regiment in China; Price’s wife Dolly was godmother to Dorice, and this connection got Masters a prime assignment. He worked for LtCol Francis I. Fenton in the regiment's deputy Athletic Officer and Club Officer, and became editor for the regiment's newsweekly magazine, the Walla Walla, purportedly meaning "much talk" in Chinese.

Masters and his wife enjoyed an active social life through the Spring and early Summer – in the company of other Marines and members of the English-speaking community in Shanghai.

But, the lively social scene unraveled on 7 July 1937, when the Marco Polo Bridge Incident signaled the beginning of the Second Sino-Japanese War. In mid-August 1937, the Chinese attempted a bombing raid on the Japanese Fleet. The raid was ineffectual, a few bombs even strayed into the Shanghai International Settlement, killing civilians. But it gave Masters his first ‘taste’ of combat, and he soon arranged to be given a command: a platoon and later Company F, under 2nd Battalion commander Roswell Winans. Despite being stationed in the Suzhou Creek, his platoon never directly engaged Japanese troops, but witnessed the Defense of Sihang Warehouse. After defending Americans from Japanese harassment until September 1938, he was temporarily assigned to the SS President Coolidge, in Shanghai port to supervise the security during loading of the gold and silver bullion that belonged to Chase Bank.

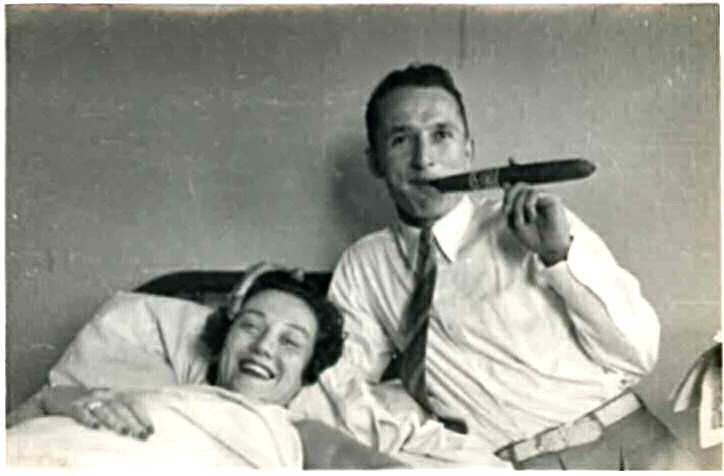
James Sr. and his wife Dorice just after the birth of James Jr.

On 16 August 1939, Dorice gave birth to a son, James Jr., who earned the nickname "Champ" after a slightly-inebriated suggestion from Bruno Hochmuth. The following month, Masters Sr. was promoted to captain.

=== Interim ===
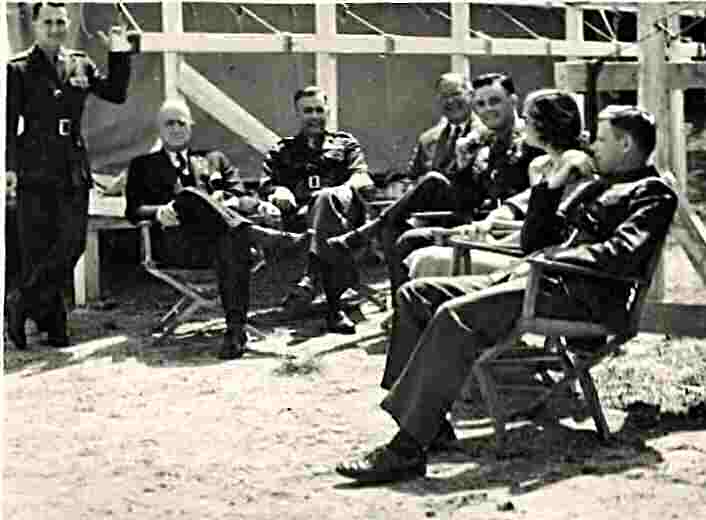
Masters (standing) and his Marines with President Franklin D. Roosevelt at Warm Springs

In November, he returned to the United States, and was assigned to Marine Barracks, Washington, D.C., again under William Rupertus until June 1940. In March 1940, he became a company commander in the Marine Guard detachment at President Franklin D. Roosevelt's personal retreat at Warm Springs, Georgia, under the command of LtCol Charles T. Brooks, and became close to the president during an extended retreat. At one point, the guards performed silent exhibition drill for the president and patients at the Roosevelt Warm Springs Institute for Rehabilitation.

In June 1940, Masters served briefly again at MCB Quantico during the Officer Candidates School's Platoon Leaders Course. In September, he was assigned to Marine Corps Base, Parris Island in South Carolina, as a battery commanding officer with the 4th Defense Battalion. He and his family were transferred with the battalion to Guantanamo Bay Naval Base in Cuba in February 1941. In November, they embarked on board the USS Henderson with the battalion for Pearl Harbor, Hawaii – the week before the surprise attack there.

=== World War II ===
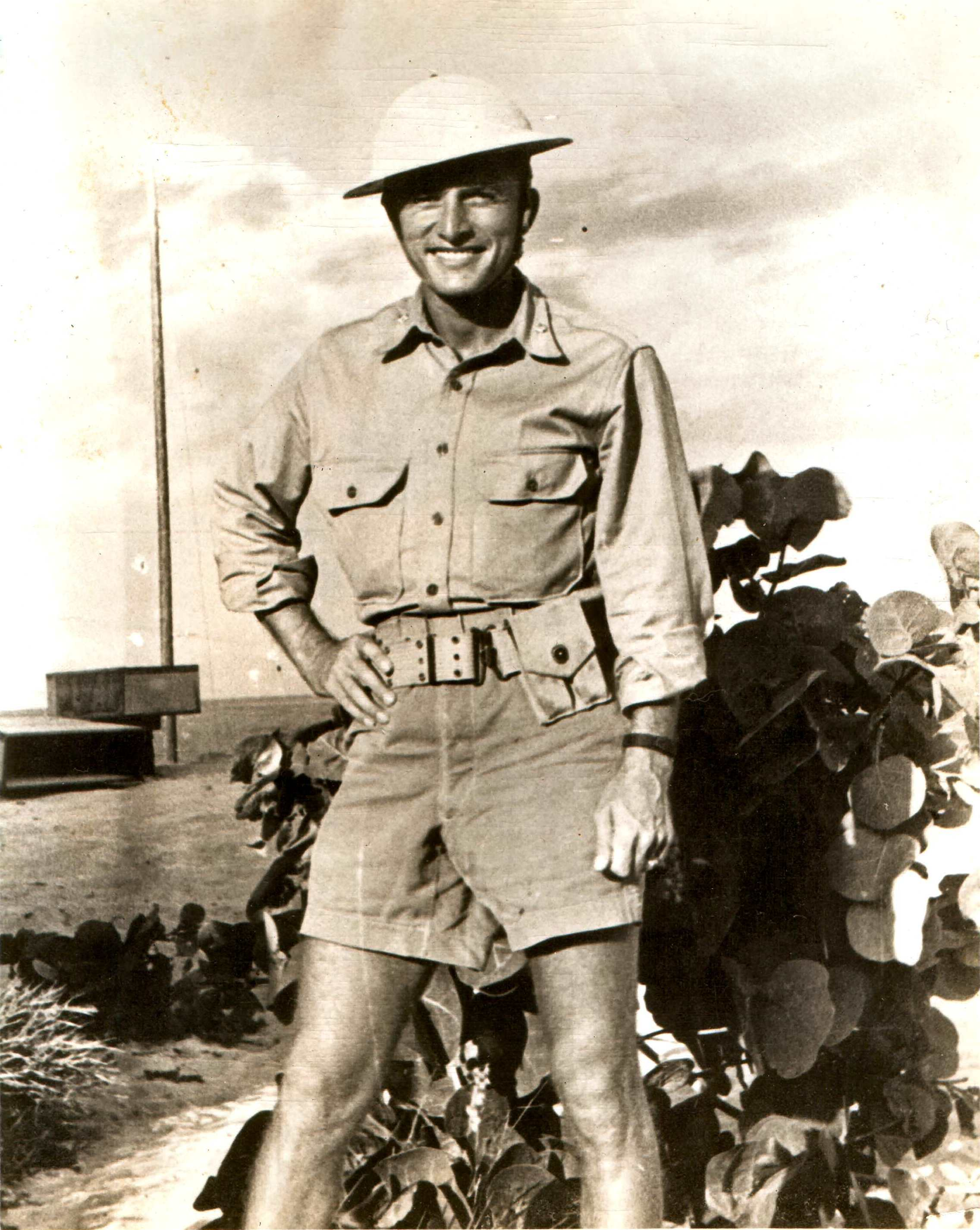
Masters as a major in 1942

The Masters family arrived in Pearl Harbor on 1 December 1941. As the air attack raged on the Sunday morning of December 7, James was slowed by gawking sight-seers on the road to Pearl, and couldn't make it to his post until the attack was over. President Roosevelt declared war the next day, and Masters embarked aboard the USS Mahan en route to and in command of the first reinforcements for Johnston Island on Christmas Day, not to see his family again for more than two years.

Masters would remain at Johnston Island until November 1942, receiving a Bronze Star for his service there, as well as a promotion to major in May. Shortly after Masters' promotion, Admiral Chester W. Nimitz paid a visit to Johnston, boosting morale.

Masters then returned to Pearl Harbor to join the 10th Defense Battalion in November 1942. Later, as executive officer of the battalion, attached to the I Marine Amphibious Corps, he served in the Solomon and Russell Islands. He was promoted to lieutenant colonel in April 1943. In August of that year, he commanded 2nd Battalion 1st Marines briefly in Australia prior to bringing the unit into combat again from December 1943 to February 1944 at the Battle of Cape Gloucester, again under the command of Rupertus, now the commanding general of the 1st Marine Division.

==== New Britain ====
The Battle of Cape Gloucester was part of the larger New Britain campaign, named Operation Dexterity, in turn part of Operation Cartwheel of the Solomon Islands and New Guinea campaigns. While at Finschhafen preparing for the Cape Gloucester landings, General Douglas MacArthur inquired of Masters, "Young man, are you ready for this operation?" He replied, "More important, General, my troops are ready," which drew a grin from MacArthur.

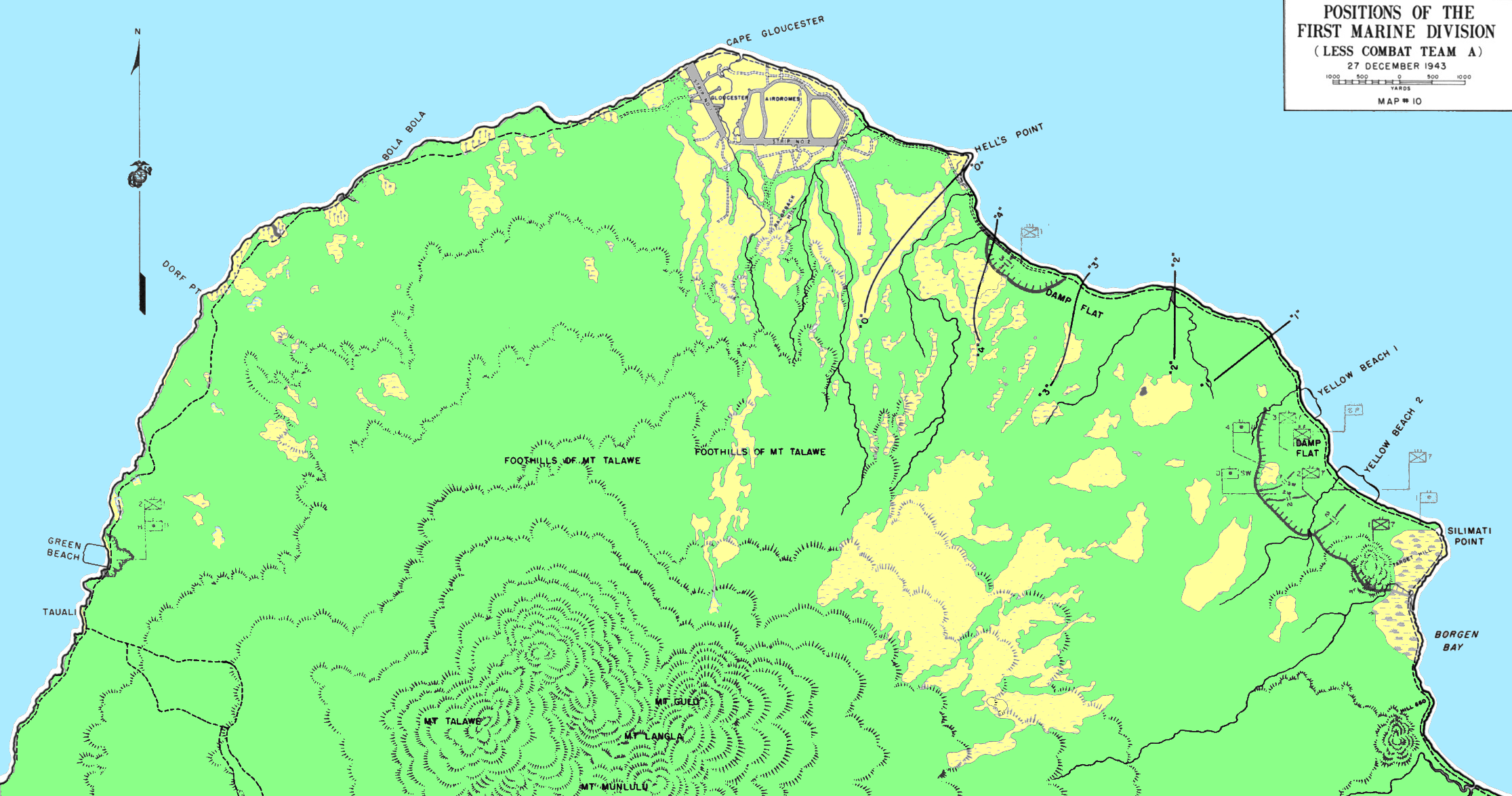
Green Beach to the southwest, Yellow Beaches to the southeast of the Airdrome (north central)

Masters' two-fold trail blocking mission was defensive in nature. Firstly, after landing at Green Beach (southwest of what is today Cape Gloucester Airport, near the western side of Mount Talawe), his battalion (code-named Stoneface Group) was to block attempts by enemy troops to retreat in a south-westerly direction from the main Japanese force at the airdrome. Secondly, in case the battle to capture the two airstrips was protracted, his command was to prevent Japanese reinforcements from the south. Once the airdrome was under Marine control, 2nd Battalion was to rejoin its regiment and link up with the rest of the 1st Division.

On D-Day, the morning of 26 December 1943, the first wave of Landing Craft Mechanized landed as planned on Green beach. The landing was unopposed, and even after the Marines were ashore, no enemy resistance was encountered. By nightfall Stoneface Group had met all of its defensive position objectives and began patrolling vigorously inland to locate enemy troops. Except for a communication barrier due to mountainous terrain that made contact with division headquarters tedious, the first two days were without major incident, just a few skirmishes.

As daylight faded on 29 December, the volume of Japanese fire from the jungle began to increase, signaling an imminent attack against Stoneface defenses. At about 2 AM the next morning, the Japanese made a Banzai charge, which cost the Marines 6 men killed at the point of attack. For a few moments, enemy troops occupied part of Stoneface Group's front lines, but were repulsed when Gunnery Sergeant Guiseppe [sic] Guilano Jr. stepped into the breach with a light machine gun. A second Japanese assault nearly overran Marine positions, but again it was beaten back, with Guilano (wounded seven times during the night) at the forefront. After the second failed assault, two further dispirited banzai attacks were stopped cold. As dawn broke, a casualty count found 6 Marines killed with 13 wounded, while enemy losses were counted by a burial detachment at 256 at the front lines (though another source indicates "at least 89 enemy dead,"). Five prisoners were captured, including a Japanese officer who spoke English. When MacArthur learned of the captured officer, he sent a PT boat to deliver the prisoner to Finschhafen for interrogation. Later, MacArthur sent a congratulatory dispatch indicating that the prisoner was the first Japanese officer of the war to be captured alive. Masters recommended Guilano for the Medal of Honor for his heroics, but it was downgraded by Rupertus to a Navy Cross.

First Marine Division presents to you an early New Year Gift, the complete aerdrome [sic] of Cape Gloucester. Situation well in hand due to fighting spirit of troops, the usual Marine luck, and the help of God. Both strips occupied at noon. Consolidating perimeter defense around drome.

— 30 December dispatch signed: "Rupertus grinning at Krueger"

Once the entire airdrome was firmly in Marine hands, General Rupertus raised the American flag there and dispatched the news to General Walter Krueger. No longer in need of the trail block west of Mount Talawe, General Rupertus ordered Masters to secure his battalion and rejoin the division. After securing its wounded, equipment, and supplies, 2nd Battalion made a march from Green Beach into the division lines at the airdrome, at which point the Stoneface Group was disbanded on 12 January 1944.

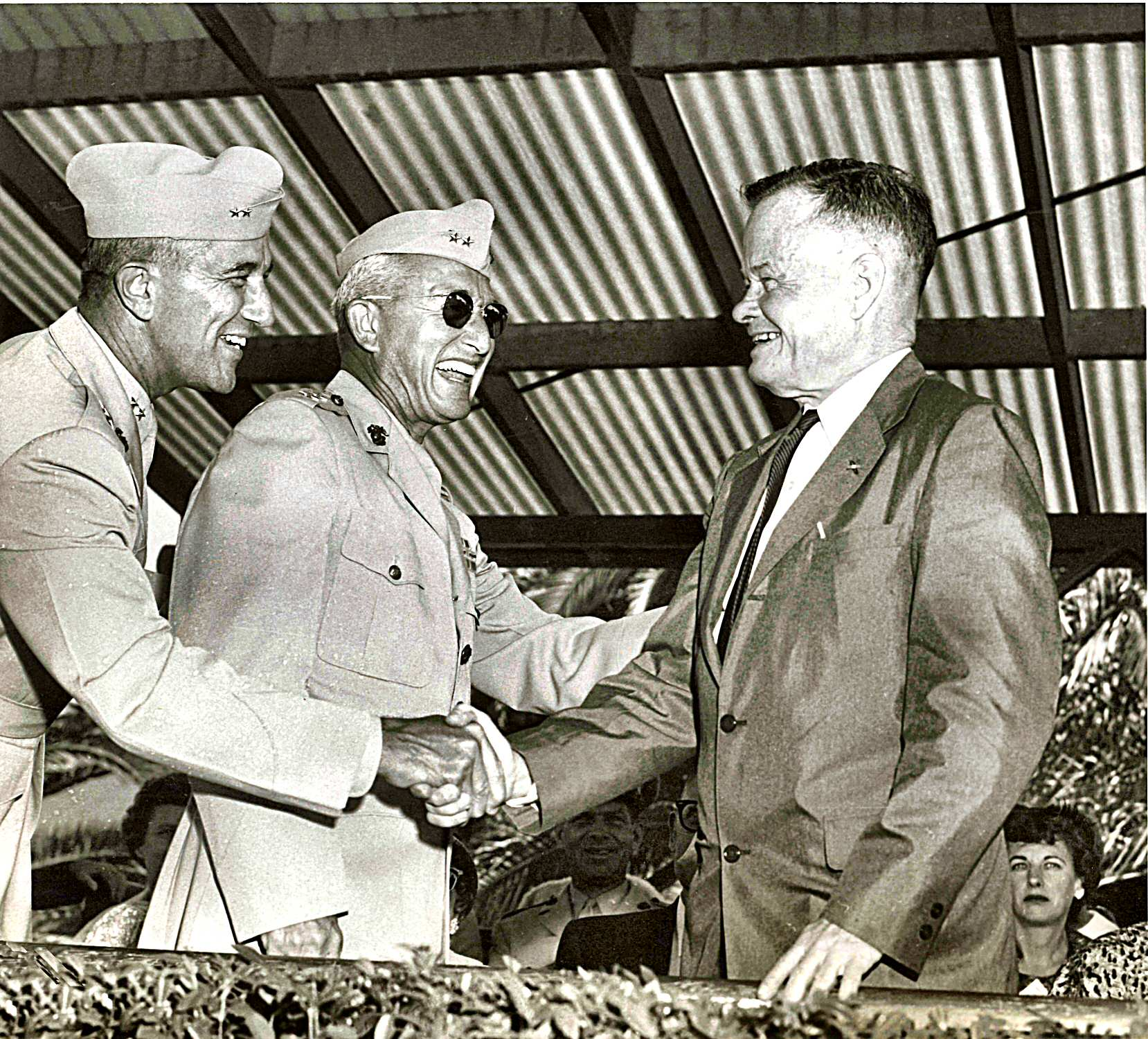
All smiles, twenty years later... MajGen Masters (center) and MajGen Nickerson welcome then-retired Chesty Puller to Camp Pendleton in 1962.

After a couple of days to rest, and attempts to dry out the "jungle rot" between rain squalls, Masters and his battalion were reassigned to the 7th Marine Regiment, commanded by Julian 'Bull' Frisbie. When Masters reported, he was met by executive officer LtCol Lewis "Chesty" Puller, with whom he had served in China. Puller took the opportunity to indulge in some combat humor at the expense of Masters (the junior officer) by belittling the 2nd Battalion's 'little fight' at the hands of the Banzai charging Japanese troops at Mt. Talawe.

For his actions on Cape Gloucester, Masters was awarded the Legion of Merit, somewhat unusual for a combat commander to receive, in place of the Silver Star. After 37 consecutive months overseas, he returned to the United States in March 1944 for duty at Headquarters Marine Corps with the Division of Plans and Policies, G-3. Upon seeing him for the first time in more than two years, his now-nearly five-year-old son didn't know who he was. In September, Masters detached for duty at Pearl Harbor, and on Guam, Saipan, and Tinian.

==== Okinawa ====
In November 1944, Masters was transferred to the 7th Marine Regiment and began serving as executive officer at Pavuvu. From April to June 1945, he fought in the Battle of Okinawa, where he earned the Navy Cross for manning a vital observation post under heavy attack during the assault on Dakeshi Ridge.

=== Post-war ===
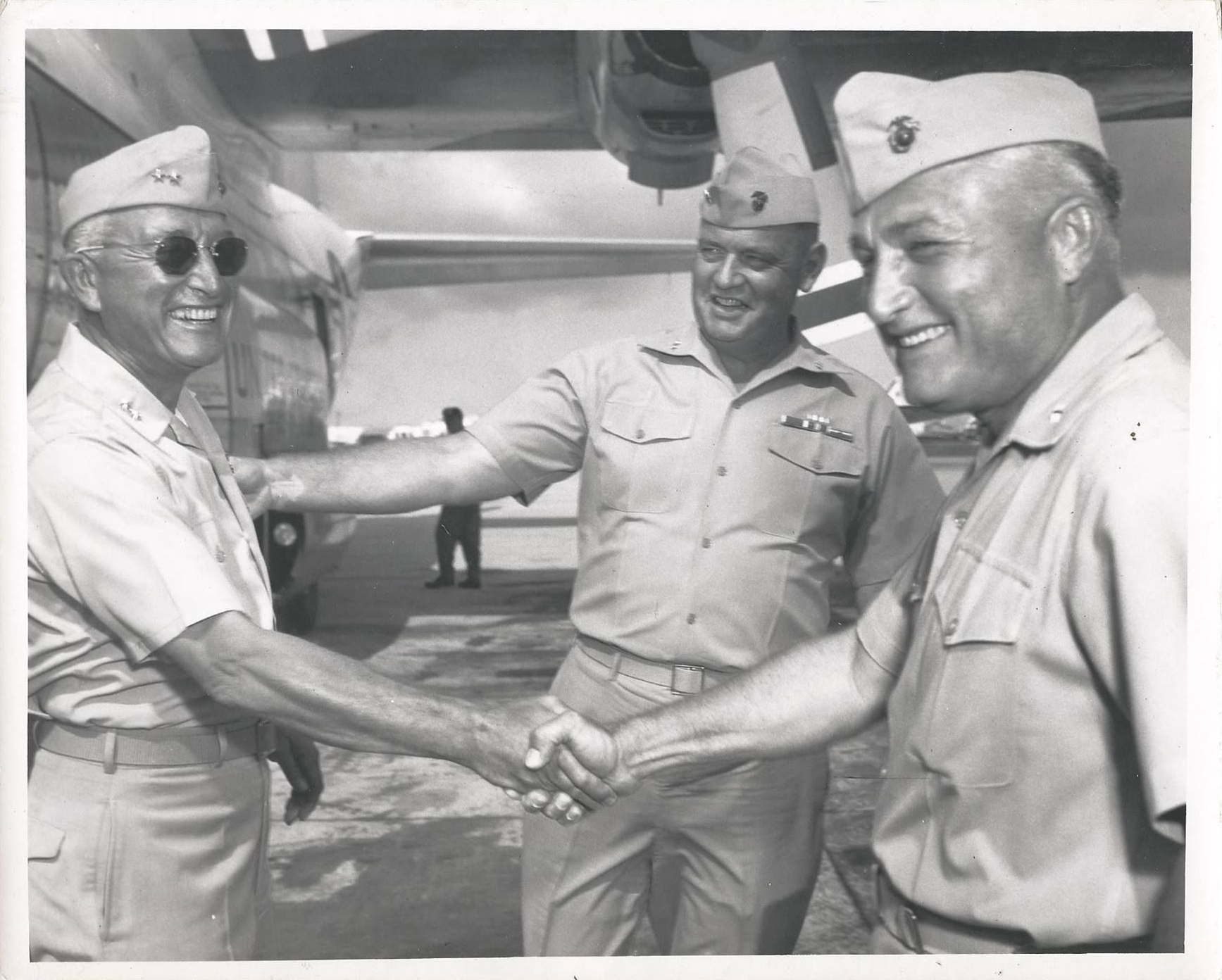
James M. Masters Sr. (left) shake hands with his brother, Brigadier General John H. Masters, assistant division commander. Major General Henry W. Buse Jr. (center) looks on. Master Sr. arrived to Okinawa, Japan on May 10, 1963, in order to relieve general Buse as commanding general, 3rd Marine Division.

Masters returned to China in October 1945 as the Assistant Chief of Staff, G-2 for 1st Marine Division at Tientsin until he returned to the United States in March 1946. He was again assigned to Headquarters Marine Corps where, in May 1946, he began a two-year assignment in the Inspection Division. In May 1948, he was ordered to the Marine Corps Schools, Quantico, serving as executive officer, and later, commanding officer of the Basic School. He was promoted to colonel in August 1949. In September 1950, he was transferred to Camp Lejeune in North Carolina, to assume command of the 8th Marine Regiment, 2nd Marine Division for 18 months. He attended the National War College from August 1952 to June 1953, then became a member of the Joint Strategic Plans Group, for the Joint Chiefs of Staff, for two years.

In August 1955, Masters took command of the 4th Marine Regiment, 3rd Marine Division, at Marine Corps Air Station Kaneohe Bay, Hawaii until he was named Fleet Marine Force, Pacific Liaison Officer to the Commander in Chief, Pacific Fleet in June 1956. While serving in this capacity, he was promoted to brigadier general in July 1957. He returned to Headquarters Marine Corps as assistant chief of staff, Marine Corps Intelligence G-2 in September 1957. He was assigned additional duty as Inspector General of the Marine Corps in June 1960, and was promoted to major general the following month. He continued in the post until July 1961.

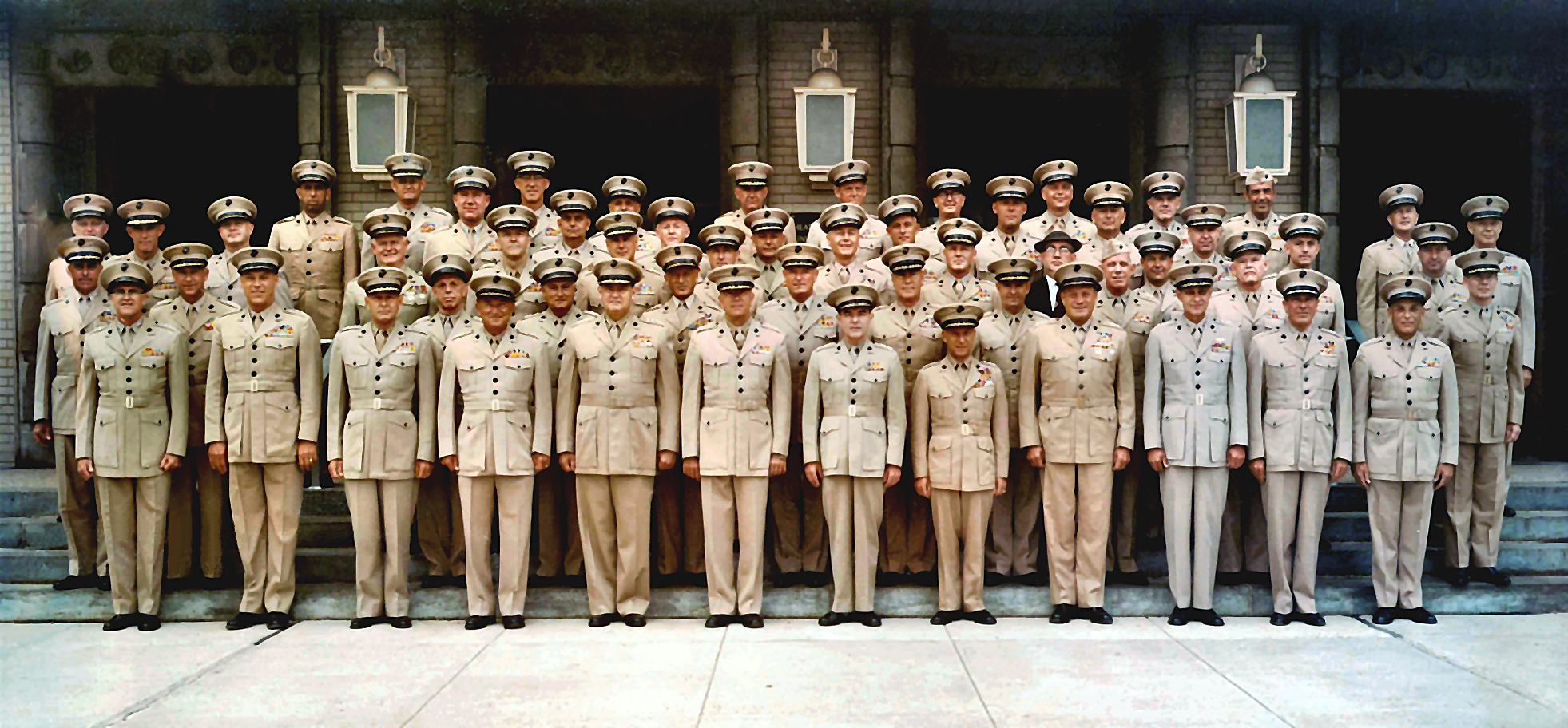
LtGen Masters (front row, 4th from left) at the 1967 General Officers Symposium

Masters assumed command of 1st Marine Division at Marine Corps Base Camp Pendleton, California, on 31 July 1961, until June 1962, when he became the commanding general of the base. He returned to Okinawa in May 1963 to command 3rd Marine Division. He then commanded Marine Corps Recruit Depot Parris Island from 19 June 1964 to 15 June 1966. Promoted to lieutenant general on 1 July 1966, he was assigned duty as commandant, Marine Corps Schools, Quantico. In January 1968, Marine Corps Schools was redesignated Marine Corps Development and Education Command, and Masters's title was changed to "Commanding General".

Masters was presented the Navy Distinguished Service Medal by Commandant Leonard F. Chapman Jr. during his retirement ceremony at Quantico, 28 June 1968. He died at his home in Washington, D.C., on 5 August 1988.Masters was buried at Arlington National Cemetery, in Arlington, Virginia.

== Awards & honors ==
A complete list of his medals and decorations includes:

Navy Cross		Navy Distinguished Service Medal	
Legion of Merit w/ valor device	Bronze Star	Navy and Marine Corps Commendation Medal w/ 1 award star & valor device	Navy Presidential Unit Citation w/ 1 service star
China Service Medal w/ 1 service star	American Defense Service Medal w/ Base clasp	Asiatic-Pacific Campaign Medal w/ 5 service stars	World War II Victory Medal
Navy Occupation Service Medal	National Defense Service Medal w/ 1 service star	Order of the Cloud and Banner	Order of Service Merit, 2nd class

=== Navy Cross citation ===
The President of the United States takes pride in presenting the Navy Cross to

James M. Masters
Lieutenant Colonel
U.S. Marine Corps

for service as set forth in the following citation:

For extraordinary heroism as Executive Officer of the Seventh Marines, First Marine Division, in action against enemy Japanese forces during the assault on Dakeshi Ridge, Okinawa, Ryukyu Islands, from 10 to 12 May 1945. On 10 May, when the advance of the Regiment was checked by a strong hostile force, Lieutenant Colonel Masters unhesitatingly went forward of the front lines on reconnaissance and obtained information concerning the Japanese and unfamiliar terrain which enabled a successful attack to be made the following day. On 11 May, he established an advanced observation post in the only possible position on the front lines from which the attack that day could be observed and directed and, despite unusually heavy casualties at the post from intense enemy mortar and small-arms fire, continued to man it and report information vital to the capture of desperately defended Dakeshi Ridge, Moving the observation post forward again on 12 May, he advanced under intense hostile fire to the Ridge before that ground had been completely seized by assault troops and, although the Japanese continued to inflict heavy casualties on his force, persevered in his mission to observe the enemy and terrain, thus securing information which aided materially in the formulation of successful plans for continuing the attack. His inspiring leadership, courage and unremitting devotion to duty throughout were in keeping with the highest traditions of the United States Naval Service.

== See also ==
- List of notable United States Marines
