= William T. Fairbourn =

U.S. Marine Corps Major General

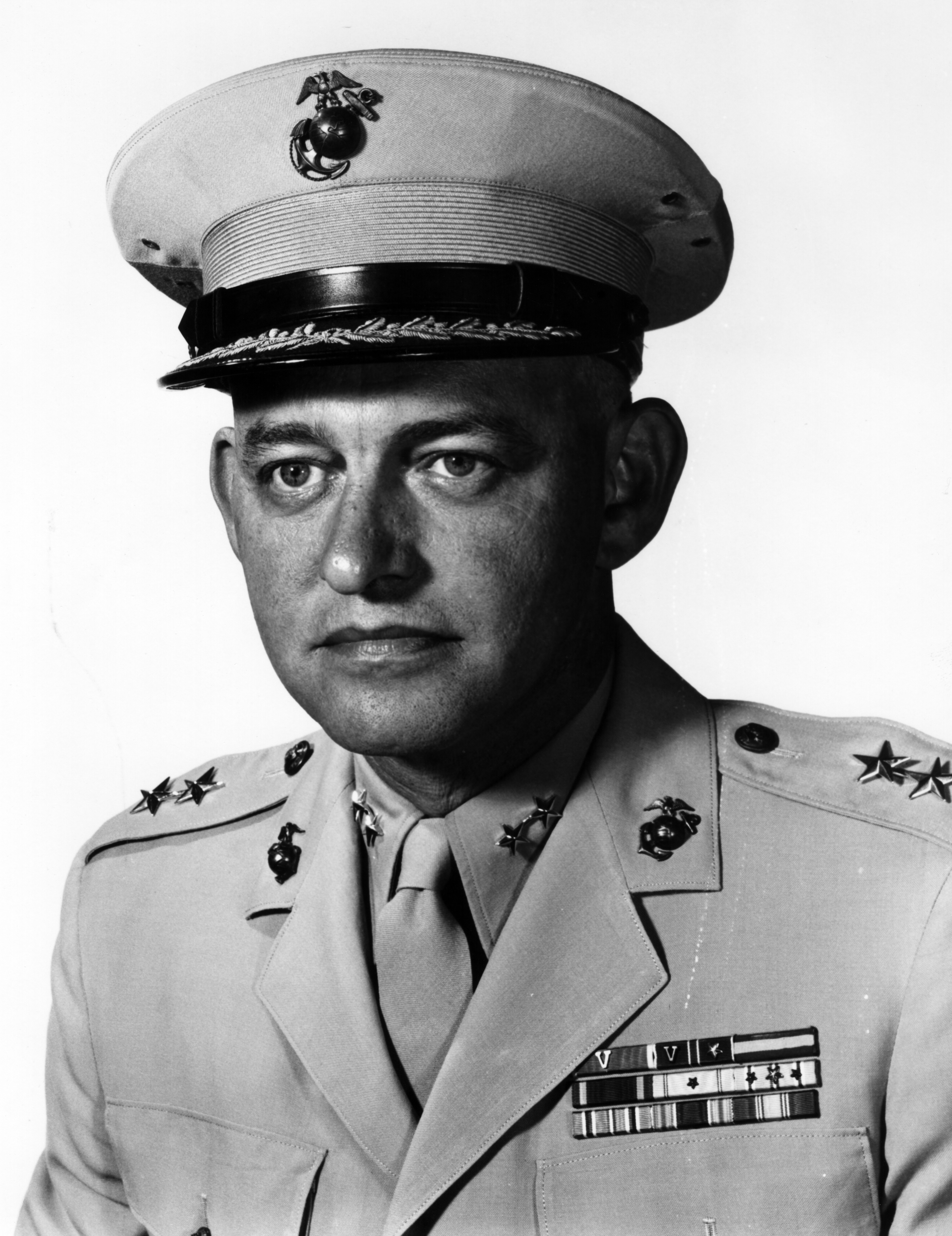
- MG William T. Fairbourn, USMC
- Born: June 28, 1914; Sandy, Utah, United States
- Died: February 21, 1987 (aged 72); Salt Lake City, Utah, United States
- Burial place: Arlington National Cemetery
- Military career
- Allegiance: United States
- Branch: United States Marine Corps
- Service years: 1935–1967
- Rank: Major general
- Service number: 0-5109
- Commands: 1st Marine Division; Marine Corps Reserve; 5th Marine Expeditionary Brigade; 11th Marine Regiment
- Conflicts: World War II: Battle of Midway; Battle of the Coral Sea; Bougainville Campaign; Recapture of Guam; Battle of Iwo Jima; Cuban Missile Crisis
- Awards: Legion of Merit; Bronze Star Medal (2)
- Other work: Nuclear arms race activist

William Taro Fairbourn (June 28, 1914 – February 21, 1987) was an American decorated officer of the United States Marine Corps with the rank of major general. He is most noted as commanding general of the 5th Marine Expeditionary Brigade during the Cuban Missile Crisis and later served as commanding general of 1st Marine Division. Fairbourn was later known as a Nuclear arms race activist.

== Early years ==
William T. Fairbourn was born on June 28, 1914, in Sandy, Utah, as the son of William Reuben Fairbourn and his wife Violet Veneda Jensen. His father served as Sheriff Deputy in Sandy and young William attended high school there. He then attended University of Utah in Salt Lake City and graduated in June 1935 with Bachelor degree. While at University, Fairbourn was a cadet colonel of ROTC unit and also was regimental honor graduate.

Fairbourn was subsequently commissioned second lieutenant in the Marine Corps on July 10, 1935, and ordered to the Basic School at Philadelphia Navy Yard for further officers education. With 124 students, it was the largest Basic School class to that date. This class provided two future Marine Corps Commandants (Leonard F. Chapman Jr. and Robert E. Cushman Jr.), five lieutenant generals (Lewis J. Fields, Frederick E. Leek, Herman Nickerson Jr., William J. Van Ryzin, Richard G. Weede), five major generals (William R. Collins, Fairbourn, Bruno Hochmuth, Raymond L. Murray, Carey A. Randall) and six brigadier generals (William W. Buchanan, Odell M. Conoley, Frederick P. Henderson, Roy L. Kline, John C. Miller Jr., Thomas F. Riley).

Fairbourn completed the school in March 1936 and was attached to the 10th Marine Artillery Regiment, 2nd Marine Brigade at Marine Corps Base San Diego, California. He was ordered for the course at Army Field Artillery School at Fort Sill, Oklahoma, where he graduated in June 1938.

Fairbourn was subsequently ordered back to San Diego and promoted to the rank of first lieutenant in October of that year. He remained in San Diego until June 1940, when he was ordered for sea duty.

== World War II ==
Fairbourn was attached to the heavy cruiser USS Chester as commanding officer of Marine detachment and was promoted to the rank of captain in April 1941. He was aboard that ship, when Japanese attacked Pearl Harbor in December 1941 and subsequently took part in the actions on Tulagi, Coral Sea or Midway.

Fairbourn was detached from Chester in June 1942 following the promotion to the rank of major and returned to San Diego, where he served until March 1943. During that period, Fairbourn was attached to the 12th Marine Artillery Regiment, 3rd Marine Division as Regimental Operations officer under Colonel John B. Wilson. The 12th Marines took part in the intensive training at Camp Dunlap, California before sailed to New Zealand in March 1943.

Fairbourn was stationed with the regiment in Auckland until July 1943, when he was promoted to the rank of lieutenant colonel and sailed with the regiment to Guadalcanal for amphibious training in the jungle. The 12th Marines then moved to the island of Efate, New Hebrides in October 1943 in order to prepare for upcoming landing on Bougainville.

The 12th Marines landed on Bougainville as a part of 3rd Marine Division under Major General Allen H. Turnage on November 1, 1943, and took part in the Battle of Piva Forks. General Turnage praised the effectiveness of the artillery on Bougainville and Fairbourn received the Bronze Star Medal with Combat "V" for his service there.

Following the campaign, Fairbourn sailed with the regiment back to Guadalcanal for rest and reequipment and spent next eight months with training. He took part in the recapture of Guam in July 1944 and received his second Bronze Star Medal and Navy Unit Commendation.

Fairbourn subsequently succeeded lieutenant colonel Donald M. Weller in command of 2nd Battalion of his regiment and remained on Guam during the mopping up operations against the small scattered groups of Japanese soldiers. The units of 3rd Marine Division under Major General Graves B. Erskine were ordered for Iwo Jima and landed on February 24, 1945. Fairbourn landed later in the afternoon of that day and following the deployment of his batteries, his battalion began supporting 21st Marine Regiment during the attack on Motoyama Airfield.

The Iwo Jima was declared secured at the end of March 1945 and Fairbourn sailed together with 12th Marines back to Guam. He was decorated with the Legion of Merit with Combat "V" and Navy Presidential Unit Citation for his service on Iwo Jima.

== Postwar service ==
Fairbourn returned to the United States in May 1945 and assumed duty at Marine Training Command at Camp Lejeune under Major General John Marston and served in this capacity until June 1946, when he assumed duty with the Office of the Chief of Naval Operations under Fleet Admiral Chester W. Nimitz. He served in the latter capacity until August 1949, when he was ordered for the instruction at Army Command and General Staff College at Fort Leavenworth, Kansas.

Upon the graduation in June 1950, Fairbourn was ordered to Norfolk Navy Yard, Virginia and attached to the headquarters of Fleet Marine Force, Atlantic. He served under Lieutenant General LeRoy P. Hunt and later under his divisional commander from Iwo Jima, Graves B. Erskine as assistant chief of staff for intelligence and later as assistant chief of staff for operations and was promoted to the rank of colonel in January 1951.

Fairbourn was detached from Norfolk in July 1952 in order to attend Naval War College in Newport, Rhode Island, and completed the Strategy and Tactics course in June 1953. Fairbourn then served for two years on the college staff until he was ordered to Camp Pendleton in July 1955 as commanding officer of 11th Marine Regiment, 1st Marine Division.

Colonel Fairbourn served as chief of staff, 3rd Marine Division under Major General Francis M. McAlister in Okinawa, Japan from November 1957 to March 1958 and returned to the United States one month later. He then served as director of First Marine Corps Reserve and Recruitment District with headquarters at Garden City, New York. Fairbourn was ordered to Washington, D.C., in November 1959 and promoted to the rank of brigadier general. He was subsequently appointed deputy director of Marine Corps Reserve at Headquarters Marine Corps under Major General William W. Stickney and finally succeeded him at the beginning of January 1960.

Fairbourn was transferred to Camp Pendleton, California in July 1962 in order to be appointed assistant division commander, 1st Marine Division under Major General Herman Nickerson. During the Cuban Missile Crisis in October 1962, Fairbourn was appointed commanding general of 5th Marine Expeditionary Brigade detached from 1st Marine Division and sailed for Guantánamo Bay, Cuba. His unit was a step from the outbreak of World War III, but the situation calmed down and Fairbourn and his brigade sailed back to the United States in December 1962.

Fairbourn was appointed commanding general of 1st Marine Division in April 1963 and promoted to the rank of major general in August of that year. Fairbourn was relieved by his assistant division commander, brigadier general Edward H. Hurst in July 1965 and ordered to Washington, D.C., for duty as deputy director for Plans within Plans and Policy Directorate, Joint Chiefs of Staff under Admiral Tom Moorer.

Because of his radical about-face on the nuclear weapons issue, some of Fairbourn's comrades, including Joint Chiefs of Staff chairman Admiral Moorer, who say the retired general has simply "jumped from the frying pan into the fire". Fairbourn was ordered for temporary duty as special assistant to the chief of staff, Headquarters Marine Corps in August 1967 and promptly retired on September 1, 1967, after 32 years of active service.

Fairbourn later commented:

When I moved to the level of a high-level planner, I began dealing with the collateral effects of strategic nuclear war the number of people killed in a nuclear attack, the innocent bystanders. I revolted at that, but I lived with it until I "got out of the kitchen". Some of my colleagues respected my views, but they don't want to join me. They'd rather play golf. They've paid their dues. Now they want to take off their pack and relax.

== Retirement ==
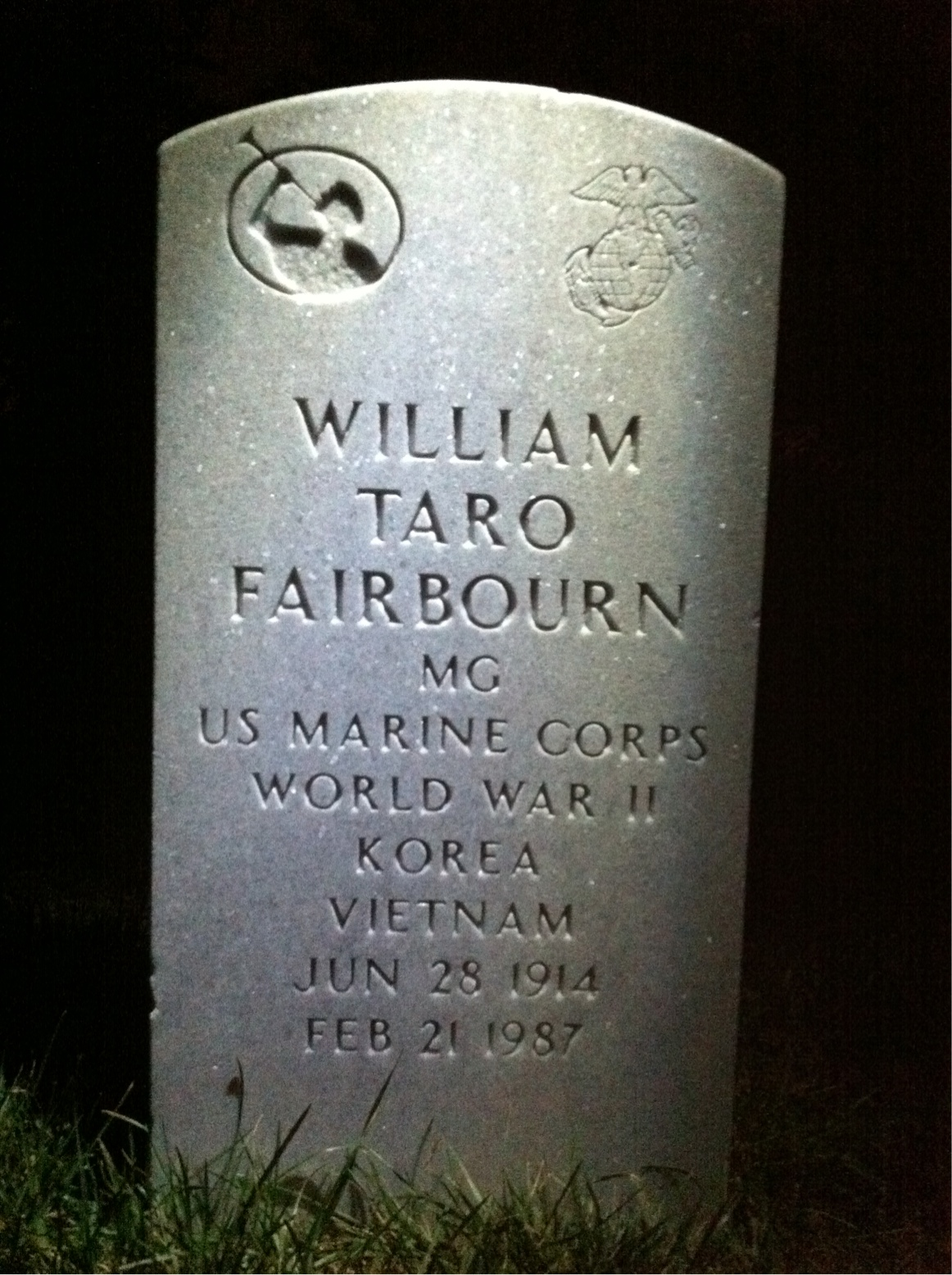
Grave of William T. Fairbourn at Arlington National Cemetery

Following his retirement from the military, Fairbourn toured the country warning of the dangers of nuclear war. He was also a member of the executive committee of Utahns Against the Nuclear Arms Race and associate director of the Center for Defense Information under retired rear admiral Gene La Rocque.

Fairbourn settled in Salt Lake City, Utah and died there on February 21, 1987. He is buried at Arlington National Cemetery, Virginia, together with his wife, Laura S. Fairbourn (1908–2002). They had one son, William Thomas Fairbourn, whom they adopted in 1947.

== Decorations ==
Here is the ribbon of Major General Fairbourn:

1st Row	Legion of Merit with Combat "V"	Bronze Star Medal with Combat "V" and one 5/16" Gold Star	Navy Presidential Unit Citation
2nd Row	Navy Unit Commendation	American Defense Service Medal with Fleet Clasp	Asiatic-Pacific Campaign Medal with one silver and two bronze 3/16 inch service stars
3rd Row	American Campaign Medal	World War II Victory Medal	National Defense Service Medal with one star

Military offices
Preceded by Herman Nickerson Jr.	Commanding General of 1st Marine Division; 1963–1965	Succeeded by Edward H. Hurst
Preceded by William W. Stickney	Director of Marine Corps Reserve; 1960–1962	Succeeded by Ronald R. Van Stockum
