= Henry Bertram (disambiguation) =

Henry Bertram (1825–1878) was a US general.

Henry Bertram may also refer to:

- Henry Bertram, a character in Guy Mannering
- Henry Bertram, the owner of Henry Bertram, Sr. House on National Register of Historic Places listings in Yamhill County, Oregon
- Henry Bertram, a Gestapo officer, see Sund Municipality in Norway

== See also ==
- Henry Bertram Price (1869–1941), Governor of Guam
- Harry Bertram (disambiguation)
