= Governor Price =

Governor Price may refer to:

- Henry Bertram Price (1869–1941), 30th Naval Governor of Guam
- James Hubert Price (1878–1943), 53rd Governor of Virginia
- John Giles Price (1808–1857), Governor of the convict settlement at Norfolk Island from 1846 to 1853
- Rodman M. Price (1816–1894), 17th Governor of New Jersey
- Sterling Price (1809–1867), 11th Governor of Missouri
