= Elizabeth Harrison Shapley =

American First Lady of Guam (1884–1938)

First Lady of Guam
- In role April 7, 1926 – June 11, 1929
- Governor: Lloyd Stowell Shapley

Personal details
- Born: Elizabeth Harrison McCormick; February 11, 1884 New York City, New York, U.S.
- Died: August 7, 1938 (aged 54) California, U.S.
- Spouse(s): Charles Frederick Herreshoff, Lloyd Stowell Shapley
- Children: 3
- Relatives: Alan Shapley (son)
- Occupation: First Lady of Guam
- Other names: Elizabeth H. McCormick, Elizabeth McCormick, Elizabeth Harrison McCormick Herrshoff, Elizabeth H. Shapley, Elizabeth Shapley

Elizabeth Harrison Shapley was an American former First Lady of Guam.

== Early life ==
On February 11, 1884, Shapley was born as Elizabeth Harrison McCormick in New York City, New York.

== Career ==
In 1926, when Lloyd Stowell Shapley was appointed the military Governor of Guam, Shapley became the First Lady of Guam on April 7, 1926, until June 11, 1929.

== Personal life ==
On April 9, 1902, Shapley married Charles Frederick Herreshoff, who later became an automobile designer/manufacturer and an architect. Shapeley's full name became Elizabeth Harrison McCormick Herrshoff.

On August 1, 1912, Shapley divorced Charles Frederick Herreshoff.

On November 6, 1912, on Mare Island in Vallejo, California, Shapley married Lloyd Stowell Shapley, who later became a United States Navy Captain and Military Governor of Guam. Shapley had three children from her previous marriage, Alan, Elizabeth Sult, and Sylvia.

Shapley's son Alan Shapley (1903-1973) became a Lieutenant General of the United States Marine Corps. He was a survivor of USS Arizona (BB-39).

On April 25, 1918, Shapley's daughter Elizabeth Harrison Shapley became a sponsor of USS Kilty (DD-137).

On August 7, 1938, Shapley died in California.
