= Alfred Winsor Brown =

Captain Alfred Winsor Brown

31st Naval Governor of Guam
- In office August 26, 1924 – August 7, 1926
- Preceded by: Henry Bertram Price
- Succeeded by: Lloyd Stogell Shapley

Personal details
- Born: November 6, 1885 Chelsea, Massachusetts, U.S.
- Died: September 7, 1938 (aged 52) Long Beach, California, U.S.
- Resting place: Arlington National Cemetery
- Spouse: Marguerite Boynton Brown
- Education: United States Naval Academy
- Awards: Mexican Service Medal; World War I Victory Medal; Order of Abdon Calderon

Military service
- Allegiance: United States
- Branch/service: United States Navy
- Years of service: 1903–1938
- Rank: Captain
- Commands: USS Tingey; USS Whitney; Portsmouth Naval Shipyard; USS Arizona
- Battles/wars: World War I

Alfred Winsor Brown II (November 6, 1885 – September 7, 1938) was a United States Navy captain who served as the 31st naval governor of Guam. He graduated from the United States Naval Academy in 1907, serving aboard a number of ships in many different capacities soon after. He returned to the academy on staff before serving as the first commanding officer of USS Tingey. From 1924 to 1926, he served as Guamanian governor before attending the Naval War College and serving on the staff of a number of high-ranking naval officers. He then served as commanding officer of USS Whitney and the Portsmouth Naval Shipyard. Soon after assuming command of USS Arizona, Brown died of a heart attack.

== Early life ==
On November 6, 1885, Brown was born as Alfred Winsor Brown, II in Chelsea, Massachusetts. Brown's father was Alfred Winsor Brown, I (1857–1922). Brown's mother was Meribah Tallman (née Josselyn) Brown (1855–1939).

== Career ==
Brown entered the United States Naval Academy in 1903, graduating in 1907. In 1906, he began service aboard USS Georgia, transferring to Asiatic Squadron and the USS Rhode Island until 1912. In 1914, he transferred to USS Vermont before becoming navigator aboard USS Baltimore. For 1916, he served as executive officer aboard USS Paducah.

In 1917, Brown returned to the Naval Academy as a staff member.

On July 25, 1919, USS Tingey launched with Brown in command and served with the Pacific Fleet. He was stationed at the Puget Sound Naval Shipyard and Intermediate Maintenance Facility from 1923 until August 1924.

Brown then served as Governor of Guam from August 26, 1924, to August 7, 1926. While still a governor, from 1925 Brown was also a member and recorder of the Board of Inspection and Survey.

From 1930 to 1931, Brown attended the Naval War College, after which he served in the office of the Assistant Secretary of the Navy and the office of the Chief of Naval Operations. He became commanding officer of USS Whitney in 1932. From 1935 to 1937, he served as commander of the Portsmouth Naval Shipyard, before being appointed commander of USS Arizona in 1937.

During his career, he earned three medals: the Mexican Service Medal, the World War I Victory Medal, and the Order of Abdon Calderon.

== Personal life ==
In 1912, Brown married Marguerite Boynton. They had four children, Alfred Winsor Brown Jr., Barbara Brown, Jean Brown, and Mary Boynton Brown.

On September 7, 1938, Brown died of a heart attack in an apartment hotel in Long Beach, California. Brown's funeral service took place aboard USS Arizona. Brown is interred at Arlington National Cemetery on September 14, 1938.

Military offices
Preceded by Henry Bertram Price	Naval Governor of Guam; 1924–1926	Succeeded by Lloyd Stowell Shapley
