= William W. Stickney (USMC) =

United States Marine Corps general

William Wallace Stickney
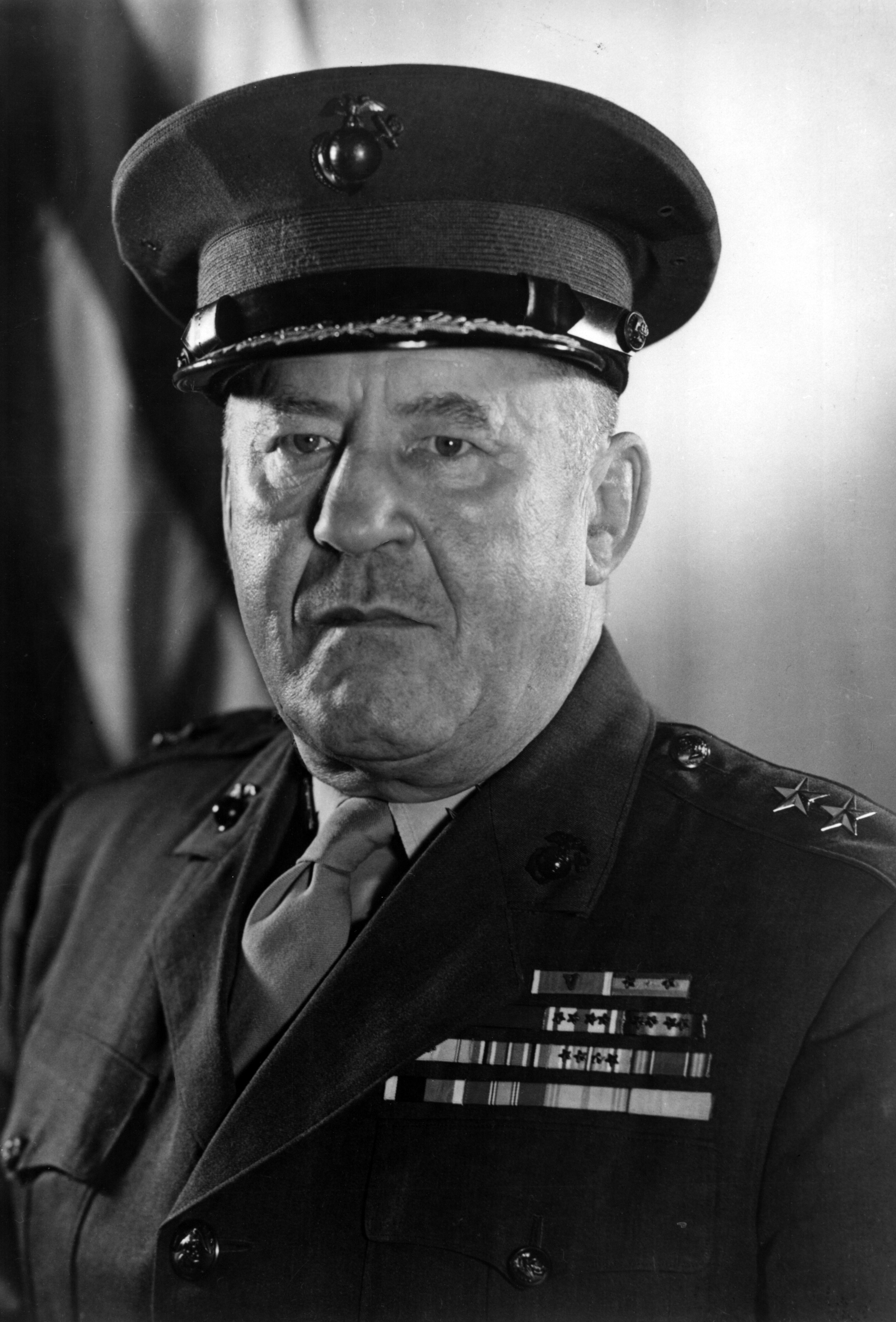
- MG William W. Stickney, USMC
- Born: May 16, 1899; New York City, US
- Died: March 1, 1980 (aged 80); Bethesda, Maryland, US
- Burial place: Arlington National Cemetery
- Military career
- Allegiance: United States of America
- Branch: United States Marine Corps
- Service years: 1917–1919; 1940–1946; 1952–1960
- Rank: Major general
- Service number: 0-4563
- Commands: Marine Corps Reserve; 2nd Battalion, 1st Marines
- Conflicts: World War I World War II: Battle of Guadalcanal; Battle of the Tenaru; Battle of Cape Gloucester
- Awards: Legion of Merit with Combat "V"
- Other work: Lawyer

William Wallace Stickney (May 16, 1899 – March 1, 1980) was an American lawyer, SEC official and decorated officer of the United States Marine Corps with the rank of major general. He spent most of his Marine career as reserve officer, but was recalled to active duty during World War II and subsequently remained on active service as director of Marine Corps Reserve.

== Early life ==
William Wallace Stickney was born on May 16, 1899, as the son of Henry Elmer Stickney. He attended Colby Academy in New London, New Hampshire, until November 1917, when he enlisted in the United States Navy as Seaman Second Class. Stickney served aboard submarine chasers and destroyers and took part in the several naval campaigns. He was decorated with Navy Good Conduct Medal for his enlisted service and discharged from the navy on June 24, 1919. Stickney then completed his education at Vermont Academy in Saxtons River, Vermont, graduating in summer 1922.

Stickney then attended Dartmouth College in Hanover, New Hampshire, with graduation in 1926 and subsequently studied law at National University in Washington, D.C, where received Bachelor of Laws degree.

He then pursued a career in the legal branch and worked as an assistant clerk of the Supreme Court of the District of Columbia and additionally wrote columns for the Washington Times Herald. Stickney then received a law degree in December 1930 and practiced law before the Supreme court of the District of Columbia and also Supreme Court of the United States.

Between years 1931 and 1935, Stickney was trial attorney and litigation counsel for the National Recovery Administration and then practiced private law office until 1940.

Like many veterans of World War I, Stickney entered the Marine Corps Reserve and was commissioned second lieutenant on June 5, 1930. He was attached to the 5th Marine Reserve Battalion in Washington, D.C., and during next years, took part in many exercises with his unit. Stickney was promoted to the rank of captain in July 1935 and later took part in the 1938 Caribbean Maneuvers with 1st Marine Brigade under the command of Brigadier General Richard P. Williams. Stickney was later promoted to the rank of major in July 1939 and appointed executive officer of 5th Reserve Battalion.

== World War II ==
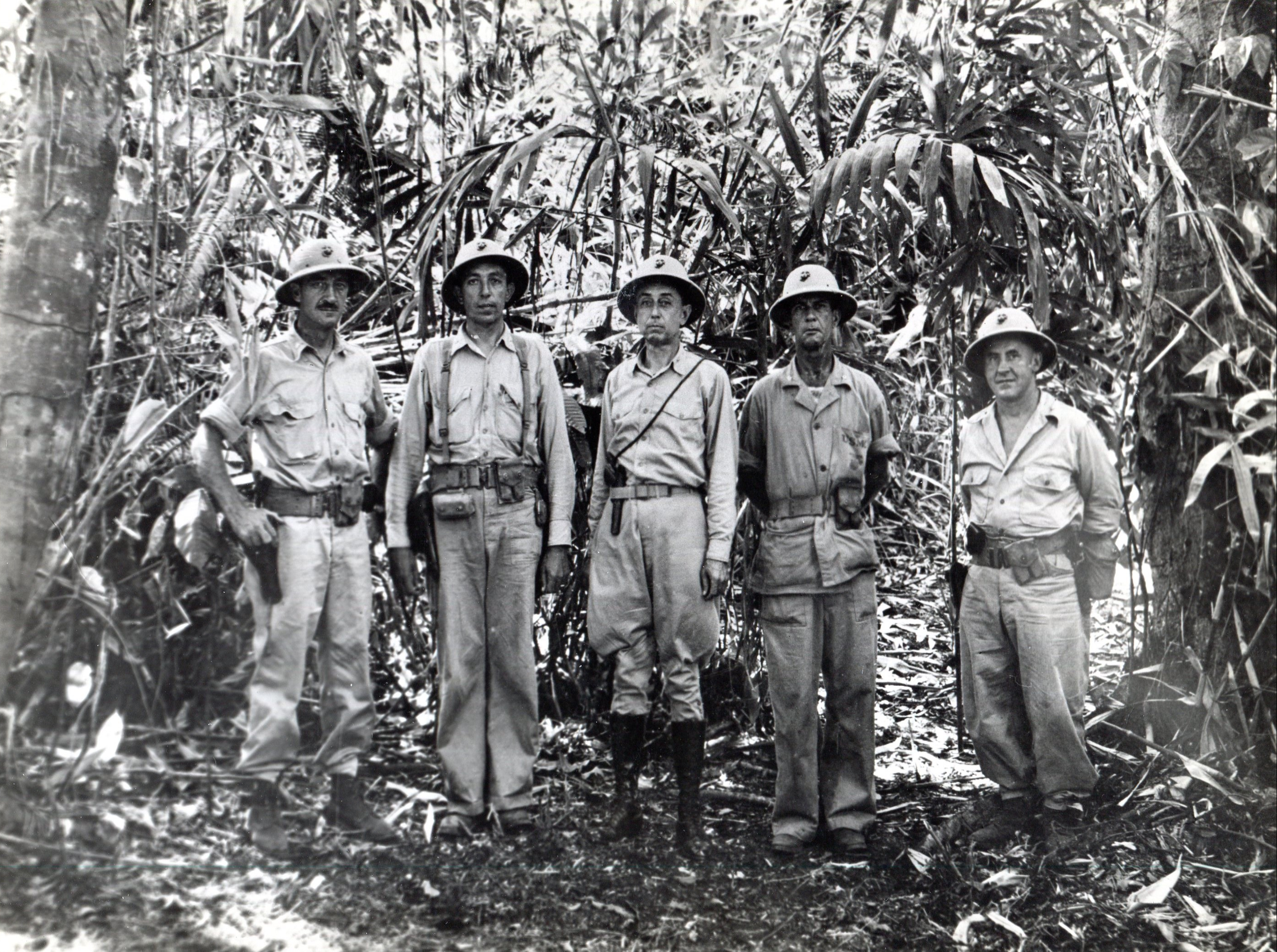
From left to right: Lieutenant Colonel Leonard B. Cresswell (1st Battalion), Lieutenant Colonel Edwin A. Pollock (Executive Officer 1st Marines), Colonel Clifton B. Cates (Commanding Officer 1st Marines), Lieutenant colonel William N. McKelvy (3rd Battalion) and Lieutenant colonel William W. Stickney (2nd Battalion) on Guadalcanal, October 1942

With the worsening situation in the world, Stickney was recalled to active duty in November 1940 and ordered for additional training with his battalion to the Marine Corps Base Quantico, Virginia.

His unit subsequently sailed with 1st Marine Brigade for Guantanamo Bay, Cuba and Stickney served as executive officer of several battalions of the brigade. The 1st Brigade was redesignated 1st Marine Division in February 1941 and ordered back to the United States in April of that year. Stickney was then appointed executive officer of 1st Engineer Battalion within 1st Marine Division under Major General Holland Smith in May 1941 and took part in exercises at Camp Lejeune, North Carolina.

Following the Japanese Attack on Pearl Harbor, Stickney was appointed Operations Officer of 1st Marine Regiment under Colonel James F. Moriarty in February 1942 and finally embarked for Pacific area in June of that year. After a brief period on New Zealand, Stickney landed with his regiment on Guadalcanal during the beginning of August 1942.

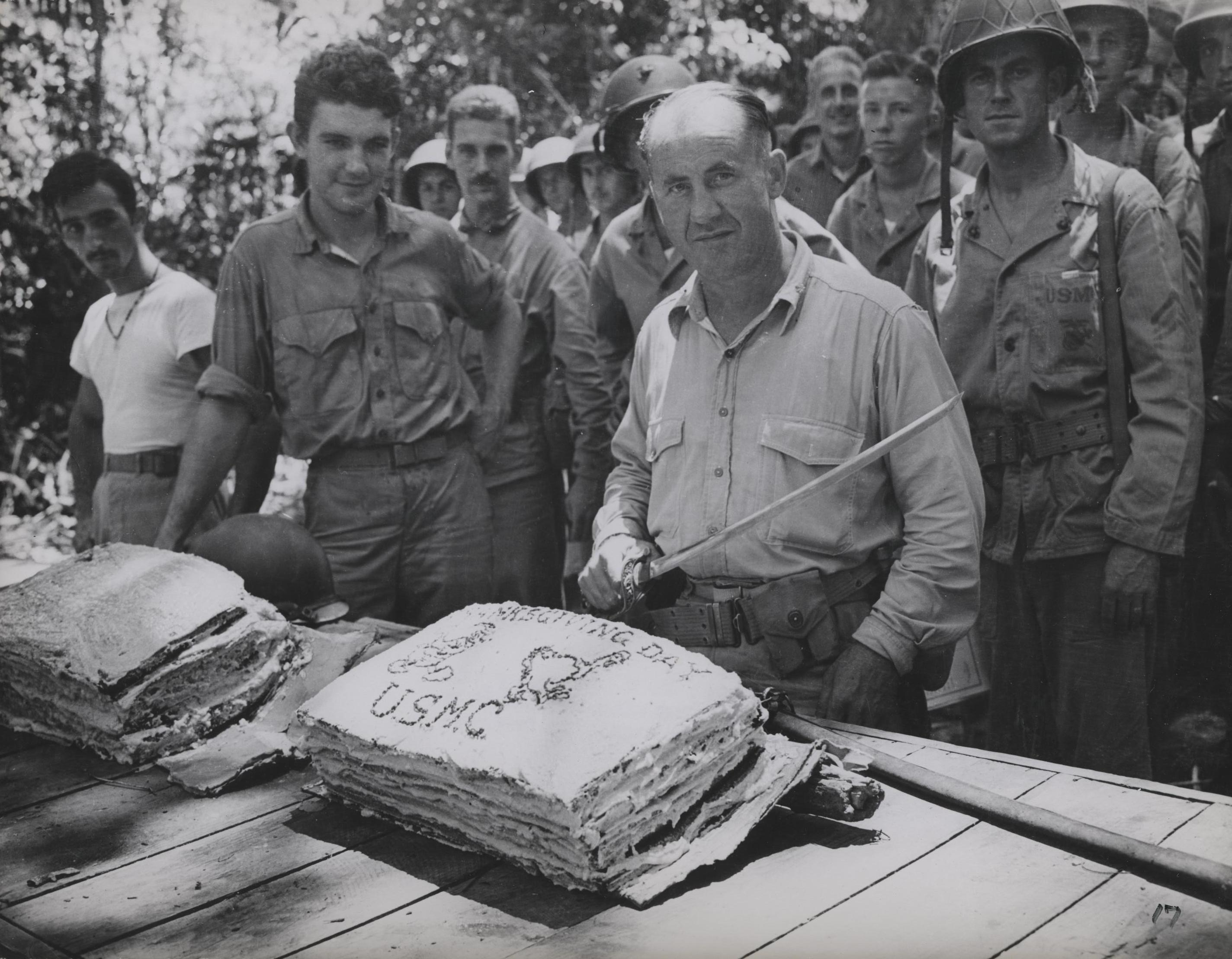
Lt. Colonel William W. Stickney cuts a Thanksgiving cake with a Japanese officer's sword at Guadalcanal, as hungry Leathernecks look on.

He was promoted to the rank of lieutenant colonel in September of that year and succeeded Edwin A. Pollock as commanding officer of 2nd Battalion, 1st Marines at the same time. Stickney led his battalion during the combats in October 1942 and repelled several Japanese attacks during counteroffensive. He led his unit for the rest of Guadalcanal campaign and embarked with his battalion for Australia in January 1943. For his service on Guadalcanal, Stickney was decorated with the Legion of Merit with Combat "V" for his leadership.

After eight months of rest and refit in Melbourne, Stickney was appointed 1st Marine Division Law Officer in August 1943. He took part in the small unit training on Goodenough Island, New Guinea at the beginning of October 1943. Stickney took part in the Battle of Cape Gloucester in December 1943 and January 1944 and retook command of 2nd Battalion, 1st Marines in April of that year.

He led his battalion to Pavuvu, Russell Islands for another rest and refit and subsequently left for United States in July 1944 after 26 months in Pacific. He then assumed duties as camp recreation and special service officer under Major General John Marston at Camp Lejeune, North Carolina. His main responsibilities were to establish, operate, or supervise the operation of rest camps and rest areas.

== Later career ==
Stickney was ordered back to the Pacific area in July 1945 and appointed Special Service Officer on the staff of V Amphibious Corps under Major General Harry Schmidt. For his new command, Stickney was promoted to the rank of colonel in August of that year and spent following six months with occupation duties in Japan. He sailed with V Amphibious Corps to the United States at the end of January 1946 and following the deactivation at Camp Pendleton in February 1946, Stickney was transferred to the staff of Marine Barracks, Washington, D.C.

He was released to inactive duty in May 1946 and assumed duties as Principal Attorney for the Division of Corporation Finance of the Securities and Exchange Commission. Stickney served in that capacity until June 1952, when he was recalled to extended active duty and appointed deputy director of Marine Corps Reserve under Major General John C. McQueen. He was promoted to the rank of brigadier general in September 1955 and served several times as temporary director of Marine Corps Reserve. Stickney was promoted to the rank of major general in October 1959 and assumed his final assignment as director of Marine Corps Reserve one month later.

Major General Stickney retired from the Marine Corps on January 1, 1960, after almost 32 years of active and reserve service. He settled in Bethesda, Maryland, where he died on heart failure on March 1, 1980. He was buried at Arlington National Cemetery, Virginia, together with his wife, Emma Lange Stickney.

== Decorations ==
This is the ribbon bar of Major General William W. Stickney:

1st Row	Legion of Merit with Combat "V"			
2nd Row	Navy Presidential Unit Citation with two stars	Navy Good Conduct Medal	Reserve Good Conduct Medal with four stars	World War I Victory Medal with four battle clasps
3rd Row	American Defense Service Medal with Base Clasp	American Campaign Medal	Asiatic-Pacific Campaign Medal with four 3/16" service stars	World War II Victory Medal
4th Row	Navy Occupation Service Medal	National Defense Service Medal	Armed Forces Reserve Medal	Marine Corps Reserve Ribbon

== See also ==
- Guadalcanal Campaign

Military offices
Preceded by Alan Shapley	Director of Marine Corps Reserve; November 1, 1959 - January 1, 1960	Succeeded by William T. Fairbourn
Preceded by Thomas G. Ennis	Director of Marine Corps Reserve; March 1, 1957 - July 22, 1957	Succeeded by Alan Shapley
Preceded by Joseph C. Burger	Director of Marine Corps Reserve; January 4, 1956 - March 11, 1956	Succeeded by Thomas G. Ennis
