= Charles F. Herreshoff =

American automobile designer and manufacturer

- Born: May 28, 1880; Nice, France
- Died: January 31, 1954 (aged 73); San Diego, California
- Spouse(s): Elizabeth Harrison McCormick Herreshoff, Edna May Burt Herreshoff

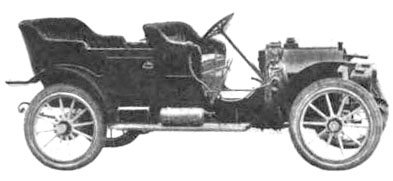
1910 Herreshoff Touring Car

Charles Frederick Herreshoff (her-res-hoff, no stressed syllable; May 28, 1880 – January 31, 1954) was an American automobile designer and manufacturer.

== Biography ==
On May 28, 1880, Herreshoff was born in Nice, France, while his parents, James Brown F. Herreshoff (1834–1930) and Jane Brown (maiden; 1855–1924), were vacationing. He apprenticed in the family boat works in Bristol, Rhode Island, and studied in Edinburgh and at the University of Glasgow, and in Germany.

== Personal life ==
On April 9, 1902, in Helensburgh, Scotland, Herreshoff married Elizabeth Harrison McCormick (maiden; 1884–1938). They had two children.

Herreshoff and McCormick divorced August 1, 1910, in Philadelphia.

In 1912, Herreshoff married Edna May Burt.

On January 31, 1954, Herreshoff died in San Diego, California. Herreshoff is interred in San Diego, California.

== Family ==
Herreshoff was married three times. His first marriage was a double-ring event. Elizabeth's sister, Minnie Isabelle McCormick (maiden; 1878–1962), in the same ceremony in Helensburgh at St Michael and All Angels' Church (de) (Scottish Episcopal), married Henry Miller Gleason (1876–1965), a 1902 graduate of the United States Naval Academy who went on to become a naval ship builder. McCormick remarried – on November 6, 1912, on Mare Island in Vallejo, California – to Lloyd Stowell Shapley (1875–1959).

Herreshoff, from his marriage to McCormick, was the biological the father of Lieutenant General Alan Shapley (né Alan Herreshoff; 1903–1973), late of the U.S. Marine Corps, who survived the sinking of the USS Arizona in the attack on Pearl Harbor. Charles Herreshoff's father, James Brown F. Herreshoff, was an American inventor and chemist. His uncle, Nathanael Greene Herreshoff (1848–1938), was an American naval architect and yacht design innovator. His cousin, L. Francis Herreshoff (1890–1972) (Nathanael's son), was a boat designer, naval architect, editor, and author of books and magazine articles. His cousin, Fred Herreshoff (1888–1920), was a national class amateur golfer.

One of Herreshoff's great-great grandfathers, John Brown I (1736–1803) was an American merchant, enslaver, statesman from Providence, Rhode Island and – with his brothers, Nicholas (1729–1791), Joseph (1733–1785), and Moses Brown (1738–1836), an abolitionist – was instrumental in founding Brown University.

== See also ==
- Herreshoff (automobile)
