= Alan Shapley =

US Marine Corps general (1903–1973)

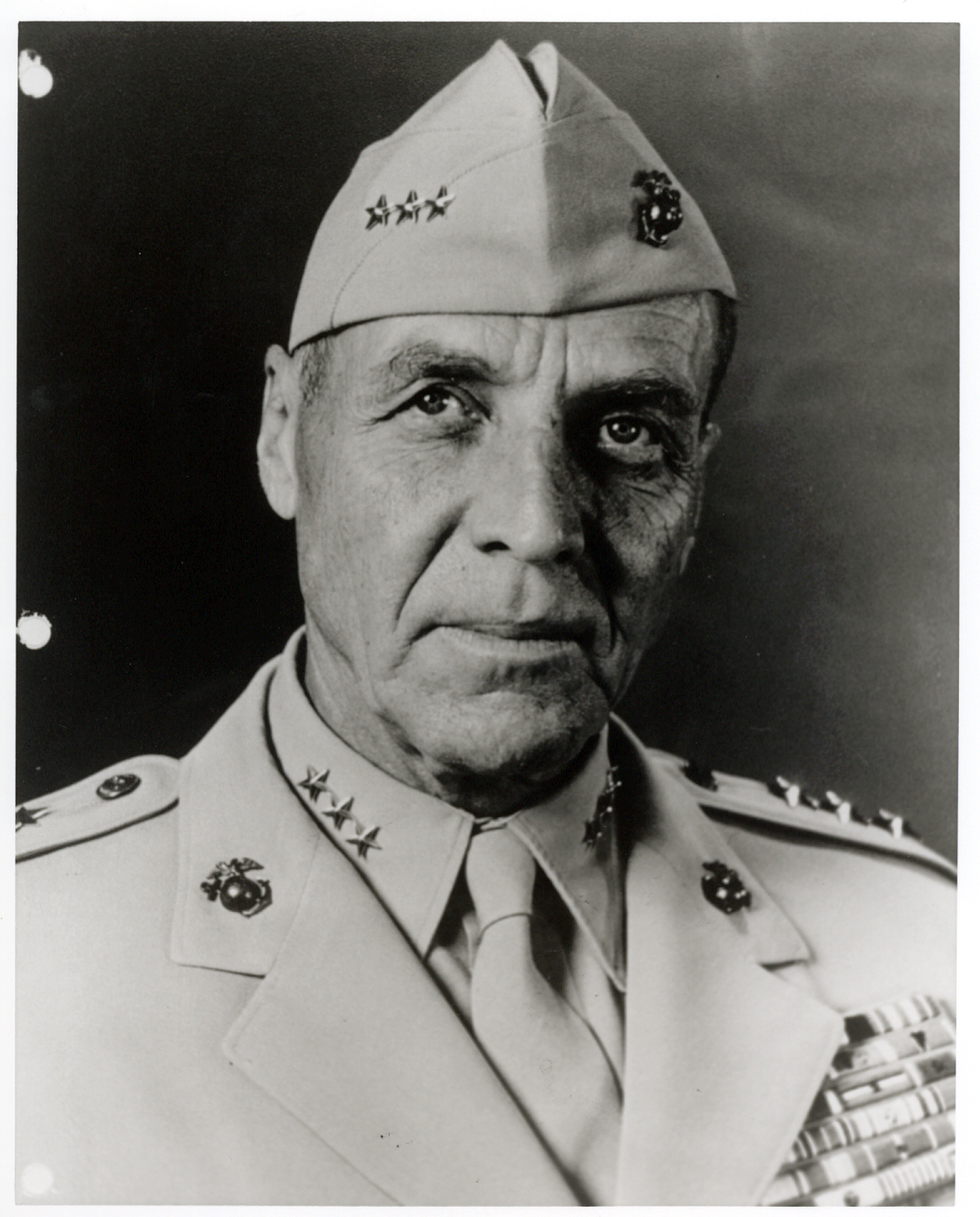
- Lt.Gen. Alan Shapley
- Born: February 9, 1903; New York City, New York, U.S.
- Died: May 13, 1973 (aged 70); Bethesda, Maryland, U.S.
- Military career
- Allegiance: United States
- Branch: United States Marine Corps
- Service years: 1927–1962
- Rank: Lieutenant General
- Service number: 0-4272
- Commands: Fleet Marine Force Pacific; Camp Pendleton; Marine Corps Reserve; 3rd Marine Division; 4th Marine Regiment; 2nd Marine Raider Battalion
- Conflicts: World War II: Attack on Pearl Harbor; Battle of Bougainville; Battle of Guam; Battle of Okinawa; Korean War
- Awards: Navy Cross; Silver Star; Legion of Merit (2); Bronze Star Medal

Lieutenant General Alan Shapley (né Alan Herreshoff; February 9, 1903 – May 13, 1973) was a senior officer in the United States Marine Corps who served with distinction in both World War II and the Korean War. He is notably recognized for his heroism in action as the commander of the Marine Detachment aboard the USS Arizona during the attack on Pearl Harbor on December 7, 1941, and his subsequent valorous actions in the Pacific Theater. Shapley was awarded the Silver Star for his gallantry on the during the sinking of the Arizona; and later received the Navy Cross for extraordinary heroism during the Battle of Guam. His final assignment was as the commanding general of the Fleet Marine Force, Pacific.

A graduate of the United States Naval Academy, Shapley excelled in athletics, competing in football, basketball, and track. Throughout his military career, he remained involved in sports, playing and coaching the All-Marine Corps football teams in 1927 and 1928, refereeing U.S. Fleet boxing events for three years, and playing and/or coaching football, basketball, baseball, and boxing at various duty stations before World War II.

== Early life ==
Alan Herreshoff was born on February 9, 1903, in Manhattan, New York, to Charles Frederick Herreshoff (1876–1954) and Elizabeth Harrison McCormick (1886–1938). His parents divorced on August 1, 1912, in Philadelphia. Later that year, on November 6, 1912, his mother married Lloyd Stowell Shapley (1875–1959), a naval officer who would eventually serve as the 26th Naval Governor of Guam from April 7, 1926, to June 11, 1929. After the marriage, Alan took the surname Shapley.

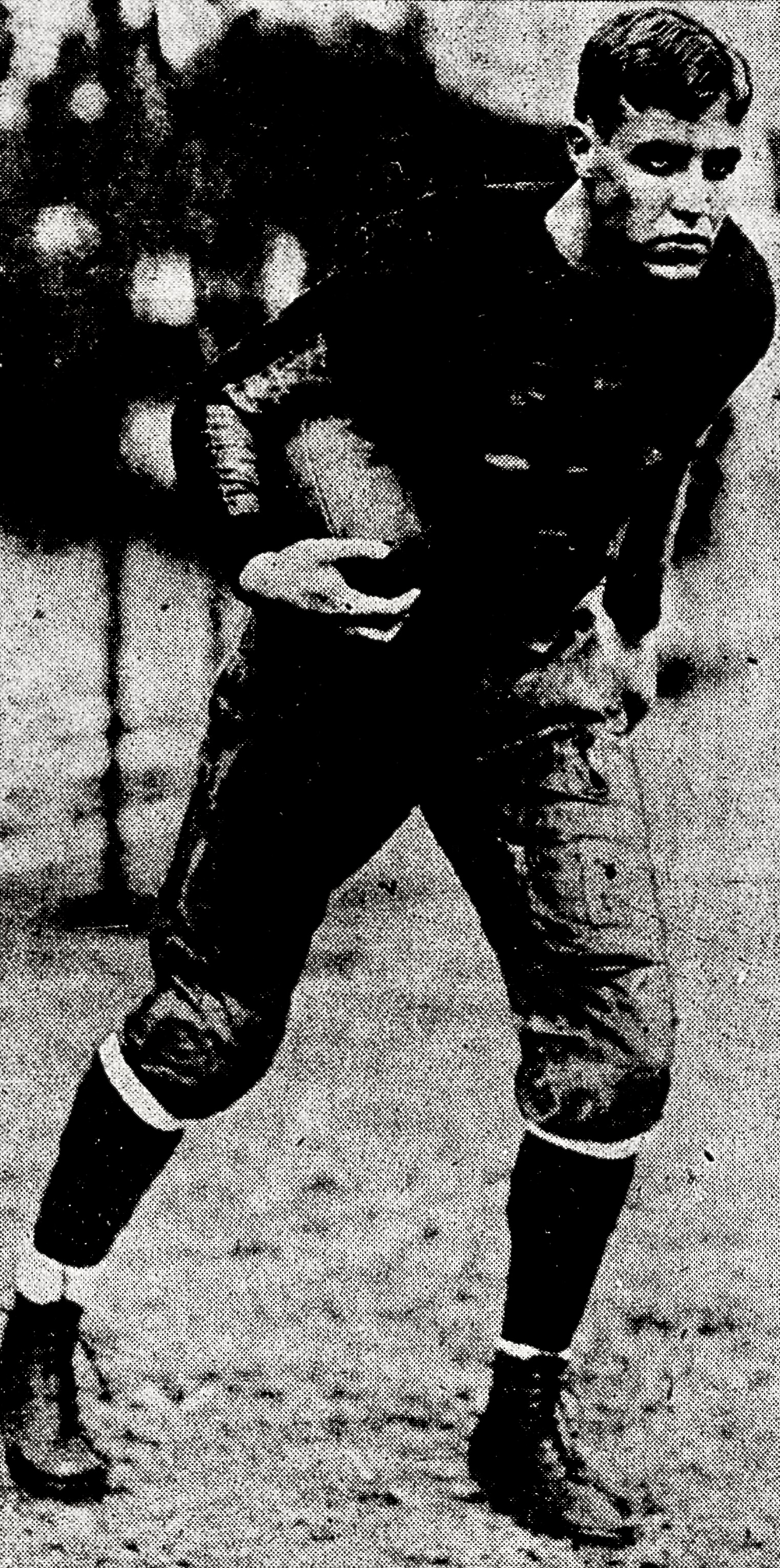
Shapley playing college football with the Navy Midshipmen team

Shapley’s early education took place in Vallejo, California. He graduated from the Peddie School in Hightstown, New Jersey, in 1922. He then entered the United States Naval Academy, where he distinguished himself as a star football player on the Navy Midshipmen team. Upon graduating on June 2, 1927, he was commissioned as a second lieutenant in the United States Marine Corps.

== Marine Corps career ==
After further training at the U.S. Naval Academy and duty at Quantico, Virginia, 2nd Lt Shapley completed the Marine officers' Basic School at the Philadelphia Navy Yard. In January 1929, he was assigned to the Marine Barracks at Pearl Harbor, Hawaii, where he served for nearly three years. Shapley returned to the United States in October 1931 and held various positions at Marine Corps bases in San Diego, California. In January 1934, he assumed command of the Marine Detachment aboard the USS San Francisco and was promoted to first lieutenant that same month. After being detached from the San Francisco in June 1936, he returned to Quantico, Virginia, where he served as aide-de-camp to the commanding general of the Marine Barracks. He was promoted to captain in July 1936.

In June 1937, Capt Shapley entered the Junior Course at the Marine Corps Schools in Quantico and completed the course in May 1938. He was then assigned to San Francisco, California as aide-de-camp to the commanding general of the Department of the Pacific, a position he held until July 1939. Following this assignment, he served as the Operations, Training, and Intelligence Officer for the Department of the Pacific until May 1940. In June 1940, he transferred to Hawaii, where he took command of the Marine Detachment aboard the USS Arizona. Shapley was promoted to major in August 1941.

=== World War II ===
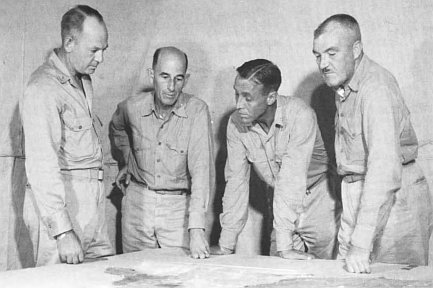
Lemuel C. Shepherd (left) speaks with members of his staff during a planning meeting prior to the Guam operation. Next to him is 1st Brigade Chief of Staff John T. Walker, Alan Shapley (4th Marines) and Merlin F. Schneider (22nd Marines).

On December 7, 1941, Major Shapley was the senior marine on board the USS Arizona in Pearl Harbor. The previous day, he had been relieved as detachment commander, but had stayed on the ship to play on the ship's baseball team's scheduled game against the Enterprise team. When a torpedo hit the port bow of the Arizona, Shapley was thrown from the foremast at least 100 feet through the air into the water; he was able to swim to Ford Island and to rescue two shipmates along the way. He was one of eight Marine Corps survivors from the Arizona, becoming the ranking Marine Corps officer in the Pacific at the time. For his gallantry on that day, he was awarded the Silver Star.

Two days after the attack on Pearl Harbor, Shapley sailed for San Diego to become personnel officer to the Amphibious Corps, Pacific Fleet. He was promoted to lieutenant colonel in August 1942.

Lieutenant Colonel Shapley assumed a similar post with I Marine Amphibious Corps in October 1942, and that same month he sailed with the 1st Corps for the Pacific area. Shapley was the commanding officer of the 2nd Marine Raider Battalion from March 22, 1943, to August 30, 1943. He then commanded the 2nd Marine Raider Regiment (Provisional), which included the 2nd Raider Battalion, in the fighting at Bougainville, earning the Legion of Merit with Combat "V" for outstanding service at Bougainville in November 1943.

After the Bougainville campaign, Shapley organized the new Fourth Marines from the disbanded Raider battalions, which he commanded at Emirau, Guam, and Okinawa.

Shapley was awarded the Navy Cross for extraordinary heroism as a lieutenant colonel, commanding the Fourth Marines (Reinforced) on Guam from July 21 to August 10, 1944. His Navy Cross citation states in part:

Courageously leading his regiment in an assault landing against strong enemy beach defenses, Lieutenant Colonel Shapely rapidly seized the assigned beachhead and defended the area against fanatical hostile counterattacks. Upon relief of the force beachhead line, he valiantly led his troops in a determined assault upon the left half of the Orote Peninsula and, despite the difficult terrain and strong enemy defenses, seized an important enemy airfield and annihilated the Japanese in that area. Vigorously patrolling in the southern half of the island to eliminate hostile elements there, he then directed his men in the vital attack on the northern half of the island…

During the Battle of Okinawa, Colonel Shapley lead the 4th Marines in the capture of Naha airfield. He was awarded a second Legion of Merit with Combat "V" for outstanding service at Okinawa from April to June 1945. He was promoted to colonel in November 1944.

=== After World War II ===
Following the Okinawa campaign, Colonel Shapley has been relieved by Lt. Col. Fred D. Beans and ordered back to the United States in July 1945 to become Assistant Inspector in the Inspection Division at Marine Corps Headquarters, Washington, D.C. In that capacity, he accompanied Admiral William F. Halsey on an official goodwill tour of Central and South America from June to August 1946, receiving decorations from Chile and Peru during that assignment. In September he entered the National War College in Washington.

After graduation from the War College in June 1947, Colonel Shapley served for two years at Norfolk, Virginia, as assistant chief of staff, G-3 (Operations and Training), of Fleet Marine Force, Atlantic. Subsequently, he was ordered to Marine Corps Recruit Depot San Diego in June 1949, and after serving as personnel officer of the depot, became its chief of staff in September 1949.

In January 1951, Colonel Shapley was ordered again to Washington where he served on the International Planning Staff of the Standing Group, North Atlantic Treaty Organization, until June 1953.

=== Korean War ===
In 1953 Shapley was ordered to Korea; he served as chief of staff, 1st Marine Division, earning the Bronze Star with Combat "V" for meritorious achievement during this period. For subsequent service as senior advisor to the Korean Marine Corps, he was awarded the Republic of Korea's Ulchi Medal with Silver Star.

=== 1954 to retirement ===
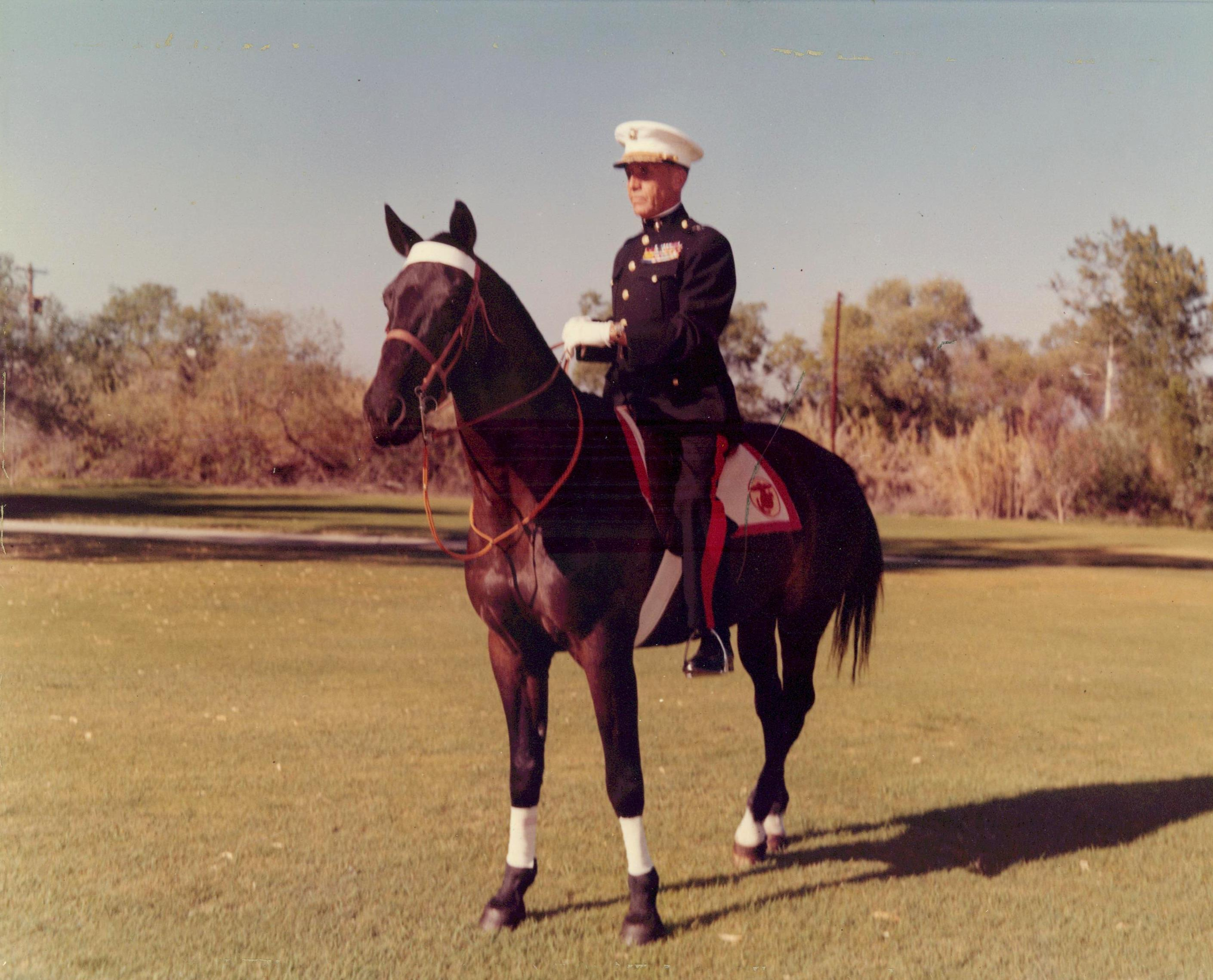
Alan Shapley, circa 1959.

From Korea Shapley was ordered to Japan in May 1954. He served there as commanding officer and, subsequently, commanding general, Troop Training Team, Amphibious Group, Western Pacific. He was promoted to brigadier general in July 1954.

In July 1955, on his return to the United States, Shapley became assistant commander of the 1st Marine Division, Marine Corps Base Camp Pendleton, California. Following his detachment from the 1st Division in May 1956, he commanded the Recruit Training Command at Marine Corps Recruit Depot San Diego for a brief time prior to being ordered to the Far East. Upon his promotion to major general in September 1956, he assumed duties on Okinawa as commanding general, 3rd Marine Division, Fleet Marine Force.

Shapley returned to the United States in July 1957, reporting to Headquarters Marine Corps, Washington, as director of the Marine Corps Reserve. After holding this post for over two years, he returned to the West Coast in November 1959, and served as commanding general, Marine Corps Base Camp Pendleton, until March 1961. He was promoted to his final rank of lieutenant general in April 1961 upon assuming duties as commanding general, Fleet Marine Force, Pacific, with headquarters at Camp H.M. Smith, Hawaii, and served in this capacity until his retirement on July 1, 1962.

Following his retirement from the military, Shapley taught at Bullis School, then located in Silver Spring, Maryland. Founded by Naval Commander William F. Bullis in 1930, Bullis School was originally a prep school for young men seeking acceptance to the United States Naval Academy.

=== Medals and decorations ===
Shapley's medals and decorations include:

1st Row	Navy Cross		Silver Star	
2nd Row	Legion of Merit w/ 1 award star & valor device	Bronze Star w/ valor device	Navy Commendation Medal	Navy Presidential Unit Citation with one star
3rd Row	Navy Unit Commendation w/ 2 service stars	American Defense Service Medal w/ Fleet clasp	American Campaign Medal	Asiatic-Pacific Campaign Medal w/ 5 service stars
4th Row	World War II Victory Medal	National Defense Service Medal	Korean Service Medal w/ 1 service star	Chilian Al Merito, Commander
5th Row	Peruvian Orden Militar de Ayacucho, Commander	Order of Military Merit, Eulji Cordon Medal	Korean Presidential Unit Citation	United Nations Korea Medal

== Personal life ==
Shapley died from a lung tumor on May 13, 1973, at the National Naval Medical Center in Bethesda, Maryland, at age 70.

== Additional sources ==
- "Lieutenant General Alan Shapley, USMC". Who's Who in Marine Corps History. History Division, United States Marine Corps. Archived from the original on May 16, 2011.
- Camp, Dick. "And the Band Played On: Marine Detachment, USS Arizona". Leatherneck Magazine: 43. Archived from the original on September 29, 2007.
- Camp, Dick (2006). Battleship Arizona's Marines At War: Making the Ultimate Sacrifice, December 7, 1941. Zeith Press. ISBN 0-7603-2717-3.
- Cressman, Robert J.; Wenger, J. Michael (1992). Infamous Day: Marines at Pearl Harbor, December 7, 1941. Marines in World War II Commemorative Series. Marine Corps Historical Center, United States Marine Corps. ISBN 0-16-037819-2.

Military offices
Preceded by Thomas A. Wornham	Commanding General of the Fleet Marine Force Pacific; 1961–1962	Succeeded by Carson Roberts
Preceded by Reginald H. Ridgely Jr.	Commanding General of the Camp Pendleton; 1959–1961	Succeeded by Raymond L. Murray
Preceded by William W. Stickney	Director of Marine Corps Reserve; 1957–1959	Succeeded by William W. Stickney
Preceded by Victor H. Krulak	Commanding General of 3rd Marine Division; 1956–1957	Succeeded by Francis M. McAlister
