= Fred D. Beans =

United States Marine Corps general

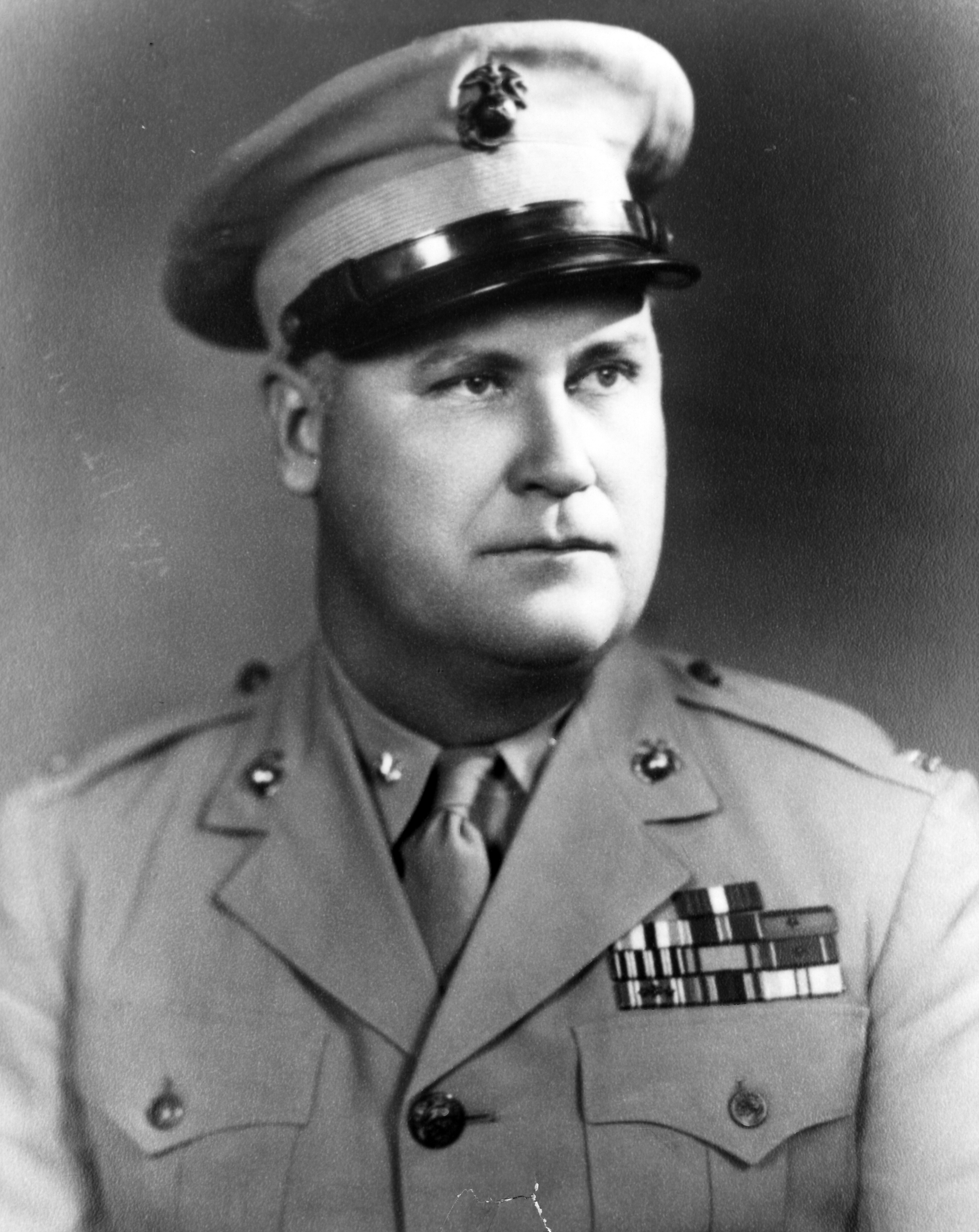
- Beans as lieutenant colonel, USMC
- Born: November 3, 1906; Skidmore, Kansas, US
- Died: September 13, 1980 (aged 73); Annapolis, Maryland, US
- Burial place: United States Naval Academy Cemetery
- Relatives: Brigadier General James D. Beans (son)
- Military career
- Allegiance: United States
- Branch: United States Marine Corps
- Service years: 1924–1948
- Rank: Brigadier general
- Service number: 0-4532
- Commands: 4th Marine Regiment; 3rd Marine Raider Battalion
- Conflicts: Banana Wars; Nicaraguan Campaign; Yangtze Patrol; World War II; Bougainville Campaign; Landings at Cape Torokina; Battle of Okinawa
- Awards: Navy Cross; Silver Star; Bronze Star Medal

Fred Dale Beans (November 3, 1906 – September 13, 1980) was a decorated officer of the United States Marine Corps with the rank of brigadier general, who is most noted as commanding officer of the 3rd Marine Raider Battalion during the Bougainville Campaign. He was the father of James D. Beans, who also served in the marines and rose to the rank of brigadier general.

== Early career ==
Fred Dale Beans was born on November 3, 1906, in Skidmore, Kansas, but he moved with his family to Mineral Wells, Texas, and later to Dallas. After graduating from Bryant Street High School in 1921, Beans worked as electrician for some time, before he enlisted in the United States Navy as a seaman apprentice in January 1924. Following two years of enlisted service, he was recommended by his superiors to the United States Naval Academy in Annapolis, Maryland, where he began his studies in June 1926.

During his studies at the Naval Academy, Beans played for Navy Midshipmen football and also for the Navy Midshipmen men's lacrosse team. He finally graduated on June 5, 1930, and was commissioned as a second lieutenant in the Marine Corps on the same date. As any other newly commissioned officer, he was sent for further officer training to the Basic School at Philadelphia Navy Yard. Beans graduated from the school during the following summer and was subsequently sent within expeditionary forces to Nicaragua to fight rebel forces. He distinguished himself during his service there and received Nicaraguan Cross of Valor with Diploma.

Upon his return to the United States, Beans was promoted to the rank of first lieutenant on May 29, 1934, and assigned to the Marine detachment aboard the cruiser USS Tuscaloosa. Beans was ordered for instruction to Army Infantry School at Fort Benning and graduated in June 1937. He was promoted to the rank of captain on June 30, 1937, and assigned to the 6th Marine Regiment for expeditionary duties in China. Beans was stationed in Shanghai and participated in the defense of the International Settlement during the Second Sino-Japanese War.

== World War II ==
At the time of the Japanese Attack on Pearl Harbor, Beans served briefly with 2nd Defense Battalion on Hawaii, before he was transferred to the 8th Marine Regiment and sailed to South Pacific. He was promoted to the rank of major on April 29, 1942, and subsequently to the temporary rank of lieutenant colonel on August 7, 1942. Beans also received the Bronze Star Medal for his service during the early Pacific service.

Lieutenant Colonel Beans was transferred to the command of the 3rd Marine Raider Battalion on June 16, 1943, and subsequently participated in the Bougainville Campaign. He led his battalion during the Landings at Cape Torokina on November 9, 1943. Beans participated in the landing and while his men were pinned down by enemy fire, he didn't hesitate move his command post to the front lines and without regard for his own personal safety, rallied his men and immediately launched a counterattack. He remained in the front line area for next eight hours and drove enemy out from its position with inflicting heavy losses on his side. For his inspiring leadership, courage and intrepid fighting spirit, Beans was decorated with the Navy Cross.

The Marine Raiders program was terminated in January 1944, and Beans was subsequently transferred back to the United States. He served for a brief period in San Diego and then also in Washington, D.C., at Headquarters Marine Corps, before the Marine Raiders Battalions were used to reestablish the 4th Marine Regiment. Beans was appointed Regiment's executive officer under Colonel Alan Shapley in September 1944 and later participated in the Okinawa campaign in April 1945.

When the commanding officer of the 1st Battalion, Major Bernard W. Green, was killed in action, Beans took over the command of the badly shaken battalion and accomplished the mission of capturing the enemy bastion of Mount Yaedake. For this act of leadership and valor, he was decorated with the Silver Star.

== Later career ==
Finally at the beginning of July 1945, Colonel Shapley was ordered back to the United States and Beans was appointed as the new commanding officer of the 4th Marine Regiment. He led the regiment during the Occupation of Japan and returned to the United States in March 1946. His last assignment was with G-3 section (operations) within Division of Plans and Policies at Headquarters Marine Corps. While served in this capacity, Beans was promoted to the rank of colonel on January 1, 1948.

However bad health forced him to retire, as he did on July 1, 1948. Following his retirement, Beans was advanced to the rank of brigadier general on the retired list for having been specially commended in combat. For his service at Headquarters Marine Corps, he received the Navy Commendation Medal.

During his civilian life, Beans settled in Annapolis, Maryland, and established and operated his own construction company. He was also a member of the Annapolis Yacht Club. Beans died of a heart attack on September 13, 1980, in Anne Arundel Medical Center in Annapolis. He is buried at United States Naval Academy Cemetery together with both of his wives, Elizabeth G. Stehle and Martha B. White. He had two children from his first marriage: a daughter, Arden Parsons Beans, and a son, James D. Beans, who also served in the Marine Corps as noted above.

== Decorations ==
Here is the ribbon bar of Brigadier General Fred D. Beans:

| 1st Row | Navy Cross | | | |
| 2nd Row | Silver Star | Bronze Star Medal with Combat "V" | Navy Commendation Medal | Navy Presidential Unit Citation with one star |
| 3rd Row | Second Nicaraguan Campaign Medal | China Service Medal | American Defense Service Medal with Base Clasp | Asiatic-Pacific Campaign Medal with three 3/16 inch service stars |
| 4th Row | American Campaign Medal | World War II Victory Medal | Navy Occupation Service Medal | Nicaraguan Cross of Valor with Diploma |

Military offices
| Preceded by Alan Shapley | Commanding Officer of the 4th Marine Regiment; 1945–1946 | Succeeded by Lawrence H. Cuthart Jr. |
