= USS Tingey (DD-272) =

Clemson-class destroyer

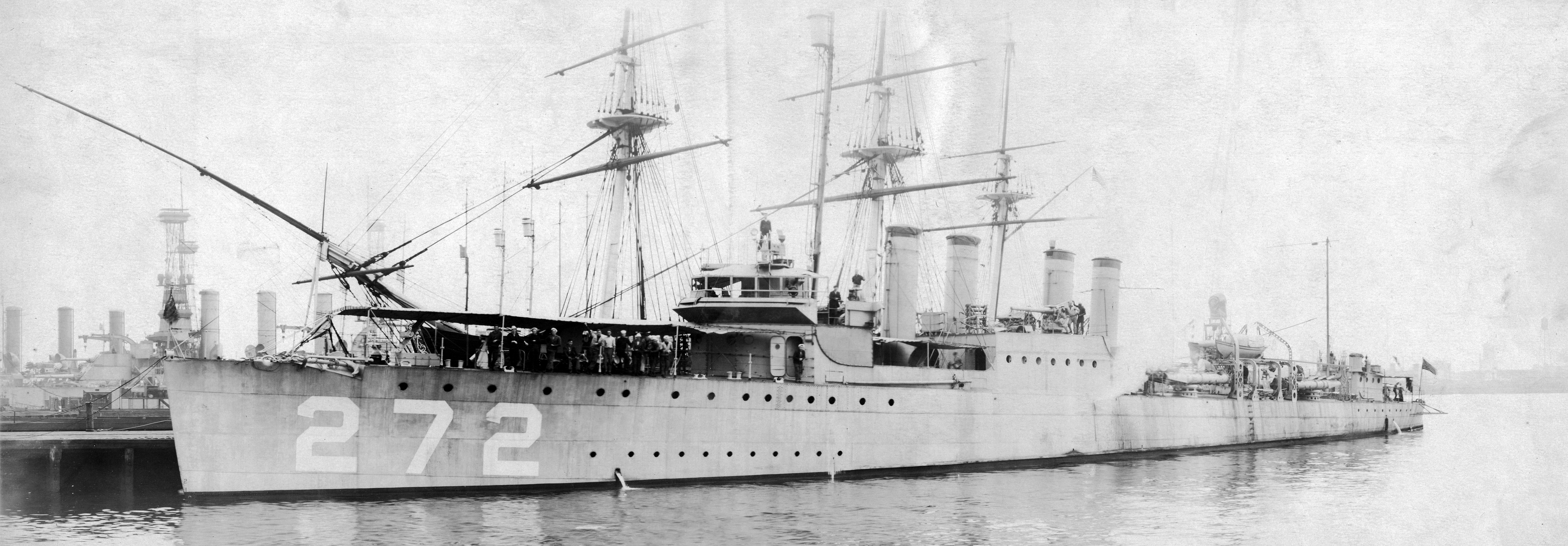

History

United States
- Namesake: Thomas Tingey
- Builder: Bethlehem Shipbuilding Corporation, Squantum Victory Yard
- Laid down: 8 August 1918
- Launched: 24 April 1919
- Commissioned: 25 July 1919
- Decommissioned: 24 May 1922
- Stricken: 19 May 1936
- Fate: Sold for scrap, 29 September 1936

General characteristics
- Class & type: Clemson-class destroyer
- Displacement: 1,290 long tons (1,311 t) (standard); 1,389 long tons (1,411 t) (deep load)
- Length: 314 ft 4 in (95.8 m)
- Beam: 30 ft 11 in (9.4 m)
- Draft: 10 ft 3 in (3.1 m)
- Installed power: 27,000 shp (20,000 kW); 4 water-tube boilers
- Propulsion: 2 shafts, 2 steam turbines
- Speed: 35 knots (65 km/h; 40 mph) (design)
- Range: 2,500 nautical miles (4,600 km; 2,900 mi) at 20 knots (37 km/h; 23 mph) (design)
- Complement: 6 officers, 108 enlisted men
- Armament: 4 × single 4-inch (102 mm) guns; 2 × single 1-pounder AA guns or; 2 × single 3-inch (76 mm) guns; 4 × triple 21 inch (533 mm) torpedo tubes; 2 × depth charge rails

USS Tingey (DD-272) was a Clemson-class destroyer in service with the United States Navy from 1919 to 1922. She was scrapped in 1936.

== Description ==
The Clemson class was a repeat of the preceding Wickes class although more fuel capacity was added. The ships displaced 1,290 long tons (1,311 t) at standard load and 1,389 long tons (1,411 t) at deep load. They had an overall length of 314 feet 4 inches (95.8 m), a beam of 30 feet 11 inches (9.4 m) and a draught of 10 feet 3 inches (3.1 m). They had a crew of 6 officers and 108 enlisted men.

Performance differed radically between the ships of the class, often due to poor workmanship. The Clemson class was powered by two steam turbines, each driving one propeller shaft, using steam provided by four water-tube boilers. The turbines were designed to produce a total of 27,000 shaft horsepower (20,000 kW) intended to reach a speed of 35 knots (65 km/h; 40 mph). The ships carried a maximum of 371 long tons (377 t) of fuel oil which was intended gave them a range of 2,500 nautical miles (4,600 km; 2,900 mi) at 20 knots (37 km/h; 23 mph).

The ships were armed with four 4-inch (102 mm) guns in single mounts and were fitted with two 1-pounder guns for anti-aircraft defense. In many ships a shortage of 1-pounders caused them to be replaced by 3-inch (76 mm) guns. Their primary weapon, though, was their torpedo battery of a dozen 21 inch (533 mm) torpedo tubes in four triple mounts. They also carried a pair of depth charge rails. A "Y-gun" depth charge thrower was added to many ships.

== Construction and career ==
Tingey, named for Thomas Tingey, was laid down on 8 August 1918 at Quincy, Massachusetts, by the Bethlehem Shipbuilding Corporation; launched on 24 April 1919; sponsored by Miss Mary Velora Arringdale; and commissioned on 25 July 1919, Commander Alfred Winsor Brown in command.

After fitting out, the destroyer proceeded to the west coast and joined Division 31, Squadron 2, Flotilla 10, at San Diego, California late in December. For the next two and a half years, the destroyer operated out of San Diego with the Pacific Fleet. During most of that period, however, she had only 50 percent of her normal complement. Consequently, though she did conduct operations and patrols along the western coast of Mexico, she remained in a quasi-reserve status throughout her brief period of commissioned service. She made but one organizational change during her active career and that came in the latter part of 1921 when she was reassigned to Division 29, Squadron 10.

In 1922, the anti-militarist feeling prevalent following World War I combined with the government's policy of financial retrenchment to cause the deactivation of a substantial portion of the Navy's recently expanded destroyer fleet; Tingey, therefore, was placed out of commission on 24 May 1922, berthed at San Diego, and remained there for the remainder of her career. After 14 years of inactivity, Tingey's name was struck from the Navy list on 19 May 1936. She was sold to the Schiavone-Bonomo Corporation, of New York City, on 29 September 1936 and was scrapped in December.
