= Edward H. Hurst =

Brigadier-general of the US Marines

Edward Hunter Hurst
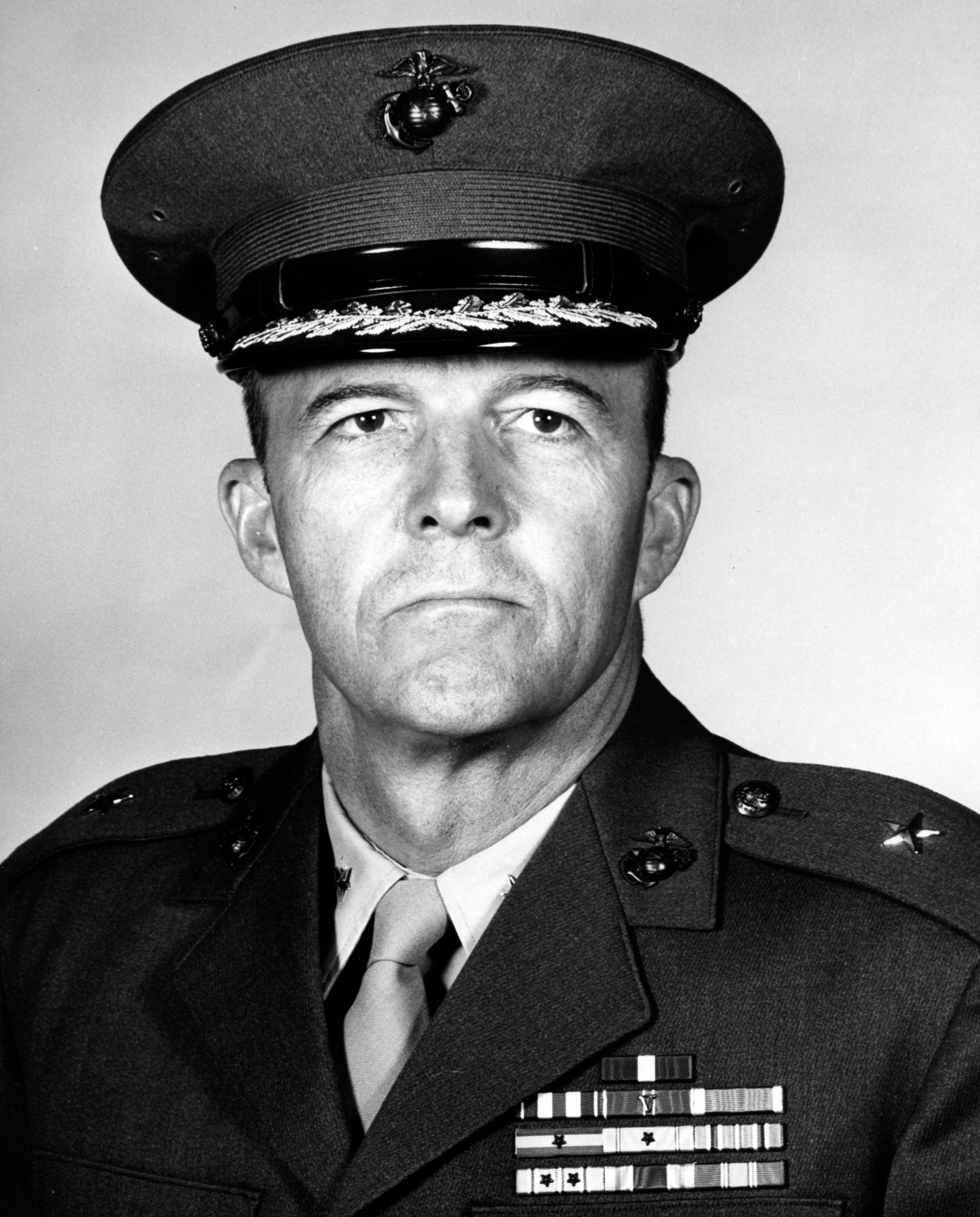
- BG Edward H. Hurst, USMC
- Born: December 18, 1916; Fort Valley, Georgia, US
- Died: September 6, 1997 (aged 80); Harlingen, Texas, US
- Burial place: Arlington National Cemetery
- Military career
- Allegiance: United States
- Branch: United States Marine Corps
- Service years: 1936–1968
- Rank: Brigadier general
- Service number: 0–5854
- Commands: 1st Marine Division; 3rd Marine Regiment; Camp Schwab; 3rd Battalion, 7th Marines
- Conflicts: World War II: Battle of Peleliu; Battle of Okinawa
- Awards: Navy Cross; Silver Star; Legion of Merit; Bronze Star Medal; Purple Heart
- Other work: Superintendent, Marine Military Academy

Edward Hunter Hurst (December 18, 1916 – September 6, 1997) was a highly decorated officer of the United States Marine Corps with the rank of brigadier general. He is the recipient of the Navy Cross, the United States military's second-highest decoration awarded for valor in combat. He completed his career as director of Marine Corps Landing Force Development Center Quantico in 1968.

Hurst was also a member of so-called "Chowder Society", special Marine Corps board, which was tasked to conduct research and prepare material relative to postwar legislation concerning the role of the Marine Corps in national defense.

== Early career ==
Hurst was born on December 18, 1916, in Fort Valley, Georgia, and attended high school there. He then enrolled in Mercer University in Macon, Georgia, and studied journalism. While studying, he joined the Marine Corps Reserve via a platoon leaders' class in April 1936 and attended several summer training camps. On graduating in June 1938 with a Bachelor of Arts degree, he was designated an honor graduate of the platoon leaders' class and commissioned second lieutenant in the Marine Corps on June 27, 1938.

Hurst was subsequently called up for active duty and attached to the Basic School at Philadelphia Navy Yard for further officer training. While at the Basic School, many of his classmates became general officers or had very distinguished career later: Gregory Boyington, Hugh M. Elwood, Lowell E. English, Carl J. Fleps, Charles J. Quilter, Donn J. Robertson or Alvin S. Sanders.

He completed training in May 1939 and was attached to the Marine detachment aboard the battleship USS New Mexico. He was stationed in Hawaii, before he received transfer orders for duty with the rifle range at Marine Barracks on Parris Island, South Carolina. He was promoted to first lieutenant in August 1941 and appointed commanding officer of the Marine detachment within Marine Barracks at the Naval Air Station Pensacola in Florida.

== World War II ==
Soon after the Japanese attack on Pearl Harbor, Hurst was promoted to the rank of captain in February 1942 but remained at Pensacola until his promotion to major in March 1943. He was subsequently ordered to the Naval Reserve Midshipman School in Northampton, Massachusetts, and appointed commander of the Marine Training Detachment within Women's Reserve.

In July 1943, Hurst was transferred to Camp Lejeune, North Carolina, and appointed commanding officer of the Officers' Training School, Marine Corps Women's Reserve Schools. He later completed the Command and General staff course at Marine Corps Schools, Quantico and finally received orders for deployment overseas in April 1944.

Hurst sailed to the Pacific area during the same month and assumed command of 3rd Battalion, 7th Marines, 1st Marine Division. Third Battalion was stationed on Pavuvu, Russell Islands for rest and refit after heavy fighting at Cape Gloucester, New Britain in early 1944. The Pavuvu Island was infested with rats and land crabs, what had influence on morale of troops, and moreover many of his men suffered with malaria, but Hurst transformed the battalion back to the combat force again.

The First Marine Division (including 7th Marines) was tasked with the capturing of Peleliu, Palau Islands and securing a large Japanese aerodrome, which could be used for further offensive in Pacific. On September 15, Hurst was forced to land his assault battalion of amphibious tanks in single file because of the heavily barricaded beach. Major Hurst braved intense hostile fire and, skillfully organizing his forces, pushed inland through dense undergrowth. Personally reconnoitering the front lines while in full view of enemy machine gun and small arms fire, he directed the battalion in a furious attack on Japanese fortified caves and blockhouses. He was subsequently decorated with the Silver Star for bravery and Navy Presidential Unit Citation.

Lieutenant Colonel Hurst then sailed with 7th Marines back to Pavuvu for rest and reequipment and remained there until the January 1945, when they were ordered along with the rest of 1st Marine Division to Guadalcanal for amphibious exercise. The Seventh Marines were ready for combat soon after and sailed for Okinawa at the beginning of April 1945.

Hurst and his battalion landed on April 3 and had the honor of being the first Marine unit to make it to the opposite side of the island. He led his battalion during the assault on Wana Ridge and distinguished himself while assisting in the evacuation of a wounded man over a path swept by Japanese small arms fire. Hurst was subsequently decorated with the Navy Cross, the United States military's second-highest decoration awarded for valor in combat.

His official Navy Cross citation reads:

The President of the United States of America takes pleasure in presenting the Navy Cross to Lieutenant Colonel Edward H. Hurst (MCSN: 0–5854), United States Marine Corps, for extraordinary heroism as Commanding Officer, Third Battalion, Seventh Marines, FIRST Marine Division, in action against enemy Japanese forces on Okinawa, Ryukyu Islands, 18 May 1945. While directing his battalion's assault against the heavily-defended Wana Ridge, Lieutenant Colonel Hurst occupied a forward observation post which was swept by intense hostile small-arms fire and mortar concentrations. Observing that platoons of the assault company were being subjected to devastating enemy fire, he courageously moved forward from his post to the company and, in the face of heavy Japanese mortar and small-arms fire, personally directed the assault on the desperately defended crest of the ridge. While returning to his observation post after his troops had gained a foothold on the ridge, Lieutenant Colonel Hurst personally assisted in the evacuation of a wounded man over a path swept by hostile small-arms fire. His bravery, able leadership, and gallant fighting spirit throughout were in keeping with the highest traditions of the United States Naval Service.

He then led his battalion during the attack on enemy's emplacements near Kokuba River and advanced to Oroku Peninsula. During the assault on Kunishi Ridge on June 19, Hurst was wounded in the neck by concealed Japanese rifleman and evacuated to the rear. He was relieved by Lieutenant Colonel Stephen V. Sabol and decorated with the Bronze Star Medal with Combat "V" for his service during the latter part of Okinawa campaign. Hurst also received the Purple Heart for his wounds and second Navy Presidential Unit Citation.

== Postwar service ==
Hurst was ordered to the United States and spent some time with recovery in the naval hospital. He was subsequently ordered to Washington, D.C., and attached to the Division of Plans and Policies at Headquarters Marine Corps. Hurst served under Brigadier General Gerald C. Thomas in this capacity and later served as Marine Corps liaison officer with the Secretary's Committee of Research on Reorganization in the Office of the Secretary of the Navy under James Forrestal.

While in this capacity, Hurts was a member of the so-called "Chowder Society", a special Marine Corps board under general Thomas, which was tasked by Commandant Alexander Vandegrift to conduct research and prepare material relative to postwar legislation concerning the role of the Marine Corps in national defense. Due to cuts in Marine Corps budget, the threat of merging of the Marine Corps into the United States Army, was more realistic. Also thanks to his work, he is one of the few men who helped the future of the Corps.

During his assignment with that board, Hurst had the opportunity to cooperate with figures of modern Marine history such as: Merrill B. Twining, Victor H. Krulak, Merritt A. Edson, Robert E. Hogaboom, James E. Kerr, James C. Murray, Jonas M. Platt, DeWolf Schatzel, Samuel R. Shaw, Robert D. Heinl, James D. Hittle or Marine Corps Reserve officers John R. Blandford, Arthur B. Hanson, Lyford Hutchins, and William McCahill.

He left Washington in June 1947 in order to attend Instructors' Orientation Course at the Marine Corps Schools, Quantico. Following the completion of the course, Hurst served as leadership section chief and officer in charge of the student battalion at the Basic School. His duty at Quantico ended in December 1949, when he was attached to the Swedish Language School at Washington Navy Yard and following the graduation in July 1950, he was ordered to Stockholm, Sweden, for duty as assistant naval attache for air at the American embassy.

After two years in Europe, Hurst returned to the United States in November 1952 and joined 2nd Marine Division at Camp Lejeune, North Carolina. He served as assistant chief of staff for operations under future Commandant of the Marine Corps, Major General Randolph M. Pate. While in this capacity, he was promoted to the rank of colonel in January 1954.

Hurst was ordered back to Headquarters Marine Corps in July 1954 and attached to the Operations Division (G-3) as head of Joint Chief of Staff and Plan Review Section and later also served as head of Plans Brach. His tour of duty there ended in June 1957, when he was ordered to the course at National War College in Washington, D.C. He graduated in June 1958 and sailed for Hawaii one month later for duty at joint staff of the commander in chief Pacific Fleet under Admiral Herbert G. Hopwood. Hurst served as head, Southeast Asia Plans and Policy Section until March 1960.

Upon his return to the United States, Hurst assumed command of the schools battalion at Camp Pendleton, California and Commander of Pendleton's subcamp – Camp Del Mar. Hurst was ordered to Okinawa, Japan, in March 1962 and assumed command of 3rd Marine Regiment, 3rd Marine Division. He also held additional duty as commanding officer of Camp Schwab.

He was nominated for the promotion to the rank of brigadier general in April 1963 and ordered back to Camp Pendleton for duty as assistant division commander, 1st Marine Division. Hurst's general's promotion was confirmed on July 1, 1963. He then served as deputy to Major General William T. Fairbourn until July 10, 1965, when general Fairbourn was ordered for duty in Washington and then assumed temporary command of 1st Marine Division.

Hurst did not deploy with the division to Vietnam and was relieved by Brigadier General William A. Stiles. He assumed duty as director of Marine Corps Landing Force Development Center, Quantico, Virginia, in October 1965 and remained in that capacity until his retirement on January 1, 1968. He was decorated with the Legion of Merit for his service in that capacity.

== Retirement ==
Upon his retirement from the Marine Corps after 32 years of active service, General Hurst settled in Harlingen, Texas, where he served as superintendent of local Marine Military Academy. Brigadier General Edward H. Hurst died on September 6, 1997, and is buried together with his wife Emma Randolph Elebash at Arlington National Cemetery, Virginia. They had together three daughters.

== Decorations ==
Here is the ribbon bar of Brigadier General Edward H. Hurst:

1st Row	Navy Cross		Silver Star
2nd Row	Legion of Merit	Bronze Star Medal with Combat "V"	Purple Heart
3rd Row	Navy Presidential Unit Citation with one star	American Defense Service Medal with Fleet Clasp	American Campaign Medal
4th Row	Asiatic-Pacific Campaign Medal with two 3/16 inch service stars	World War II Victory Medal	National Defense Service Medal with one star

== See also ==
- List of 1st Marine Division Commanders
- Battle of Peleliu
- 3rd Battalion, 7th Marines

Military offices
Preceded by William T. Fairbourn	Commanding General of 1st Marine Division; July 10, 1965 – August 10, 1965	Succeeded by Lewis J. Fields
