= Lloyd Stowell Shapley =

Naval Governor of Guam from 1926 to 1929

Captain Lloyd Stowell Shapley

32nd Naval Governor of Guam
- In office April 7, 1926 – June 11, 1929
- Preceded by: Alfred Winsor Brown
- Succeeded by: Willis W. Bradley

Personal details
- Born: November 3, 1875 Lebanon, New York, U.S.
- Died: August 16, 1959 (aged 83) Alameda Country, California, U.S.
- Spouse(s): Elizabeth Harrison Shapley, Ida V. Wells, Naomi Eckstein
- Relatives: Elizabeth Harrison Shapley (daughter)
- Awards: Navy Cross

Military service
- Allegiance: United States
- Branch/service: United States Navy
- Rank: Captain

Lloyd Stowell Shapley (November 3, 1875 – August 16, 1959) was a United States Navy Captain who served as the 32nd Naval Governor of Guam. Shapley served as governor from April 7, 1926, to June 11, 1929.

== Early life ==
Shapley was born in Lebanon, New York.

== Career ==
In 1920, Shapley was assigned to the torpedo station at Keyport, Washington.

In 1922, Shapley took command of USS Neches (AO-5), until October 4, 1923.

On April 7, 1926, Shapley took an oath and became the Naval Governor of Guam, until June 11, 1929.

As governor of Guam, Shapley pushed for the Navy to approve a Flag of Guam; he succeeded in gaining approval in 1929, though the design changed 19 years later. The flag consisted of a blue field with a central red-lined figure containing a Guamanian sling stone. During his time in office, he had already retired from Naval service.

== Published works ==
- Shapley, L.S. (January 1930). "The Story of the Island of Guam". The Mid-Pacific. 39 (1): 17–24.

== Personal life ==
On November 6, 1912, Shapley married Elizabeth Harrison McCormick Herrshoff (1884-1938), former wife of Charles Frederick Herreshoff. She had two children from her previous marriage, Allan Stuart and Elizabeth.

Shapley's daughter is Elizabeth Harrison Shapley. On April 25, 1918, she was a sponsor of USS Kilty (DD-137).

Shapley's second wife was Ida Viola Wells (maiden; 1878–1950), notable as a pioneering woman professional, who, among other things, was an inheritance tax attorney.

Shapley's third wife was Naomi Eckstein (1903-1991).

On August 16, 1959, Shapley died in Alameda County, California.

His grand-nephew, Lloyd Stowell Shapley (1923–2016), was an American mathematician and Nobel laureate economist. His adopted or stepson, Alan Shapley, (né Alan Herreshoff; 1903–1973), late of the U.S. Marine Corps, was a survivor of the sinking of the USS Arizona in the attack on Pearl Harbor.

Military offices
Preceded by Alfred Winsor Brown	Naval Governor of Guam; 1926–1929	Succeeded by Willis W. Bradley
