= James D. Beans =

Officer in the U.S. Marine Corps

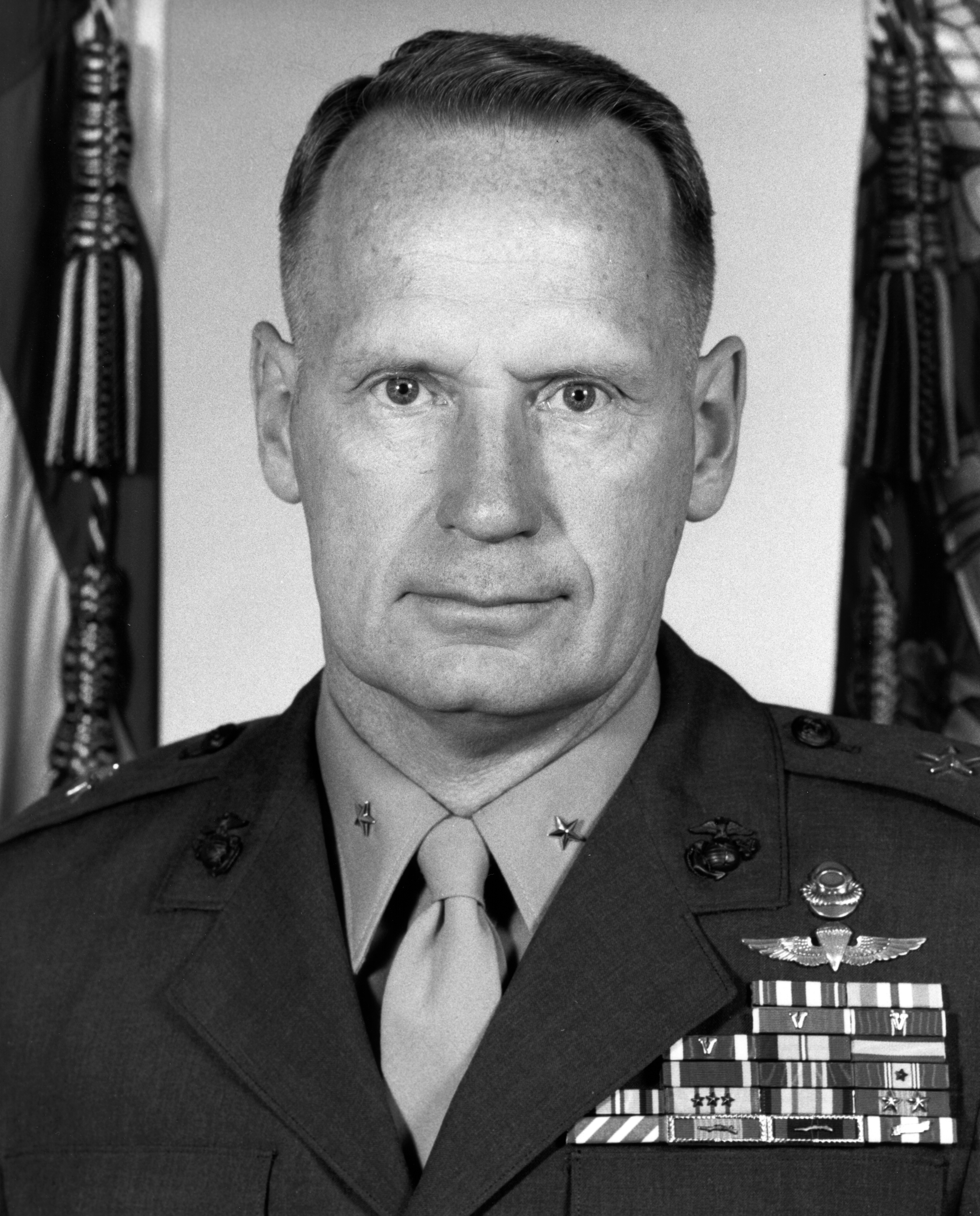
- BG James D. Beans, USMC
- Born: December 21, 1934 (age 91); Annapolis, Maryland, U.S.
- Relatives: Brigadier General Fred D. Beans (father)
- Military career
- Allegiance: United States
- Branch: United States Marine Corps
- Service years: 1957–1989
- Rank: Brigadier General
- Nickname: "Buzz"
- Service number: 0-72931
- Commands: Intelligence Division; Landing Force Training Command, Pacific; 5th Marine Brigade; 9th Amphibious Brigade; 1st Battalion, 5th Marines
- Conflicts: Dominican Civil War; Vietnam War: Operation Prairie; Operation Prairie IV; Operation Kingfisher; Operation Kentucky
- Awards: Navy Distinguished Service Medal; Silver Star; Defense Superior Service Medal; Legion of Merit; Bronze Star Medal; Navy Commendation Medal

James Dale Beans (born December 21, 1934) is a retired officer of the United States Marine Corps with the rank of brigadier general. He is most noted for his service as the assistant chief of staff for Command, Control, Communications, and Computer, Intelligence and Interoperability Department and as director, Intelligence Division, Headquarters Marine Corps. He is the son of Brigadier General Fred D. Beans.

== Early career ==
James D. Beans was born on December 21, 1934, at Annapolis, Maryland, as the son of Marine officer, Fred D. Beans and Elizabeth Stehle. He spent his early years in Peking and Shanghai, China, where his father was stationed with 6th Marines, before his family returned to the United States and settled in Annapolis. Upon the graduation from the high school, Beans entered the Severn School, a preparatory school for the Naval Academy, where he spent one year, before he was admitted to the United States Naval Academy in Annapolis, Maryland, in June 1953.

During his time at the academy, Beans was active in Lacrosse team and also achieved athletic fame in pool and bridge. He graduated with bachelor's degree on June 7, 1957, and was commissioned second lieutetenant in the Marine Corps on that date. Beans was subsequently ordered to the Basic School at Marine Corps Base Quantico and completed his basic officer training in May 1958. He was then sent to the Camp Lejeune, North Carolina and served consecutively as Platoon Commander, Company Executive Officer and Battalion Adjutant with 1st Battalion, 8th Marines until November 1959.

Beans was subsequently transferred to the 2nd Force Reconnaissance Company as Supply and Service Platoon Commander, and later, as the Pathfinder Platoon Commander. While in this capacity, Beans was promoted to first lieutenant on December 7, 1958, and to captain on May 1, 1962. He served with 2nd Reconnaissance Company until December 1962, when he assumed duty as commanding officer, Marine Detachment aboard the cruiser USS Little Rock.

Beans participated in the cruise to the Mediterranean and later to the Middle East and was ordered back to Camp Lejeune in mid-1964. He then served consecutively as company commander, intelligence and operations officer in the 1st Battalion, 6th Marines under lieutenant colonel William F. Doehler, and participated in operations in the Dominican Republic during the Civil War in May–June 1965.

Upon his return to the United States at the beginning of June of that year, Beans remained with 6th Marines at Camp Lejeune, North Carolina, before he received orders for deployment to South Vietnam in August 1966.

== Vietnam War ==
=== First tour ===
Beans joined the 1st Battalion, 9th Marines, 3rd Marine Division south of Da Nang, where it conducted numerous search and destroy operations to find the enemy, while strengthening the civic action programs to secure relations with the Vietnamese people, and free the people from the constant threat of Viet Cong terrorism. However this duty lasted just until the end of September 1966, when it was ordered to Okinawa, Japan and attached to the 9th Marine Amphibious Brigade. The brigade served as the Special Landing Force of the Seventh Fleet.

Following the promotion to major on January 1, 1967, Beans was sent back to South Vietnam and appointed operations officer, 4th Marine Regiment at Phu Bai under Colonel William L. Dick. The Fourth Marines participated as the part of 3rd Marine Division under Major General Bruno Hochmuth in Operations Prairie, Prairie IV, Kingfisher or Kentucky. On November 14, 1967, General Hochmuth and five others were riding in a helicopter on an inspection tour near the city of Huế, when his helicopter exploded and crashed soon after it took off. Colonel Dick and Beans learned of the crash around 1400 on November 14 and both reached the crash site quickly by their own helicopter.

Dick and Beans spotted the General Hochmuth's Huey Helicopter upside down in a rice paddy filled to the brim by the heavy rains which had been falling for several weeks. They reached the wreckage, where there were flames on the water's surface around the aircraft. Accompanied by the regimental sergeant major, who tried to extinguish the fire, Dick and Beans commenced diving beneath the surface, groping through the water for possible survivors.

Beans and others recovered six who had died in the crash, including the body of General Hochmuth, who was still sitting in the rear seat of the helicopter, the spot where he usually traveled when visiting the various command posts.

Soon after this incident, Beans completed his tour of duty and was ordered back to the United States under rotation policy. For his service in Vietnam, he was decorated with Bronze Star Medal and Navy Commendation Medal, both with Combat "V" and also received Vietnam Gallantry Cross with Star.

=== Stateside duty ===
Upon his return to the States in December 1967, Beans was ordered to Quantico, where he was appointed company commander and instructor at the Basic School. He participated in the training of newly commissioned Marine officers until January 1970, when he was sent to the Naval Postgraduate School in Monterey, California. Beans graduated with Master of Science degree in Computer Science in December 1971. After a brief stint back at Quantico with the Basic School, Beans received orders for his second deployment to South Vietnam.

=== Second tour ===
Beans arrived to Saigon in March 1972 and assumed duty as advisor, Marine Advisory Unit. He served as the Senior Infantry Advisor to the 9th Vietnamese Marine Corps Infantry Battalion engaged in combat operations to defend the Song O-Khe bridgehead on National Route ONE, nine miles Southeast of Quang Tri City. On May 2, 1972, North Vietnamese Army commenced massive enemy artillery barrage, which struck the bridgehead area for twenty minutes and subsequently launched a bold well-coordinated North Vietnamese Infantry battalion assault from the North, supported by eighteen enemy tanks T-54/T-55.

Three of the lead tanks successfully breached the bridgehead defenses, rapidly crossed the bridge and penetrated the 9th Battalion's Command Post area on the South bank of the Song O'Khe River. A fierce close-quarter enemy tank versus Marine infantrymen battle ensued. Beans calmly responded to this critical situation by calling for and receiving close air support aircraft which isolated the enemy tanks and permitted their destruction. He then moved to an exposed observation position where he directed intensely accurate air strikes on the remainder of the enemy tanks and infantry.

During this crucial moments he was subjected to intense enemy automatic weapons and tank fire. With complete disregard for his own personal safety, he remained in his exposed position and resolutely persisted in his accurate direction of devastating air strikes that destroyed much of the enemy armor. Beans contributed to the 9th Vietnamese Battalion's success in repelling the enemy's coordinated attack and directly attributed to the safe passage of over 10,000 friendly troops to the Hue City area. For his leadership and bravery in action, Beans was decorated with Silver Star.

Following the battle, Beans served as advisor at the headquarters of 369th Vietnamese Marine Brigade and subsequently assumed duty as Logistics advisor at the headquarters, Vietnamese Marine Corps. He remained in South Vietnam until March 1973 and received Legion of Merit with Combat "V" for his service and also was decorated with Vietnam Staff Service Medal, 1st Class and second Vietnam Gallantry Cross with Star.

== Later career ==
Upon his return to the United States, Beans assumed duty at headquarters, Fleet Marine Force, Pacific on Hawaii and served under lieutenant general Louis H. Wilson Jr. as director, Automated Services Center and subsequently, as assistant chief of staff for management. He departed Hawaii in June 1976 and entered the Senior Course at the Marine Corps Command and Staff College at Quantico, Virginia.

He graduated one year later and joined the 1st Marine Division under Major General Edward A. Wilcox at Camp Pendleton, California. Beans served as lieutenant colonel and executive officer, 5th Marine Regiment until March 1978, when assumed command, 1st Battalion, 5th Marines.

Beans was sent to the Executive Seminar for National and International Affairs in August 1979 and following the graduation in June of the following year, he was promoted to colonel and joined the Joint Chiefs of Staff. He first served as the Southeast Asia Branch Chief for Military Plans (J-5) until May 15, 1981, when he was reassigned as the Marine Corps Member to the Chairman's Staff Group, Office of the Chairman, Joint Chiefs of Staff.

While in this capacity, Beans served consecutively under Generals David C. Jones and John William Vessey Jr. and was responsible for such diverse matters as readiness, force deployments, security assistance, exercises, and contingency planning for the Pacific, Southwest Asian and Indian Ocean areas. He provided direct and substantive inputs to Department of Defense and interagency planning. Additionally, he proposed invaluable advice and counsel while accompanying the chairman on official trips to military facilities and operational units in Alaska, Japan, Korea, Thailand and the Philippines. On each occasion, he prepared the chairman for discussions with heads of state and other high-level officials.

He remained in this capacity until June 24, 1983, and received Defense Superior Service Medal for his service. Beans subsequently served as the deputy director, Personnel Management Division, Headquarters Marine Corps and was promoted to brigadier general on May 10, 1984.

Beans was subsequently sent back to Okinawa, Japan, and assumed duty as assistant division commander, 3rd Marine Division under Major General Edwin J. Godfrey. While in this capacity, Beans also held additional duty as commanding general, 9th Amphibious Brigade and deputy commander, III Marine Amphibious Force.

He returned to the United States in July 1985 and served as the commander, Forward Headquarters Element/Inspector General for the United States Central Command with headquarters at MacDill Air Force Base, Florida. Beans served in this capacity under General George B. Crist until August 1986, when he was ordered to Camp Pendleton, California for duty as the Commanding General, 5th Marine Brigade, which served as a Marine Air-Ground Task Force of Fleet Marine Force, Pacific (FMFPac).

While at Camp Pendleton, Beans was assigned additional duty as the commanding general, Landing Force Training Command, Pacific, on September 3, 1987, and was responsible for the amphibious training of FMFPac units until May 5, 1988.

Beans subsequently assumed his final duty as the assistant chief of staff for Command, Control, Communications, and Computer, Intelligence and Interoperability Department and as director, Intelligence Division, Headquarters Marine Corps. While in this capacity, he was responsible for establishment of sound policies and procedures for the department that will serve the intelligence community and the Marine Corps for years to come. During his tenure, the Marine Corps' participation in the Worldwide Military Command and Control System more than doubled, and the network was extended throughout Fleet Marine Force (FMF), Atlantic and Pacific.

Additionally, Beans laid the groundwork for a secure video teleconferencing network which allowed commanders and action officers to conduct "face-to-face" meetings and briefings without the time and cost consumed by travel. He significantly improved the intelligence posture of both FMF's and the National Intelligence Community and often developed, represented, and defended Marine Corps positions on intelligence and counterintelligence matters.

== Retirement ==
Beans retired from active duty on July 1, 1989, and was decorated with the Distinguished Service Medal for his service at Headquarters Marine Corps. Beans then settled in Fairfax, Virginia, where he operated his own business in commercial services. He is married to June Wolfe Bruton and has one son and one daughter.

== Medals and decorations ==
Here is the ribbon bar of Brigadier General Beans:

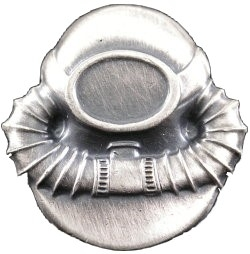

| Badge | Scuba Diver Insignia | | | |
| Badge | Navy/Marine Corps Parachutist Insignia | | | |
| 1st row | Navy Distinguished Service Medal | | Silver Star | Defense Superior Service Medal |
| 2nd row | Legion of Merit with Combat "V" | Bronze Star with Combat "V" | Navy Commendation Medal with Combat "V" | Combat Action Ribbon |
| 3rd row | Navy Presidential Unit Citation | Navy Unit Commendation | Navy Meritorious Unit Commendation | National Defense Service Medal with one star |
| 4th row | Armed Forces Expeditionary Medal | Vietnam Service Medal with three 3/16 inch service stars | Marine Corps Sea Service Ribbon | Vietnam Gallantry Cross with two Stars |
| 5th row | Vietnam Staff Service Medal, 1st Class | Vietnam Gallantry Cross Unit Citation | Vietnam Civil Actions Unit Citation | Vietnam Campaign Medal |
