= Ida V. Wells =

American lawyer

- Born: Ida Viola Wells; February 12, 1878; Greenfield, Missouri, U.S.
- Died: June 14, 1950 (aged 72); Alameda County, California, U.S.
- Education: USC Gould School of Law (LLB)
- Occupation: Lawyer
- Spouse: Lloyd Stowell Shapley (m. 1943)
- Parent(s): Harry Taylor Wells; Ella Morella Bennett

Ida Viola Wells (February 12, 1878 – June 14, 1950) was an American lawyer.

== Early life ==
Wells was born to Harry Taylor Wells (1853–1932), a dentist, and Ella Morella Wells (née Bennett; 1856–1939).

== Career ==
Wells, in 1916, earned a Bachelor of Law degree from the University of Southern California. She was an associate with Arthur Wilson Eckman (1885–1974) in the Walter P. Story Building in the Broadway Theater and Commercial Districts of Los Angeles. For a little over two years, beginning December 18, 1921, Wells was Assistant State Inheritance Tax Attorney for California. She resigned January 31, 1924, to take charge of the Women's Bureau of the Johnson-for-President Club of Southern California. She then went on to serve as Deputy City Prosecutor for Los Angeles from about 1927 to about 1939.

== Affiliations ==
While studying law at USC, Wells was a member of Phi Delta Delta (USC's Alpha chapter), which, at the time, was the only women's professional law fraternity in the country. Wells went on to become the director of the Women Lawyers' Association. She was president of the Professional Women's Club. She was a member of the Women Lawyers' Club, Republican Study Club, Soroptimist Club, State and County Bar Association, Women's Political League.

== Personal life ==
Wells moved to California in 1908 and lived at 1744 West 24th St., Los Angeles, California. Wells, in 1943 in Berkeley, California, married Lloyd Stowell Shapley (1875–1959) (his second of three marriages; her first), a naval captain who, among other things, served as the 23rd Naval Governor of Guam, from April 7, 1926, to June 11, 1929.
