= Harry Bertram =

Harry Bertram may refer to:

- A character in the novel Guy Mannering, by Sir Walter Scott
- Harry Bertram, the American Third Position Party's candidate in the West Virginia gubernatorial special election, 2011

== See also ==
- Henry Bertram (disambiguation)
