= Skidmore, Kansas =

Unincorporated community in Cherokee County, Kansas

Coordinates: 37°14′25″N 94°49′55″W

Skidmore is an unincorporated community in Cherokee County, Kansas, United States.

== History ==
A post office was opened in Skidmore in 1903, and remained in operation until it was discontinued in 1915.

== Notable people ==
- Fred D. Beans, a decorated Marine Raider who rose to the rank of Brigadier General
