= Bruno Hochmuth =

United States Marine Corps general (1911-1967)

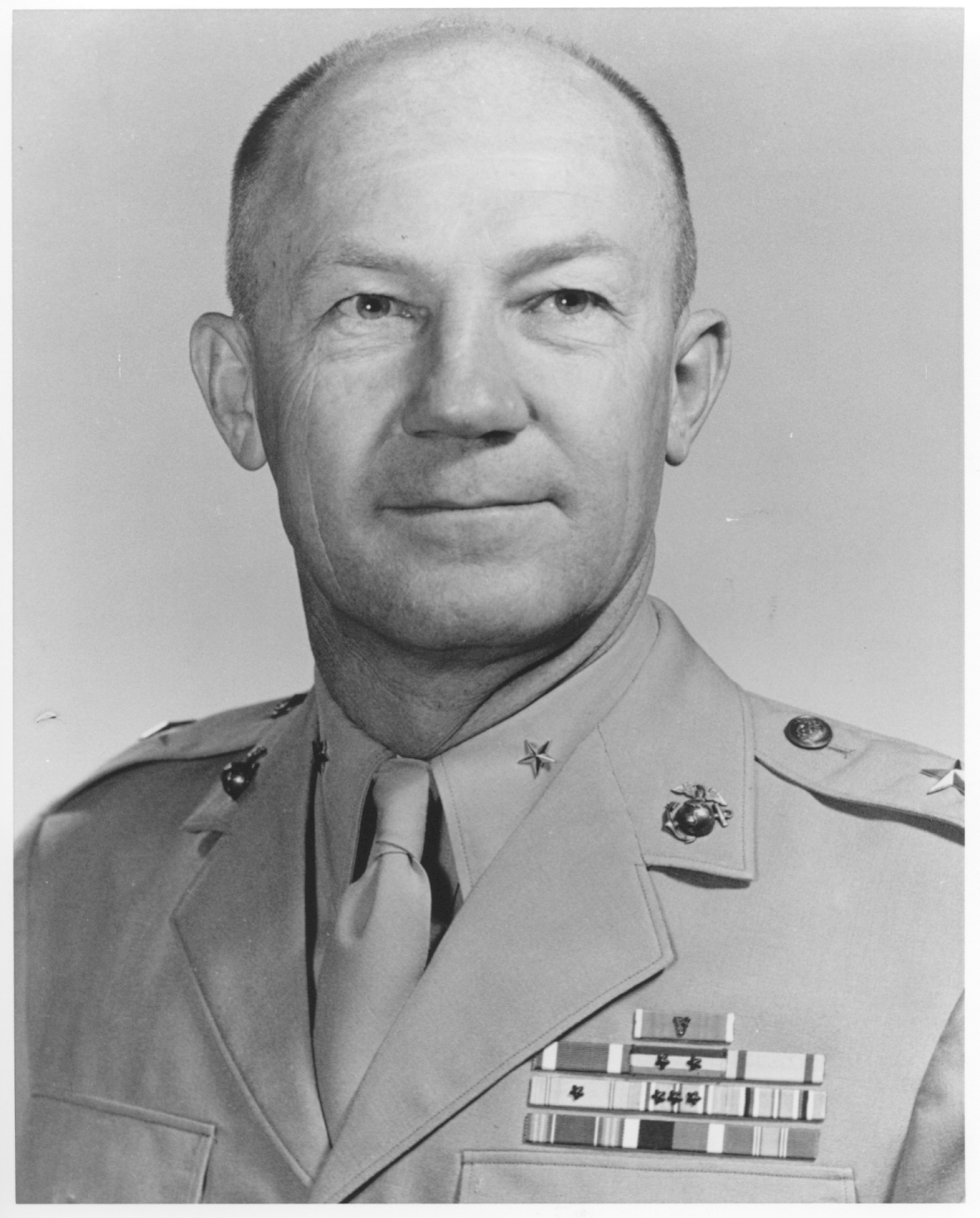
- Born: May 10, 1911; Houston, Texas, U.S.
- Died: November 14, 1967 (aged 56); Huế, Thừa Thiên Huế, Vietnam
- Burial place: Fort Rosecrans National Cemetery
- Military career
- Allegiance: United States
- Branch: United States Marine Corps
- Service years: 1935–1967
- Rank: Major general
- Commands: 3rd Marine Division; Marine Corps Recruit Depot San Diego; 3rd Battalion 4th Marines
- Conflicts: World War II: Battle of Saipan; Battle of Tinian; Battle of Okinawa; Vietnam War †
- Awards: Navy Distinguished Service Medal; Legion of Merit w/ Combat "V"; Navy and Marine Corps Commendation Medal (2); Purple Heart (2)

Bruno Arthur Hochmuth (May 10, 1911 – November 14, 1967) was a United States Marine Corps major general who was killed in South Vietnam during the Vietnam War. He was the first and only Marine Corps division commander to be killed in any war. He was also the first American general officer to be killed in Vietnam itself, although U.S. Air Force Major General William Crumm had been killed on July 6, 1967, in a B-52 bomber collision over the South China Sea. Hochmuth, four other marines, and a South Vietnamese Army aide were killed when a UH-1E Huey helicopter they were riding in from VMO-3 exploded and crashed five miles northwest of Huế.

== Early life and career ==
Hochmuth was born on May 10, 1911, in Houston, Texas. He graduated from high school in 1930 and completed a Bachelor of Science degree in Industrial Education from Texas A&M University in June 1935. He was commissioned a Marine second lieutenant in July 1935, upon resigning a U.S. Army Reserve commission.

After completing The Basic School at the Philadelphia Navy Yard, he joined the Marine detachment at the Texas Centennial in Dallas, Texas, in June 1936. In December 1936, he was transferred to 2nd Battalion, 6th Marines in San Diego, California. Departing for Shanghai, China, in August 1937, he served briefly with the 6th Marines, then served two and a half years duty with the 4th Marines. While overseas, he was promoted to first lieutenant in July 1938. He remained with the 4th Marines in China until 1940.

Upon his return to the United States, Lieutenant Hochmuth was attached to the 7th Defense Battalion in September 1940. In February 1941, he embarked with the 7th Defense Battalion to American and Western Samoa. He was promoted to major in May 1942. He remained in the Pacific Theater for two years, returning to the United States in March 1943, where he was assigned to the Antiaircraft Artillery School at Marine Corps Base Camp Lejeune, North Carolina, until June 1943. From June until May 1944, Hochmuth served as assistant director, Command and Staff School, Quantico, Virginia, prior to embarking again for the Pacific area.

In May 1944, Major Hochmuth deployed again as assistant operations officer for the III Marine Amphibious Corps and participated in the Battle of Saipan and Battle of Tinian. He then commanded 3rd Battalion, 4th Marines during the Battle of Okinawa. For his service during Okinawa Campaign, Hochmuth received the Legion of Merit with Combat "V".

Following the surrender of Japan he was the executive officer of the 4th Marine Regiment when they landed in Japan on August 29, 1945. As executive officer of the 4th Marines, he made the initial landing on Japan August 29, 1945, and on September 2 of the same year attended the formal surrender ceremony at Yokosuka. He then commanded the Marine Barracks at Yokosuka for almost two years. For his service there, he was awarded the Navy Commendation Medal.

Returning to the United States in August 1947, he served at Headquarters Marine Corps for three years, then entered the Industrial College at Fort McNair in Washington, D.C. He graduated in June 1951, and returned to Camp Lejeune as commanding officer, 2nd Marines. In July 1952, he was named G-1 Officer, 2nd Marine Division at Camp Lejeune. He was promoted to lieutenant colonel in August 1947 with rank from October 1942, and to colonel in January 1951.

Ordered to Kingston, Ontario, in September 1953, he served as instructor, Canadian Army Staff College, for two years. He again went to the Far East in August 1955 and served as G-4 Officer, 3rd Marine Division, Japan and Okinawa. In August 1956, Colonel Hochmuth was assigned to Marine Corps Base Quantico, Virginia, as a member of the Advanced Research Group, Marine Corps Educational Center.

In July 1957, he was transferred to Marine Corps Recruit Depot San Diego and served as chief of staff through October 1959. While stationed in San Diego, he was promoted to brigadier general in November 1959 and served briefly thereafter as commanding general of the Marine Corps Recruit Depot and, later, as commanding general of the Recruit Training Command.

In January 1960, General Hochmuth reported to Headquarters Marine Corps, where he served as deputy chief of staff (research and development). While serving in this capacity, he was promoted to major general in August 1963. That November, he assumed duty as commanding general, Marine Corps Recruit Depot, San Diego, California. For meritorious achievement from November 1963 to February 1967, General Hochmuth was awarded a gold 5/16 inch star in lieu of a second Navy Commendation Medal.

== Vietnam and death ==
Beginning on March 19, 1967, Hochmuth served as commanding general, 3rd Marine Division, in the Republic of Vietnam. On November 14, Hochmuth and five others were riding in a helicopter on an inspection tour. The helicopter exploded and crashed soon after it took off. At the time of his death, he was the most senior U.S. military officer to be killed in the war.

The details of his death were later described by his subordinate and commanding officer, 4th Marine Regiment, Colonel William L. Dick. Dick was located at his headquarters at Phu Bai Combat Base, when he learned of the crash around 14:00 on 14 November. Since he had a helicopter sitting on a pad at his headquarters, Dick, accompanied by his operations officer, Major James D. Beans and the regimental sergeant major, quickly reached the crash scene. Dick described the rescue attempt:

After several passes, I spotted the Huey upside down in a rice paddy filled to the brim by the heavy rains which had been falling for several weeks... I directed the helicopter pilot to land on the paddy dike nearest the crash site from where the three of us walked through about 200 yards of paddy water until we reached the wreckage. There were flames on the water's surface around the aircraft. While the sergeant major attempted to extinguish these, Major Beans and I commenced diving beneath the surface, groping through the water for possible survivors. We had no idea just how long it had been since the crash had occurred. This was a difficult task, as you can imagine, since the water was full of silt, not to mention leeches, and impossible to see through. The three of us were joined by a Vietnamese farmer who refused to identify himself and could be distinguished only by a small gold crucifix around his neck. The four of us, after getting rid of the aviation fuel flames, repeatedly went below the surface into the helicopter cabin and by touch, finally found the bodies, one by one, of the six who had died in the crash. The helicopter had turned upside down just before impact which made the situation even more difficult. The last body recovered was General Hochmuth. I found him in the rear seat of the helicopter, the spot where he usually traveled when visiting the various command posts.

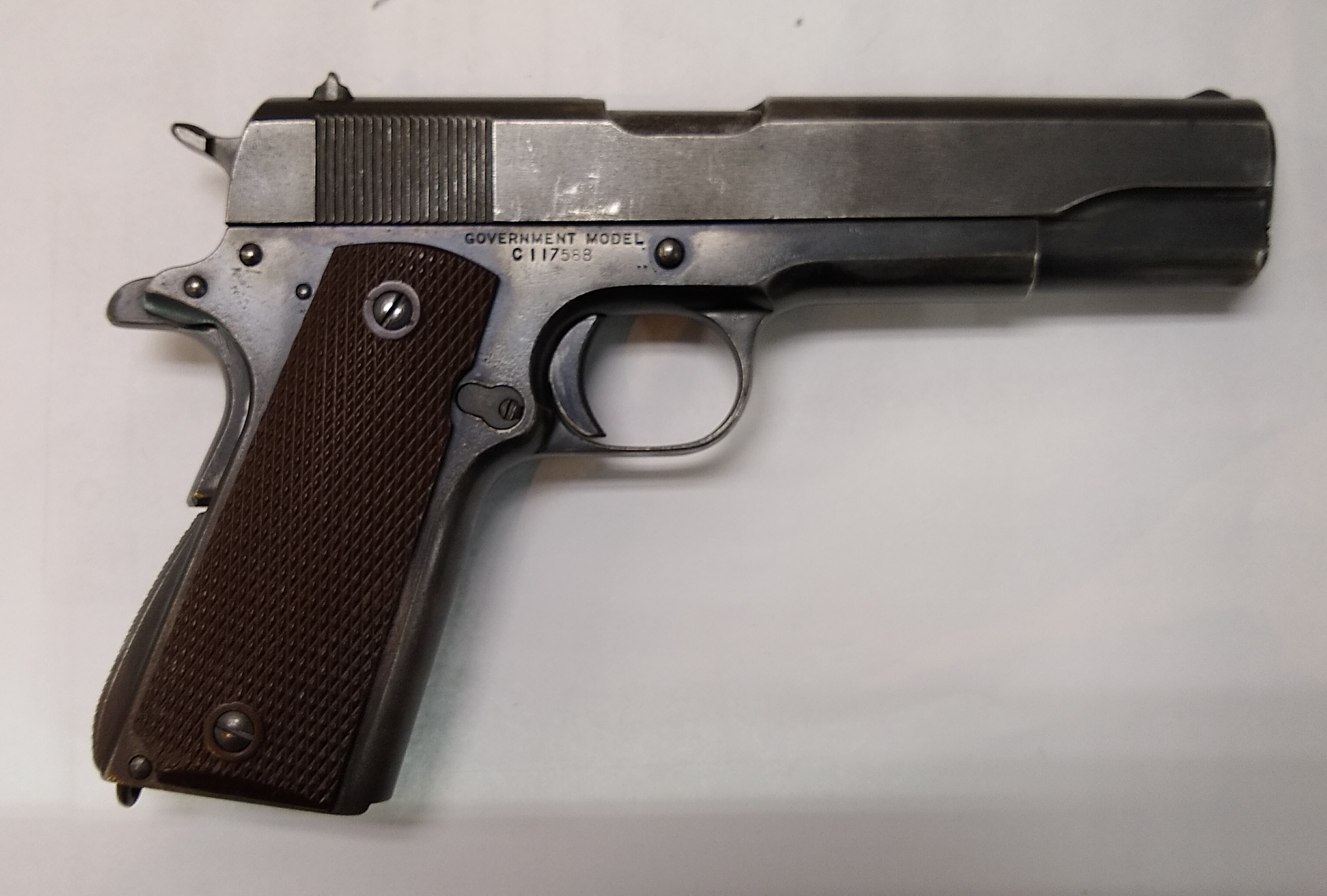
Likely general's personal pistol (1919 civilian Government Model with A1 parts); later presented to his former aide-de-camp CAPT John C. Morris, Jr.

For his service during this period, he was posthumously awarded the Navy Distinguished Service Medal and Purple Heart. Hochmuth was buried with full military honors at Fort Rosecrans National Cemetery, San Diego, California, on November 18, 1967.

== Awards and decorations ==
Hochmuth's military awards include:

1st Row	Navy Distinguished Service Medal	Legion of Merit w/ Combat "V"	Navy and Marine Corps Commendation Medal w/ 1 gold 5/16 star	Purple Heart w/ 1 gold 5/16 star
2nd Row	Navy Presidential Unit Citation w/ 2 service stars	China Service Medal	American Defense Service Medal w/ Base clasp	American Campaign Medal
3rd Row	Asiatic-Pacific Campaign Medal w/ 3 service stars	World War II Victory Medal	Navy Occupation Service Medal w/ Asia clasp	National Defense Service Medal w/ 1 service star
4th Row	Vietnam Service Medal w/ 1 service star	National Order of the Republic of Vietnam, 5th Class	Republic of Vietnam Gallantry Cross w/ Palm	Republic of Vietnam Campaign Medal

== Honors ==
Hochmuth Hall, MCIA headquarters building at Marine Corps Base Quantico is named in his honor. An avenue is named after him at MCRD San Diego. The Texas A&M University Corps of Cadets Major General Bruno A. Hochmuth Award and Flag for Military Achievement was established in 1976 in his honor. It is given to the top cadet unit in military achievement.

== Notes ==
Military offices
Preceded by Wood B. Kyle	Commanding General of the 3rd Marine Division; March–November 1967	Succeeded by Louis Metzger
Preceded by Thomas A. Wornham	Commanding General of Marine Corps Recruit Depot San Diego; October–November 1959	Succeeded by Victor H. Krulak
