= Henry Bertram Price =

Captain Henry Bertrand Price

30th Naval Governor of Guam
- In office August 4, 1923 – August 26, 1924
- Preceded by: Adelbert Althouse
- Succeeded by: Alfred Winsor Brown

Personal details
- Born: June 20, 1869 Burlington, Iowa
- Died: September 23, 1941 (aged 72) San Francisco, California
- Spouse: Katherine Banks Price
- Education: United States Naval Academy

Military service
- Allegiance: United States
- Branch/service: United States Navy
- Rank: Captain

Henry Bertrand Price (June 29, 1869 – September 23, 1941) was a United States Navy Captain who served as the 30th Naval Governor of Guam. As a naval officer, he served on many assignments, including with the Bureau of Ordnance. In 1913, he became executive officer of USS Delaware, and two years later commanding officer of USS Melville. Becoming governor in 1923, Price focused on agricultural development, particularly in the region of Mangilao, Guam. He also ordered increased road building and the establishment of the Guam Department of Agriculture.

== Career ==
=== Navy ===
Upon graduating from the United States Naval Academy in 1895, Price became an assistant engineer and an ensign. He became a lieutenant in 1901. With this rank, he served aboard both USS Don Juan de Austria and USS Princeton. In 1907, he served in the Bureau of Ordnance. In 1913, he became the executive officer aboard the battleship USS Delaware. In December 1915, he set sail as the first commanding officer of USS Melville. He was promoted to the rank of Captain in 1917.

=== Governorship ===
Price served as Governor of Guam from August 4, 1923, to August 26, 1924. During his term, he encouraged an increase in self-sufficient farming. He also developed the area of Mangilao, Guam by building a road to the village and ordering the establishment of the Guam Department of Agriculture and a dairy factory there.

== Awards ==
- Navy Cross for actions aboard the USS Dixie off the coast of Ireland during World War 1.

== Personal life ==
In December 1897, Price married Katherine French Banks at St. Andrews Cathedral in Honolulu, Hawaii.

== Legacy ==
The Captain Henry B. Price Elementary School is named in his honor. The school was opened in 1958 and serves grades kindergarten through five; it was named because of Price's push for agricultural development in the area in the 1920s.

Military offices
Preceded by Adelbert Althouse	Naval Governor of Guam; 1923–1924	Succeeded by Alfred Winsor Brown
