= List of United States Marine Corps lieutenant generals from 2000 to 2009 =

Flag of a Marine Corps lieutenant general

The rank of lieutenant general (or three-star general) is the second-highest rank in the United States Marine Corps, and the first to have a specified number of appointments set by statute. It ranks above major general (two-star general) and below general (four-star general).

There have been 45 lieutenant generals in the U.S. Marine Corps from 2000 to 2009, 12 of whom were promoted to four-star general. All 45 achieved that rank while on active duty in the U.S. Marine Corps. Lieutenant generals entered the Marine Corps via several paths: 24 via Naval Reserve Officer Training Corps (NROTC) at a civilian university, 11 via Officer Candidate School (OCS), eight via the United States Naval Academy (USNA), and two via NROTC at a senior military college.

== List of generals ==
Entries in the following list of lieutenant generals are indexed by the numerical order in which each officer was promoted to that rank while on active duty, or by an asterisk (*) if the officer did not serve in that rank while on active duty or was promoted to four-star rank while on active duty. Each entry lists the general's name, date of rank, (Note: Dates of rank are taken, where available, from the U.S. Navy and Marine Corps register of active and retired commissioned officers or the officer's official biography. The date listed is that of the officer's first promotion to lieutenant general. If such a date cannot be found, the next date substituted should be that of the officer's assumption of his/her first three-star appointment. Failing which, the officer's first Senate confirmation date to lieutenant general should be substituted.) active-duty positions held while serving at three-star rank, (Note: Positions listed are those held by the officer when promoted to lieutenant general. Dates listed are for the officer's full tenure, which may predate promotion to three-star rank or postdate retirement from active duty. Positions held in an acting capacity are italicized.) number of years of active-duty service at three-star rank (Yrs), (Note: The number of years of active-duty service at three-star rank is approximated by subtracting the year in the "Date of rank" column from the last year in the "Position" column.) year commissioned and source of commission, (Note: Sources of commission are listed in parentheses after the year of commission and include: the Officer Candidates School (OCS); the United States Naval Academy (USNA); Naval Reserve Officer Training Corps (NROTC) at a civilian university; Reserve Officers' Training Corps (ROTC) at a civilian university; and ROTC at a senior military college such as the Virginia Military Institute (VMI), Texas A&M University (Texas A&M), or The Citadel (Citadel).) number of years in commission when promoted to three-star rank (YC), (Note: The number of years in commission before being promoted to three-star rank is approximated by subtracting the year in the "Commission" column from the year in the "Date of rank" column.) and other biographical notes. (Note: Notes include years of birth and death; awards of the Medal of Honor, Congressional Gold Medal, Presidential Medal of Freedom, or honors of similar significance; major government appointments; university presidencies or equivalents; familial relationships with other significant military officers or significant government officials such as U.S. Presidents, cabinet secretaries, U.S. Senators, or state governors; and unusual career events such as premature relief or death in office. Officers who served as enlisted Marines for 7 years or more prior to commissioning are also noted.)

List of U.S. Marine Corps lieutenant generals from 2000 to 2009
#	Name	Photo	Date of rank	Position	Yrs	Commission	YC	Notes
1	Emil R. Bedard		25 Jun 2000	Deputy Commandant for Plans, Policies, and Operations, Headquarters Marine Corps, 2000–2003.	3	1967 (NROTC)	33	(1943– )
*	William L. Nyland		30 Jun 2000	Deputy Commandant for Programs and Resources, Headquarters Marine Corps, 2000–2001.; Deputy Commandant for Aviation, Headquarters Marine Corps, 2001–2002.	2	1968 (NROTC)	32	(1946– ) (Note: Served as Assistant Commandant of the Marine Corps (ACMC).) Promoted to general, 4 Sep 2002.
2	Michael P. DeLong		7 Sep 2000	Deputy Commander in Chief/Chief of Staff, U.S. Central Command (DCINCCENT), 2000–2002.; Deputy Commander, U.S. Central Command (DCDRUSCENTCOM), 2002–2003.	3	1967 (USNA)	33	(1945–2018)
3	Gregory S. Newbold		10 Oct 2000	Director, Operations, Joint Staff, J3, 2000–2002. (Note: Newbold voluntarily retired in October 2002 in protest of Defense Secretary Donald Rumsfeld's 2003 invasion of Iraq. He was allowed to retire as a lieutenant general despite not fulfilling the necessary time in grade requirements.)	2	1970 (NROTC)	30	(1948– )
*	Michael W. Hagee		1 Nov 2000	Commanding General, I Marine Expeditionary Force, 2000–2002.	3	1968 (USNA)	32	(1944– ) (Note: Served as Commandant of the Marine Corps (CMC).) Promoted to general, 14 Jan 2003.
4	Garry L. Parks		16 May 2001	Commanding General, Marine Corps Recruiting Command (CG MCRC), 1998–2001.; Deputy Commandant for Manpower and Reserve Affairs, Headquarters Marine Corps, 2001–2004.	3	1969 (Citadel)	32	(1947– )
5	Dennis M. McCarthy		1 Jun 2001	Commander, U.S. Marine Forces Reserve (COMMARFORRES), 2001–2004.; Commander, U.S. Marine Forces Reserve/Commander, U.S. Marine Forces North (COMMARFORRES/COMMARFORNORTH), 2004–2005.	4	1967 (NROTC)	34	(1945– ) U.S. Assistant Secretary of Defense for Reserve Affairs, 2009–2011.
6	Edward Hanlon Jr.		11 Jul 2001	Commanding General, Marine Corps Combat Development Command (CG MCCDC), 2001–2002.; Deputy Commandant for Combat Development, Headquarters Marine Corps/Commanding General, Marine Corps Combat Development Command (CG MCCDC), 2002–2004.; U.S. Military Representative, NATO Military Committee (USMILREP), 2004–2006.	5	1967 (OCS)	34	(1944– )
*	Robert Magnus		20 Aug 2001	Deputy Commandant for Programs and Resources, Headquarters Marine Corps, 2001–2005.	4	1969 (NROTC)	32	(1947– ) Promoted to general, 1 Nov 2005.
7	Wallace C. Gregson Jr.		21 Aug 2001	Commanding General, III Marine Expeditionary Force/Commander, Marine Corps Bases Japan/Commander, U.S. Marine Corps Forces, Japan (COMMCBJ/COMMARFORJ), 2001–2003.; Commander, U.S. Marine Corps Forces, Pacific/Commander, U.S. Marine Forces Central Command/Commanding General, Fleet Marine Force, Pacific/Commander, Marine Corps Bases Pacific (COMMARFORPAC/COMUSMARCENT/CG FMFPAC/COMCBPAC), 2003–2005.	4	1968 (USNA)	33	(1946– ) U.S. Assistant Secretary of Defense for Asian and Pacific Security Affairs, 2009–2011.
*	James E. Cartwright		6 May 2002	Director, Joint Force Development, Joint Staff, J7, 2002–2004.; Commander, U.S. Strategic Command (CDRUSSTRATCOM), 2004.	2	1971 (NROTC)	31	(1949– ) (Note: Served as a combatant commander (CCDR).) (Note: Served as Vice Chairman, Joint Chiefs of Staff (VJCS).) Promoted to general, 1 Sep 2004.
8	Richard L. Kelly		7 Jun 2002	Deputy Commandant for Installations and Logistics, Headquarters Marine Corps, 2003–2005.	2	1971 (NROTC) (Note: Enlisted in 1970; commissioned as aviation officer in 1971; redesignated as logistics officer in 1978.)	31	
9	Martin R. Berndt		15 Aug 2002	Commander, U.S. Marine Corps Forces, Atlantic/Commander, U.S. Marine Corps Forces Europe/Commander, U.S. Marine Corps Forces, South/Commander, U.S. Marine Corps Forces, U.S. Strategic Command/Commander, Marine Corps Bases Atlantic/Commanding General, Fleet Marine Force Atlantic/Commanding General, Fleet Marine Force Europe (COMMARFORLANT/COMMARFOREUR/COMMARFOR- SOUTH/COMMARFORSTRAT/COMMCBLANT/CG FMFLANT/CG FMFEUR), 2002–2005.	3	1969 (NROTC)	33	(1948–2011)
10	Gary H. Hughey		24 Sep 2002	Deputy Commander in Chief, U.S. Transportation Command (DCINCTRANS), 2002.; Deputy Commander, U.S. Transportation Command (DCDRUSTRANSCOM), 2002–2005.	3	1970 (NROTC)	32	(1947– )
11	Michael A. Hough		2 Oct 2002	Deputy Commandant for Aviation, Headquarters Marine Corps, 2002–2005.	3	1969 (USNA)	33	(c. 1947– )
*	James T. Conway		2 Dec 2002	Commanding General, I Marine Expeditionary Force, 2002–2004.; Director, Operations, Joint Staff, J3, 2004–2006.	4	1970 (OCS)	32	(1947– ) Promoted to general, 13 Nov 2006.
12	Henry P. Osman		1 May 2003	Commanding General, II Marine Expeditionary Force/Commanding General, Striking Force Atlantic (CG STRIKFORLANT), 2002–2003.; Commanding General, II Marine Expeditionary Force, 2003–2004.; Deputy Commandant for Manpower and Reserve Affairs, Headquarters Marine Corps, 2004–2006.	3	1969 (OCS) (Note: Commissioned as second lieutenant via the Platoon Leaders Course (PLC).)	34	(1947– )
13	Robert R. Blackman Jr.		1 Jul 2003	Commanding General, III Marine Expeditionary Force/Commander, Marine Corps Bases Japan/Commander, U.S. Marine Corps Forces, Japan (COMMCBJ/COMMARFORJ), 2003–2005.; Commander, U.S. Marine Corps Forces Command/Commander, U.S. Marine Corps Forces Europe/Commander, U.S. Marine Corps Forces, South/Commander, Marine Corps Bases Atlantic/Commanding General, Fleet Marine Force Atlantic/Commanding General, Fleet Marine Force Europe (COMMARFORCOM/COMMARFOREUR/COMMARFOR- SOUTH/COMMCBLANT/CG FMFLANT/CG FMFEUR), 2005–2007.	4	1970 (NROTC)	33	(1948– )
14	Robert M. Shea		31 Jul 2003	Director, Command, Control, Communications and Computer Systems, Joint Staff, J6, 2003–2006.	3	1968 (NROTC)	35	(1948– )
15	Jan C. Huly		2 Oct 2003	Deputy Commandant for Plans, Policies, and Operations, Headquarters Marine Corps, 2003–2006.	3	1969 (NROTC)	34	(1948– )
*	James F. Amos		9 Sep 2004	Commanding General, II Marine Expeditionary Force, 2004–2006.; Deputy Commandant for Combat Development, Headquarters Marine Corps/Commanding General, Marine Corps Combat Development Command/Commanding General, Marine Corps National Capital Region/Commander, U.S. Marine Corps Forces, U.S. Strategic Command (CG MCCDC/CG MCNCRC/COMMARFORSTRAT), 2006–2008.	4	1970 (NROTC)	34	(1946– ) Promoted to general, 2 Jul 2008.
16	John F. Sattler		12 Sep 2004	Commanding General, I Marine Expeditionary Force, 2004–2005.; Commander, U.S. Marine Forces Central Command/Commanding General, I Marine Expeditionary Force (COMMARCENT), 2005–2006.; Director, Strategic Plans and Policy, Joint Staff, J5, 2006–2008.	4	1971 (USNA)	33	(1949– )
*	James N. Mattis		4 Nov 2004	Deputy Commandant for Combat Development, Headquarters Marine Corps/Commanding General, Marine Corps Combat Development Command (CG MCCDC), 2004–2006.; Commander, U.S. Marine Forces Central Command/Commanding General, I Marine Expeditionary Force (COMMARCENT), 2006–2007.	3	1972 (ROTC)	32	(1950– ) (Note: Served as Supreme Allied Commander Transformation (SACT).) Promoted to general, 9 Nov 2007. U.S. Secretary of Defense, 2017–2019.
17	John W. Bergman		10 Jun 2005	Commander, U.S. Marine Forces Reserve/Commander, U.S. Marine Forces North (COMMARFORRES/COMMARFORNORTH), 2005–2009.	4	1969 (OCS)	36	(1947– ) U.S. Representative from Michigan's 1st congressional district, 2017–present.
18	John F. Goodman		3 Aug 2005	Commander, U.S. Marine Corps Forces, Pacific/Commanding General, Fleet Marine Force, Pacific/Commander, Marine Corps Bases Pacific (COMMARFORPAC/CG FMFPAC/COMCBPAC), 2005–2008.	3	1971 (USA)	34	(1945– ) (Note: Transferred to U.S. Marine Corps from U.S. Army Reserve, 1971.)
19	Joseph F. Weber		30 Aug 2005	Commanding General, III Marine Expeditionary Force/Commander, Marine Corps Bases Japan/Commander, U.S. Marine Corps Forces, Japan (COMMCBJ/COMMARFORJ), 2005–2007.; Commander, U.S. Marine Corps Forces Command/Commander, U.S. Marine Corps Forces Europe/Commander, U.S. Marine Corps Forces, South/Commander, Marine Corps Bases Atlantic/Commanding General, Fleet Marine Force Atlantic/Commanding General, Fleet Marine Force Europe (COMMARFORCOM/COMMARFOREUR/COMMARFOR- SOUTH/COMMCBLANT/CG FMFLANT/CG FMFEUR), 2007–2008.	3	1972 (Texas A&M)	33	(1950– ) Executive Director, Texas Department of Transportation, 2014–2016.
20	Emerson N. Gardner Jr.		1 Sep 2005	Deputy Commandant for Programs and Resources, Headquarters Marine Corps, 2005–2007.; Principal Deputy Director, Cost Assessment and Program Evaluation, Office of the Secretary of Defense, 2007–2010.; Director, Cost Assessment and Program Evaluation, Office of the Secretary of Defense, 2010.	5	1978 (NROTC)	27	(1951–2022)
21	Richard S. Kramlich		15 Sep 2005	Deputy Commandant for Installations and Logistics, Headquarters Marine Corps, 2005–2008.; Director, Marine Corps Staff (DMCS), 2008–2009.	4	1973 (USNA)	32	
22	John G. Castellaw		3 Nov 2005	Deputy Commandant for Aviation, Headquarters Marine Corps, 2005–2007.	2	1972 (NROTC)	33	
23	Frances C. Wilson		14 Jul 2006	President, National Defense University (P-NDU), 2006–2009.	3	1972 (NROTC)	34	(1948– )
24	Keith J. Stalder		2 Aug 2006	Commanding General, II Marine Expeditionary Force, 2006–2008.; Commander, U.S. Marine Corps Forces, Pacific/Commanding General, Fleet Marine Force, Pacific/Commander, Marine Corps Bases Pacific (COMMARFORPAC/CG FMFPAC/COMCBPAC), 2008–2010.	4	1973 (OCS)	33	
25	Ronald S. Coleman		27 Oct 2006	Deputy Commandant for Manpower and Reserve Affairs, Headquarters Marine Corps, 2006–2009.	3	1974 (NROTC)	32	(1948– )
26	Richard F. Natonski		7 Nov 2006	Deputy Commandant for Plans, Policies and Operations, Headquarters Marine Corps, 2006–2008.; Commander, U.S. Marine Corps Forces Command/Commander, U.S. Marine Corps Forces Europe/Commander, Marine Corps Bases Atlantic/Commanding General, Fleet Marine Force Atlantic (COMMARFORCOM/COMMARFOREUR/COMMCBLANT/CG FMFLANT), 2008–2010.	4	1973 (NROTC)	33	(1951– )
27	George J. Trautman III		8 Jun 2007	Deputy Commandant for Aviation, Headquarters Marine Corps, 2007–2011.	4	1974 (NROTC)	33	(1952– )
28	Richard C. Zilmer		16 Jun 2007	Commanding General, III Marine Expeditionary Force/Commander, Marine Corps Bases Japan/Commander, U.S. Marine Corps Forces, Japan (COMMCBJ/COMMARFORJ), 2007–2009.; Deputy Commandant for Manpower and Reserve Affairs, Headquarters Marine Corps, 2009–2011.	4	1974 (NROTC)	30	
29	Samuel T. Helland		5 Nov 2007	Commanding General, I Marine Expeditionary Force, 2007–2009.	2	1973 (OCS)	34	(c. 1951– ) (Note: Served with U.S. Army Special Forces, 1968–1971.)
*	John M. Paxton Jr.		13 Mar 2008	Director, Strategic Plans and Policy, Joint Staff, J5, 2008.; Director, Operations, Joint Staff, J3, 2008–2011.; Commander, U.S. Marine Forces Africa/Commanding General, II Marine Expeditionary Force (COMMARFORAF), 2011–2012.; Commander, U.S. Marine Corps Forces Command/Commander, U.S. Marine Corps Forces Europe/Commanding General, Fleet Marine Force Atlantic (COMMARFORCOM/COMMARFOREUR/CG FMFLANT), 2012.	4	1974 (OCS)	34	(1951– ) Promoted to general, 15 Dec 2012.
30	Duane D. Thiessen		29 Apr 2008	Deputy Commandant for Programs and Resources, Headquarters Marine Corps, 2008–2010.; Commander, U.S. Marine Corps Forces, Pacific/Commanding General, Fleet Marine Force, Pacific/Commander, Marine Corps Bases Pacific (COMMARFORPAC/CG FMFPAC/COMCBPAC), 2010–2011.; Commander, U.S. Marine Corps Forces, Pacific/Commanding General, Fleet Marine Force, Pacific (COMMARFORPAC/CG FMFPAC), 2011–2012.	4	1974 (NROTC)	34	(1951– ) Inspector General of the Marine Corps, 2002–2004.
31	George J. Flynn		23 Jul 2008	Deputy Commandant for Combat Development and Integration, Headquarters Marine Corps/Commanding General, Marine Corps Combat Development Command (CG MCCDC), 2008–2010.; Commander, U.S. Marine Corps Forces Cyberspace Command (COMMARFORCYBERCOM), 2010–2011.; Director, Joint Force Development, Joint Staff, J7, 2011–2013.	5	1975 (USNA)	33	(c. 1954– )
32	Dennis J. Hejlik		25 Jul 2008	Commander, U.S. Marine Forces Africa/Commanding General, II Marine Expeditionary Force (COMMARFORAF), 2008–2010.; Commander, U.S. Marine Corps Forces Command/Commander, U.S. Marine Corps Forces Europe/Commander, Marine Corps Bases Atlantic/Commanding General, Fleet Marine Force Atlantic (COMMARFORCOM/COMMARFOREUR/COMMCBLANT/CG FMFLANT), 2010–2011.; Commander, U.S. Marine Corps Forces Command/Commander, U.S. Marine Corps Forces Europe/Commanding General, Fleet Marine Force Atlantic (COMMARFORCOM/COMMARFOREUR/CG FMFLANT), 2011–2012.	4	1975 (OCS)	33	(c. 1950– )
*	Joseph F. Dunford Jr.		8 Aug 2008	Deputy Commandant for Plans, Policies and Operations, Headquarters Marine Corps, 2008–2009.; Commander, U.S. Marine Forces Central Command/Commanding General, I Marine Expeditionary Force (COMMARCENT), 2009–2010.	2	1977 (OCS)	31	(1955– ) (Note: Promoted directly from rank of brigadier general.) (Note: Served as Commander, International Security Assistance Force (CDRISAF).) (Note: Served as Chairman, Joint Chiefs of Staff (CJCS).) Promoted to general, 23 Oct 2010.
*	John R. Allen		31 Oct 2008	Deputy Commander, U.S. Central Command (DCDRUSCENTCOM), 2008–2011.; Commander, U.S. Central Command (CDRUSCENTCOM), 2010.	3	1976 (USNA)	32	(1953– ) Promoted to general, 18 Jul 2011. Special Presidential Envoy for the Global Coalition to Counter the Islamic State of Iraq and the Levant, 2014–2015; President, Brookings Institution, 2017–2022.
33	Willie J. Williams		31 Jul 2009	Director, Marine Corps Staff (DMCS), 2009–2013.	4	1974 (NROTC)	35	(1951– )
34	Terry G. Robling		Sep 2009	Commanding General, III Marine Expeditionary Force/Commander, Marine Corps Bases Japan/Commander, U.S. Marine Corps Forces, Japan (COMMCBJ/COMMARFORJ), 2009–2011.; Deputy Commandant for Aviation, Headquarters Marine Corps, 2011–2012.; Commander, U.S. Marine Corps Forces, Pacific/Commanding General, Fleet Marine Force, Pacific (COMMARFORPAC/CG FMFPAC), 2012–2014.	5	1976 (NROTC)	33	(1954– )
*	Thomas D. Waldhauser		25 Sep 2009	Deputy Commandant for Plans, Policies and Operations, Headquarters Marine Corps, 2009–2010.; Commander, U.S. Marine Forces Central Command/Commanding General, I Marine Expeditionary Force (COMMARCENT), 2010–2012.; Senior Military Assistant to the Secretary of Defense (SMA SecDef), 2012–2013.; Director, Joint Force Development, Joint Staff, J7, 2013–2016.	7	1976 (OCS)	33	(1953– ) Promoted to general, 18 Jul 2016.
35	Frank A. Panter Jr.		25 Sep 2009	Deputy Commandant for Installations and Logistics, Headquarters Marine Corps, 2009–2012.	3	1975 (NROTC)	34	
*	John F. Kelly		17 Oct 2009	Commander, U.S. Marine Forces Reserve/Commander, U.S. Marine Forces North (COMMARFORRES/COMMARFORNORTH), 2009–2011.; Senior Military Assistant to the Secretary of Defense (SMA SecDef), 2011–2012.	3	1976 (OCS) (Note: Enlisted in 1970; commissioned as infantry officer in 1976.)	33	(1950– ) Promoted to general, 19 Nov 2012. U.S. Secretary of Homeland Security, 2017; White House Chief of Staff, 2017–2019.

== History ==
=== World War I ===
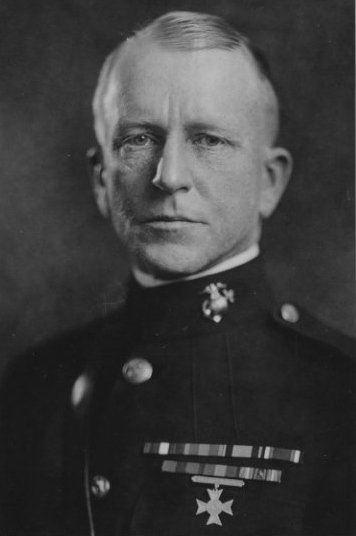
James C. Breckinridge

The rank of lieutenant general in the Marine Corps was first proposed in 1918, when the Senate Naval Affairs Committee tried to increase the rank of the major general commandant and his three senior staff officers for the duration of World War I. Instigated by the incumbent commandant, George Barnett, the proposal was blocked by Navy secretary Josephus Daniels and House Naval Affairs Committee member Thomas S. Butler, who was outraged that the headquarters staff would gain a lieutenant general commandant and three major generals at a time when no Marine major generals were deployed in the field. The incident contributed to Daniels' decision to remove Barnett midway through his second term as commandant.

A decade later, Butler himself tried to promote Barnett's successor as commandant, John A. Lejeune, to lieutenant general to match the three-star rank proposed for Army corps area commanders in 1928. The Navy had four admirals and three vice admirals, but the highest active-duty Army rank was only major general, so the War Department asked Congress to raise the ex officio ranks of the Army chief of staff and three overseas department commanders to general and nine corps area commanders to lieutenant general. At the President's behest, the House Military Affairs Committee approved only the four-star promotion for the chief of staff. Since the Army still had no lieutenant generals and Navy secretary Curtis D. Wilbur felt the commandant was not equivalent to a three-star fleet commander in the Navy, Lejeune's promotion died in committee.

In 1925, Congress authorized Marine Corps officers to retire with a tombstone promotion to the rank but not the retired pay of the next higher grade if they were specially commended for performance of duty in actual combat during World War I, but only if they retired because they were too old to be promoted further, a condition that excluded major generals, who already held the highest grade in the Marine Corps. Congress expanded eligibility in 1938 to cover officers with a qualifying combat citation from any time period who retired for any reason, allowing James C. Breckinridge to become the first three-star Marine when he retired with a tombstone promotion to lieutenant general in October 1941. Lejeune lobbied Congress to extend tombstone promotions to officers who had retired before 1938, and finally received his third star in April 1942.

=== World War II ===
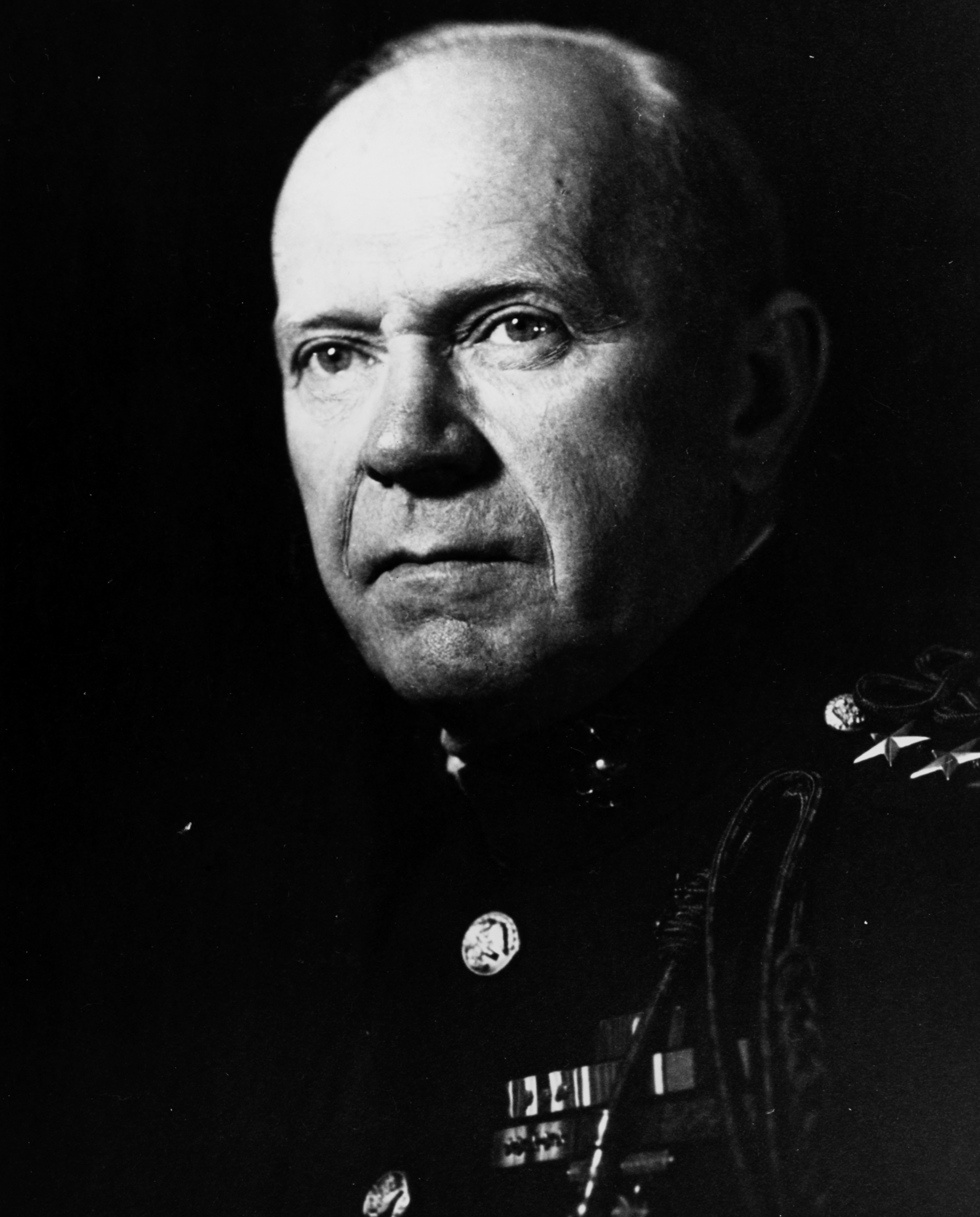
Thomas Holcomb

In January 1942, following the United States entry into World War II, Congress increased the commandant's rank to lieutenant general, making Thomas Holcomb the first three-star Marine to serve on active duty. Holcomb's superior, chief of naval operations Ernest J. King, opposed promoting more Marines to that rank, but King relented after Alexander A. Vandegrift, recently awarded the Medal of Honor for the Battle of Guadalcanal, was assigned to command the first Marine amphibious corps and slated to succeed Holcomb as commandant. Vandegrift was appointed temporary lieutenant general in July 1943, under a 1941 law that anticipated the wartime expansion of the Marine Corps by authorizing an unlimited number of temporary general officers for the duration of the national emergency.

When Vandegrift returned to the United States to become commandant in January 1944, King rejected Holcomb's bid to maintain a three-star Marine in the Pacific theater by promoting the other amphibious corps commander, Holland M. Smith, who had led the ground forces at the Battle of Tarawa. Smith received his third star only after the naval commanders at Tarawa, Raymond A. Spruance and Richmond K. Turner, were rewarded with promotions in March 1944.

Unlike Holcomb, whose three-star rank was an aspect of his office of commandant, Vandegrift and Smith held personal three-star grades that followed them regardless of assignment, as did every other temporary lieutenant general appointed before the Officer Personnel Act of 1947 made all three-star ranks ex officio. For example, upon relinquishing his final command in May 1946, Smith remained a lieutenant general for the three months until he actually retired, whereas a postwar lieutenant general would have reverted immediately to his permanent two-star grade. Early promotions to these wartime grades therefore rewarded past personal triumphs—Guadalcanal for Vandegrift and Tarawa for Smith—as much as future organizational efficiency.

By the end of the war, the commandant was a full general. One lieutenant general commanded Marines deployed overseas under Fleet Marine Force, Pacific, and a second lieutenant general commanded Marines being readied for deployment under Marine Training and Replacement Command. A third lieutenant general was appointed in January 1947 to command the new Fleet Marine Force, Atlantic.

=== Postwar ===
The Officer Personnel Act of 1947 authorized only two lieutenant generals for the Marine Corps after 1 July 1948, except during war or national emergency. All active-duty ranks above major general were temporary and ex officio, so upon vacating an office carrying three-star rank, an officer reverted to his permanent two-star grade unless he retired. The two lieutenant generals were assigned to command the operating forces in the Pacific and Atlantic.

The permanent peacetime limit of two lieutenant generals was imposed during the post-World War II drawdown, but remained in place even as the Marine Corps expanded during the Cold War. The state of emergency declared for the Korean War on 16 December 1950, allowed a third lieutenant general to serve as assistant commandant and chief of staff of the Marine Corps, and a fourth as commandant of Marine Corps Schools. A fifth lieutenant general was assigned to Headquarters Marine Corps as director of aviation in 1953, but its three-star designation shifted to the chief of staff when that job was separated from assistant commandant in 1957.

Congress finally declared in 1977 that up to 15 percent of all active-duty Marine Corps general officers could be lieutenant generals or generals even without an emergency, after the 1976 National Emergencies Act terminated all existing national emergencies, effective 14 September 1978, which would have eliminated five of the seven lieutenant generals then on active duty.

=== Tombstone promotions ===
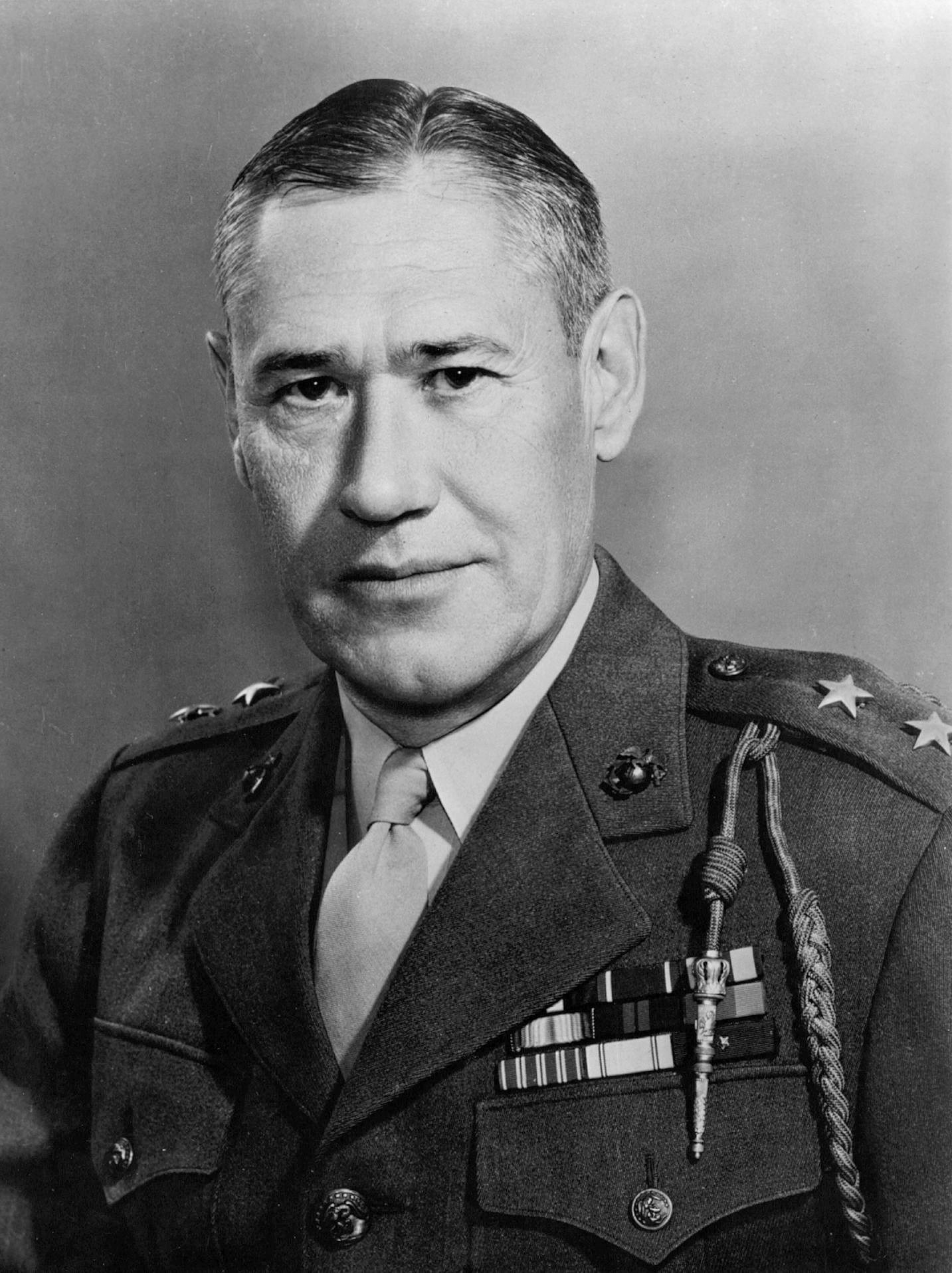
Keller E. Rockey

From 1938 to 1959, Marine officers who were specially commended for the performance of duty in actual combat before the end of World War II could retire with the rank but not the pay of the next higher grade. Such honorary increases in rank at retirement were called tombstone promotions, since their only tangible benefit was the right to carve the higher rank on one's tombstone. Tombstone promotions made James C. Breckinridge the first three-star Marine in October 1941, and Thomas Holcomb the first four-star Marine in January 1944.

A lieutenant general could only receive a tombstone promotion to four-star general if he still held a three-star job on the day he retired. When Oliver P. Smith was abruptly ordered to relinquish his three-star command on 1 September 1955, and revert to major general for the two months until his statutory retirement, he moved up his retirement date to September 1 and kept his tombstone promotion to general.

Of the 27 lieutenant generals appointed before Congress ended tombstone promotions on 1 November 1959, all but five were promoted to general, either by tombstone promotion, selection as commandant, or posthumous legislation, in the case of Roy S. Geiger, who died only a week before he was scheduled to retire with a tombstone promotion. The exceptions were Keller E. Rockey and Robert H. Pepper, who preferred to revert to major general rather than retire at the end of their three-star assignments; Thomas E. Watson, who relinquished command of Fleet Marine Force, Pacific for an assignment at Headquarters Marine Corps, but retired for ill health only three months later; Merwin H. Silverthorn, who was too young to retire for age when his three-star assignment ended and Congress had suspended early retirements; and Verne J. McCaul, who chose to sacrifice a fourth star to stay on active duty until the new commandant took office two months after tombstone promotions ended.

=== Commandant successions ===
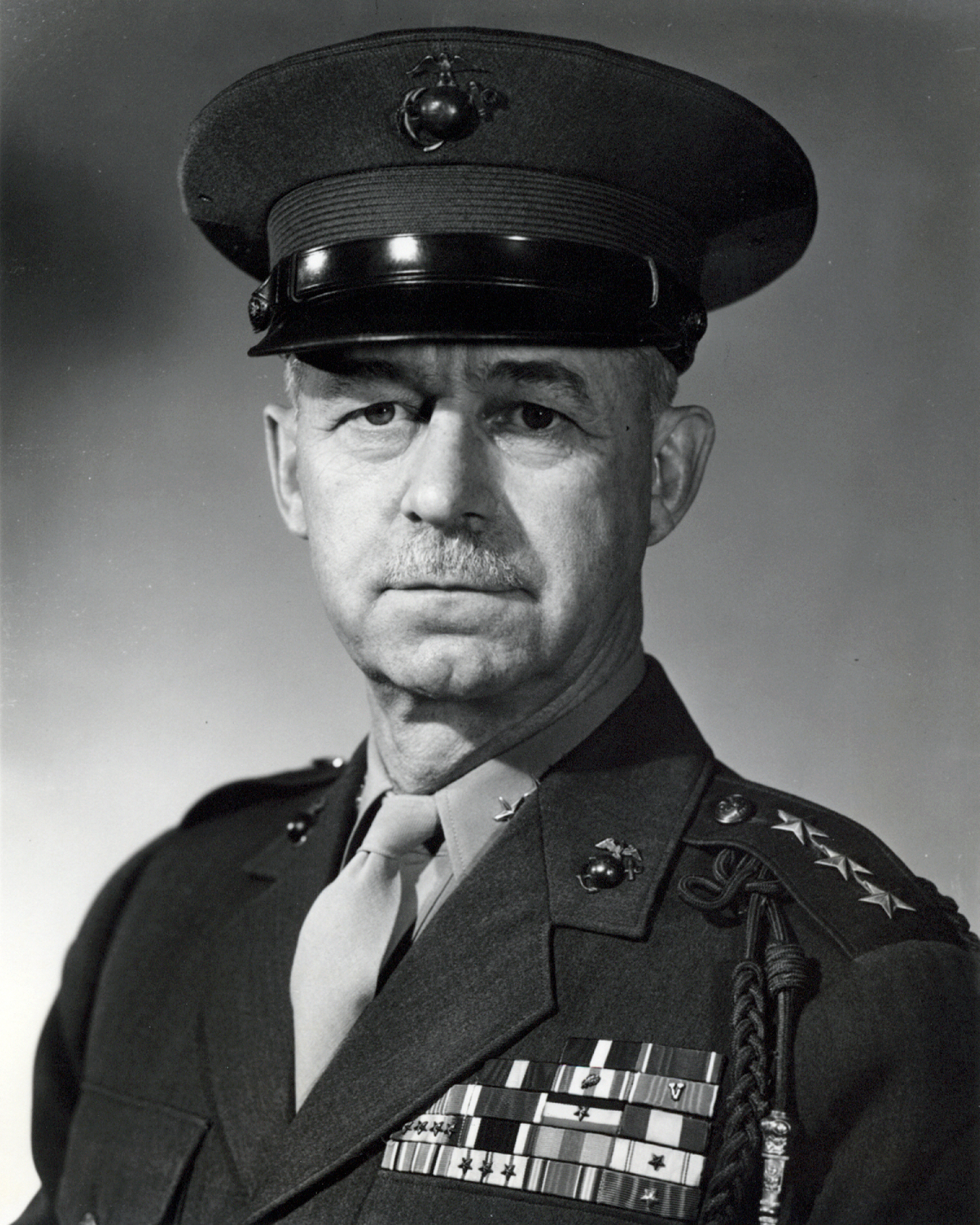
Merwin H. Silverthorn

Lieutenant general appointments were inextricably tied to the politics of commandant succession. Any lieutenant general was a viable candidate for commandant if he was young enough to complete a full four-year term before reaching the statutory retirement age of 62, as were prominent major generals.

A commandant tended to appoint lieutenant generals in two waves, one at the start of his term and one in the middle. The first wave filled three-star positions vacated by the newly appointed commandant and any rivals who chose to retire after being passed over. For example, Allen H. Turnage retired after a major general, Clifton B. Cates, was selected to be commandant in 1947, as did all five lieutenant generals after another major general, David M. Shoup, was selected in 1959. An incoming commandant might also choose not to retain his predecessor's lieutenant generals, to clear space for his own favorites. Of the five lieutenant generals who retired at Shoup's accession, at least two, Verne J. McCaul and Robert E. Hogaboom, only did so after he made clear they would not be continued at that rank. Upon succeeding Cates in 1952, Lemuel C. Shepherd Jr. promptly appointed Gerald C. Thomas to be his assistant commandant and chief of staff, sending Cates' appointee, Merwin H. Silverthorn, to a two-star job until retirement.

From the middle of his term, a commandant's choices for lieutenant general were meant to set up his preferred candidates to succeed him and eliminate others from consideration. When picking a commandant in 1947, President Harry S. Truman judged Cates and Shepherd to be equally qualified. Since Cates was senior, Truman appointed Cates first and promised to appoint Shepherd next. Cates duly appointed Shepherd to the next three-star vacancy, but when Oliver P. Smith returned to the United States in 1951 after famously commanding the 1st Marine Division at the Battle of Chosin Reservoir, Cates gave Smith another two-star command instead of the three-star promotion many expected, reducing the risk that Smith's popularity might derail Shepherd's succession. Smith finally received his third star two years later, after he was too old to be considered for commandant.

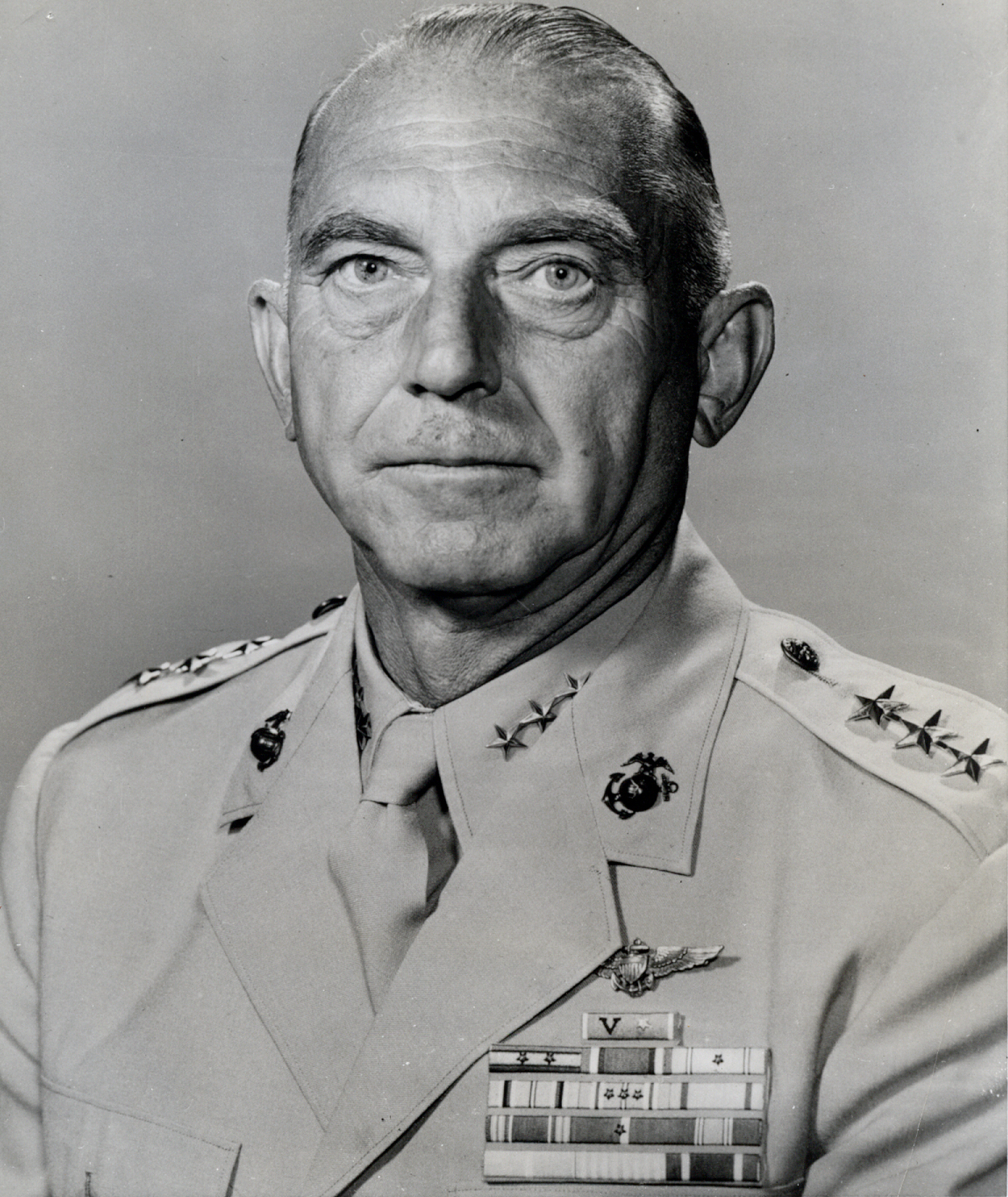
Verne J. McCaul

When Cates stepped down as commandant, he had to stay on active duty because a 1951 law froze voluntary officer retirements by withholding retired pay from any regular officer who retired for any reason other than age, disability, hardship, or the best interests of the service. (When Graves B. Erskine retired early to accept a civilian position in the Department of Defense in 1953, Congress had to pass special legislation to exempt him.) At Cates' request, Shepherd gave him the three-star job commanding Marine Corps Schools, repaying his support for Shepherd's succession. Congress repealed the law in 1954 and Cates retired two months later. Shepherd picked Thomas to succeed Cates, which simultaneously avoided creating another rival for the commandancy, since Thomas was too old to be considered, and freed Thomas' three-star job of assistant commandant and chief of staff for Shepherd's preferred candidate, Randolph M. Pate, who eventually did succeed Shepherd.

All such machinations failed when Pate's successor was selected in 1959. The best positioned three-star candidate, Merrill B. Twining, was viewed as too political by the secretary of defense, Thomas S. Gates Jr., who passed over all five lieutenant generals to recommend Shoup instead. Four of the five lieutenant generals collected tombstone promotions to general by retiring on 1 November 1959, the day the tombstone promotion law expired, but Verne J. McCaul chose to remain on duty until Shoup took office on 1 January 1960.

== Legislative history ==
The following list of Congressional legislation includes all acts of Congress pertaining to appointments to the grade of lieutenant general in the United States Marine Corps from 2000 to 2009. (Note: Legislative history compiled from the U.S. Congress official website and U.S. Government Publishing Office official website.)

Each entry lists an act of Congress, its citation in the United States Statutes at Large, and a summary of the act's relevance, with officers affected by the act bracketed where applicable. Positions listed without reference to rank are assumed to be eligible for officers of three-star grade or higher.

List of legislation on appointments of lieutenant generals from 2000 to 2009
Legislation	Citation	Summary
Act of October 30, 2000 [Floyd D. Spence National Defense Authorization Act for Fiscal Year 2001]	114 Stat. 1654A–104; 114 Stat. 1654A–105; 114 Stat. 1654A–106	Raised statutory rank of the chief of Marine Forces Reserve, under standard promotion procedures, to lieutenant general (Dennis M. McCarthy).; Repealed special requirement for senior reserve component officers, (Note: referring to the chiefs of service reserve components (Army Reserve, Marine Forces Reserve, Naval Reserve, and Air Force Reserve) and directors of the Army and Air National Guard) per Section 12505 of Title 10, for appointment to grade of lieutenant general.; Increased percentage of general officers in the Marine Corps that may be appointed above grade of major general from 15% to 16.2%.
Act of December 2, 2002 [Bob Stump National Defense Authorization Act for Fiscal Year 2003]	116 Stat. 2487; 116 Stat. 2525	Established a Department of Defense Test Resource Management Center and assigned director statutory grade of lieutenant general or vice admiral.; Exempted the senior military assistant to the secretary of defense from number and percentage limitations on general or flag officers, if serving in grade of lieutenant general or vice admiral.
Act of January 6, 2006 [National Defense Authorization Act for Fiscal Year 2006]	119 Stat. 3226	Prohibited frocking of officers below grade of major general or rear admiral to grades above major general or rear admiral.
Act of January 28, 2008 [National Defense Authorization Act for Fiscal Year 2008]	122 Stat. 94; 122 Stat. 115; 122 Stat. 278	Increased percentage of general or flag officers that may be appointed above grade of major general or rear admiral from 15.7% to 16.3%.; Allowed officers serving in grade of lieutenant general, general, vice admiral, or admiral to continue holding such position for up to 60 days following reassignment from such position, unless placed sooner in another designated position.; Made position of principal military deputy to the assistant secretary of the Navy (research, development and acquisition) statutory, to be selected from active duty vice admirals of the Navy and lieutenant generals of the Marine Corps.
Act of October 14, 2008 [Duncan Hunter National Defense Authorization Act for Fiscal Year 2009]	122 Stat. 4433; 122 Stat. 4435; 122 Stat. 4436	Increased percentage of general officers in the Marine Corps that may be appointed above grade of major general from 17.5% to 19%.; Revised cap on total number of authorized Marine Corps general officers to be reduced to 160, of which 15 may be appointed above grade of major general pending a congressional report by the secretary of defense.; Authorized the secretary of defense to designate up to 68 officers above grade of major general or rear admiral for joint duty assignments.
Act of October 28, 2009 [National Defense Authorization Act for Fiscal Year 2010]	123 Stat. 2273	Capped total number of Marine Corps general officers who may be appointed above grade of major general at 15, of whom not more than two to be above grade of lieutenant general, pursuant to changes made under NDAA 2009.

== See also ==
- Lieutenant general (United States)
- General officers in the United States
- List of active duty United States four-star officers
- List of active duty United States three-star officers
- List of United States Marine Corps four-star generals
- List of United States Marine Corps lieutenant generals on active duty before 1960
- List of United States Marine Corps lieutenant generals since 2010
- List of United States military leaders by rank
- Staff (military)
