= List of United States Marine Corps lieutenant generals on active duty before 1960 =

This is a complete list of United States Marine Corps lieutenant generals on active duty before 1960. The grade of lieutenant general (or three-star general) is the second-highest in the Marine Corps, ranking above major general (two-star general) and below general (four-star general).

The active-duty rank of lieutenant general was first granted to the commandant of the Marine Corps in January 1942, shortly after the United States entered World War II. A second lieutenant general was appointed in July 1943 to oversee Marines operating in the Pacific theater, and by 1960 there were five lieutenant generals on active duty. Many major generals received honorary tombstone promotions to lieutenant general when they retired, having been specially commended for performance of duty in actual combat before the end of World War II, but most never served in that grade while on active duty. Tombstone promotions were abolished effective November 1, 1959.

== Taxonomy ==
- A permanent lieutenant general was an officer who held the permanent grade of lieutenant general personally, regardless of assignment. Appointments to this permanent grade were made only on the retired list.
- A temporary lieutenant general was an officer who held the temporary grade of lieutenant general under some condition, such as while serving in a particular job or for the duration of the World War II national emergency, reverting to a lower permanent grade when the condition was over.
- A commandant of the Marine Corps with rank of lieutenant general was an officer who held the ex officio rank of lieutenant general while serving as commandant of the Marine Corps between 1942 and 1945.
- A tombstone lieutenant general was a major general who retired with the rank but not the pay of the next higher grade as a reward for being specially commended for the performance of duty in actual combat before the end of World War II. Most such officers never served as lieutenant generals while on active duty. Tombstone promotions were abolished in 1959.

== List of U.S. Marine Corps lieutenant generals on active duty before 1960 ==
The following list of lieutenant generals includes all officers of the United States Marine Corps who served on active duty in that rank before January 1, 1960, including officers who received a tombstone promotion to lieutenant general if they were recalled to active duty in that rank.

Entries are indexed by the numerical order in which each officer was appointed to that rank while on active duty. Each entry lists the officer's name, date appointed, date the officer vacated the active-duty rank, number of years on active duty as lieutenant general (Yrs), positions held as lieutenant general, and other biographical notes.

Italics denote active duty as lieutenant general while on the retired list.

The list is sortable by active-duty appointment order, last name, date appointed, date vacated, and number of years on active duty as lieutenant general.

	Name	Photo	Date appointed	Date vacated	Yrs	Position	Notes
1	Thomas Holcomb		20 Jan 1942	31 Dec 1943	2	Commandant of the Marine Corps, 1942–1943.	(1879–1965) Major General Commandant of the Marine Corps, 1 Dec 1936–20 Jan 1942; retired as general, 1 Jan 1944.
2	Alexander A. Vandegrift		31 Jul 1943	21 Mar 1945	2	Commanding General, I Marine Amphibious Corps, 1943.; Commandant of the Marine Corps, 1944–1947.	(1887–1973) Commandant of the Marine Corps, with rank of general, 21 Mar 1945–31 Dec 1947. Awarded Medal of Honor, 1943.
3	Holland M. Smith		28 Feb 1944	1 Aug 1946	2	Commanding General, V Amphibious Corps, 1943–1944.; Commanding General, Fleet Marine Force, Pacific, 1944–1945.; Commanding General, Marine Training and Replacement Command, 1945–1946.	(1882–1967) Retired as general, 1 Aug 1946.
4	Roy S. Geiger		19 Jun 1945	23 Jan 1947	2	Commanding General, Tenth Army, 1945.; Commanding General, Fleet Marine Force, Pacific, 1945–1946.	(1885–1947) Died in office, 23 Jan 1947; promoted posthumously to general.
5	Harry Schmidt		1 Mar 1946	1 Jul 1948	2	Deputy Commander, Marine Training and Replacement Command, 1946.; Commanding General, Marine Training and Replacement Command, 1946–1948.	(1886–1968) Retired as general, 1 Jul 1948.
6	Allen H. Turnage		4 Oct 1946	1 Jan 1948	1	Assistant to the Commandant of the Marine Corps, 1945–1946.; Commanding General, Fleet Marine Force, Pacific, 1946–1948.	(1891–1971) Retired as general, 1 Jan 1948.
7	Keller E. Rockey		1 Jan 1947	1 Jul 1949	3	Commanding General, Fleet Marine Force, Atlantic, 1947–1949.	(1888–1970)
8	Thomas E. Watson		1 Jan 1948	24 Apr 1950	2	Commanding General, Fleet Marine Force, Pacific, 1948–1950.	(1892–1966)
9	LeRoy P. Hunt		1 Jul 1949	1 Jul 1951	2	Commanding General, Fleet Marine Force, Atlantic, 1949–1951.	(1892–1968) Retired as general, 1 Jul 1951.
10	Lemuel C. Shepherd Jr.		16 Jun 1950	1 Jan 1952	2	Commanding General, Fleet Marine Force, Pacific, 1950–1952.	(1896–1990) Commandant of the Marine Corps, with rank of general, 1 Jan 1952–31 Dec 1955.
11	Franklin A. Hart		22 Feb 1951	1 Aug 1954	3	Commandant, Marine Corps Schools, 1950–1952.; Commanding General, Fleet Marine Force, Pacific, 1952–1954.	(1894–1967) Retired as general, 1 Aug 1954.
12	Merwin H. Silverthorn		22 Feb 1951	1 Feb 1952	1	Assistant Commandant of the Marine Corps/Chief of Staff, Headquarters Marine Corps, 1950–1952.	(1896–1985)
*	William E. Riley		1 Jun 1951	23 Jun 1953	2	Chief of Staff, United Nations Truce Supervision Organization, 1948–1953.	(1897–1970)
13	Graves B. Erskine		2 Jul 1951	1 Jul 1953	2	Commanding General, Fleet Marine Force, Atlantic, 1951–1953.	(1897–1973) Retired as general, 1 Jul 1953.
14	Clifton B. Cates		1 Jan 1952	30 Jun 1954	2	Commandant, Marine Corps Schools, 1952–1954.	(1893–1970) Commandant of the Marine Corps, with rank of general, 1 Jan 1948–31 Dec 1951; retired as general, 30 Jun 1954.
15	Gerald C. Thomas		8 Mar 1952	1 Jan 1956	4	Assistant Commandant of the Marine Corps/Chief of Staff, Headquarters Marine Corps, 1952–1954.; Commandant, Marine Corps Schools, 1954–1956.	(1894–1984) Retired as general, 1 Jan 1956.
16	Oliver P. Smith		23 Jul 1953	1 Sep 1955	2	Commanding General, Fleet Marine Force, Atlantic, 1953–1955.	(1893–1977) Retired as general, 1 Sep 1955.
17	William O. Brice		28 Aug 1953	1 Sep 1956	3	Assistant Commandant for Air, U.S. Marine Corps/Director of Aviation/Assistant Chief of Naval Operations for Marine Aviation, 1952–1955.; Commanding General, Fleet Marine Force, Pacific, 1955–1956.	(1898–1972) Retired as general, 1 Sep 1956.
18	Randolph M. Pate		1 Jul 1954	1 Jan 1956	2	Assistant Commandant of the Marine Corps/Chief of Staff, Headquarters Marine Corps, 1954–1956.	(1898–1961) Commandant of the Marine Corps, with rank of general, 1 Jan 1956–31 Dec 1959.
19	Robert H. Pepper		2 Aug 1954; Jul 1960; Feb 1962; Aug 1964	9 Sep 1955; Aug 1961; Jul 1963; Nov 1964	4	Commanding General, Fleet Marine Force, Pacific, 1954–1955.; Member, Ad Hoc Committee to Study and Revise the Officer Personnel Act of 1947, 1960–1961.; Senior Member, Headquarters Marine Corps Reorganization Board, 1961.; Member, Gorham Military Pay Study Group, 1962–1963.; Chairman, Woman Marine Program Study Group, 1964.	(1895–1968)
20	Christian F. Schilt		1 Aug 1955	1 Apr 1957	2	Assistant Commandant for Air, U.S. Marine Corps/Director of Aviation/Assistant Chief of Naval Operations for Marine Aviation, 1955–1957.	(1895–1987) Retired as general, 1 Apr 1957. Awarded Medal of Honor, 1928.
21	Alfred H. Noble		1 Sep 1955	1 Nov 1956	1	Commanding General, Fleet Marine Force, Atlantic, 1955–1956.	(1894–1983) Retired as general, 1 Nov 1956.
22	Vernon E. Megee		1 Jan 1956	1 Nov 1959	4	Assistant Commandant of the Marine Corps/Chief of Staff, Headquarters Marine Corps, 1956–1957.; Commanding General, Fleet Marine Force, Pacific, 1957–1959.	(1900–1992) Retired as general, 1 Nov 1959.
23	Edwin A. Pollock		1 Jan 1956	1 Nov 1959	4	Commandant, Marine Corps Schools, 1956.; Commanding General, Fleet Marine Force, Pacific, 1956–1957.; Commanding General, Fleet Marine Force, Atlantic, 1957–1959.	(1899–1982) Retired as general, 1 Nov 1959.
24	Merrill B. Twining		12 Sep 1956	31 Oct 1959	3	Commandant, Marine Corps Schools, 1956–1959.	(1902–1996) Retired as general, 31 Oct 1959.
25	Ray A. Robinson		1 Nov 1956	1 Nov 1957	1	Commanding General, Fleet Marine Force, Atlantic, 1956–1957.	(1896–1976) Retired as general, 1 Nov 1957.
26	Verne J. McCaul		1 Apr 1957	1 Jan 1960	3	Assistant Commandant for Air, U.S. Marine Corps/Director of Aviation/Assistant Chief of Naval Operations for Marine Aviation, 1957.; Assistant Commandant of the Marine Corps, 1957–1960.	(1903–1968)
27	Robert E. Hogaboom		1 Dec 1957	30 Oct 1959	2	Chief of Staff, Headquarters Marine Corps, 1957–1959.	(1902–1993) Retired as general, 30 Oct 1959.
28	Joseph C. Burger		1 Nov 1959	1 Nov 1961	2	Commanding General, Fleet Marine Force, Atlantic, 1959–1961.	(1902–1982)
29	Edward W. Snedeker		1 Nov 1959	1 Jul 1963	4	Commandant, Marine Corps Schools, 1959–1963.	(1903–1995)
30	Thomas A. Wornham		1 Nov 1959	1 Apr 1961	1	Commanding General, Fleet Marine Force, Pacific, 1959–1961.	(1903–1984)
31	David M. Shoup		2 Nov 1959	1 Jan 1960	0	Chief of Staff, Headquarters Marine Corps, 1959–1960.	(1904–1983) Commandant of the Marine Corps, with rank of general, 1 Jan 1960–31 Dec 1963. Awarded Medal of Honor, 1943.

== Timeline ==
An officer held the active-duty grade of lieutenant general (Lt. Gen.) in the U.S. Marine Corps until his death, retirement, reversion to lower permanent grade upon vacating a position carrying the ex officio rank, or promotion to general (Gen.). An officer on the retired list could also be recalled to active duty in the grade of lieutenant general (Lt. Gen. (ret.)) or general (Gen. (ret.)).

By 1960, there were five ex officio lieutenant generals. Two commanded the Fleet Marine Forces in the Pacific (FMFPAC) and Atlantic (FMFLANT), and a third commanded the Marine Corps Schools (MCS). A fourth served as assistant commandant of the Marine Corps (ACMC) and the fifth was assigned to Headquarters Marine Corps (HQMC) as director of aviation or chief of staff.

== History ==
=== World War I ===
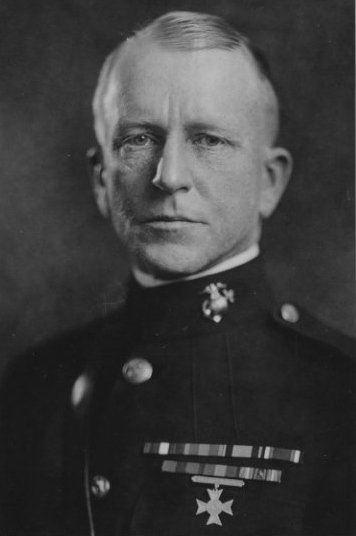
James C. Breckinridge

The rank of lieutenant general in the Marine Corps was first proposed in 1918, when the Senate Naval Affairs Committee tried to increase the rank of the major general commandant and his three senior staff officers for the duration of World War I. Instigated by the incumbent commandant, George Barnett, the proposal was blocked by Navy secretary Josephus Daniels and House Naval Affairs Committee member Thomas S. Butler, who was outraged that the headquarters staff would gain a lieutenant general commandant and three major generals at a time when no Marine major generals were deployed in the field. The incident contributed to Daniels' decision to remove Barnett midway through his second term as commandant.

A decade later, Butler himself tried to promote Barnett's successor as commandant, John A. Lejeune, to lieutenant general to match the three-star rank proposed for Army corps area commanders in 1928. The Navy had four admirals and three vice admirals, but the highest active-duty Army rank was only major general, so the War Department asked Congress to raise the ex officio ranks of the Army chief of staff and three overseas department commanders to general and nine corps area commanders to lieutenant general. At the President's behest, the House Military Affairs Committee approved only the four-star promotion for the chief of staff. Since the Army still had no lieutenant generals and Navy secretary Curtis D. Wilbur felt the commandant was not equivalent to a three-star fleet commander in the Navy, Lejeune's promotion died in committee.

In 1925, Congress authorized Marine Corps officers to retire with a tombstone promotion to the rank but not the retired pay of the next higher grade if they were specially commended for performance of duty in actual combat during World War I, but only if they retired because they were too old to be promoted further, a condition that excluded major generals, who already held the highest grade in the Marine Corps. Congress expanded eligibility in 1938 to cover officers with a qualifying combat citation from any time period who retired for any reason, allowing James C. Breckinridge to become the first three-star Marine when he retired with a tombstone promotion to lieutenant general in October 1941. Lejeune lobbied Congress to extend tombstone promotions to officers who had retired before 1938, and finally received his third star in April 1942.

=== World War II ===
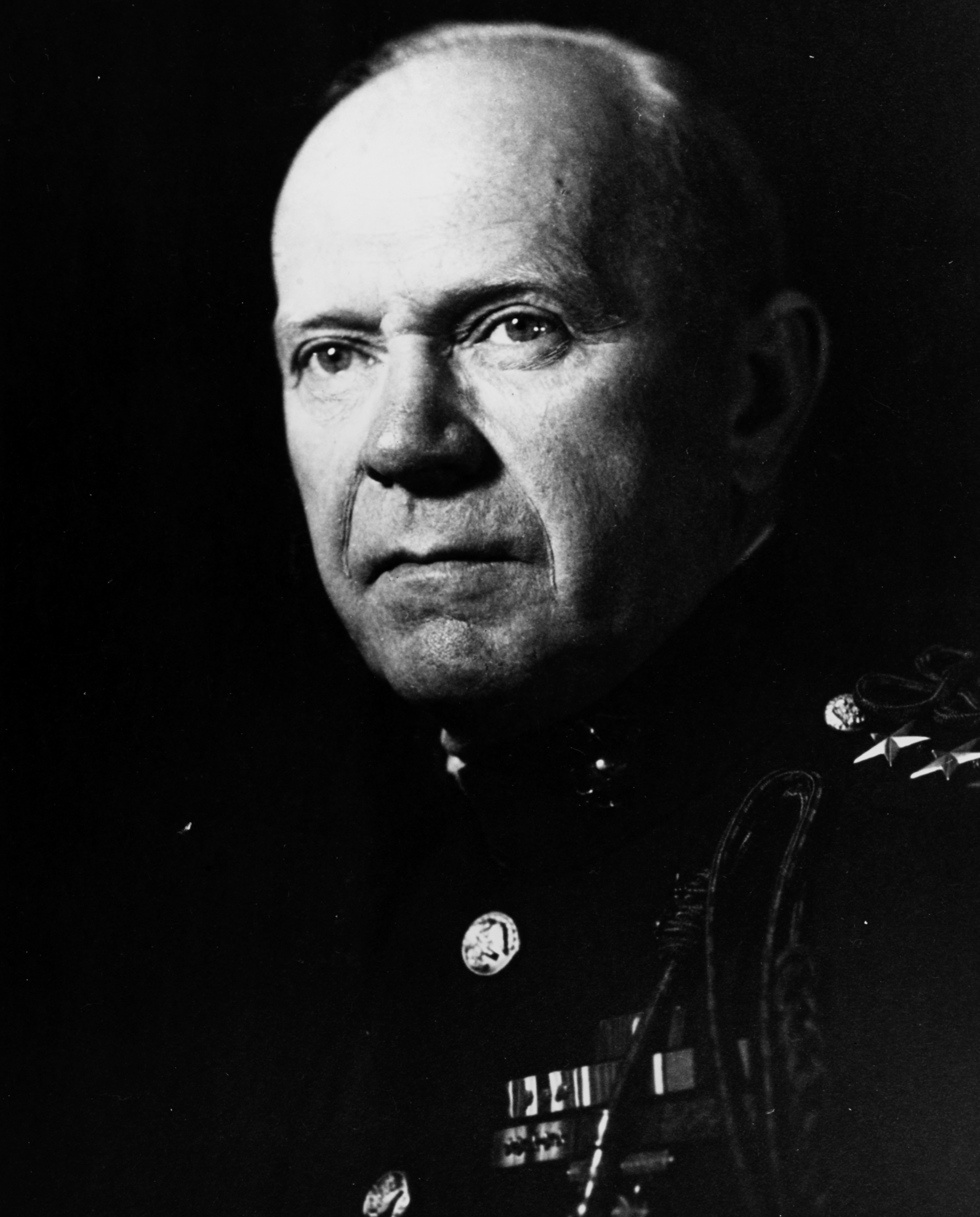
Thomas Holcomb

In January 1942, following the United States entry into World War II, Congress increased the commandant's rank to lieutenant general, making Thomas Holcomb the first three-star Marine to serve on active duty. Holcomb's superior, chief of naval operations Ernest J. King, opposed promoting more Marines to that rank, but King relented after Alexander A. Vandegrift, recently awarded the Medal of Honor for the Battle of Guadalcanal, was assigned to command the first Marine amphibious corps and slated to succeed Holcomb as commandant. Vandegrift was appointed temporary lieutenant general in July 1943, under a 1941 law that anticipated the wartime expansion of the Marine Corps by authorizing an unlimited number of temporary general officers for the duration of the national emergency.

When Vandegrift returned to the United States to become commandant in January 1944, King rejected Holcomb's bid to maintain a three-star Marine in the Pacific theater by promoting the other amphibious corps commander, Holland M. Smith, who had led the ground forces at the Battle of Tarawa. Smith received his third star only after the naval commanders at Tarawa, Raymond A. Spruance and Richmond K. Turner, were rewarded with promotions in March 1944.

Unlike Holcomb, whose three-star rank was an aspect of his office of commandant, Vandegrift and Smith held personal three-star grades that followed them regardless of assignment, as did every other temporary lieutenant general appointed before the Officer Personnel Act of 1947 made all three-star ranks ex officio. For example, upon relinquishing his final command in May 1946, Smith remained a lieutenant general for the three months until he actually retired, whereas a postwar lieutenant general would have reverted immediately to his permanent two-star grade. Early promotions to these wartime grades therefore rewarded past personal triumphs—Guadalcanal for Vandegrift and Tarawa for Smith—as much as future organizational efficiency.

By the end of the war, the commandant was a full general. One lieutenant general commanded Marines deployed overseas under Fleet Marine Force, Pacific, and a second lieutenant general commanded Marines being readied for deployment under Marine Training and Replacement Command. A third lieutenant general was appointed in January 1947 to command the new Fleet Marine Force, Atlantic.

=== Postwar ===
The Officer Personnel Act of 1947 authorized only two lieutenant generals for the Marine Corps after July 1, 1948, except during war or national emergency. All active-duty ranks above major general were temporary and ex officio, so upon vacating an office carrying three-star rank, an officer reverted to his permanent two-star grade unless he retired. The two lieutenant generals were assigned to command the operating forces in the Pacific and Atlantic.

The permanent peacetime limit of two lieutenant generals was imposed during the post-World War II drawdown, but remained in place even as the Marine Corps expanded during the Cold War. The state of emergency declared for the Korean War on December 16, 1950, allowed a third lieutenant general to serve as assistant commandant and chief of staff of the Marine Corps, and a fourth as commandant of Marine Corps Schools. A fifth lieutenant general was assigned to Headquarters Marine Corps as director of aviation in 1953, but its three-star designation shifted to the chief of staff when that job was separated from assistant commandant in 1957.

Congress finally declared in 1977 that up to 15 percent of all active-duty Marine Corps general officers could be lieutenant generals or generals even without an emergency, after the 1976 National Emergencies Act terminated all existing national emergencies, effective September 14, 1978, which would have eliminated five of the seven lieutenant generals then on active duty.

=== Tombstone promotions ===
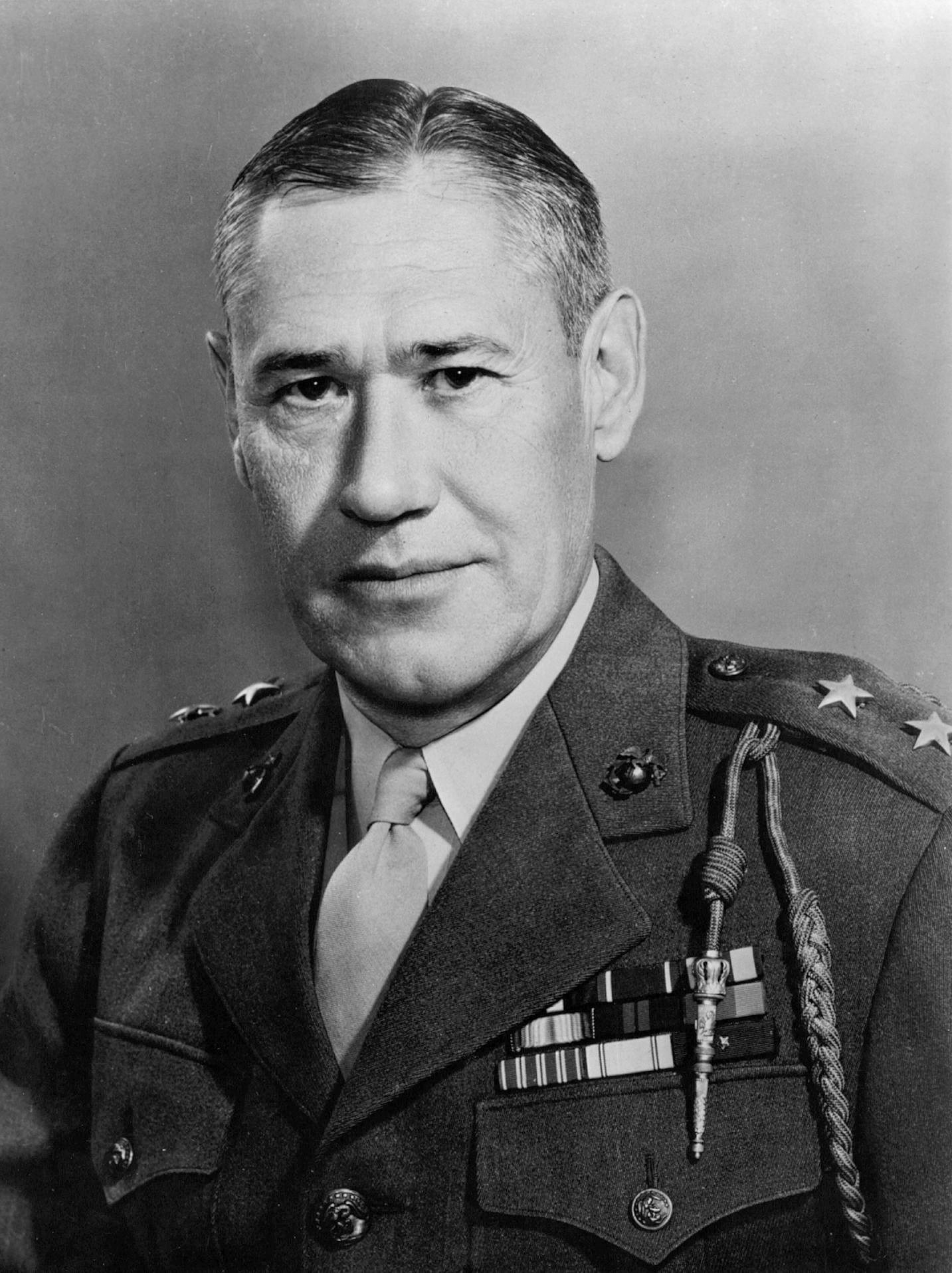
Keller E. Rockey

From 1938 to 1959, Marine officers who were specially commended for the performance of duty in actual combat before the end of World War II could retire with the rank but not the pay of the next higher grade. Such honorary increases in rank at retirement were called tombstone promotions, since their only tangible benefit was the right to carve the higher rank on one's tombstone. Tombstone promotions made James C. Breckinridge the first three-star Marine in October 1941, and Thomas Holcomb the first four-star Marine in January 1944.

A lieutenant general could only receive a tombstone promotion to four-star general if he still held a three-star job on the day he retired. When Oliver P. Smith was abruptly ordered to relinquish his three-star command on September 1, 1955, and revert to major general for the two months until his statutory retirement, he moved up his retirement date to September 1 and kept his tombstone promotion to general.

Of the 27 lieutenant generals appointed before Congress ended tombstone promotions on November 1, 1959, all but five were promoted to general, either by tombstone promotion, selection as commandant, or posthumous legislation, in the case of Roy S. Geiger, who died only a week before he was scheduled to retire with a tombstone promotion. The exceptions were Keller E. Rockey and Robert H. Pepper, who preferred to revert to major general rather than retire at the end of their three-star assignments; Thomas E. Watson, who relinquished command of Fleet Marine Force, Pacific for an assignment at Headquarters Marine Corps, but retired for ill health only three months later; Merwin H. Silverthorn, who was too young to retire for age when his three-star assignment ended and Congress had suspended early retirements; and Verne J. McCaul, who chose to sacrifice a fourth star to stay on active duty until the new commandant took office two months after tombstone promotions ended.

=== Commandant successions ===
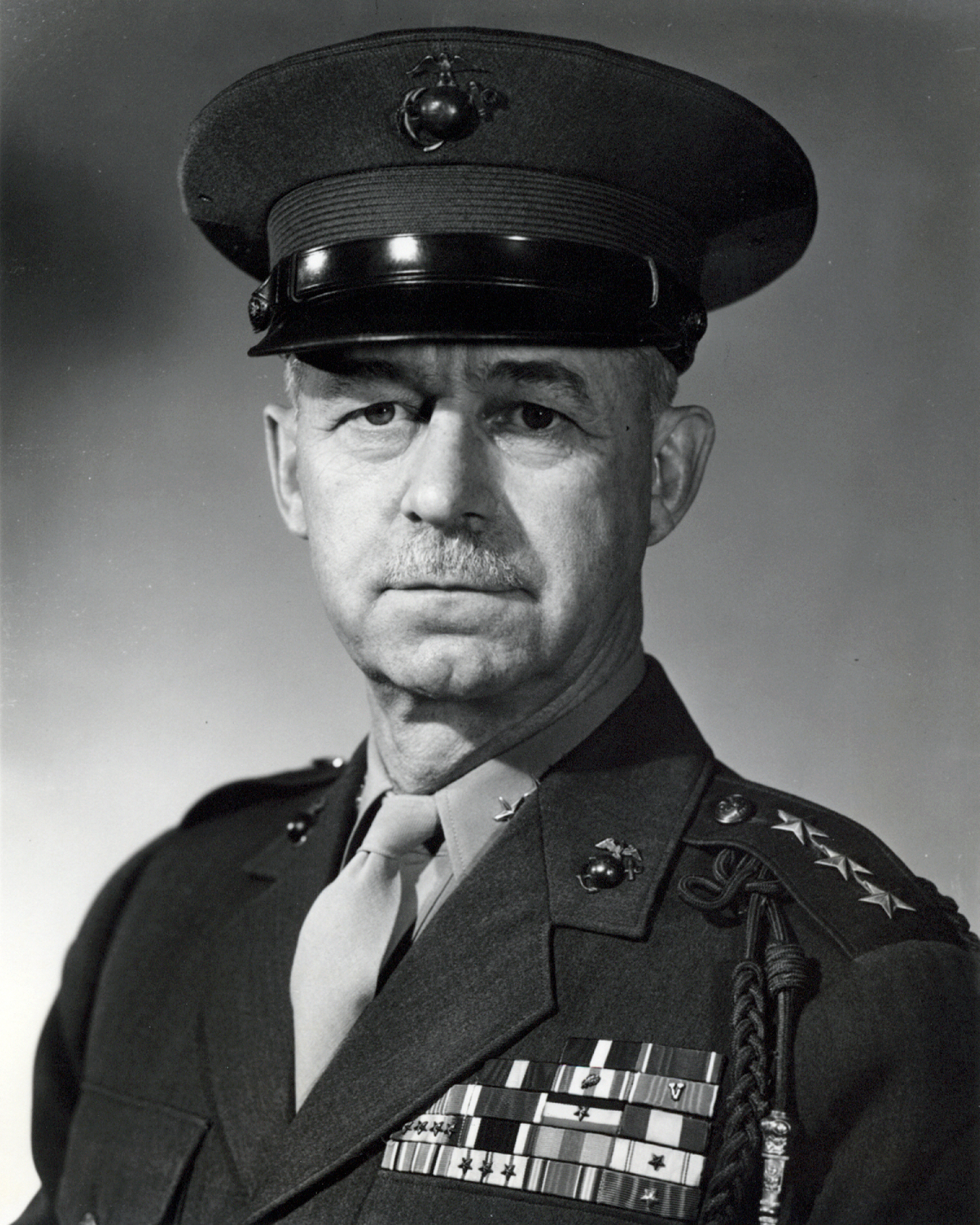
Merwin H. Silverthorn

Lieutenant general appointments were inextricably tied to the politics of commandant succession. Any lieutenant general was a viable candidate for commandant if he was young enough to complete a full four-year term before reaching the statutory retirement age of 62, as were prominent major generals.

A commandant tended to appoint lieutenant generals in two waves, one at the start of his term and one in the middle. The first wave filled three-star positions vacated by the newly appointed commandant and any rivals who chose to retire after being passed over. For example, Allen H. Turnage retired after a major general, Clifton B. Cates, was selected to be commandant in 1947, as did all five lieutenant generals after another major general, David M. Shoup, was selected in 1959. An incoming commandant might also choose not to retain his predecessor's lieutenant generals, to clear space for his own favorites. Of the five lieutenant generals who retired at Shoup's accession, at least two, Verne J. McCaul and Robert E. Hogaboom, only did so after he made clear they would not be continued at that rank. Upon succeeding Cates in 1952, Lemuel C. Shepherd Jr. promptly appointed Gerald C. Thomas to be his assistant commandant and chief of staff, sending Cates' appointee, Merwin H. Silverthorn, to a two-star job until retirement.

From the middle of his term, a commandant's choices for lieutenant general were meant to set up his preferred candidates to succeed him and eliminate others from consideration. When picking a commandant in 1947, President Harry S. Truman judged Cates and Shepherd to be equally qualified. Since Cates was senior, Truman appointed Cates first and promised to appoint Shepherd next. Cates duly appointed Shepherd to the next three-star vacancy, but when Oliver P. Smith returned to the United States in 1951 after famously commanding the 1st Marine Division at the Battle of Chosin Reservoir, Cates gave Smith another two-star command instead of the three-star promotion many expected, reducing the risk that Smith's popularity might derail Shepherd's succession. Smith finally received his third star two years later, after he was too old to be considered for commandant.

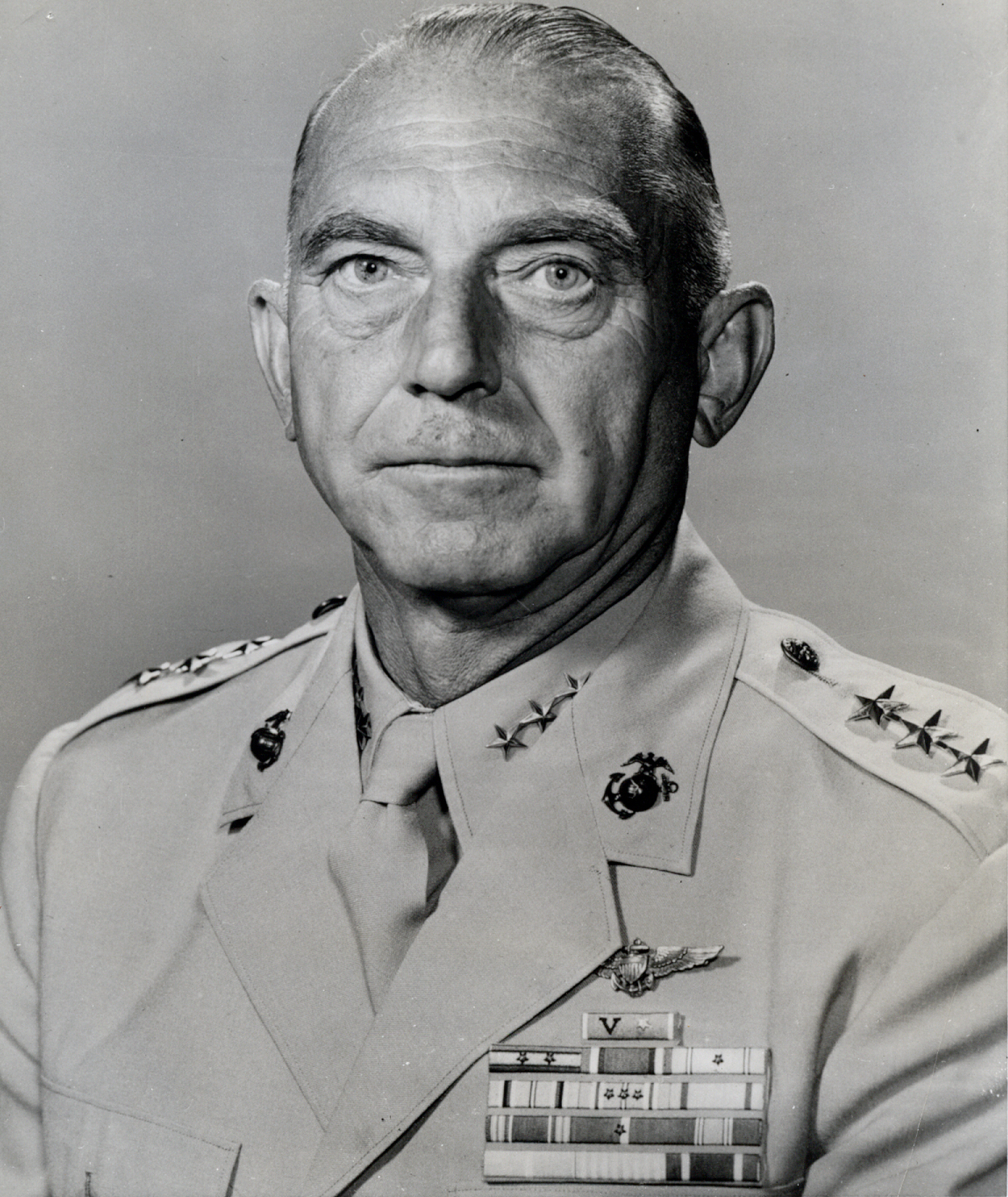
Verne J. McCaul

When Cates stepped down as commandant, he had to stay on active duty because a 1951 law froze voluntary officer retirements by withholding retired pay from any regular officer who retired for any reason other than age, disability, hardship, or the best interests of the service. (When Graves B. Erskine retired early to accept a civilian position in the Department of Defense in 1953, Congress had to pass special legislation to exempt him.) At Cates' request, Shepherd gave him the three-star job commanding Marine Corps Schools, repaying his support for Shepherd's succession. Congress repealed the law in 1954 and Cates retired two months later. Shepherd picked Thomas to succeed Cates, which simultaneously avoided creating another rival for the commandancy, since Thomas was too old to be considered, and freed Thomas' three-star job of assistant commandant and chief of staff for Shepherd's preferred candidate, Randolph M. Pate, who eventually did succeed Shepherd.

All such machinations failed when Pate's successor was selected in 1959. The best positioned three-star candidate, Merrill B. Twining, was viewed as too political by the secretary of defense, Thomas S. Gates Jr., who passed over all five lieutenant generals to recommend Shoup instead. Four of the five lieutenant generals collected tombstone promotions to general by retiring on November 1, 1959, the day the tombstone promotion law expired, but Verne J. McCaul chose to remain on duty until Shoup took office on January 1, 1960.

== Legislative history ==
The following list of Congressional legislation includes all acts of Congress pertaining to appointments to the grade of lieutenant general in the United States Marine Corps before 1960.

Each entry lists an act of Congress, its citation in the United States Statutes at Large, and a summary of the act's relevance.

Legislation	Citation	Summary
Act of March 4, 1925	43 Stat. 1279	Authorized officers who were specially commended for performance of duty in actual combat during World War I, and who retired because of ineligibility for promotion due to age, to be placed on the retired list with the rank of the next higher grade and three-fourths of the active-duty pay of the grade in which serving at the time of retirement.
Act of June 23, 1938	52 Stat. 951	Authorized officers who were specially commended for performance of duty in actual combat, to be placed on the retired list with the rank of the next higher grade and three-fourths of the active-duty pay of the grade in which serving at the time of retirement.
Act of July 24, 1941	55 Stat. 604	Authorized temporary appointments to higher ranks or grades during a national emergency, with appointments to general officer requiring the advice and consent of the Senate.; Authorized retirement in highest temporary rank held on active duty.
Act of January 20, 1942	56 Stat. 10	Retitled Major General Commandant of the Marine Corps as Commandant of the Marine Corps, with ex officio rank of lieutenant general (Thomas Holcomb).
Act of February 23, 1942	56 Stat. 120	Authorized officers who were specially commended for performance of duty in actual combat, and who retired before June 23, 1938, to be advanced on the retired list to the rank of the next higher grade and three-fourths of the active-duty pay of the grade in which serving at the time of retirement.
Act of March 21, 1945	59 Stat. 36	Authorized Commandant of the Marine Corps to be promoted to grade of general (Alexander A. Vandegrift).
Act of June 30, 1947 [Private Law 36]	61 Stat. 978	Authorized posthumous promotion of Roy S. Geiger to general.
Act of August 7, 1947 [Officer Personnel Act of 1947]	61 Stat. 874; 61 Stat. 876; 61 Stat. 880	Authorized officers who were specially commended for performance of duty in actual combat on or before December 31, 1946, to be placed on the retired list with (or advanced on the retired list to) the rank of the next higher grade and three-fourths of the active-duty pay of the grade in which serving at the time of retirement.; Authorized two lieutenant generals after July 1, 1948, or up to 10 percent of non-restricted duty general officers in time of war or national emergency.; Increased ex officio rank of Commandant of the Marine Corps to general.
Act of October 12, 1949 [Career Compensation Act of 1949]	63 Stat. 807; 63 Stat. 835	Established pay grade O-8 for general, lieutenant general, and major general.; Repealed authorization for officers who were specially commended for performance of duty in actual combat, to retire with three-fourths of the active-duty pay of the grade in which serving at the time of retirement.
Act of July 17, 1953 [Private Law 92]	67 Stat. A34	Authorized retired pay for Graves B. Erskine after his voluntary retirement.
Act of May 20, 1958	72 Stat. 124	Established pay grade O-9 for lieutenant general.
Act of August 11, 1959	73 Stat. 337	Repealed authorization for officers who were specially commended for performance of duty in actual combat, to retire with the rank of the next higher grade, effective November 1, 1959.

== See also ==
- Lieutenant general (United States)
- List of lieutenant generals in the United States Army before 1960
- List of lieutenant generals in the United States Air Force before 1960
- List of United States Navy vice admirals on active duty before 1960
- List of United States Marine Corps tombstone lieutenant generals
- List of United States Marine Corps lieutenant generals from 2000 to 2009
- List of United States Marine Corps lieutenant generals since 2010
- List of United States Marine Corps four-star generals
