= William L. Nyland =

United States Marine Corps general

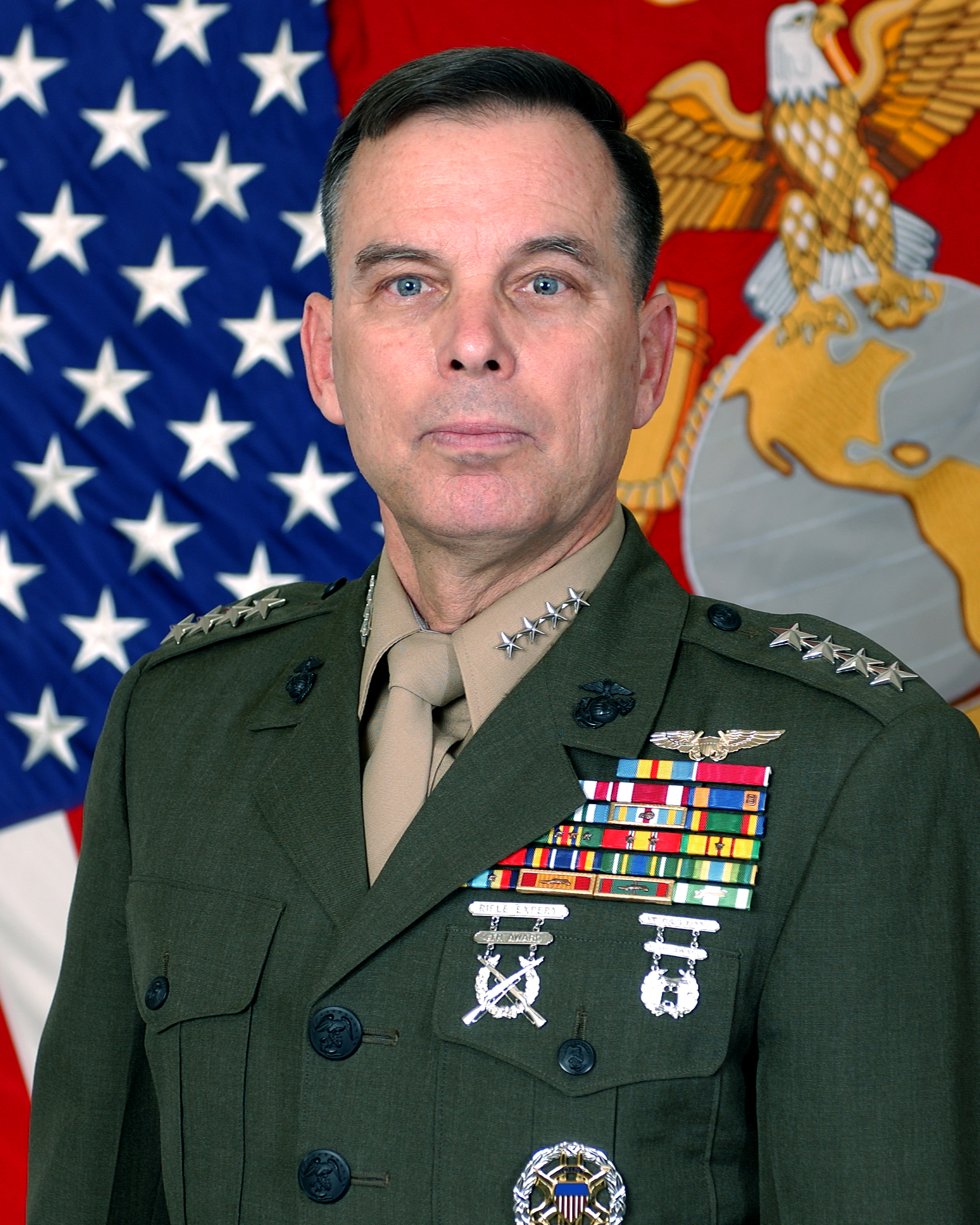
- General William L. Nyland, USMC
- Born: October 2, 1946 (age 80)
- Military career
- Allegiance: United States of America
- Branch: United States Marine Corps
- Service years: 1968–2005
- Rank: General
- Nickname: "Spider"
- Commands: Assistant Commandant of the Marine Corps; 2nd Marine Aircraft Wing; MATSG Pensacola; VMFA-232
- Conflicts: Vietnam War
- Awards: Defense Distinguished Service Medal; Navy Distinguished Service Medal; Legion of Merit
- Other work: Institute for Human and Machine Cognition (IHMC), Deputy Director for Defense R&D; Toys for Tots, Chairman

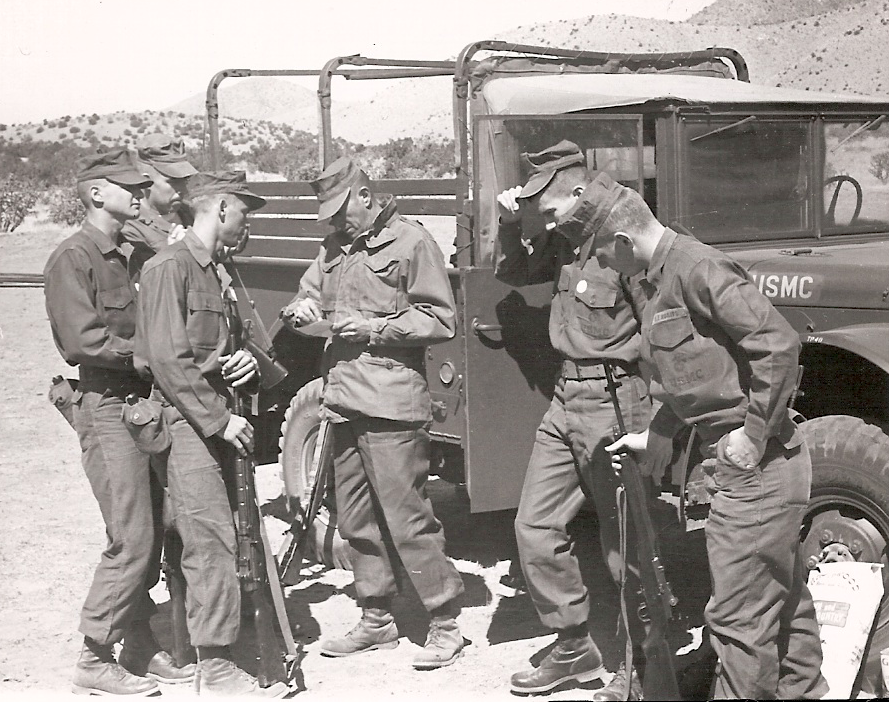
Midshipman Nyland (holding M14 rifle in the left foreground) during a 1967 field exercise at the University of New Mexico.

William L. "Spider" Nyland (born October 2, 1946), a veteran of the Vietnam War, is a retired United States Marine Corps four-star General who served as the Assistant Commandant of the Marine Corps from 2002 to 2005. He retired from the Marine Corps in November 2005 after over 37 years of distinguished service.

== Marine Corps career ==
Nyland was commissioned a second lieutenant in the Marine Corps under the Naval ROTC program upon graduation in 1968 from the University of New Mexico. In addition to attaining a Master of Science degree from the University of Southern California, his formal military education includes The Basic School (1968), Naval Aviation Flight Training (NFO) (1969), Amphibious Warfare School (1975), Navy Fighter Weapons School (TOPGUN) (1977), College of Naval Command and Staff, Naval War College (1981), and the Air War College (1988).

He was advanced to first lieutenant on September 5, 1969, captain on February 1, 1972, major on September 1, 1978, and lieutenant colonel on April 1, 1984.

After being assigned to Marine Fighter Attack Squadron 531 (VMFA-531), he was ordered to Vietnam, where he flew 122 combat missions with VMFA-314 and VMFA-115. His other tours included: Instructor RIO, Marine Fighter Attack Training Squadron 101 (VMFAT-101); Squadron Assistant Operations Officer and Operations Officer, VMFA-115; and Brigade FORSTAT and Electronic Warfare Officer, 1st Marine Brigade. He also served as Operations Officer and Director of Safety and Standardization, VMFA-212; Aviation Safety Officer and Congressional Liaison/Budget Officer, Headquarters, U.S. Marine Corps, Washington, D.C.; and Operations Officer, Marine Aircraft Group 24, 1st Marine Amphibious Brigade. He commanded VMFA-232, the Marine Corps' oldest and most decorated fighter squadron, from July 1985 to July 1987.

Lieutenant Colonel Nyland subsequently served as section chief for the Central Command Section, European Command/Central Command Branch, Joint Operations Division, Directorate of Operations (J-3), Joint Staff, Washington, D.C. He was promoted to colonel on February 1, 1990. In July 1990, Colonel Nyland assumed command of Marine Aviation Training Support Group Pensacola, Florida. Following his command of MATSG, he assumed duties as Chief of Staff, 2nd Marine Aircraft Wing (2MAW) on July 5, 1992, and assumed additional duties as Assistant Wing Commander on November 10, 1992. He was promoted to brigadier general on September 1, 1994 and was assigned as Assistant Wing Commander, 2MAW, serving in that billet until December 1, 1995.

Brigadier General Nyland served next on the Joint Staff, J-8, as the Deputy Director for Force Structure and Resources, completing that tour on June 30, 1997. He was advanced to major general on July 2, 1997, and assumed duties as the Deputy Commanding General, II Marine Expeditionary Force, Camp Lejeune, North Carolina. He then served as the Commanding General, 2nd Marine Aircraft Wing, from July 1998 to June 2000. He was advanced to lieutenant general on June 30, 2000 and assumed duties as the Deputy Commandant for Programs and Resources, Headquarters, U.S. Marine Corps. He next assumed duties as the Deputy Commandant for Aviation on August 3, 2001. He was advanced to general on September 4, 2002, and assumed his duties as the Assistant Commandant of the Marine Corps on September 10, 2002.

General Nyland served as the Assistant Commandant of the Marine Corps, Headquarters Marine Corps, Washington D.C., from September 2002 until September 7, 2005. He retired from active duty on November 1, 2005.

== Awards ==
His personal decorations include:

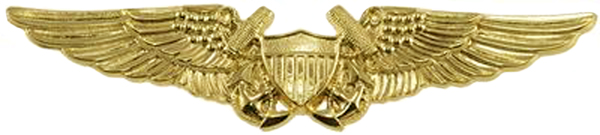

Naval Flight Officer insignia
1st Row	Defense Distinguished Service Medal	Navy Distinguished Service Medal	Legion of Merit	Defense Meritorious Service Medal
2nd Row	Meritorious Service Medal	Air Medal w/ Strike/Flight numeral "8"	Joint Service Commendation Medal	Joint Meritorious Unit Award w/ 1 oak leaf cluster
3rd Row	Navy Unit Commendation	Navy Meritorious Unit Commendation w/ 4 service stars	National Defense Service Medal w/ 2 service stars	Vietnam Service Medal w/ 1 service star
4th Row	Kosovo Campaign Medal w/ 1 service star	Global War on Terrorism Service Medal	Korea Defense Service Medal	Armed Forces Service Medal
5th Row	Navy Sea Service Deployment Ribbon w/ 6 service stars	Vietnam Gallantry Cross unit citation	Vietnam Civil Actions unit citation	Vietnam Campaign Medal
Badge	EXPERT RIFLE badge (4TH AWARD)		EXPERT PISTOL badge (several awards)	
Office of the Joint Chiefs of Staff Identification Badge

== In retirement ==
As of August 2006, Nyland serves as Deputy Director for Defense Research and Development for the Florida Institute for Human and Machine Cognition (IHMC). He is on the Board of Directors for FreeLinc.

Nyland served as Chairman of Toys for Tots He also served as Chairman of the Marine Corps Scholarship Foundation and He also served as The National Commander for the Marine Corps Aviation Association (January 2007-January 2010).

== See also ==
- List of United States Marine Corps four-star generals

== Notes ==
Military offices
Preceded by Michael J. Williams	Assistant Commandant of the Marine Corps; 2002-2005	Succeeded by Robert Magnus
