= List of United States Marine Corps four-star generals =

Flag of a Marine Corps four-star general

The rank of general (or full general, or four-star general) is the highest rank in the United States Marine Corps. It ranks above lieutenant general (three-star general).

There have been 78 four-star generals in the history of the U.S. Marine Corps. Of these, 59 achieved that rank while on active duty, and 17 were promoted upon retirement in recognition of combat citations (1942–1959). One was promoted posthumously. Generals entered the Marine Corps by several paths: 31 from Officer Candidates School (OCS), 28 from Naval Reserve Officer Training Corps (NROTC) at a civilian university, 9 from the United States Naval Academy (USNA), 7 from ROTC at a senior military college, and 3 from ROTC at civilian universities.

== List of generals ==
Entries in the following list of four-star generals are indexed by the numerical order in which each officer was promoted to that rank while on active duty, or by an asterisk (*) if the officer did not serve in that rank while on active duty. Each entry lists the general's name, date of rank, active-duty positions held while serving at four-star rank, number of years of active-duty service at four-star rank (Yrs), year commissioned and source of commission, number of years in commission when promoted to four-star rank (YC), and other biographical notes.

#	Name	Photo	Date of rank	Position	Yrs	Commission	YC	Notes
1	Alexander A. Vandegrift		21 Mar 1945	Commandant, U.S. Marine Corps (CMC), 1944–1947.	2	1909 (OCS)	36	(1887–1973) Awarded Medal of Honor, 1942.
*	Roy S. Geiger		23 Jan 1947	(posthumous)	0	1909 (OCS)	38	(1885–1947)
2	Clifton B. Cates		1 Jan 1948	Commandant, U.S. Marine Corps (CMC), 1948–1951.	4	1917 (OCS)	31	(1893–1970)
3	Lemuel C. Shepherd Jr.		1 Jan 1952	Commandant, U.S. Marine Corps (CMC), 1952–1955.; Chairman, Inter-American Defense Board, 1956–1959.	7	1917 (VMI)	35	(1896–1990)
4	Randolph M. Pate		1 Jan 1956	Commandant, U.S. Marine Corps (CMC), 1956–1959.	4	1921 (VMI)	35	(1898–1961)
5	David M. Shoup		1 Jan 1960	Commandant, U.S. Marine Corps (CMC), 1960–1963.	4	1926 (ROTC)	34	(1904–1983) Awarded Medal of Honor, 1943.
6	Wallace M. Greene Jr.		1 Jan 1964	Commandant, U.S. Marine Corps (CMC), 1964–1967.	4	1930 (USNA)	34	(1907–2003)
7	Leonard F. Chapman Jr.		1 Jan 1968	Commandant, U.S. Marine Corps (CMC), 1968–1971.	4	1935 (NROTC)	33	(1913–2000) U.S. Commissioner of Immigration and Naturalization, 1973–1977.
8	Lewis W. Walt		2 Jun 1969	Assistant Commandant, U.S. Marine Corps (ACMC), 1968–1971.	2	1936 (ROTC)	33	(1913–1989)
9	Raymond G. Davis		12 Mar 1971	Assistant Commandant, U.S. Marine Corps (ACMC), 1971–1972.	1	1938 (ROTC)	33	(1915–2003) Awarded Medal of Honor, 1950.
10	Keith B. McCutcheon		1 Jul 1971	Assistant Commandant, U.S. Marine Corps (ACMC), 1971.	0	1937 (ROTC)	34	(1915–1971)
11	Robert E. Cushman Jr.		1 Jan 1972	Commandant, U.S. Marine Corps (CMC), 1972–1975.	4	1935 (USNA)	37	(1914–1985) Deputy Director of Central Intelligence, 1969–1971.
12	Earl E. Anderson		31 Mar 1972	Assistant Commandant, U.S. Marine Corps (ACMC), 1972–1975.	3	1940 (NROTC)	32	(1919–2015)
13	Louis H. Wilson Jr.		1 Jul 1975	Commandant, U.S. Marine Corps (CMC), 1975–1979.	4	1941 (OCS)	34	(1920–2005) Awarded Medal of Honor, 1944.
14	Samuel Jaskilka		4 Mar 1976	Assistant Commandant, U.S. Marine Corps (ACMC), 1975–1978.	3	1942 (OCS)	34	(1919–2012)
15	Robert H. Barrow		1 Jul 1978	Assistant Commandant, U.S. Marine Corps (ACMC), 1978–1979.; Commandant, U.S. Marine Corps (CMC), 1979–1983.	5	1942 (OCS)	36	(1922–2008)
16	Kenneth McLennan		2 Jul 1979	Assistant Commandant/Chief of Staff, U.S. Marine Corps (ACMC/COFS), 1979–1981.	3	1945 (OCS)	34	(1925–2005)
17	Paul X. Kelley		1 Jul 1981	Assistant Commandant/Chief of Staff, U.S. Marine Corps (ACMC/COFS), 1981–1983.; Commandant, U.S. Marine Corps (CMC), 1983–1987.	6	1950 (NROTC)	31	(1928–2019) Chairman, American Battle Monuments Commission, 1991–1994, 2001–2005.
18	John K. Davis		1 Jul 1983	Assistant Commandant, U.S. Marine Corps (ACMC), 1983–1986.	3	1950 (NROTC)	33	(1927–2019)
19	George B. Crist		22 Nov 1985	Commander in Chief, U.S. Central Command (USCINCCENT), 1985–1988.	3	1952 (NROTC)	33	(1931–2024)
20	Thomas R. Morgan		1 Jun 1986	Assistant Commandant, U.S. Marine Corps (ACMC), 1986–1988.	2	1952 (NROTC)	34	(1930–2024)
21	Alfred M. Gray Jr.		1 Jul 1987	Commandant, U.S. Marine Corps (CMC), 1987–1991.	4	1952 (OCS)	35	(1928–2024)
22	Joseph J. Went		1 Jul 1988	Assistant Commandant/Chief of Staff, U.S. Marine Corps (ACMC/COFS), 1988–1990.	2	1952 (NROTC)	36	(1930– )
23	John R. Dailey		1 Aug 1990	Assistant Commandant/Chief of Staff, U.S. Marine Corps (ACMC/COFS), 1990–1992.	3	1956 (NROTC)	34	(1934– ) Associate Deputy Administrator, National Aeronautics and Space Administration, 1992–1999; Director, National Air and Space Museum, 2000–2018.
24	Carl E. Mundy Jr.		1 Jul 1991	Commandant, U.S. Marine Corps (CMC), 1991–1995.	4	1957 (NROTC)	34	(1935–2014) President, United Service Organizations, 1996–2000.
25	Joseph P. Hoar		1 Sep 1991	Commander in Chief, U.S. Central Command (USCINCCENT), 1991–1994.	3	1957 (NROTC)	34	(1934–2022)
26	Walter E. Boomer		1 Sep 1992	Assistant Commandant, U.S. Marine Corps (ACMC), 1992–1994.	2	1960 (NROTC)	32	(1938– )
27	Richard D. Hearney		15 Jul 1994	Assistant Commandant, U.S. Marine Corps (ACMC), 1994–1996.	2	1962 (OCS)	32	(1939– )
28	John J. Sheehan		31 Oct 1994	Supreme Allied Commander Atlantic/Commander in Chief, U.S. Atlantic Command (SACLANT/CINCLANT), 1994–1997.	3	1962 (NROTC)	32	(1940– )
29	Charles C. Krulak		29 Jun 1995	Commandant, U.S. Marine Corps (CMC), 1995–1999.	4	1964 (USNA)	31	(1942– ) President, Birmingham–Southern College, 2011–2015. Son of Marine Corps lieutenant general Victor H. Krulak.
30	Richard I. Neal		19 Sep 1996	Assistant Commandant, U.S. Marine Corps (ACMC), 1996–1998.	2	1965 (NROTC)	31	(1942–2022)
31	Anthony C. Zinni		8 Aug 1997	Commander in Chief, U.S. Central Command (USCINCCENT), 1997–2000.	3	1965 (NROTC)	32	(1943– ) U.S. Special Envoy to the Middle East, 2002–2003; U.S. Special Envoy to Qatar, 2017–2019.
32	Charles E. Wilhelm		25 Sep 1997	Commander in Chief, U.S. Southern Command (USCINCSO), 1997–2000.	3	1964 (NROTC)	33	(1941– )
33	Terrence R. Dake		5 Sep 1998	Assistant Commandant, U.S. Marine Corps (ACMC), 1998–2000.	2	1966 (OCS)	32	(1944– )
34	James L. Jones		30 Jun 1999	Commandant, U.S. Marine Corps (CMC), 1999–2003.; Supreme Allied Commander, Europe/Commander, U.S. European Command (SACEUR/CDRUSEUCOM), 2003–2006.	7	1967 (NROTC)	32	(1943– ) National Security Advisor, 2009–2010.
35	Peter Pace		8 Sep 2000	Commander in Chief, U.S. Southern Command (USCINCSO), 2000–2001.; Vice Chairman, Joint Chiefs of Staff (VJCS), 2001–2005.; Chairman, Joint Chiefs of Staff (CJCS), 2005–2007.	7	1967 (USNA)	33	(1945– ) Awarded Presidential Medal of Freedom, 2008.
36	Carlton W. Fulford Jr.		1 Oct 2000	Deputy Commander in Chief, U.S. European Command (DCINCEUR), 2000–2002.; Deputy Commander, U.S. European Command (DCDRUSEUCOM), 2002.	2	1966 (USNA)	34	(1944– )
37	Michael J. Williams		1 Nov 2000	Assistant Commandant, U.S. Marine Corps (ACMC), 2000–2002.	2	1967 (USNA)	33	(1943–2025)
38	William L. Nyland		4 Sep 2002	Assistant Commandant, U.S. Marine Corps (ACMC), 2002–2005.	3	1968 (NROTC)	34	(1946– )
39	Michael W. Hagee		14 Jan 2003	Commandant, U.S. Marine Corps (CMC), 2003–2006.	3	1968 (USNA)	35	(1944– )
40	James E. Cartwright		1 Sep 2004	Commander, U.S. Strategic Command (CDRUSSTRATCOM), 2004–2007.; Vice Chairman, Joint Chiefs of Staff (VJCS), 2007–2011.	7	1971 (NROTC)	33	(1949– )
41	Robert Magnus		1 Nov 2005	Assistant Commandant, U.S. Marine Corps (ACMC), 2005–2008.	3	1969 (NROTC)	36	(1947– )
42	James T. Conway		13 Nov 2006	Commandant, U.S. Marine Corps (CMC), 2006–2010.	4	1970 (OCS)	36	(1947– )
43	James N. Mattis		9 Nov 2007	Supreme Allied Commander Transformation/Commander, U.S. Joint Forces Command (SACT/CDRUSJFCOM), 2007–2009.; Commander, U.S. Joint Forces Command (CDRUSJFCOM), 2009–2010.; Commander, U.S. Central Command (CDRUSCENTCOM), 2010–2013.	6	1972 (NROTC)	35	(1950– ) U.S. Secretary of Defense, 2017–2019.
44	James F. Amos		2 Jul 2008	Assistant Commandant, U.S. Marine Corps (ACMC), 2008–2010.; Commandant. U.S. Marine Corps (CMC), 2010–2014.	6	1970 (NROTC)	38	(1946– ) First naval aviator to become commandant.
45	Joseph F. Dunford Jr.		23 Oct 2010	Assistant Commandant, U.S. Marine Corps (ACMC), 2010–2013.; Commander, International Security Assistance Force/Commander, U.S. Forces - Afghanistan (CDRISAF/CDRUSFOR-A), 2013–2014.; Commandant, U.S. Marine Corps (CMC), 2014–2015.; Chairman, Joint Chiefs of Staff (CJCS), 2015–2019.	9	1977 (OCS)	33	(1955– )
46	John R. Allen		18 Jul 2011	Commander, International Security Assistance Force/Commander, U.S. Forces - Afghanistan (CDRISAF/CDRUSFOR-A), 2011–2013.	2	1976 (USNA)	35	(1953– ) Special Presidential Envoy for the Global Coalition to Counter the Islamic State of Iraq and the Levant, 2014–2015; President, Brookings Institution, 2017–2022.
47	John F. Kelly		19 Nov 2012	Commander, U.S. Southern Command (CDRUSSOUTHCOM), 2012–2016.	3	1976 (OCS)	36	(1950– ) U.S. Secretary of Homeland Security, 2017; White House Chief of Staff, 2017–2019.
48	John M. Paxton Jr.		15 Dec 2012	Assistant Commandant, U.S. Marine Corps (ACMC), 2012–2016.	4	1974 (OCS)	38	(1951– )
49	Robert B. Neller		24 Sep 2015	Commandant, U.S. Marine Corps (CMC), 2015–2019.	4	1975 (OCS)	40	(1953– )
50	Thomas D. Waldhauser		18 Jul 2016	Commander, U.S. Africa Command (CDRUSAFRICOM), 2016–2019.	3	1976 (OCS)	40	(1953– )
51	Glenn M. Walters		2 Aug 2016	Assistant Commandant, U.S. Marine Corps (ACMC), 2016–2018.	2	1979 (Citadel)	37	(1957– ) President, The Citadel, 2018–present.
52	Gary L. Thomas		4 Oct 2018	Assistant Commandant, U.S. Marine Corps (ACMC), 2018–2021.	3	1984 (NROTC)	34	(1962– )
53	Kenneth F. McKenzie Jr.		28 Mar 2019	Commander, U.S. Central Command (CDRUSCENTCOM), 2019–2022.	3	1979 (Citadel)	40	(1957– )
54	David H. Berger		11 Jul 2019	Commandant, U.S. Marine Corps (CMC), 2019–2023.	4	1981 (NROTC)	38	(1959– )
55	Eric M. Smith		8 Oct 2021	Assistant Commandant, U.S. Marine Corps (ACMC), 2021–2023.; Commandant, U.S. Marine Corps (CMC), 2023–present.	5	1987 (Texas A&M)	34	(c. 1965– )
56	Michael E. Langley		6 Aug 2022	Commander, U.S. Africa Command (CDRUSAFRICOM), 2022–2025.	3	1985 (OCS)	37	(c. 1963– ) First African-American to achieve the rank of general in the Marine Corps.
57	Christopher J. Mahoney		2 Nov 2023	Assistant Commandant, U.S. Marine Corps (ACMC), 2023–2025.; Vice Chairman, Joint Chiefs of Staff (VJCS), 2025-present.	3	1987 (NROTC)	38	
58	Bradford J. Gering		2 Oct 2025	Assistant Commandant, U.S. Marine Corps (ACMC), 2025–present.	1	1989 (NROTC)	36	
59	Francis L. Donovan		5 Feb 2026	Commander, U.S. Southern Command (CDRUSSOUTHCOM), 2026–present.	0	1988 (NROTC)	38	

== Tombstone generals ==
The Act of Congress of March 4, 1925, allowed officers in the Navy, Marine Corps, and Coast Guard to be promoted one grade upon retirement if they had been specially commended for performance of duty in actual combat. Combat citation promotions were colloquially known as "tombstone promotions" because they conferred all the perks and prestige of the higher rank including the loftier title on their tombstones but no additional retirement pay. The Act of Congress of February 23, 1942, enabled tombstone promotions to three- and four-star grades. Tombstone promotions were subsequently restricted to citations issued before January 1, 1947, and finally eliminated altogether effective November 1, 1959. The practice was terminated in an effort to encourage senior officer retirements prior to the effective date of the change to relieve an overstrength in the senior ranks.

Any general who actually served in a grade while on active duty receives precedence on the retirement list over any tombstone general holding the same retired grade. Tombstone generals rank among each other according to the dates of their highest active duty grade.

	Name	Photo	Date of rank (LGEN)	Date retired	Commission	Notes
1	Thomas Holcomb		20 Jan 1942	Jan 1944	1900 (OCS)	(1879–1965); Commandant of the Marine Corps, 1936-1943; U.S. Minister to South Africa, 1944–1948
2	Holland M. Smith		28 Feb 1944	May 1946	1905 (OCS)	(1882–1967)
3	Harry Schmidt		1 Mar 1946	Jul 1948	1909 (OCS)	(1886–1968)
4	Allen H. Turnage		4 Oct 1946	Jan 1948	1913 (OCS)	(1891–1971)
5	LeRoy P. Hunt		1 Jul 1949	Jul 1951	1917 (OCS)	(1892–1968)
6	Franklin A. Hart		22 Feb 1951	Aug 1952	1917 (OCS)	(1894–1967)
7	Graves B. Erskine		2 Jul 1951	Jul 1953	1917 (OCS)	(1897–1973) Assistant to the Secretary of Defense for Special Operations, 1953–1961.
8	Gerald C. Thomas		8 Mar 1952	Jan 1956	1917 (OCS)	(1894–1984)
9	Oliver P. Smith		23 Jul 1953	Sep 1955	1917 (OCS)	(1893–1977)
10	William O. Brice		28 Aug 1953	1956	1921 (Citadel)	(1898–1972)
11	Christian F. Schilt		1 Aug 1955	Apr 1957	1919 (OCS)	(1895–1987) Awarded Medal of Honor, 1928.
12	Alfred H. Noble		1 Aug 1955	Nov 1956	1917 (OCS)	(1894–1983)
13	Vernon E. Megee		1 Jan 1956	Nov 1959	1922 (OCS)	(1900–1992)
14	Edwin A. Pollock		1 Jan 1956	Nov 1959	1921 (Citadel)	(1899–1982)
15	Merrill B. Twining		12 Sep 1956	Oct 1959	1923 (USNA)	(1902–1996) Brother of Air Force four-star general Nathan F. Twining.
16	Ray A. Robinson		1 Nov 1956	Nov 1957	1917 (OCS)	(1896–1976)
17	Robert E. Hogaboom		1 Dec 1957	Oct 1959	1925 (USNA)	(1902–1993)

== History ==
=== 1945–present ===
By the Act of March 21, 1945, Congress permitted the President to appoint the Commandant of the Marine Corps to the grade of general. Alexander Vandegrift, then Commandant, was promoted from lieutenant general to general on April 4, 1945, to rank from March 21 of that year. He thus became the first Marine to serve in the grade of general. The Office of the Commandant was permanently fixed at the grade of four-star general under authority of the Act of August 7, 1947. All Commandants since that date have been entitled by law to serve in the grade of general and, in accordance with the provisions of 10 U.S.C. § 5201, to retire in that grade.

In April 1969, the Senate passed and sent a bill to the White House that makes the Assistant Commandant of the Marine Corps a four-star general when the active duty strength of the Marine Corps exceeds 200,000. On May 5, 1969, President Richard Nixon signed the bill, and Lieutenant General Lewis William Walt was promoted to that rank on June 2, 1969, thus becoming the first Assistant Commandant of the Marine Corps to attain four-star rank. Legislation allowing the Assistant Commandant to wear the four-star insignia regardless of the strength of the Marine Corps was approved by President Gerald Ford on March 4, 1976.

On November 22, 1985, General George B. Crist was promoted to four-star rank and on November 27, he assumed the position of Commander in Chief of U.S. Central Command at MacDill Air Force Base, Florida. His appointment marked the first time a Marine headed a unified command and the first time the Corps had three four-star generals on active duty at the same time. Since 1985, a number of Marines have served in joint positions holding four-star rank, and it is no longer uncommon for the Corps to have four or five four-star generals on active duty at the same time.

In 2005, General Peter Pace became the first Marine to be appointed as Chairman of the Joint Chiefs of Staff, the chief military advisor to the President of the United States and most senior appointment in the United States armed forces. Previously, in 2001, General Pace was the first Marine officer to be appointed as Vice Chairman of the Joint Chiefs of Staff (VJCS).

The standard tour length for the commandant (CMC) is four years; two years for the assistant commandant (ACMC); for a combatant commander, three years; and a total of four years served in consecutive two-year terms for the chairman and vice chairman of the Joint Chiefs of Staff (CJCS/VJCS).

== Legislation ==
The following list of Congressional legislation includes major acts of Congress pertaining to appointments to the grade of general in the United States Marine Corps.

Legislation	Citation	Summary
Act of March 21, 1945	59 Stat. 36	Authorized one grade of general, appointed from officers serving now or hereafter as commandant of the Marine Corps, until six months after the end of World War II (Alexander A. Vandegrift) [made permanent in 1946 (60 Stat. 59)].
Act of August 7, 1947 [Officer Personnel Act of 1947]	61 Stat. 874; 61 Stat. 880	Increased rank of commandant to general.; Authorized all Marine Corps officers to retire with the rank but not the pay of the next higher grade if specially commended for performance of duty in actual combat on or before December 31, 1946 [repealed in 1959 (73 Stat. 337)].
Act of May 2, 1969	83 Stat. 8	Authorized grade of general for assistant commandant of the Marine Corps if total active duty strength of Marine Corps exceeds 200,000 at time of appointment [strength requirement repealed in 1976 (90 Stat. 202)].
Act of December 12, 1980 [Defense Officer Personnel Management Act]	94 Stat. 2844; 94 Stat. 2849; 94 Stat. 2876	Authorized president to designate positions of importance and responsibility to carry the grade of general, to be assigned from officers on active duty in any grade above colonel, subject to Senate confirmation, who revert to their permanent grade at the end of their assignment unless it was terminated by; 1. assignment to another position designated to carry the same grade, 2. up to 180 days of hospitalization, or; 3. up to 90 days prior to retirement [reduced to 60 days in 1991 (105 Stat. 1354)].; Capped, except during war or national emergency, Marine Corps officers in grades above major general at 15 percent of all general officers on active duty.; Authorized three- and four-star officers to retire in the highest grade held on active duty, at the discretion of the president and subject to confirmation by the Senate, with no time-in-grade requirement [changed in 1996 to certification by secretary of defense and three-year time-in-grade requirement (110 Stat. 292)].
Act of October 28, 2009	123 Stat. 2273; 123 Stat. 2276	Capped Marine Corps officers in the grade of general at 2, exempting up to 20 generals assigned to joint duty [joint-duty cap repealed in 2016, effective December 31, 2022 (130 Stat. 2100), and lowered in 2021 to 19 (134 Stat. 3563)].

== See also ==
- General (United States)
- List of active duty United States four-star officers
- List of United States Army four-star generals
- List of United States Navy four-star admirals
- List of United States Air Force four-star generals
- List of United States Space Force four-star generals
- List of United States Coast Guard four-star admirals
- List of United States Public Health Service Commissioned Corps four-star admirals
- List of United States military leaders by rank
- List of United States Marine Corps lieutenant generals on active duty before 1960
- List of United States Marine Corps lieutenant generals since 2010

== Bibliography ==
- United States Marine Corps History Division, Who's Who in Marine Corps History, archived from the original on 2007-02-19
  - History Division, Four-Star Generals of the Marine Corps
  - History Division, Commandants of the U.S. Marine Corps, archived from the original on 2011-12-19
  - History Division, Marine Corps Assistant Commandants, archived from the original on 2011-05-16
- United States Marine Corps Manpower & Reserve Affairs, Biographies: General Officers & Senior Executives, archived from the original on 2013-05-12
- United States Marine Corps Officer Candidates School, History of Officer Candidates School, archived from the original on 2007-02-05
- U.S. Bureau of Naval Personnel (1950–1959), Register of Commissioned and Warrant Officers of the United States Navy and Marine Corps, Washington D.C.: Department of the Navy
- "Generals' Exodus", TIME Magazine, September 7, 1959, archived from the original on October 28, 2007
