= Robert Magnus =

United States Marine Corps general

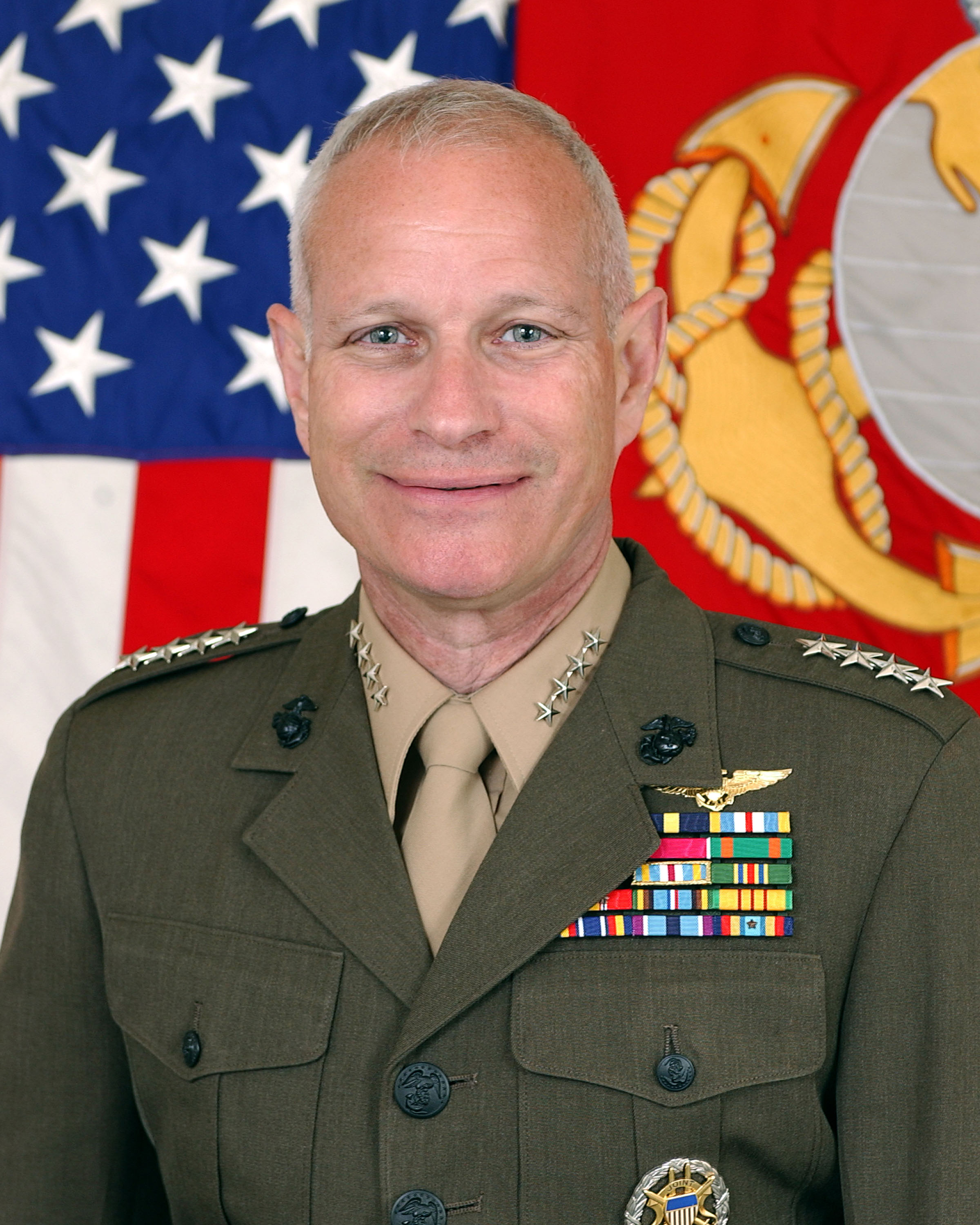
- 30th Assistant Commandant of the Marine Corps
- Born: April 28, 1947 (age 79); Brooklyn, New York, U.S.
- Military career
- Allegiance: United States of America
- Branch: United States Marine Corps
- Service years: 1969–1974; 1976–2008
- Rank: General
- Commands: Assistant Commandant of the Marine Corps; MCAS Miramar; Marine Corps Air Bases Western Area; HMM-365
- Awards: Navy Distinguished Service Medal (2); Defense Superior Service Medal; Legion of Merit; Navy Achievement Medal

Robert Magnus (born April 28, 1947) is a retired United States Marine Corps four-star general who served as the 30th Assistant Commandant of the Marine Corps from September 8, 2005, to July 2, 2008. He retired from active duty on July 17, 2008, after 38 years of total service.

== Biography ==
Magnus was born on April 28, 1947, in Brooklyn, New York, the youngest child of a bookkeeper and a seamstress. His family moved from Brooklyn's Flatbush neighborhood to the working class community of Levittown, Long Island, "a mile and a half from a potato farm". Magnus was sent to a Conservative Hebrew school three days a week and celebrated his bar mitzvah at the Hicksville Jewish Center on Long Island.

He majored in modern European and Russian history at the University of Virginia, graduating in 1969 with a Bachelor of Arts degree and a commission as a second lieutenant in the Marine Corps. He earned a master's degree in business administration from Strayer College in 1993. His formal military education includes Naval Aviator Training, U.S. Marine Corps Command and Staff College, and the National War College.

== Marine career ==
Magnus completed The Basic School at Quantico, Virginia, in 1969 and then reported to the Naval Air Training Command, where he was designated a Naval Aviator.

In October 1974, Magnus left the Marine Corps for 15 months to work on Wall Street. According to Magnus, "I realized three things: I really liked flying, I really liked leading people – especially Marines, and that Wall Street wasn't for me." When he returned to the Marines, Magnus became a weapons and tactics instructor for CH-46 helicopter aviators.

Magnus' operational assignments include: Intelligence Officer, HMM-264; Operations Officer, H&MS-15 SAR Detachment, Task Force Delta, Nam Phong, Thailand; Training Officer, SOES, MCAS Quantico; Aviation Safety Officer, Marine Aircraft Group 26 and HMM-263; Weapons and Tactics Instructor, Marine Aircraft Group 26 and HMM-261; Operations Officer, Marine Aircraft Group 29; Commanding Officer, HMM-365; Commander, Marine Corps Air Bases Western Area; Commanding General, MCAS Miramar; and Deputy Commander, Marine Forces Pacific (1999 – July 2000).

Magnus' staff assignments include Aviation Assault Medium Lift Requirements Officer; Chief, Logistics Readiness Center, Joint Staff; Executive Assistant to the Director of the Joint Staff; Head, Aviation Plans and Programs Branch; Assistant Deputy Chief of Staff for Aviation; Assistant Deputy Commandant for Plans, Policies, and Operations (July 2000 – August 2001); and Deputy Commandant for Programs and Resources (August 2001 – September 2005).

He was advanced to the rank of General on November 1, 2005, and began his assignment as the 30th Assistant Commandant of the Marine Corps on November 8, 2005. On July 2, 2008, he was succeed as Assistant Commandant by General James F. Amos. Magnus retired from active service in a ceremony on July 17, 2008, after 38 years of total service. Magnus received the Navy Distinguished Service Medal for his years of superior service to the U.S. military. He officially retired on September 1, 2008; at the time of his retirement, he was the last active officer of the Corps who had served during the Vietnam War.

== Awards and decorations ==
His personal decorations include:

Naval Aviator Badge
Navy Distinguished Service Medal with one gold award star	Defense Superior Service Medal	Legion of Merit	Navy and Marine Corps Achievement Medal
Joint Meritorious Unit Award	Navy Meritorious Unit Commendation	National Defense Service Medal w/ 2 service stars	Armed Forces Expeditionary Medal
Vietnam Service Medal	Global War on Terrorism Service Medal	Humanitarian Service Medal	Navy Sea Service Deployment Ribbon w/ 1 service star
Office of the Joint Chiefs of Staff Identification Badge

Magnus holds the Sharpshooter Rifle badge and several awards of the Expert Pistol badge.

== See also ==
- Gray Eagle Award
- List of United States Marine Corps four-star generals

Military offices
Preceded by William L. Nyland	Assistant Commandant of the Marine Corps; 2005-2008	Succeeded by James F. Amos
