= William O. Brice =

United States Marine Corps general

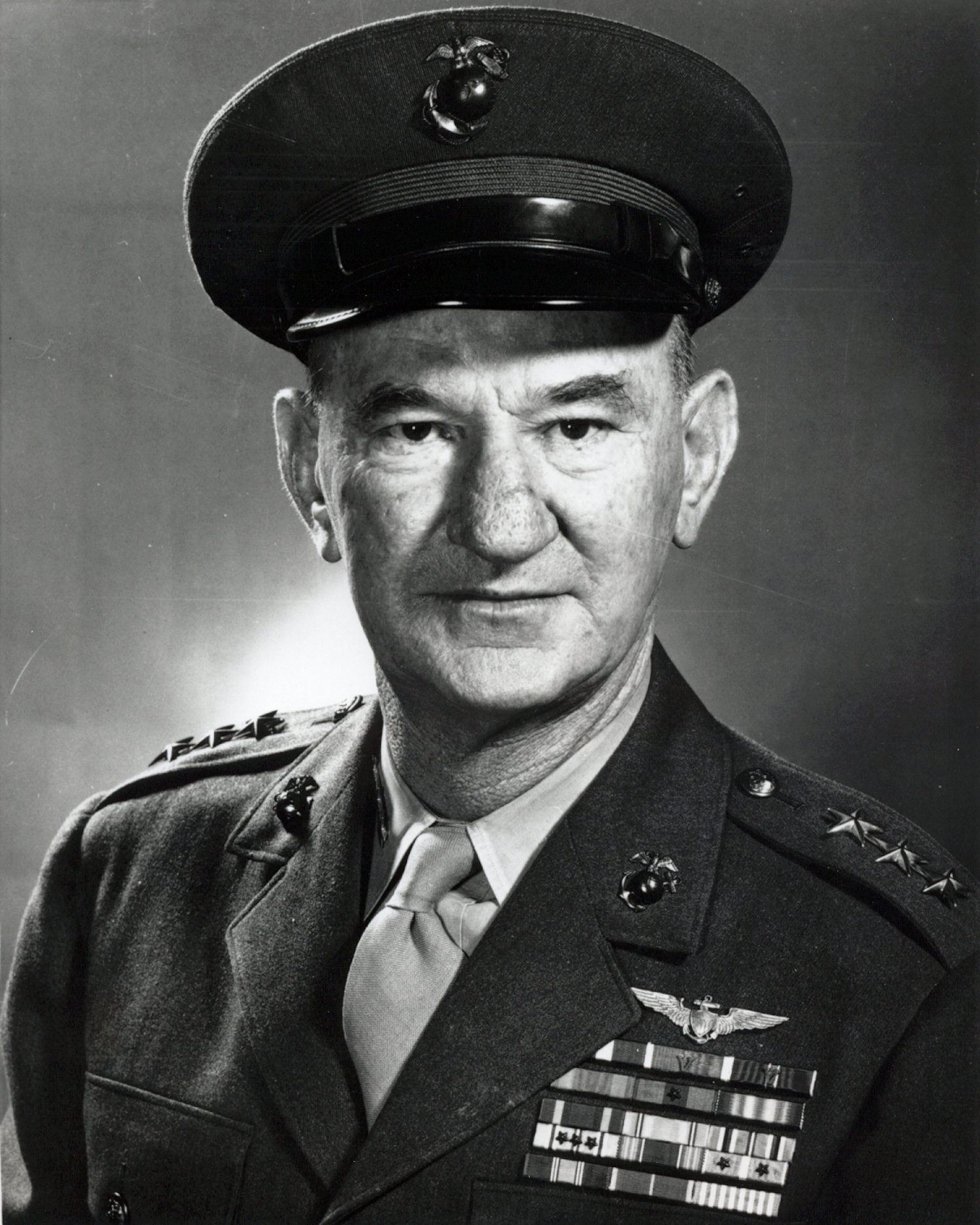
- William O. Brice
- Born: December 10, 1898; Columbia, South Carolina, U.S.
- Died: January 30, 1972 (aged 73); Fort Jackson, South Carolina, U.S.
- Burial place: Sion Presbyterian Cemetery; Winnsboro, South Carolina
- Military career
- Allegiance: United States
- Branch: United States Marine Corps
- Service years: 1917–1956
- Rank: General
- Commands: Marine Aircraft Group 14; Director of Aviation; Fleet Marine Force, Pacific
- Conflicts: World War I World War II; Korean War
- Awards: Navy Distinguished Service Medal; Legion of Merit; Bronze Star Medal; Commander of the Order of the British Empire (New Zealand)

William Oscar Brice, CBE (December 10, 1898 – January 30, 1972) was a United States Marine Corps General and a veteran of the Korean War, the World War II fight for the Solomon Islands and pre-war expeditionary duty in Haiti and China. He last served at Pearl Harbor as commanding general, Fleet Marine Force, Pacific, after more than three years at Headquarters Marine Corps, Washington, D.C., as Director of Aviation.

The general served in Korea as assistant commander of the 1st Marine Aircraft Wing from April to October 1951. In World War II, when the Marines were fighting at Guadalcanal in America's first offensive against Japan, he commanded all United States Army, Navy, Marine and Royal New Zealand Air Force search, bombing and torpedo planes based on that island. He also headed Marine Aircraft Group 14 during its support of the New Georgia and Bougainville invasions and directed all Solomons-based Army, Navy, Marine and New Zealand fighter operations against Rabaul, Japan's biggest base in the Southwest Pacific.

Brice was awarded the Navy Distinguished Service Medal for actions at Guadalcanal, the Legion of Merit with Combat "V" as head of the Fighter Command, the Air Medal for combat flights in the Solomons between December 1942 and February 1944, and appointed an Honorary Commander of the Order of the British Empire for his service with the Royal New Zealand Air Force. In addition, he earned the Bronze Star Medal with Combat "V" in the final months of the war as chief of staff, air, Fleet Marine Force, Pacific.

== Biography ==
William Brice was born on December 10, 1898, in Columbia, South Carolina. He attended Mt. Zion Institute at Winnsboro, South Carolina from 1913 to 1917.

Brice served in the United States Army in the latter part of World War I. After the war, he resumed his education, graduating from The Citadel at Charleston, South Carolina in 1921. On September 25 of that year, he reported for active duty as a U.S. Marine second lieutenant and was assigned to the Company Officers School at Quantico, Virginia. Graduating from the school in July 1922, he was stationed at the Marine Barracks, Parris Island, South Carolina until May 1923, when he joined the 1st Marine Brigade in Haiti. He returned from that country in February 1924, to enter flight training at Pensacola, Florida, where he was designated an aviator that August.

In June 1925, after further instruction at Pensacola and service with Observation Squadron 3 at Quantico, the Brice began another overseas tour of duty, this time with Scouting Squadron 1 on Guam. From Guam he was ordered to China in April 1927, when most of the squadron was sent there to help protect Americans and other foreigners during the Chinese Civil War. The squadron was withdrawn to the Philippines in May while arrangements for a flying field were made with the Chinese government, and the next month it returned to China to begin operating from Hsin Ho in support of the 3rd Marine Brigade.

Returning to the United States in December 1927, Brice was assigned the following month to Fighter Squadron 9-M at Quantico where he remained until October 1931. On November 2 of that year, he reported aboard the aircraft carrier Lexington in command of Scouting Squadron 15-M, which thus began its service as one of the first two Marine squadrons to be based on Navy carriers. (The other unit, Scouting Squadron 14-M, boarded the "Saratoga" the same day.)

Brice remained on the Lexington until January 1933. In June 1933, after six months at San Diego, he returned to Quantico. There, during the next three years, he served on aviation duty, completed the Junior Course and was a member of the War Plans Section. He entered the Army Air Corps Tactical School at Maxwell Field, Montgomery, Alabama in August 1936, and upon graduation in June of the following year, returned to Quantico to serve as executive officer and later, commander, of Scouting Squadron 1. After that he was an instructor at Pensacola from June 1939 to August 1941, when he returned to Quantico, this time as Operations Officer of Marine Aircraft Group 11 (MAG-11).

Brice moved with MAG-11 to San Diego in December 1941, and there, in March 1942, he assumed command of Marine Aircraft Group 12. He headed that unit until September 1942, when he rejoined Marine Aircraft Group 11 as its commander, and the following month he sailed with it (via New Caledonia) for the New Hebrides Islands, where the group began feeding planes and pilots into Guadalcanal. In December 1942, he moved to Guadalcanal to take command of Marine Aircraft Group 14 and all the search, bombing and torpedo planes based there, remaining until April 1943, when he departed for New Zealand with the group.

Brice returned to the Solomons with MAG-14 in August 1943, to support the New Georgia and Bougainville operations. The group became the nucleus of the Solomons Fighter Command, and that October Brice was assigned additional duties as head of that organization. He relinquished his command of the group in January 1944, but continued to head the Fighter Command until he returned to the United States in March 1944.

In September 1944, after service in various capacities at the Marine Corps Air Station, Cherry Point, North Carolina, General Brice reported to Marine Corps Headquarters, where he served as executive officer of the Division of Plans and Policies until June 1945. The same year he was promoted to brigadier general at the age of 46, which made him the youngest general officer then in the Marine Corps, and that July he arrived in Hawaii to take over as chief of staff, air, Fleet Marine Force, Pacific. He held that post until May 1947, and the following month, returned to Marine Corps Headquarters as assistant director of Marine Aviation.

Leaving headquarters in May 1949, the general's next tour of duty was at Glenview, Illinois, as a commander of Marine Air Reserve Training from that July until April 1951, when he left for Korea to become assistant commander of the 1st Marine Aircraft Wing. Promoted to major general that August, he returned to Hawaii in October as deputy commander, Fleet Marine Force, Pacific, serving in that capacity until March 1952, when he returned to the United States. He became Director of Aviation the following month, and in August 1953, when that post was elevated to a lieutenant general's billet, he was promoted to that rank. He left Washington, D.C., in July 1955, and assumed his final command on September 9 of that year. He retired in 1956 and was advanced to the rank of general.

Brice died on January 30, 1972, at the U.S. Army Hospital, Ft. Jackson, South Carolina.

== Awards ==
Brice was awarded:

Naval Aviator Badge
Navy Distinguished Service Medal	Legion of Merit w/ valor device	Bronze Star w/ valor device	Air Medal
Marine Corps Expeditionary Medal w/ 1 service star	World War I Victory Medal	Yangtze Service Medal	American Defense Service Medal
American Campaign Medal	Asiatic-Pacific Campaign Medal w/ 3 service stars	World War II Victory Medal	National Defense Service Medal
Korean Service Medal w/ 2 service stars	Commander, Order of the British Empire	Korean Presidential Unit Citation	United Nations Korea Medal

Military offices
Preceded by Clayton C. Jerome	Director of Aviation; April 1, 1952 - July 31, 1955	Succeeded by Christian F. Schilt

== See also ==
- List of United States Marine Corps four-star generals
