= Verne J. McCaul =

American Marine Corps general (1903–1968)

Verne James McCaul
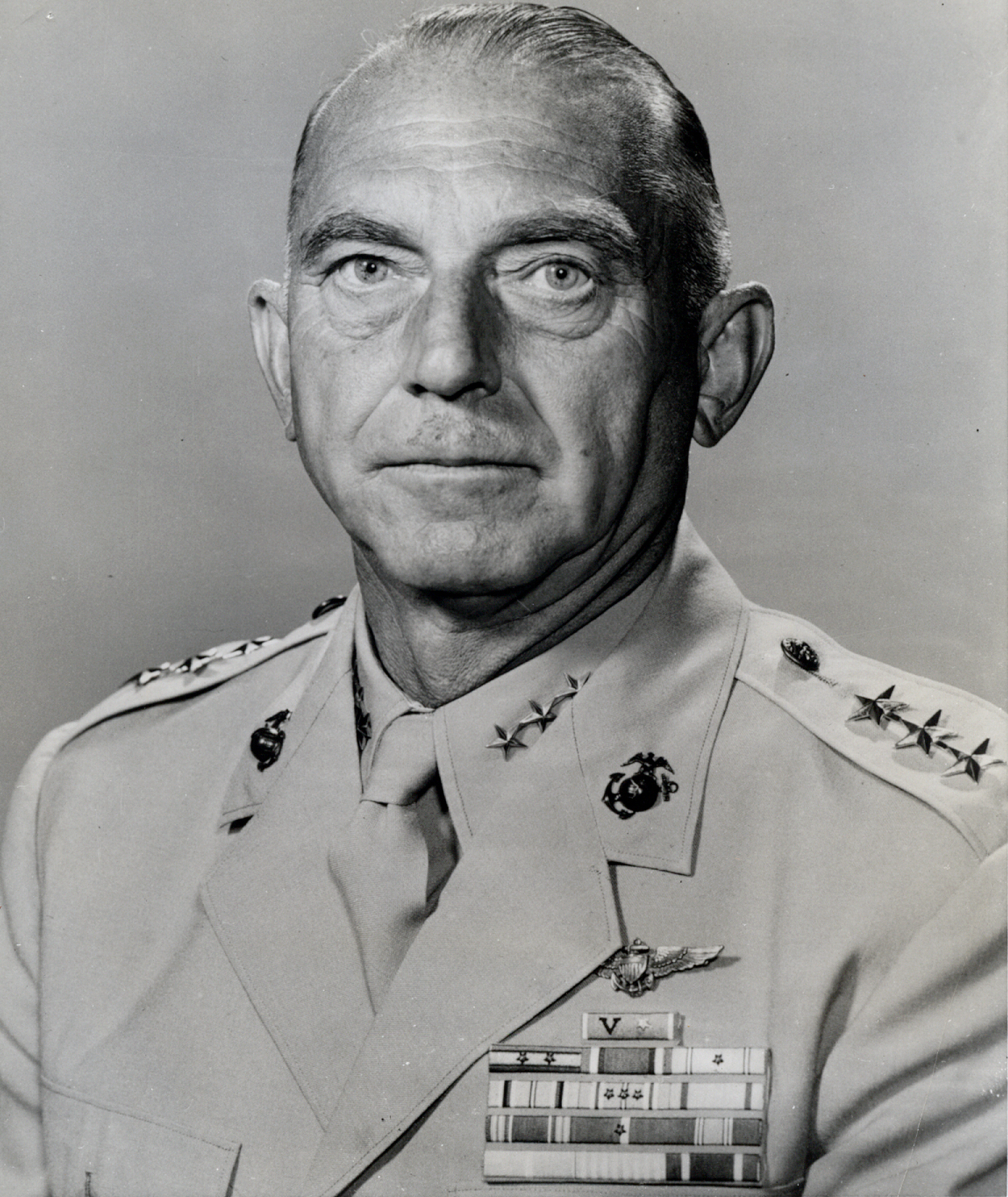
- Born: August 18, 1903; Ayr, North Dakota, U.S.
- Died: March 2, 1968 (aged 64); U.S. Naval Hospital San Diego, California, U.S.
- Military career
- Allegiance: United States of America
- Branch: United States Marine Corps
- Service years: 1925–1960
- Rank: Lieutenant general
- Service number: 0-3987
- Commands: Assistant Commandant of the Marine Corps
- Conflicts: World War II: Battle of Midway; Philippines Campaign (1944–45); Korean War
- Awards: Legion of Merit (2)

Verne James McCaul (August 18, 1903 – March 2, 1968) was a lieutenant general in the United States Marine Corps who served as the Director of Aviation and the 7th Assistant Commandant of the Marine Corps.

== Early years ==
McCaul was born on August 18, 1903, in Ayr, North Dakota, and after joining the Marine Corps participated in World War II. He was commissioned in 1925 and subsequently became a naval aviator.

Major McCaul established Marine Fighting Squadron 221 at San Diego in 1941 and took the unit to Midway Island by year end. On Midway, he joined the staff of Marine Air Group 22, then returned to the U.S. He saw additional Pacific service in the Solomon Islands and the Philippines, where he assumed command of Marine Air Group 12 in early 1945.

After the war, McCaul was promoted to brigadier general, serving in USMC Headquarters. Subsequently, he commanded the 1st and 2nd Marine Aircraft Wings and in 1957 he became the Director of Aviation.

By the time McCaul retired in 1960, he had achieved the rank of lieutenant general. He died on March 2, 1968, at the U.S. Naval Hospital in San Diego, California.

== Awards and decorations ==
During his military career, he was awarded: Legion of Merit with Combat "V" and Gold Star in lieu of a second award, Presidential Unit Citation with one bronze star in lieu of a second award, the Navy Unit Commendation, the American Defense Service Medal with Base clasp, the Asiatic-Pacific Campaign Medal with three bronze stars, the American Campaign Medal, the World War II Victory Medal, the China Service Medal, the National Defense Service Medal, the Korean Service Medal, the United Nations Service Medal, the Philippine Liberation Ribbon with one bronze star, and the Chinese Order of the Cloud and Banner.

Naval Aviator Badge
1st Row	Legion of Merit with one Gold Star and Combat "V"		
2nd Row	Navy Presidential Unit Citation with two Stars	Navy Unit Commendation	American Defense Service Medal with Base Clasp
3rd Row	American Campaign Medal	Asiatic-Pacific Campaign Medal with three service stars	China Service Medal
4th Row	World War II Victory Medal	National Defense Service Medal	Korean Service Medal
5th Row	Order of the Cloud and Banner (Republic of China)	Philippine Liberation Medal with one star	United Nations Korea Medal

Military offices
Preceded by Vernon E. Megee	Assistant Commandant of the Marine Corps; December 1, 1957 — December 31, 1959	Succeeded by John C. Munn
Preceded by Christian F. Schilt	Director of Aviation; April 1, 1957 — December 2, 1957	Succeeded by Samuel S. Jack
Preceded by Albert D. Cooley	Commanding General of the 1st Marine Aircraft Wing; March 1954 — August 1954	Succeeded by Marion L. Dawson

== See also ==
- List of 1st Marine Aircraft Wing commanders
