= List of United States Marine Corps lieutenant generals since 2010 =

Flag of a Marine Corps lieutenant general

The rank of lieutenant general (or three-star general) is the second-highest rank in the United States Marine Corps, and the first to have a specified number of appointments set by statute. It ranks above major general (two-star general) and below general (four-star general).

There have been 84 lieutenant generals in the U.S. Marine Corps since 1 January 2010, nine of whom were promoted to four-star general. All 80 achieved that rank while on active duty in the U.S. Marine Corps. Lieutenant generals entered the Marine Corps via several paths: 42 were commissioned via Naval Reserve Officer Training Corps (NROTC) at a civilian university, 21 via the United States Naval Academy (USNA), 12 via Officer Candidates School (OCS), and nine via NROTC at a senior military college.

== List of generals ==
Entries in the following list of lieutenant generals are indexed by the numerical order in which each officer was promoted to that rank while on active duty, or by an asterisk (*) if the officer did not serve in that rank while on active duty. Each entry lists the general's name, date of rank, (Note: Dates of rank are taken, where available, from the U.S. Navy and Marine Corps register of active and retired commissioned officers. The date listed is that of the officer's first promotion to lieutenant general. If such a date cannot be found, the next date substituted should be that of the officer's assumption of his/her first three-star appointment. Failing which, the officer's first Senate confirmation date to lieutenant general should be substituted.) active-duty positions held while serving at three-star rank, (Note: Positions listed are those held by the officer when promoted to lieutenant general. Dates listed are for the officer's full tenure, which may predate promotion to three-star rank or postdate retirement from active duty. Positions held in an acting capacity are italicized.) number of years of active-duty service at three-star rank (Yrs), (Note: The number of years of active-duty service at three-star rank is approximated by subtracting the year in the "Date of rank" column from the last year in the "Position" column.) year commissioned and source of commission, (Note: Sources of commission are listed in parentheses after the year of commission and include: the Officer Candidates School (OCS); the United States Naval Academy (USNA); Naval Reserve Officer Training Corps (NROTC) at a civilian university; Reserve Officers' Training Corps (ROTC) at a civilian university; and ROTC at a senior military college such as the Virginia Military Institute (VMI), Texas A&M University (Texas A&M), or The Citadel (Citadel).) number of years in commission when promoted to three-star rank (YC), (Note: The number of years in commission before being promoted to three-star rank is approximated by subtracting the year in the "Commission" column from the year in the "Date of rank" column.) and other biographical notes. (Note: Notes include years of birth and death; awards of the Medal of Honor, Congressional Gold Medal, Presidential Medal of Freedom, or honors of similar significance; major government appointments; university presidencies or equivalents; familial relationships with other significant military officers or significant government officials such as U.S. Presidents, cabinet secretaries, U.S. Senators, or state governors; and unusual career events such as premature relief or death in office. Officers who served as enlisted Marines for seven years or more prior to commissioning are also noted.)

List of U.S. Marine Corps lieutenant generals since 2010
#	Name	Photo	Date of rank	Position	Yrs	Commission	YC	Notes
1	Walter E. Gaskin Sr.		22 Mar 2010	Deputy Chairman, NATO Military Committee (DCMC), 2009–2013.; Chairman, NATO Military Committee (CMC), 2011–2012.	3	1974 (NROTC)	36	(1951– ) Secretary, North Carolina Department of Military and Veterans Affairs, 2021–2024.
2	Robert E. Schmidle Jr.		5 Aug 2010	Deputy Commander, U.S. Cyber Command (DCDRUSCYBERCOM), 2010–2012.; Deputy Commandant for Aviation, Headquarters Marine Corps, 2012–2014.; Principal Deputy Director, Cost Assessment and Program Evaluation, Office of the Secretary of Defense, 2014–2016.	6	1976 (NROTC)	34	(c. 1953– )
3	John E. Wissler		5 Aug 2010	Deputy Commandant for Programs and Resources, Headquarters Marine Corps, 2010–2013.; Commander, U.S. Marine Corps Forces, Japan/Commanding General, III Marine Expeditionary Force/Commander, Joint Task Force 505 (COMMARFORJ/CDRJTF-505), 2013.; Commander, U.S. Marine Corps Forces, Japan/Commanding General, III Marine Expeditionary Force (COMMARFORJ), 2013–2015.; Commander, U.S. Marine Corps Forces, Japan/Commanding General, III Marine Expeditionary Force/Commander, Joint Task Force 505 (COMMARFORJ/CDRJTF-505), 2015.; Commander, U.S. Marine Corps Forces Command/Commanding General, Fleet Marine Force, Atlantic (COMMARFORCOM/CG FMFLANT), 2015–2017.	7	1978 (USNA)	32	
4	Richard T. Tryon		29 Oct 2010	Deputy Commandant for Plans, Policies and Operations, Headquarters Marine Corps, 2010–2013.; Commander, U.S. Marine Corps Forces Command/Commander, U.S. Marine Corps Forces Europe/Commander, Marine Corps Bases Atlantic/Commanding General, Fleet Marine Force, Atlantic (COMMARFORCOM/COMMARFOREUR/COMMCBLANT/CG FMFLANT), 2013–2014.	4	1975 (USNA) (Note: Enlisted in 1970, commissioned as second lieutenant in 1975.)	35	(c. 1954– ) Great-grandson of Navy rear admiral James R. Tryon.
5	Robert E. Milstead Jr.		22 Dec 2010	Deputy Commandant for Manpower and Reserve Affairs, Headquarters Marine Corps, 2010–2014.	3	1975 (NROTC)	36	(1951– )
6	Kenneth J. Glueck Jr.		7 Jan 2011	Commander, U.S. Marine Corps Forces, Japan/Commander, Marine Corps Bases Japan/Commanding General, III Marine Expeditionary Force (COMMARFORJ/COMMCBJ), 2011.; Commander, U.S. Marine Corps Forces, Japan/Commander, Marine Corps Bases Japan/Commanding General, III Marine Expeditionary Force/Commander, Joint Task Force 505 (COMMARFORJ/COMMCBJ/CDRJTF-505), 2011–2013.; Commander, U.S. Marine Corps Forces, Japan/Commanding General, III Marine Expeditionary Force/Commander, Joint Task Force 505 (COMMARFORJ/CDRJTF-505), 2011–2013.; Deputy Commandant for Combat Development and Integration, Headquarters Marine Corps/Commanding General, Marine Corps Combat Development Command (CG MCCDC), 2013–2015.	4	1974 (NROTC)	37	(c. 1951– )
*	Robert B. Neller		11 Jan 2011	Director, Operations, Joint Staff, J3, 2011–2012.; Commander, U.S. Marine Forces Central Command (COMUSMARCENT), 2012–2014.; Commander, U.S. Marine Corps Forces Command/Commander, U.S. Marine Corps Forces Europe/Commander, Marine Corps Bases Atlantic/Commanding General, Fleet Marine Force, Atlantic (COMMARFORCOM/COMMARFOREUR/COMMCBLANT/CG FMFLANT), 2014–2015.	4	1975 (OCS) (Note: Commissioned as second lieutenant via the Platoon Leaders Course (PLC).)	35	(1953– ) (Note: Served as Commandant of the Marine Corps (CMC).) Promoted to general, 24 Sep 2015.
7	Richard P. Mills		Jul 2011	Deputy Commandant for Combat Development and Integration, Headquarters Marine Corps/Commanding General, Marine Corps Combat Development Command (CG MCCDC), 2011–2013.; Commander, Marine Forces Reserve/Commander, U.S. Marine Corps Forces Northern Command (COMMARFORRES/COMMARFORNORTH), 2013–2015.	4	1975 (OCS)	36	(1950– )
8	Steven A. Hummer		10 Aug 2011	Commander, Marine Forces Reserve/Commander, U.S. Marine Corps Forces Northern Command (COMMARFORRES/COMMARFORNORTH), 2011–2013.; Deputy to the Commander for Military Operations, U.S. Africa Command, 2013–2015.	4	1977 (NROTC) (Note: Enlisted in 1970; honorably discharged as sergeant, 1973; commissioned as second lieutenant, 1977.)	34	(1952– )
9	Thomas L. Conant		1 Mar 2012	Deputy Commander, U.S. Pacific Command (DCDRUSPACOM), 2012–2014.	2	1975 (NROTC)	37	(c. 1952– )
10	Jon M. Davis		24 May 2012	Deputy Commander, U.S. Cyber Command (DCDRUSCYBERCOM), 2012–2014.; Commander, U.S. Cyber Command (CDRUSCYBERCOM), 2014.; Deputy Commandant for Aviation, Headquarters Marine Corps, 2014–2017.	5	1980 (OCS)	32	(c. 1958– )
11	John A. Toolan Jr.		12 Sep 2012	Commanding General, I Marine Expeditionary Force, 2012–2014.; Commander, U.S. Marine Corps Forces, Pacific/Commanding General, Fleet Marine Force, Pacific (COMMARFORPAC/CG FMFPAC), 2014–2016.	4	1976 (NROTC)	36	(1954– )
12	William M. Faulkner		2 Oct 2012	Deputy Commandant for Installations and Logistics, Headquarters Marine Corps, 2012–2015.	3	1982 (NROTC)	30	(c. 1960– ) (Note: Promoted directly from rank of brigadier general.)
13	Robert R. Ruark		23 May 2013	Director, Logistics, Joint Staff, J4, 2013–2015.; Military Deputy for Readiness to the Under Secretary of Defense for Personnel and Readiness (MILDEP USD(P&R)), 2015–2017.	4	1981 (NROTC)	32	
14	Ronald L. Bailey		14 Jun 2013	Deputy Commandant for Plans, Policies and Operations, Headquarters Marine Corps, 2013–2017.	4	1977 (NROTC)	36	(c. 1953– )
*	Glenn M. Walters		17 Jun 2013	Deputy Commandant for Programs and Resources, Headquarters Marine Corps, 2013–2016.	3	1979 (Citadel)	34	(1957– ) (Note: Served as Assistant Commandant of the Marine Corps (ACMC).) Promoted to general, 2 Aug 2016. President, The Citadel, 2018–present.
*	Kenneth F. McKenzie Jr.		3 Jun 2014	Commander, U.S. Marine Forces Central Command (COMUSMARCENT), 2014–2015.; Director, Strategic Plans and Policy, Joint Staff, J5/Senior Member, U.S. Delegation to the U.N. Military Staff Committee (Sr. Member MSC), 2015–2017.; Director, Joint Staff (DJS), 2017–2019.	5	1979 (Citadel)	35	(1957– ) (Note: Served as a combatant commander (CCDR).) Promoted to general, 28 Mar 2019.
*	David H. Berger		11 Jul 2014	Commanding General, I Marine Expeditionary Force, 2014–2016.; Commander, U.S. Marine Corps Forces, Pacific/Commanding General, Fleet Marine Force, Pacific (COMMARFORPAC/CG FMFPAC), 2016–2018.; Deputy Commandant for Combat Development and Integration, Headquarters Marine Corps/Commanding General, Marine Corps Combat Development Command (CG MCCDC), 2018–2019.	5	1981 (NROTC)	33	(1959– ) Promoted to general, 11 Jul 2019.
15	James B. Laster		11 Dec 2014	Director, Marine Corps Staff (DMCS), 2014–2017.	3	1978 (OCS)	36	
16	Vincent R. Stewart		23 Jan 2015	Director, Defense Intelligence Agency/Commander, Joint Functional Component Command for Intelligence, Surveillance and Reconnaissance (DIRDIA/CDRJFCC ISR), 2015–2016.; Director, Defense Intelligence Agency (DIRDIA), 2016–2017.; Deputy Commander, U.S. Cyber Command (DCDRUSCYBERCOM), 2017–2019. (Note: Stewart held the position concurrently with Army lieutenant general William C. Mayville Jr. from 2017 to 2018. Stewart functioned as deputy for day-to-day running of USCYBERCOM whereas Mayville functioned as deputy in charge of separating USCYBERCOM from the National Security Agency.)	4	1981 (NROTC)	34	(1958–2023) First African-American and Jamaican-American to become director of the Defense Intelligence Agency.
17	Mark A. Brilakis		30 Apr 2015	Deputy Commandant for Manpower and Reserve Affairs, Headquarters Marine Corps, 2015–2017.; Commander, U.S. Marine Corps Forces Command/Commanding General, Fleet Marine Force, Atlantic (COMMARFORCOM/CG FMFLANT), 2017–2019.	4	1981 (OCS)	34	(1958– )
18	Robert S. Walsh		20 Aug 2015	Deputy Commandant for Combat Development and Integration, Headquarters Marine Corps/Commander, Marine Corps Forces Strategic Command/Commanding General, Marine Corps Combat Development Command (COMMARFORSTRAT/CG MCCDC), 2015–2018.	3	1979 (USNA)	36	(c. 1957– )
19	Michael G. Dana		4 Sep 2015	Deputy Commandant for Installations and Logistics, Headquarters Marine Corps, 2015–2018.; Director, Marine Corps Staff (DMCS), 2018–2019.	4	1982 (NROTC)	33	
20	Lawrence D. Nicholson		11 Sep 2015	Commander, U.S. Marine Corps Forces, Japan/Commanding General, III Marine Expeditionary Force (COMMARFORJ), 2015–2018.	3	1979 (Citadel)	36	(1956– )
21	Rex C. McMillian		12 Sep 2015	Commander, Marine Forces Reserve/Commander, U.S. Marine Corps Forces Northern Command (COMMARFORRES/COMMARFORNORTH), 2015–2018.	3	1980 (OCS)	35	(c. 1956– )
22	William D. Beydler		27 Oct 2015	Commander, U.S. Marine Forces Central Command (COMUSMARCENT), 2015–2018.	3	1981 (USNA)	34	(c. 1957– )
*	Gary L. Thomas		29 Jun 2016	Deputy Commandant for Programs and Resources, Headquarters Marine Corps, 2016–2018.	2	1984 (NROTC)	32	(1962– ) Promoted to general, 4 Oct 2018.
23	Lewis A. Craparotta		27 Jul 2016	Commanding General, I Marine Expeditionary Force, 2016–2018.; Commander, U.S. Marine Corps Forces, Pacific/Commanding General, Fleet Marine Force, Pacific (COMMARFORPAC/CG FMFPAC), 2018–2020.; Commanding General, U.S. Marine Corps Training and Education Command (CG TECOM), 2020–2021.	5	1983 (NROTC)	33	(1960– )
24	Joseph L. Osterman		Oct 2016	Deputy Commander, U.S. Special Operations Command (DCDRUSSOCOM), 2016–2018.; Commanding General, I Marine Expeditionary Force, 2018–2020.	4	1982 (NROTC)	34	(1960– )
25	Steven R. Rudder		10 Jul 2017	Deputy Commandant for Aviation, Headquarters Marine Corps, 2017–2020.; Commander, U.S. Marine Corps Forces, Pacific/Commanding General, Fleet Marine Force, Pacific (COMMARFORPAC/CG FMFPAC), 2020–2022.	5	1984 (NROTC)	33	(c. 1962– )
26	Robert F. Hedelund		14 Jul 2017	Commanding General, II Marine Expeditionary Force, 2017–2019.; Commander, U.S. Marine Corps Forces Command/Commanding General, Fleet Marine Force, Atlantic (COMMARFORCOM/CG FMFLANT), 2019–2020.; Commander, U.S. Marine Corps Forces Command/Commander, U.S. Marine Corps Forces Northern Command/Commanding General, Fleet Marine Force, Atlantic (COMMARFORCOM/COMMARFORNORTH/CG FMFLANT), 2020–2021.	4	1983 (NROTC)	34	(1961– )
27	Brian D. Beaudreault		21 Jul 2017	Deputy Commandant for Plans, Policies and Operations, Headquarters Marine Corps, 2017–2019.; Commanding General, II Marine Expeditionary Force, 2019–2021.	4	1983 (NROTC)	34	(1960– )
28	Daniel J. O'Donohue		31 Jul 2017	Deputy Commandant for Information, Headquarters Marine Corps, 2017–2018.; Director, Joint Force Development, Joint Staff, J7, 2018–2020.	2	1984 (NROTC)	33	(c. 1962– )
29	H. Stacy Clardy III		3 Aug 2017	Military Deputy for Readiness to the Under Secretary of Defense for Personnel and Readiness (MILDEP USD(P&R)), 2017–2019.; Commander, U.S. Marine Corps Forces, Japan/Commanding General, III Marine Expeditionary Force (COMMARFORJ), 2019–2021.	4	1983 (NROTC)	34	(1960– )
30	Michael A. Rocco		8 Aug 2017	Deputy Commandant for Manpower and Reserve Affairs, Headquarters Marine Corps, 2017–2020.	3	1983 (NROTC)	34	(c. 1960– )
31	John J. Broadmeadow		1 Sep 2017	Deputy Commander, U.S. Transportation Command (DCDRUSTRANSCOM), 2017–2019.; Director, Marine Corps Staff (DMCS), 2019–2020.	3	1983 (Norwich)	34	(1961– ) President, Norwich University, 2024–present.
32	Charles G. Chiarotti		29 Jun 2018	Deputy Commandant for Installations and Logistics, Headquarters Marine Corps, 2018–2021.	3	1985 (NROTC)	33	
33	Loretta E. Reynolds		2 Jul 2018	Deputy Commandant for Information, Headquarters Marine Corps/Commander, U.S. Marine Corps Forces Strategic Command (COMMARFORSTRAT), 2018–2021.	3	1986 (USNA)	32	(c. 1964– )
34	Carl E. Mundy III		11 Jul 2018	Commander, U.S. Marine Forces Central Command (COMUSMARCENT), 2018–2021.	3	1983 (NROTC)	35	(1960– ) Son of Marine Corps four-star general Carl E. Mundy Jr.
*	Eric M. Smith		2 Aug 2018	Commander, U.S. Marine Corps Forces, Japan/Commanding General, III Marine Expeditionary Force (COMMARFORJ), 2018–2019.; Deputy Commandant for Combat Development and Integration, Headquarters Marine Corps/Commanding General, Marine Corps Combat Development Command (CG MCCDC), 2019–2021.	3	1987 (Texas A&M)	31	(c. 1961– ) Promoted to general, 8 Oct 2021.
35	John K. Love		Sep 2018	U.S. Military Representative, NATO Military Committee (USMILREP), 2018–2021.	3	1984 (NROTC) (Note: Enlisted in 1981, commissioned as second lieutenant in 1984.)	34	
36	John M. Jansen		2 Oct 2018	Deputy Commandant for Programs and Resources, Headquarters Marine Corps, 2018–2021.	3	1986 (OCS)	32	(c. 1964– )
37	George W. Smith Jr.		27 Sep 2018	Senior Military Assistant to the Secretary of Defense (SMA SecDef), 2018–2019.; Deputy Commandant for Plans, Policies and Operations, Headquarters Marine Corps, 2019–2021.; Commanding General, I Marine Expeditionary Force, 2021–2023.	5	1985 (NROTC)	33	(c. 1963– ) Son of Marine Corps major general George W. Smith.
38	David G. Bellon		4 Sep 2019	Commander, Marine Forces Reserve/Commander, U.S. Marine Corps Forces Northern Command (COMMARFORRES/COMMARFORNORTH), 2019–2020.; Commander, Marine Forces Reserve (COMMARFORRES), 2020-2021.; Commander, Marine Forces Reserve/Commander, U.S. Marine Corps Forces, South (COMMARFORRES/COMMARFORSOUTH), 2021–2024.	5	1989 (NROTC)	30	
39	Dennis A. Crall		21 May 2020	Director, Command, Control, Communications and Computers/Cyber and Chief Information Officer, Joint Staff, J6, 2020–2022.	2	1987 (NROTC)	33	(c. 1965– )
40	Mark R. Wise		21 May 2020	Deputy Commandant for Aviation, Headquarters Marine Corps, 2020–2022.	2	1986 (NROTC)	34	(c. 1964– )
41	Karsten S. Heckl		31 Jul 2020	Commanding General, I Marine Expeditionary Force, 2020–2021.; Deputy Commandant for Combat Development and Integration, Headquarters Marine Corps/Commanding General, Marine Corps Combat Development Command (CG MCCDC), 2021–2024.	4	1988 (NROTC)	32	(1964– )
42	David A. Ottignon		4 Aug 2020	Deputy Commandant for Manpower and Reserve Affairs, Headquarters Marine Corps, 2020–2022.; Commanding General, II Marine Expeditionary Force, 2022–2024.	4	1987 (NROTC)	33	
43	Michael S. Groen		1 Oct 2020	Director, Joint Artificial Intelligence Center (DIRJAIC), 2020–2022.	2	1986 (NROTC)	34	(1964– )
44	Matthew G. Glavy		7 Jul 2021	Deputy Commandant for Information, Headquarters Marine Corps/Commander, U.S. Marine Corps Forces Strategic Command (COMMARFORSTRAT), 2021–2023.; Deputy Commandant for Information, Headquarters Marine Corps/Director, Marine Corps Intelligence/Commander, U.S. Marine Corps Forces Strategic Command (DMCI/COMMARFORSTRAT), 2023–2024.	3	1986 (USNA)	35	(c. 1964– )
45	William M. Jurney		8 Jul 2021	Commanding General, II Marine Expeditionary Force, 2021–2022.; Commander, U.S. Marine Corps Forces, Pacific/Commanding General, Fleet Marine Force, Pacific (COMMARFORPAC/CG FMFPAC), 2022–2024.	3	1988 (OCS) (Note: Commissioned as second lieutenant via the Marine Enlisted Commissioning Education Program (MECEP).)	33	(c. 1966– )
46	Edward D. Banta		9 Jul 2021	Deputy Commandant for Installations and Logistics, Headquarters Marine Corps, 2021–2024.	3	1986 (OCS)	35	
47	David J. Furness		Aug 2021	Deputy Commandant for Plans, Policies and Operations, Headquarters Marine Corps, 2021–2023.	2	1987 (VMI)	34	
48	Kevin M. Iiams		2 Aug 2021	Commanding General, U.S. Marine Corps Training and Education Command (CG TECOM), 2021–2024.	3	1986 (USNA)	35	(c. 1964– )
*	Christopher J. Mahoney		9 Aug 2021	Deputy Commandant for Programs and Resources, Headquarters Marine Corps, 2021–2023.	2	1987 (NROTC)	34	(c. 1965– ) Promoted to general, 2 Nov 2023.
49	Stephen D. Sklenka		16 Aug 2021	Deputy Commander, U.S. Indo-Pacific Command (DCDRUSINDOPACOM), 2021–2024.; Deputy Commandant for Installations and Logistics, Headquarters Marine Corps, 2024–present.	4	1988 (USNA)	33	(1966– )
50	James W. Bierman Jr.		9 Nov 2021	Commander, U.S. Marine Corps Forces, Japan/Commanding General, III Marine Expeditionary Force (COMMARFORJ), 2021–2024.; Deputy Commandant for Plans, Policies and Operations, Headquarters Marine Corps, 2024–2025.	4	1987 (VMI)	34	(c. 1965– ) Commandant of the Corps of Cadets, Texas A&M University, 2025–present.
*	Michael E. Langley		10 Nov 2021	Commander, U.S. Marine Corps Forces Command/Commander, U.S. Marine Corps Forces Northern Command/Commanding General, Fleet Marine Force, Atlantic (COMMARFORCOM/COMMARFORNORTH/CG FMFLANT), 2021–2022.	1	1985 (OCS)	36	(c. 1963– ) Promoted to general, 6 Aug 2022.
51	Gregg P. Olson		17 Feb 2022	Director, Marine Corps Staff (DMCS), 2020–2024.	2	1985 (USNA)	37	(1963– )
52	Dimitri Henry		1 Jun 2022	Director, Intelligence, Joint Staff, J2, 2022–2025.	3	1988 (Texas A&M)	34	(c. 1963– ) Served seven years in the enlisted ranks before receiving his commission in 1988.
53	Michael S. Cederholm		27 Jul 2022	Deputy Commandant for Aviation, Headquarters Marine Corps, 2022–2024.; Commanding General, I Marine Expeditionary Force, 2024–2025.	3	1989 (NROTC)	33	(c. 1966– )
54	Brian W. Cavanaugh		30 Aug 2022	Commander, U.S. Marine Corps Forces Command/Commander, U.S. Marine Corps Forces Northern Command/Commanding General, Fleet Marine Force, Atlantic (COMMARFORCOM/COMMARFORNORTH/CG FMFLANT), 2022–2024.	2	1990 (USNA)	32	(1968– )
55	James F. Glynn		5 Oct 2022	Deputy Commandant for Manpower and Reserve Affairs, Headquarters Marine Corps, 2022–2024.; Commander, U.S. Marine Corps Forces, Pacific/Commanding General, Fleet Marine Force, Pacific (COMMARFORPAC/CG FMFPAC), 2024–present.	4	1989 (USNA)	33	
56	Francis L. Donovan		15 Dec 2022	Vice Commander, U.S. Special Operations Command (VCDRUSSOCOM), 2022–2026.	4	1988 (NROTC)	34	
57	James H. Adams III		5 Dec 2023	Deputy Commandant for Programs and Resources, Headquarters Marine Corps, 2023-2026.; Director, Defense Intelligence Agency (DIRDIA), 2026–present.	3	1991 (USNA)	32	(c. 1969– )
58	Gregory L. Masiello		20 Dec 2023	Director, Defense Contract Management Agency (DIRDCMA), 2023–2025.; Program Executive Officer, F-35 Lightning II Joint Program Office (PEO F-35), 2025–present.	3	1987 (USNA)	36	
59	Roger B. Turner Jr.		26 Jan 2024	Commander, U.S. Marine Corps Forces, Japan/Commanding General, III Marine Expeditionary Force (COMMARFORJ), 2024–2026.	2	1989 (NROTC) (Note: Enlisted in 1984, commissioned as second lieutenant in 1989.)	35	
60	Bradford J. Gering		16 Feb 2024	Deputy Commandant for Aviation, Headquarters Marine Corps, 2024–2025.	1	1989 (OCS)	35	Promoted to general, 1 Oct 2025.
61	Leonard F. Anderson IV		21 Mar 2024	Commander, Marine Forces Reserve/Commander, U.S. Marine Corps Forces, South (COMMARFORRES/COMMARFORSOUTH), 2024–present.	2	1993 (NROTC)	31	(c. 1971– )
62	Melvin G. Carter		1 Aug 2024	Deputy Commandant for Information, Headquarters Marine Corps/Director, Marine Corps Intelligence/Commander, U.S. Marine Corps Forces Strategic Command (DMCI/COMMARFORSTRAT), 2024–2026.; Advisor for Military Affairs to the Director of National Intelligence, 2026-present.	2	1992 (NROTC) (Note: Enlisted in 1985, commissioned as second lieutenant in 1992.)	32	(c. 1965– )
63	Calvert L. Worth Jr.		2 Aug 2024	Commanding General, II Marine Expeditionary Force, 2024–2026.; Commander, U.S. Marine Corps Forces Command/Commander, U.S. Marine Corps Forces Northern Command/Commanding General, Fleet Marine Force, Atlantic (COMMARFORCOM/COMMARFORNORTH/CG FMFLANT), 2026-present.	2	1991 (OCS)	33	
64	Roberta L. Shea		6 Aug 2024	Commander, U.S. Marine Corps Forces Command/Commander, U.S. Marine Corps Forces Northern Command/Commanding General, Fleet Marine Force, Atlantic (COMMARFORCOM/COMMARFORNORTH/CG FMFLANT), 2024–2026.	2	1991 (USNA) (Note: Enlisted in 1985, commissioned as second lieutenant in 1991.)	33	(c. 1967– )
65	Michael J. Borgschulte		7 Aug 2024	Deputy Commandant for Manpower and Reserve Affairs, Headquarters Marine Corps, 2024–2025.; Superintendent of the United States Naval Academy, 2025-present.	2	1991 (USNA)	33	(c. 1969– )
66	Eric E. Austin		9 Aug 2024	Deputy Commandant for Combat Development and Integration, Headquarters Marine Corps/Commanding General, Marine Corps Combat Development Command (CG MCCDC), 2024–present.	2	1991 (USNA)	33	(c. 1969– )
67	Benjamin T. Watson		9 Aug 2024	Commanding General, U.S. Marine Corps Training and Education Command (CG TECOM), 2024–2025.; Deputy Commandant for Training and Education, Headquarters Marine Corps/Commanding General, U.S. Marine Corps Training and Education Command (CG TECOM), 2025-2026.; Commander, U.S. Marine Corps Forces, Japan/Commanding General, III Marine Expeditionary Force (COMMARFORJ), 2026-presen.	2	1991 (NROTC)	33	(c. 1967– )
68	Paul J. Rock Jr.		3 Sep 2024	Director, Marine Corps Staff (DMCS), 2024–present.	2	1988 (USNA)	36	
69	Robert C. Fulford		26 Nov 2024	Deputy Commander, U.S. European Command (DCDRUSEUCOM), 2024–2026.; Commanding General, II Marine Expeditionary Force, 2026–present.	2	1992 (USNA)	32	Son of Marine Corps four-star general Carlton W. Fulford Jr..
70	Jay M. Bargeron		29 Jun 2025	Deputy Commandant for Plans, Policies and Operations, Headquarters Marine Corps, 2025–present.	1	1989 (NROTC) (Note: Enlisted in 1984, commissioned as second lieutenant in 1989.)	36	
71	William J. Bowers		2 Aug 2025	Deputy Commandant for Manpower and Reserve Affairs, Headquarters Marine Corps, 2025–present.	1	1990 (VMI)	35	
72	Stephen E. Liszewski		16 Aug 2025	Director of the Joint Staff (DJS), 2025.; Director, Joint Force Development, Joint Staff, J7, 2025–present.	1	1990 (USNA)	35	
73	Christian F. Wortman		21 Aug 2025	Commanding General, I Marine Expeditionary Force, 2025–present.	1	1991 (USNA)	34	
74	David L. Odom		28 Aug 2025	Director, Operations, Joint Staff, J3, 2025–present.	1	1991 (Citadel)	34	
76	William H. Swan		2 Oct 2025	Deputy Commandant for Aviation, Headquarters Marine Corps, 2025-present.	1	1991 (NROTC)	34	
77	Joseph R. Clearfield		2 Oct 2025	Commander, U.S. Marine Forces Central Command (COMUSMARCENT), 2025-present.	1	1993 (NROTC)	32	
78	Lorna M. Mahlock		2 Mar 2026	Deputy Commander of the United States Cyber Command (CYBERCOM), 2026-present.	0	1991 (NROTC)	35	
79	James B. Wellons		2 May 2026	Deputy Commandant for Programs and Resources, Headquarters Marine Corps, 2026-present.	0	1993 (OCS)	33	
80	Thomas B. Savage		2 Jun 2026	Deputy Commandant for Training and Education, Headquarters Marine Corps/Commanding General, U.S. Marine Corps Training and Education Command (CG TECOM), 2026-present.	0	1991 (OCS)	35	

== Background ==
=== Modern use of the rank ===
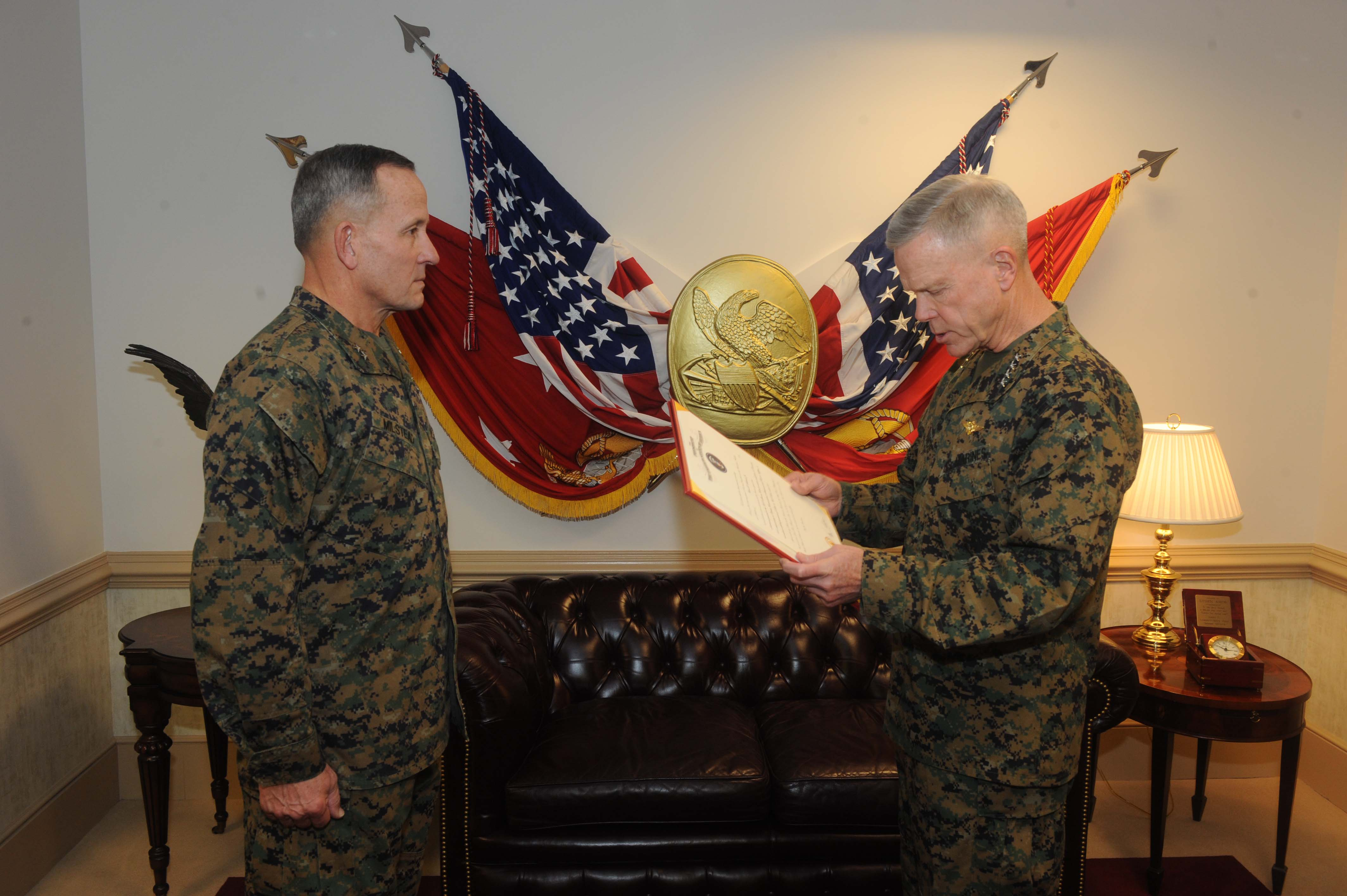
Gen James F. Amos, commandant of the Marine Corps, reads MajGen Robert E. Milstead Jr. his promotion warrant to lieutenant general on 3 January 2010.

Three-star billets in the United States Marine Corps include commanders of high-level Marine Corps commands, such as the marine expeditionary forces and Marine service component commands. Senior staff officers under the Headquarters Marine Corps (HQMC) directly reporting to the commandant and/or the assistant commandant may also hold the rank of lieutenant general.

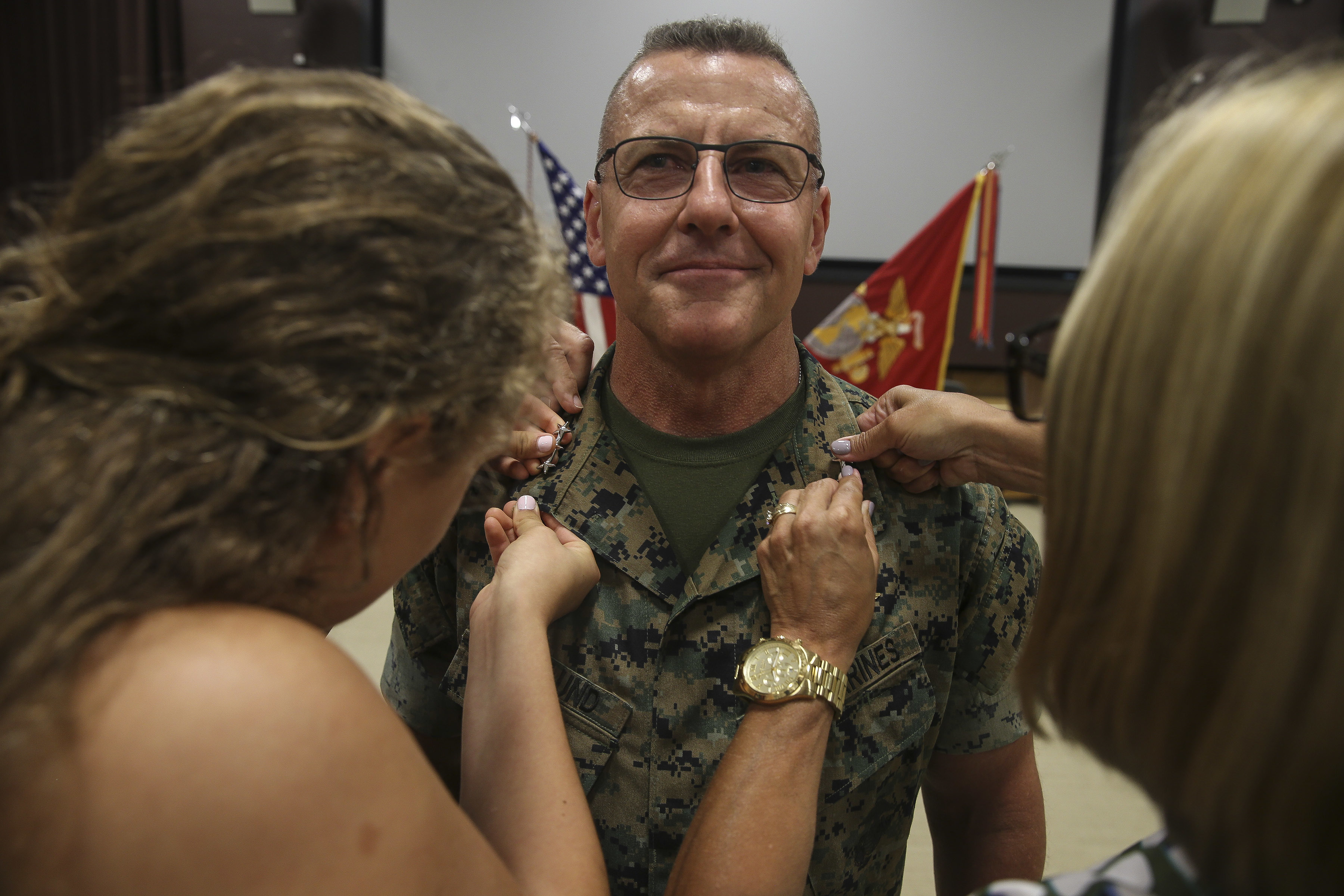
LtGen Robert F. Hedelund, commanding general, II Marine Expeditionary Force, is pinned by family members during his promotion ceremony on 14 July 2017.

About 30 to 50 joint service three-star billets exist at any given time that can be occupied by a Marine Corps lieutenant general, among the most prestigious being the director of the Joint Staff (DJS), principal staff advisor to the chairman of the Joint Chiefs of Staff and historically considered a stepping stone to four-star rank. All deputy commanders of the unified combatant commands are of three-star rank, (Note: The deputy commander of U.S. European Command was a four-star position until 2007, when it was reduced in rank to make way for the establishment of U.S. Africa Command, commanded by a four-star officer. The last four-star deputy commander of USEUCOM, General William E. Ward, also became the first commander of USAFRICOM.) as are directors of Defense Agencies not headed by a civilian such as the director of the Defense Intelligence Agency (DIRDIA). Internationally-based three-star positions include the United States military representative to the NATO Military Committee (USMILREP) and the security coordinator for Israel and the Palestinian National Authority. All nominees for three-star rank must be confirmed via majority by the Senate before the appointee can take office and thus assume the rank.

==== Statutory limits, elevations and reductions ====
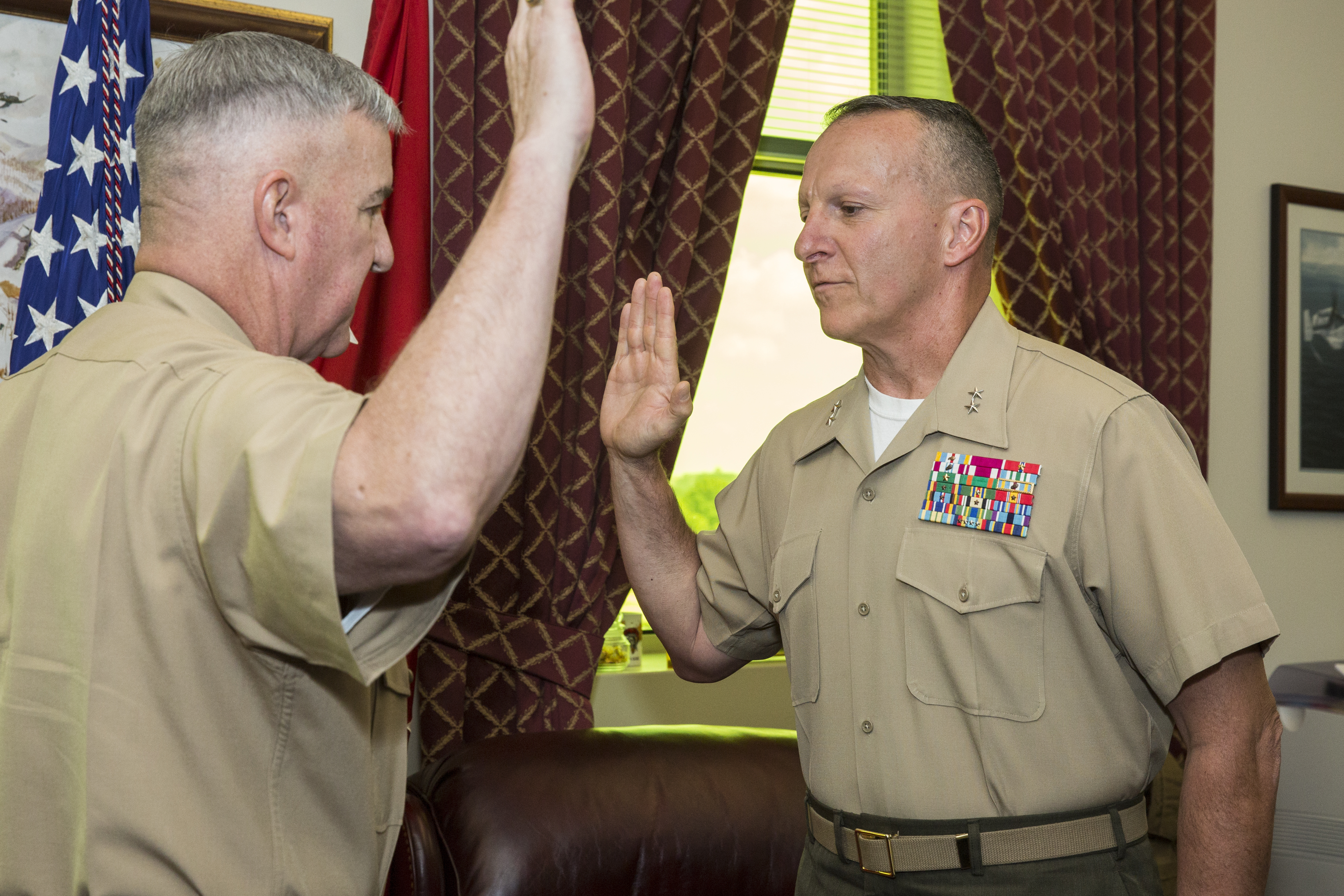
Gen Glenn M. Walters, assistant commandant of the Marine Corps promotes MajGen Charles G. Chiarotti to lieutenant general at the Pentagon, 29 June 2018.

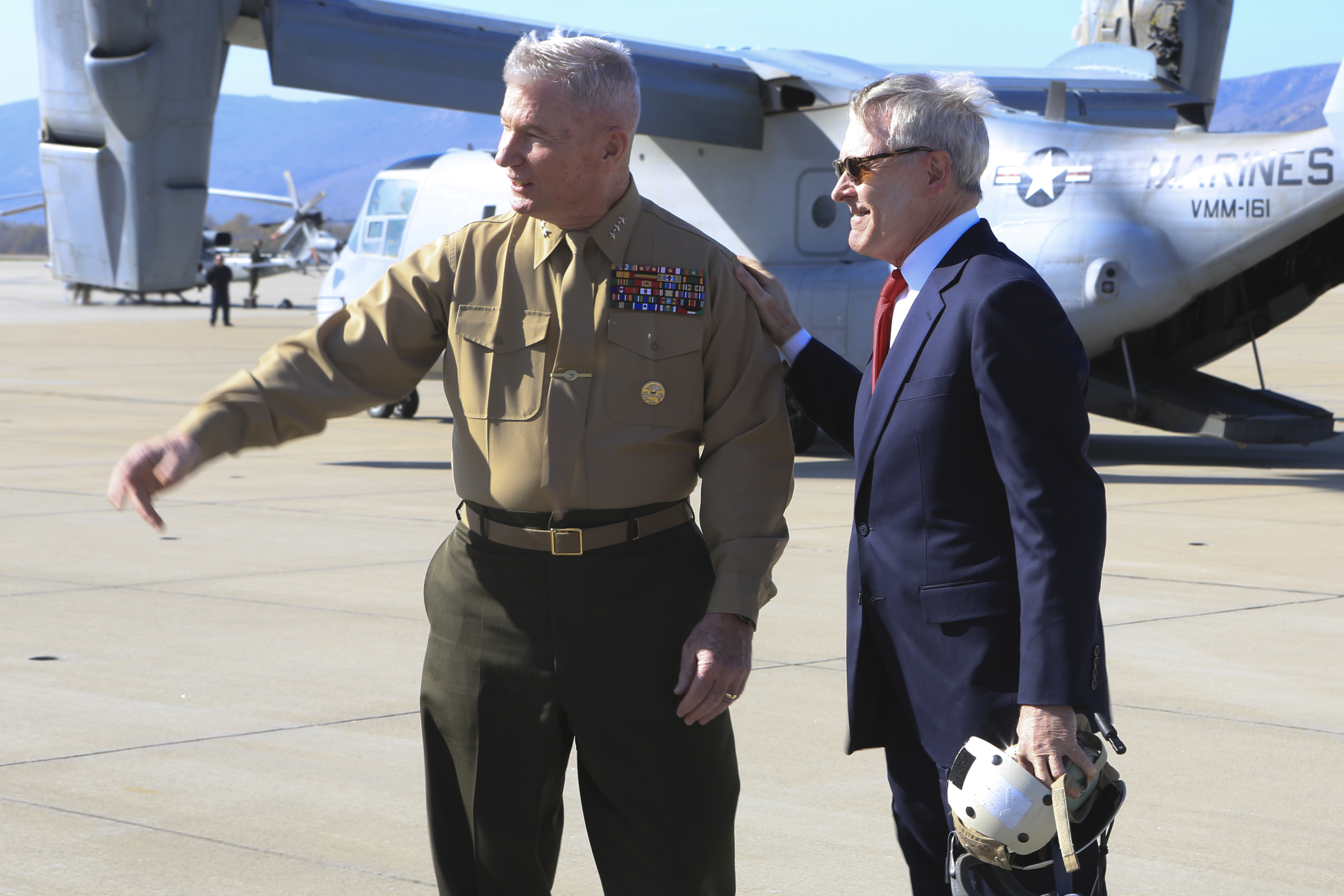
Secretary of the Navy Ray Mabus greets LtGen John A. Toolan Jr. at Marine Corps Air Station Camp Pendleton on 10 January 2014.

The U.S. Code states that no more than 17 officers in the U.S. Marine Corps may hold the rank of lieutenant general on the active duty list, aside from those on joint duty assignments. Three-star positions can be elevated to four-star status or reduced to two-star status where deemed necessary, either to highlight their increasing importance to the defense apparatus (or lack thereof) or to achieve parity with equivalent commands in other services or regions.

Few three-star positions are set by statute, leading to their increased volatility as they do not require congressional approval to be downgraded. It is common practice in the Marine Corps to dual-hat operational commands under a single commander to remain under the statutory limit for three-star positions, and shifting them around if necessary to facilitate efficient command and control of Marine units.

- In 2012, the commanding general of I Marine Expeditionary Force ceased to be dual-hatted as commander of U.S. Marine Forces Central Command (USMARCENT) (Note: Previously held by the Commander, U.S. Marine Corps Forces, Pacific, the USMARCENT dual-hat was transferred to the Commanding General, I Marine Expeditionary Force in August 2005 to improve efficiency, as I MEF's Camp Pendleton, California headquarters was nearer to USMARCENT's headquarters in Tampa, Florida than MARFORPAC's headquarters in Camp H. M. Smith, Hawaii.) to ensure that a single service component commander reported to the commander of CENTCOM, as CG, I MEF already reported to the Commander, U.S. Indo-Pacific Command. Lieutenant General Thomas D. Waldhauser thereafter relinquished command of USMARCENT to Lieutenant General Robert B. Neller and I MEF to Lieutenant General John A. Toolan in September 2012.
- In 2020, U.S. Marine Corps Training and Education Command (TECOM) was raised from a two-star to three-star command reporting directly to the commandant of the Marine Corps after separating from Marine Corps Combat Development Command of which it was previously subordinate to. Lieutenant General Lewis A. Craparotta assumed command from Major General William F. Mullen III in August 2020.
- The commander of Marine Forces Reserve (MARFORRES) was dual-hatted as the commander of Marine Forces North (MARFORNORTH) since the 2000s. With the retirement of Lieutenant General Rex C. McMillian in 2018 and subsequent transfer of MARFORNORTH to U.S. Marine Corps Forces Command (MARFORCOM), MARFORRES became a two-star command. In September 2019, Lieutenant General David Bellon assumed command of MARFORRES from Colonel Michael E. McWilliams, restoring the command's three-star status and with a command realignment in early 2021 assumed command of U.S. Marine Corps Forces South (MARFORSOUTH).

==== Senate confirmations ====
Military nominations are considered by the Senate Armed Services Committee. While it is rare for three-star or four-star nominations to face even token opposition in the Senate, nominations that do face opposition due to controversy surrounding the nominee in question are typically withdrawn. Nominations that are not withdrawn are allowed to expire without action at the end of the legislative session.

- For example, the Senate declined to schedule a vote for Major General Charles M. Gurganus to be promoted to lieutenant general in 2013 and assigned as director of the Marine Corps staff, due to concerns of negligence leading to the September 2012 Camp Bastion raid.
- In 2014, Major General Michael R. Regner, selected for assignment as deputy commandant for manpower and reserve affairs, had his nomination for promotion to lieutenant general returned to the president partially due to concerns of misuse of authority, including having subordinates perform menial tasks at his behest. Regner subsequently retired in February 2016.

Additionally, events that take place after Senate confirmation may still delay or even prevent the nominee from assuming office.

- For example, Major General John G. Rossi, who had been confirmed for promotion to lieutenant general and assignment as the commanding general of the U.S. Army Space and Missile Defense Command in April 2016 committed suicide two days before his scheduled promotion and assumption of command. As a result, the then incumbent commander of USASMDC, Lieutenant General David L. Mann, remained in command beyond statutory term limits until another nominee, Major General James H. Dickinson was confirmed by the Senate.

== Legislative history ==
The following list of Congressional legislation includes all acts of Congress pertaining to appointments to the grade of lieutenant general in the United States Marine Corps since 2010. (Note: Legislative history compiled from the U.S. Congress official website and U.S. Government Publishing Office official website.)

Each entry lists an act of Congress, its citation in the United States Statutes at Large or Public Law number, and a summary of the act's relevance, with officers affected by the act bracketed where applicable. Positions listed without reference to rank are assumed to be eligible for officers of three-star grade or higher.

List of legislation on appointments of lieutenant generals since 2010
Legislation	Citation	Summary
Act of 7 January 2011 [Ike Skelton National Defense Authorization Act for Fiscal Year 2011]	124 Stat. 4209; 124 Stat. 4210	Authorized officers frocked to grade of lieutenant general or general to wear the insignia of that grade for up to 14 days before assuming position for which that grade is authorized.; Repealed 30-day waiting period following congressional notification before officers below grade of lieutenant general or vice admiral may wear insignia of the next higher grade.
Act of 23 December 2016 [National Defense Authorization Act for Fiscal Year 2017]	130 Stat. 2102; 130 Stat. 2103; 130 Stat. 2104; 130 Stat. 2107	Increased number of officers in the Marine Corps that may be appointed in grade of lieutenant general from 15 to 17.; Increased number of deputy commandants attached to Headquarters Marine Corps from 6 to 7 (Daniel J. O'Donohue).; Repealed authorization for the Chief of Staff to the President, if a general or flag officer of the United States Armed Forces, to be designated a position of importance and responsibility with grade of lieutenant general or vice admiral.; Removed statutory requirement for the director of the Department of Defense Test Resource Management Center, if a commissioned officer, to hold grade of lieutenant general or vice admiral.; Repealed statutory requirement for the director of the Missile Defense Agency, if a commissioned officer, to hold grade of lieutenant general or vice admiral.; Repealed statutory requirement for senior members of the United Nations Military Staff Committee to hold grade of lieutenant general or vice admiral.; Repealed statutory requirement for the principal military deputy to the assistant secretary of the Navy (research, development and acquisition) to hold grade of lieutenant general in the Marine Corps or vice admiral in the Navy.
Act of 12 December 2019 [National Defense Authorization Act for Fiscal Year 2020]	133 Stat. 1346	Required advice and consent of the Senate on any proposal by the secretary of defense to increase the retired grade of any military officer through the reopening of the determination or certification of said officer's retired grade.

== See also ==
- Lieutenant general (United States)
- General officers in the United States
- List of active duty United States four-star officers
- List of active duty United States three-star officers
- List of United States Marine Corps four-star generals
- List of United States Marine Corps lieutenant generals on active duty before 1960
- List of United States Marine Corps lieutenant generals from 2000 to 2009
- List of United States military leaders by rank
- Staff (military)
