= Chiarotti =

Chiarotti is a surname. Notable people with the surname include:

- Ademir Chiarotti (1948–2013), Brazilian professional footballer
- Andrea Chiarotti (1966–2018), Italian ice sledge hockey player and coach
- Charles Chiarotti, retired United States Marine Corps lieutenant general
- Douglas Chiarotti (born 1970), Brazilian former volleyball player
- Susana Chiarotti (born 1946), Argentine lawyer and women's rights activist
- Alberto Chiarotti (born 1935–2022), Italian wine businessman and entrepreneur
