= General Wise =

General Wise may refer to:

- Henry A. Wise (1806–1876), Confederate States Army brigadier general
- Mark R. Wise (fl. 1980s–2020s), U.S. Marine Corps lieutenant general

== See also ==
- Attorney General Wise (disambiguation)
