= Mark Wise =

Mark Wise may refer to:

- Mark B. Wise, Canadian-American theoretical physicist
- Mark R. Wise, United States Marine Corps general
