= David Bellon =

U.S. Marine Corps general

David G. Bellon
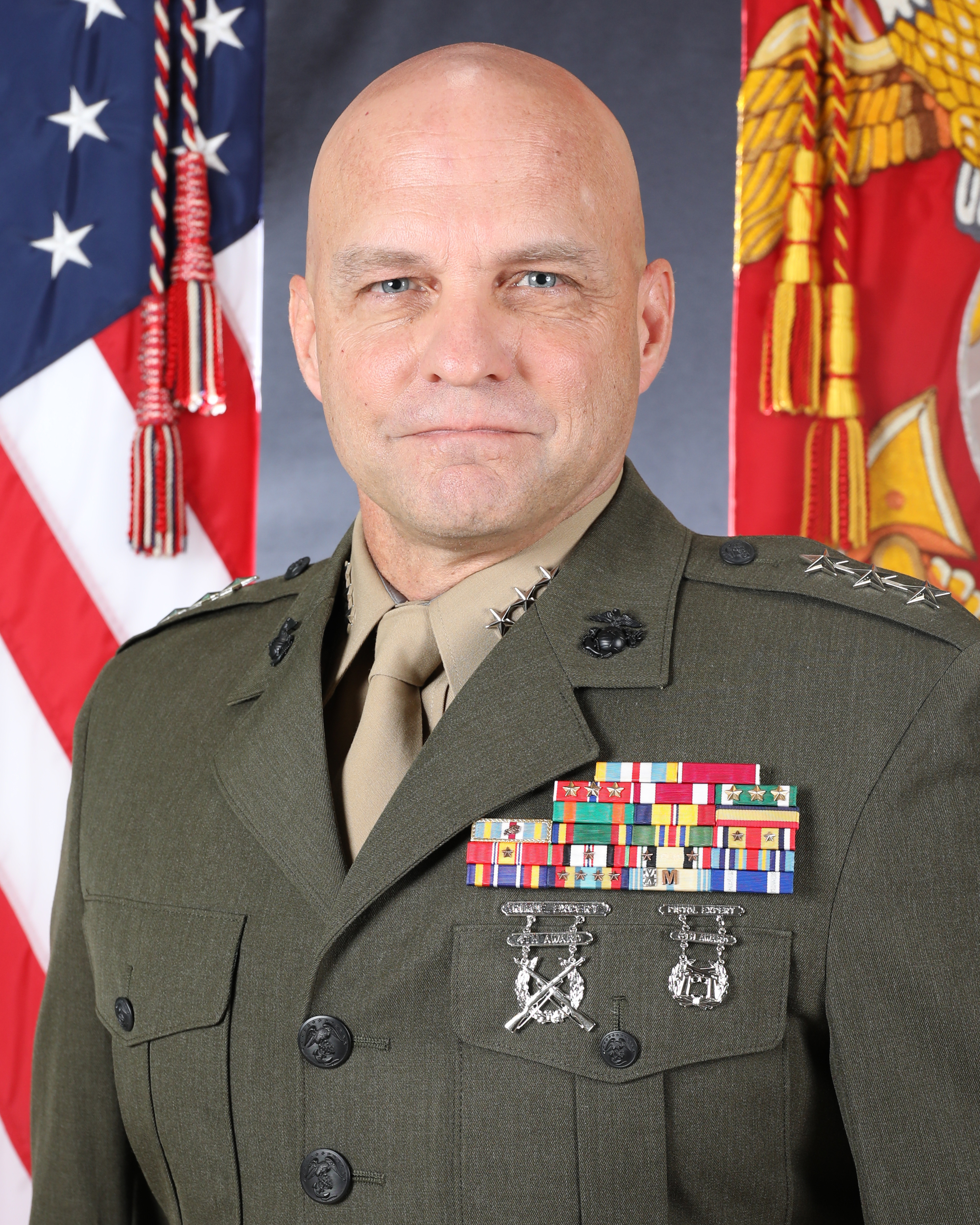
- Born: Fort Polk, Louisiana, U.S.
- Military career
- Allegiance: United States
- Branch: United States Marine Corps
- Service years: 1991–2024
- Rank: Lieutenant General
- Commands: United States Marine Corps Reserve; Marine Corps Forces South; 3rd Battalion, 23rd Marines
- Conflicts: Iraq War; War in Afghanistan
- Awards: Defense Superior Service Medal; Legion of Merit; Bronze Star Medal (4)

David G. Bellon is a retired United States Marine Corps Lieutenant General who served as the Commander of the United States Marine Corps Reserve and Marine Corps Forces, South. He previously commanded Marine Forces South from May 2017 to August 2018, ceding control to Major General Michael F. Fahey III.

Bellon assumed command of Marine Forces Reserve from interim commander Brigadier General Michael S. Martin in September after taking over as Interim from LtGen Michael A. Rocco, USMC, upcoming retirement after over 37 years of service. In 2017, Rocco was promoted to Lieutenant General and assumed the duties of Deputy Commandant for Manpower and Reserve Affairs.

He is scheduled to retire from active duty.

Military offices
Preceded by Kevin M. Iiams	Commander of the Marine Corps Forces South; 2017–2018	Succeeded by Michael F. Fahey III
Preceded by Antonio M. Fletcher	Director of Strategy, Policy, and Plans of the United States Southern Command; 2018–2019	Succeeded by Rick A. Uribe
Preceded by Michael S. Martin	Commander of the United States Marine Corps Reserve; 2019–2024	Succeeded by Len Anderson IV
Preceded by Michael E. McWilliams	Commander of the Marine Corps Forces South; 2021–2024	Succeeded by Len Anderson IV
