= Kevin Iiams =

U.S. Marine Corps general officer

Kevin M. Iiams
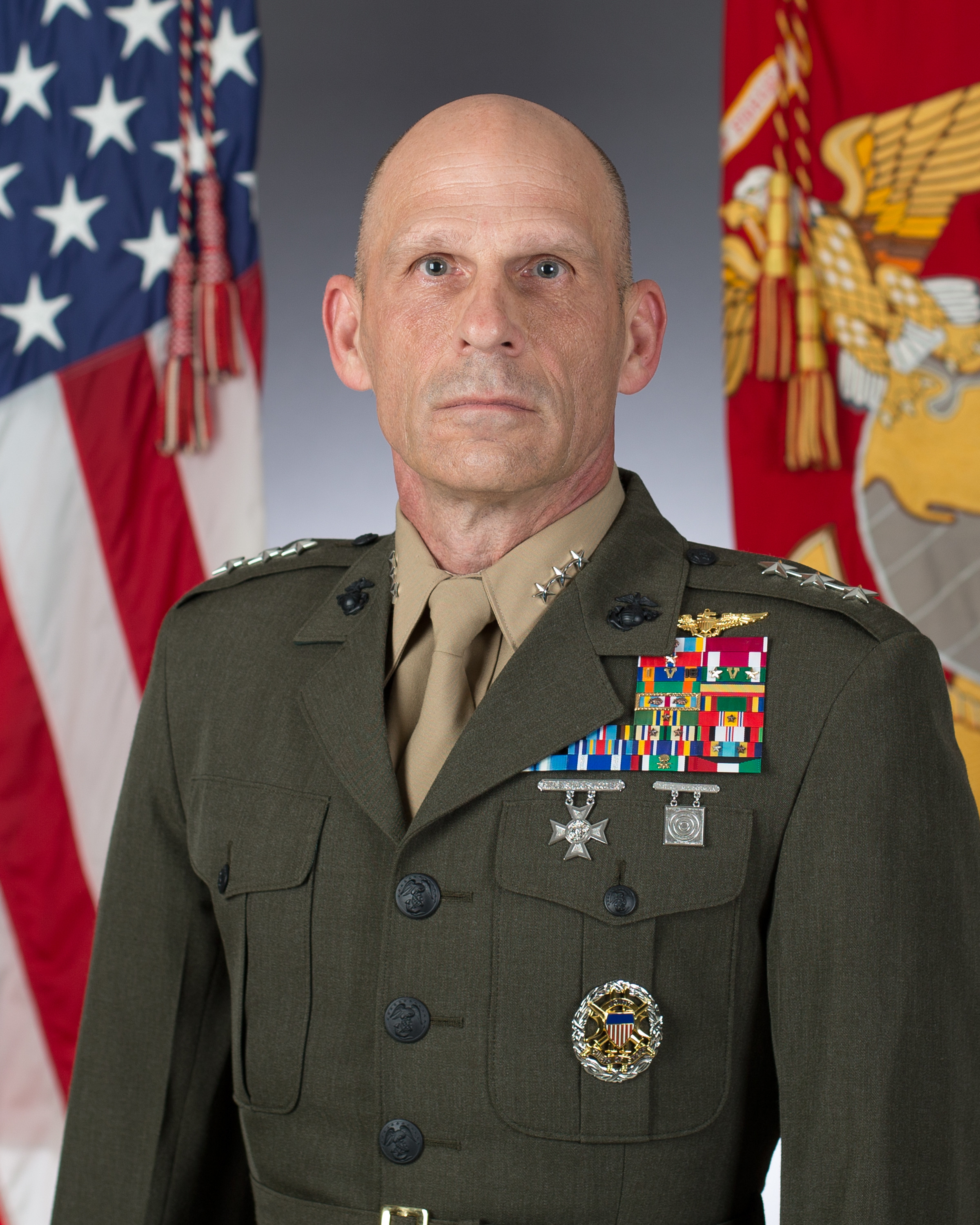
- Military career
- Allegiance: United States
- Branch: United States Marine Corps
- Service years: 1986–2024
- Rank: Lieutenant General
- Commands: United States Marine Corps Training and Education Command; 3d Marine Aircraft Wing; U.S. Marine Corps Training and Education Command; United States Marine Corps Forces, South

Kevin M. Iiams is a retired United States Marine Corps lieutenant general who served as the commander of the United States Marine Corps Training and Education Command from 2021 to 2024. He most recently served as the Assistant Deputy Commandant for Combat Development and Integration of the United States Marine Corps and Deputy Commanding General of the Marine Corps Combat Development Command. Previously, he was the Commanding General of the 3d Marine Aircraft Wing. In April 2021, he was nominated for promotion to lieutenant general and assignment to reassume his command of the U.S. Marine Corps Training and Education Command, replacing LtGen Lewis A. Craparotta.

== Awards and decorations ==

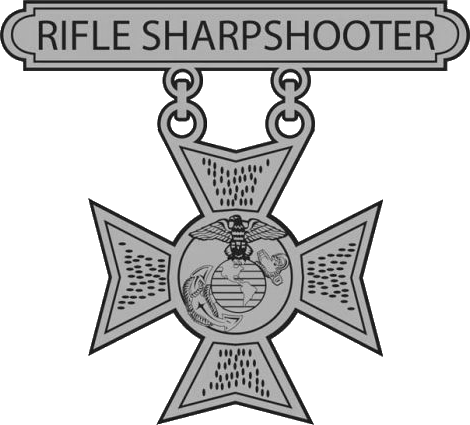

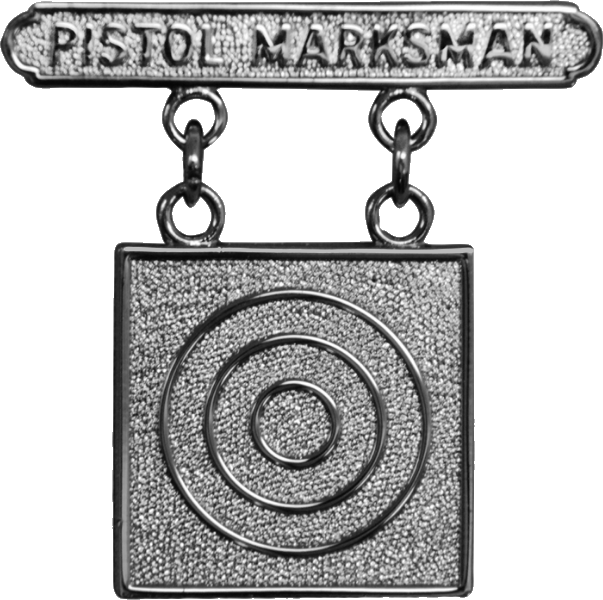

Naval Aviator Badge
Defense Superior Service Medal with one bronze oak leaf cluster		Legion of Merit	
Bronze Star Medal with one gold award star	Meritorious Service Medal	Air Medal with Combat "V", gold award numeral 1 and bronze Strike/Flight numerals 18	Navy Commendation Medal with Combat V and two award stars
Navy Achievement Medal	Navy Presidential Unit Citation	Joint Meritorious Unit Award with two oak leaf clusters	Navy Unit Commendation
Navy Meritorious Unit Commendation with one bronze service star	National Defense Service Medal with service star	Armed Forces Expeditionary Medal	Southwest Asia Service Medal with two service stars
Afghanistan Campaign Medal	Global War on Terrorism Expeditionary Medal	Global War on Terrorism Service Medal	Navy Sea Service Deployment Ribbon with one silver and one bronze service stars
Navy Arctic Service Ribbon	NATO Medal for service with ISAF	Kuwait Liberation Medal (Saudi Arabia)	Kuwait Liberation Medal (Kuwait)
Rifle Sharpshooter Badge		Pistol Marksman Badge	
Office of the Joint Chiefs of Staff Identification Badge

Military offices
Preceded by Eric M. Smith	Commanding General of the United States Marine Corps Forces, South; 2016–2017	Succeeded by David G. Bellon
Preceded by James W. Lukeman	Commanding General of the U.S. Marine Corps Training and Education Command; 2017–2018	Succeeded by William F. Mullen III
Preceded by Mark R. Wise	Commanding General of the 3d Marine Aircraft Wing; 2018–2020	Succeeded by Christopher J. Mahoney
Preceded by Mark R. Wise	Assistant Deputy Commandant for Combat Development and Integration of the United States Marine Corps; 2020–2021	Succeeded by Mark H. Clingan
Preceded by Mark R. Wise	Deputy Commanding General of the Marine Corps Combat Development Command; 2020–2021	Succeeded by Mark H. Clingan
Preceded by Lewis A. Craparotta	Commanding General of the United States Marine Corps Training and Education Command; 2021–2024	Succeeded by Benjamin T. Watson
