= Attorney General Wise =

Attorney General Wise may refer to:

- Bernhard Wise (1858–1916), Attorney General of New South Wales
- Edward Wise (judge) (1818–1865), Attorney General of New South Wales

== See also ==
- General Wise (disambiguation)
