= Officer selection officer =

A Marine Corps Officer Selection Officer (OSO) leads a team of Marines and civilian employees in the recruitment of college students and graduates for a Commission as a 2nd Lieutenant in the United States Marine Corps.

== Responsibilities ==
An OSO is responsible for the oversight of all functions of the Officer Selection Team. It is their responsibility to ensure that all students who have the desire to be Marine Corps Officers are physically and mentally prepared for the rigors of the Officer Candidate School (OCS).

== Programs ==
The OSO has many different programs to offer to university students. All training is paid and takes place in Quantico, Virginia at the OCS. The programs are the Platoon Leaders Course (PLC) or the Officer Candidate Course (OCC).

The course enrollment is then further broken down into 3 different career choices:

- Air (Pilot or Naval Flight Officer)
- Law
- Ground

All training is paid and many universities accept OCS transcripts for college credit hours

Basic requirements for all programs:

- US citizenship (No dual citizenship)
- College grade point average of 2.0 or higher
- ACT score of 22 higher, or SAT score of 1000 or higher
- ASVAB score of 74 or higher
- Physically fit and able to pass a military medical exam
- Letters of Recommendation

== Officer Candidate Course ==
More commonly referred to as OCC, is reserved for recent grads, seniors anticipating graduation, or those that have been in the civilian work force for a period of time. OCC is an opportunity for college graduates to gain leadership skills and worldly experience while earning a salary.

Senior
A college senior is eligible to enroll in OCC with the intent to attend after graduation.

Graduates
A college grad is eligible to attend the OCC as soon as they desire. OCC classes are offered three times a year.

== Platoon Leaders Course ==
More commonly referred to as PLC, can be attended by sophomores, juniors and in some cases seniors.

Freshman and Sophomore
A freshman or sophomore attending the PLC would train during the summer immediately following selection as well as the summer before their senior year. Each training cycle is 6 weeks long and consists of leadership training, classroom instruction, land navigation, physical fitness, team building skills, decision making skills and general Marine Corps history and traditions. At the completion of each cycle the student would then be considered a Candidate. A Candidate is a student that has attended at least one evolution of training at OCS. At the completion of all required training and their senior year these candidates have the option of accepting their commission as a 2nd Lieutenant in the Marine Corps.

Junior
A junior attending the PLC would train during the summer before their senior year. This would be a 10-week course at OCS. The training would cover all the same as the (2) six week courses offered to freshmen and sophomores. At the completion the 10 weeks and their senior year these candidates have the option of accepting their commission as a 2nd Lieutenant in the Marine Corps.

Senior
In some cases seniors are eligible to attend the PLC. These seniors are those that will not graduate until December yet would like to do the training prior to graduation such as the case in OCC. These students will attend the 10-week course then return to finish school and be eligible for commission upon graduation.
