= United States Marine Corps Forces, South =

Marine element of United States Southern Command

U.S. Marine Corps Forces South
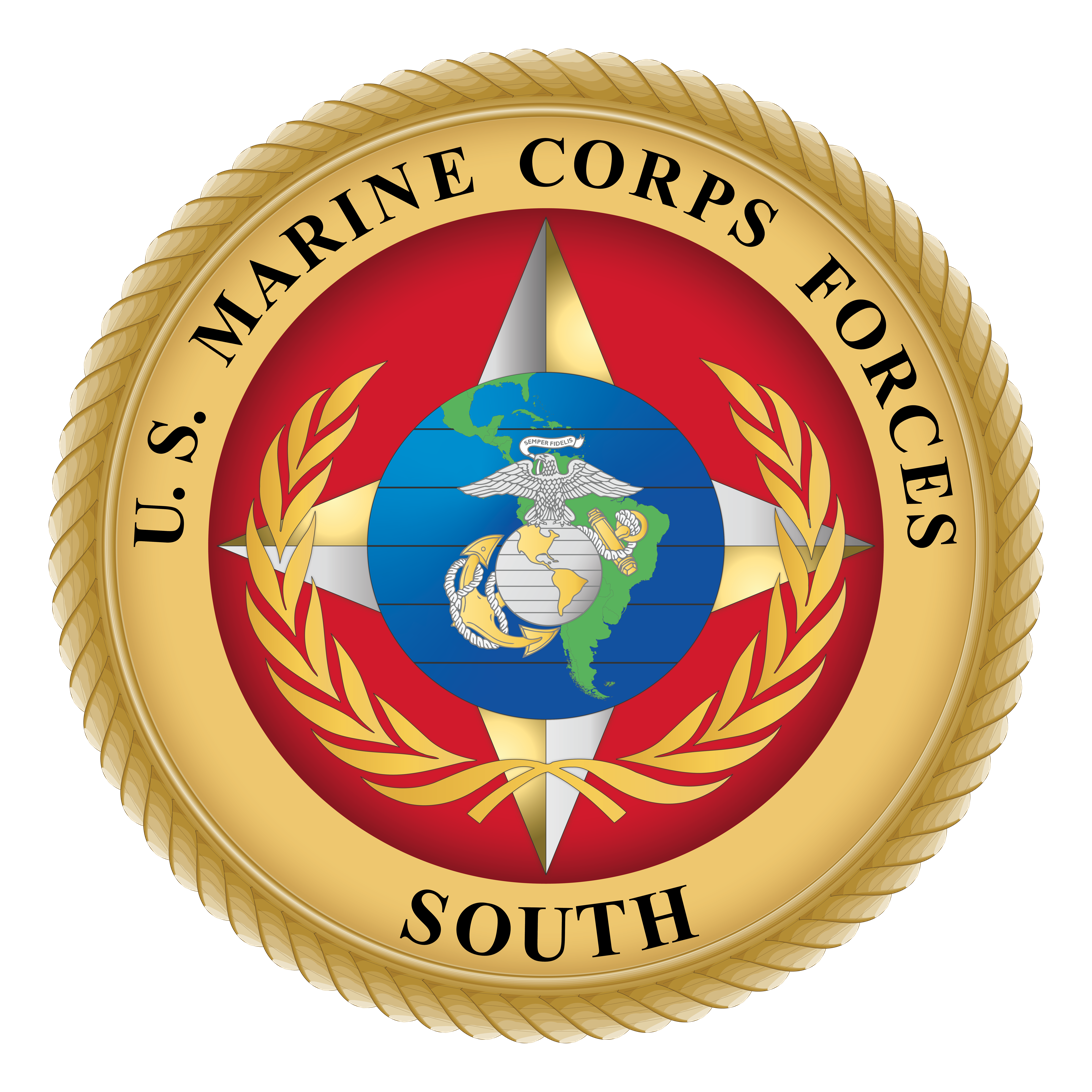
- Country: United States
- Branch: United States Marine Corps
- Part of: U.S. Southern Command
- Garrison/HQ: New Orleans, Louisiana
- Website: marforsouth.marines.mil

Commanders
- Commander: LtGen Len Anderson IV
- Deputy Commander: MajGen Douglas K. Clark
- Sergeant Major: SgtMaj Edwin A. Mota

The United States Marine Forces, South (abbreviated as MARFORSOUTH), headquartered in New Orleans, Louisiana, is the Marine Corps service component of the United States Southern Command. The commander of MARFORSOUTH is in charge of all Marine units assigned to Southern Command, advises the commander of Southern Command on the usage of Marines, and oversees the planning and implementation of Marine deployments in the region. Their main tasks include assisting marine and naval infantry forces in Latin America, humanitarian relief, peacekeeping, and counter-terrorism.

== History ==
The U.S. Marine Corps has a long history in Latin America and the Caribbean. The Raid of Nassau in March 1776 was the first amphibious operation by Continental Marines, taking place in the Bahamas during the American Revolutionary War. Between 1800 and the 1930s the majority of Marine deployments outside of the United States were in the Western Hemisphere, in support of the Monroe Doctrine. In the late 19th and early 20th centuries the Marine Corps participated in the Banana Wars in this region. The Small Wars Manual was written based on the experiences of Marines in those interventions.

In April 1885, during political tensions in Panama, Marines were sent by the United States Secretary of the Navy to protect American interests in the isthmus of Panama. One battalion was deployed initially, and was later joined by another two battalions, forming a provisional Marine brigade under the command of Major Charles Heywood, a future commandant of the Marine Corps. Marines landed in Cuba and Puerto Rico during the Spanish–American War, a conflict that began the expansion of the Corps from a small force used to provide security aboard naval ships to a larger fleet marine force capable of expeditionary warfare.

In November 1903 Marines were sent to Panama again to support the separation of Panama from Colombia, where the marine force included future commandant John A. Lejeune. Marines were deployed to Nicaragua in 1894 and 1910, with the latter involving Smedley Butler; to Haiti in 1915; and to the Dominican Republic in 1916. In Haiti, they provided support for an allied government, while in the Dominican Republic a U.S. military administration was established. In both countries Marines helped set up and served as officers in local security forces, including the Haitian Gendarmerie and the Dominican National Guard. Marines were withdrawn from these countries in the early 1930s, with the onset of the Great Depression and President Franklin Roosevelt's Good Neighbor policy.

== Organization ==
The current objectives of MARFORSOUTH include the training of Latin American marines and naval infantry, providing disaster relief, and counter-terrorism. In October 1999, Marine Corps Forces South headquarters was moved to Miami, Florida, and grew to be a fully fledged headquarters to assist the Commander of U.S. Southern Command with all Marine Corps activities in Latin America. From 1992 until 2007, the Commander of U.S. Marine Corps Forces Command (previously Marine Corps Forces, Atlantic) was also the Commander-designate of MARFORSOUTH. From 2007 to 2015, the position of Commander, Marine Forces South, was held by the Deputy Commander of Marine Corps Forces Command, based in Norfolk, Virginia. In July 2015, Brigadier General Eric Smith became the first dedicated commander of MARFORSOUTH at its Miami headquarters. His appointment occurred as the Marine Corps began increasing its activity in Latin America, with the focus of building partnerships with allies in the region, and during Marine General John F. Kelly's tenure as the head of Southern Command.

Since 2021, MARFORSOUTH has been supported by the United States Marine Corps Reserve (MARFORRES). As part of Force Design 2030, the Marine Reserve will be providing forces for Southern Command and all other theaters that are not part of the Indo-Pacific Command. Because of these changes, starting in 2021, MARFORSOUTH became a three-star command from the previous one-star, with Lieutenant General David Bellon being dual-hatted as the commanding general of both MARFORSOUTH and MARFORRES. Between 2014 and 2021 the Southern Command had a Special Purpose Marine Air-Ground Task Force assigned to it, until the Reserve took over that role. From 2014 to 2021, the Special Purpose Marine Air-Ground Task Force – Southern Command (SPMAGTF-SC) was stationed at Soto Cano Air Base in Honduras, from where it deployed Marines to participate in international training exercises and humanitarian relief missions across Latin America.

== List of commanders ==
#	Rank	Name	Term
Commander MARFORLANT / Commander MARFORSOUTH
1	Lieutenant General	William M. Keys	1991–1994
2	Lieutenant General	Robert B. Johnston	1994–1995
3	Lieutenant General	Charles E. Wilhelm	1995–1997
4	Lieutenant General	Peter Pace	1997–2000
5	Lieutenant General	Raymond P. Ayres	2000–2002
6	Lieutenant General	Martin R. Berndt	2002–2005
Commander MARFORCOM / Commander MARFORSOUTH
7	Lieutenant General	Robert R. Blackman Jr.	2005–2007
Deputy Commander MARFORCOM / Commander MARFORSOUTH
8	Brigadier General	John M. Croley	2007–2008
9	Brigadier General	Mark Bircher	2008–2009
10	Major General	Cornell A. Wilson Jr.	2009–2010
11	Major General	John M. Croley	2010–2012
12	Brigadier General	W. Blake Crowe	2012–2013
13	Brigadier General	David W. Coffman	2013–2015
Commander MARFORSOUTH
14	Brigadier General	Eric Smith	2015–2016
15	Brigadier General	Kevin Iiams	2016–2017
16	Major General	David Bellon	2017–2018
17	Major General	Michael F. Fahey	2018–2020
18	Brigadier General	Phillip N. Frietze	2020–2021
19	Lieutenant General	David Bellon	2021–2024
20	Lieutenant General	Len Anderson IV	2024–present
