= Edward Banta =

U.S. Marine Corps general

Edward D. Banta
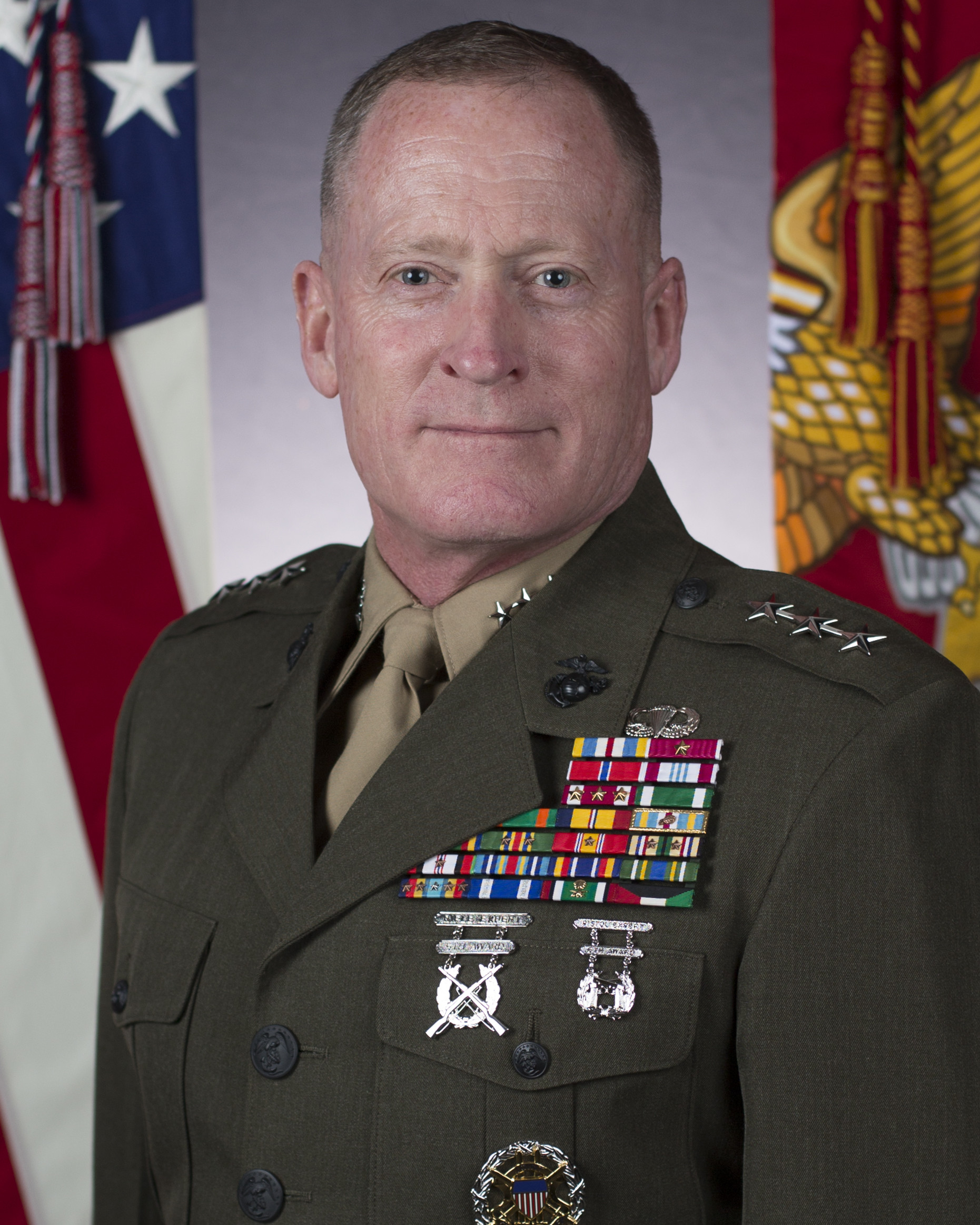
- Military career
- Allegiance: United States
- Branch: United States Marine Corps
- Service years: 1986–2024
- Rank: Lieutenant General
- Commands: Marine Corps Installations Command; Marine Corps Installations West; 2nd Marine Logistics Group

Edward D. Banta is a retired United States Marine Corps lieutenant general who last served as the deputy commandant for installations and logistics from 2021 to 2024. He previously served as the commander of the Marine Corps Installations Command. In April 2021, he was nominated for promotion to lieutenant general and assignment as deputy commandant for installations and logistics, replacing LtGen Charles Chiarotti.

Military offices
Preceded by ???	Commanding General of the 2nd Marine Logistics Group; 201?–2014	Succeeded by Charles Chiarotti
Preceded by John W. Bullard Jr.	Commanding General of Marine Corps Installations West; 2014–2016	Succeeded by Kevin J. Killea
Preceded by ???	Assistant Deputy Commandant for Programs of the United States Marine Corps; 201?–2019	Succeeded by Brian W. Cavanaugh
Preceded by Vincent A. Coglianese	Commander of the Marine Corps Installations Command and Assistant Deputy Commandant for Installations and Logistics of the United States Marine Corps; 2019–2021	Succeeded by Daniel B. Conley
Preceded by Charles Chiarotti	Deputy Commandant for Installations and Logistics; 2021–2024	Succeeded by Stephen Sklenka
