= Len Anderson IV =

U.S. Marine Corps general officer

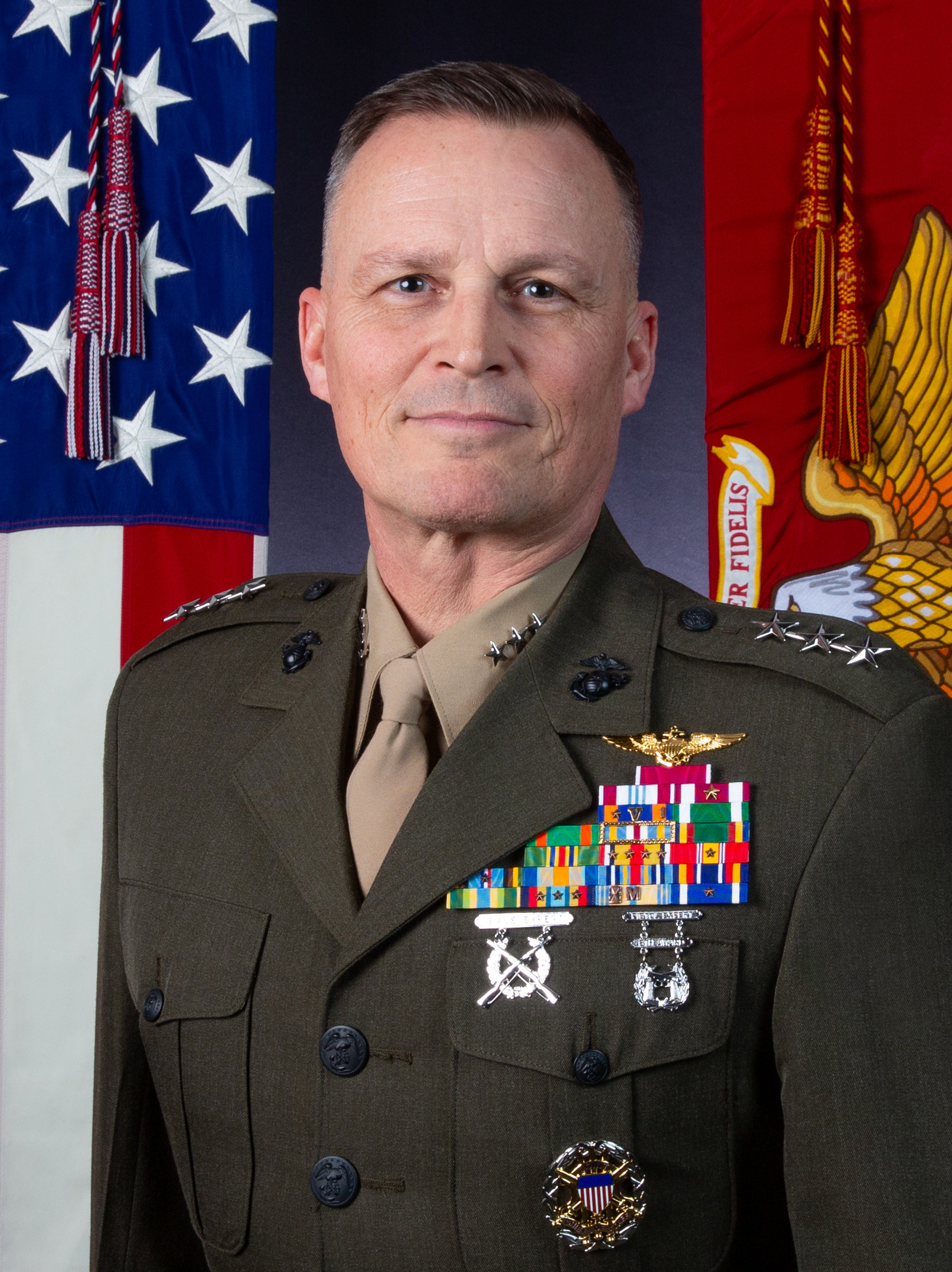
- Official portrait, 2024
- Born: c. 1971 (age 54–55); Duluth, Minnesota, U.S.
- Education: Illinois Institute of Technology; Air War College
- Military career
- Allegiance: United States
- Branch: United States Marine Corps; Marine Corps Reserve
- Service years: 1993–present
- Rank: Lieutenant General
- Commands: United States Marine Corps Reserve; United States Marine Corps Forces, South; 4th Marine Aircraft Wing; Marine Aviation Logistics Squadron 41
- Conflicts: Operation Southern Watch; Operation Desert Fox
- Awards: Legion of Merit

Leonard F. Anderson IV (born c. 1971) is a United States Marine Corps lieutenant general who serves as the commander of United States Marine Corps Reserve and United States Marine Corps Forces, South. He also served as the commanding general of the 4th Marine Aircraft Wing.

In April 2023, Anderson was nominated for promotion to lieutenant general and assignment as commander of the United States Marine Corps Reserve and United States Marine Corps Forces, South.

== Career ==
Anderson was commissioned in 1993 upon graduation from the Illinois Institute of Technology. He was designated a naval aviator in October 1995 and selected to fly the F/A-18 Hornet. Lieutenant General Anderson's previous assignments as a General Officer include Commanding General, 4th Marine Aircraft Wing, Deputy Commanding General, Marine Corps Forces Cyberspace Command and Deputy Commander, Joint Task Force-ARES. He attended the Top Gun school in January 2000

Assignments in the Operating Forces include: Schedules Officer, Assistant Operations Officer, Air Wing Landing Signal Officer, and Weapons and Tactics Instructor with the “Fabulous Checkerboards” of VMFA-312 while deployed on USS Enterprise and USS Truman during Operations SOUTHERN WATCH, DESERT FOX and DELIBERATE FORGE; and Training Officer, MAG-31. In 2006, he transferred to the Marine Forces Reserve where he has served as the Assistant Operations Officer, Marine Aviation Training Support Group 42; Operations Officer, VMFA-112; and Commanding Officer, MALS-41.

Assignments in the Supporting Establishment include: Demonstration Pilot, Navy Flight Demonstration Squadron; Flight Instructor, VT-86; Operations Officer, Marine Aviation Training Support Group-41. Headquarters and Staff Assignments: Senior Reserve Advisor, MAG-41; Reserve Branch Head, HQMC Aviation; Assistant Wing Commander, 4th Marine Aircraft Wing. Joint assignments include two deployments in support of Operation INHERENT RESOLVE as the Deputy Director, Combined Joint Operations Center-Baghdad, Iraq and Battle Director, 609th Combined Air Operations Center, Qatar.

Lieutenant General Anderson is a graduate of the Weapons and Tactics Instructor Course, the Navy Fighter Weapons School (TOPGUN), Command and Staff College (DEP), Air War College (DEP), Advanced Joint PME, Senior Joint Information Operations Application Course, Harvard Kennedy School's Cybersecurity: The Intersection of Policy and Technology, and the Combined Force Air Component Commander Course.

== Personal life ==
As a child, was a respected singing talent and performed a solo in an opera with Lucianno Pavarotti. His First professional acting job was a Public Service Announcement commercial emphasizing school bus safety at the age of 12.

Anderson was poised to become a marine biologist while acting at the community theatre. The release of Top Gun changed that plan and Later Joined The Marines.

Anderson Is A Member Of Pi Kappa Phi Fraternity.

Anderson Is a Coast Guard certified charter boat captain, and ran an offshore charter company for 3 years.

== Filmography ==
Military offices
Preceded by Timothy L. Adams	Commanding General of the 4th Marine Aircraft Wing; 2021–2023	Succeeded by John F. Kelliher III
New title	Assistant Deputy Commandant for Plans, Policies, and Operations; 2023–2024; Serving with: Michael S. Martin, William H. Swan	Vacant
Preceded by David Bellon	Commander of the United States Marine Corps Reserve and United States Marine Corps Forces, South; 2024–present	Incumbent
