= Stephen Sklenka =

U.S. Marine Corps general

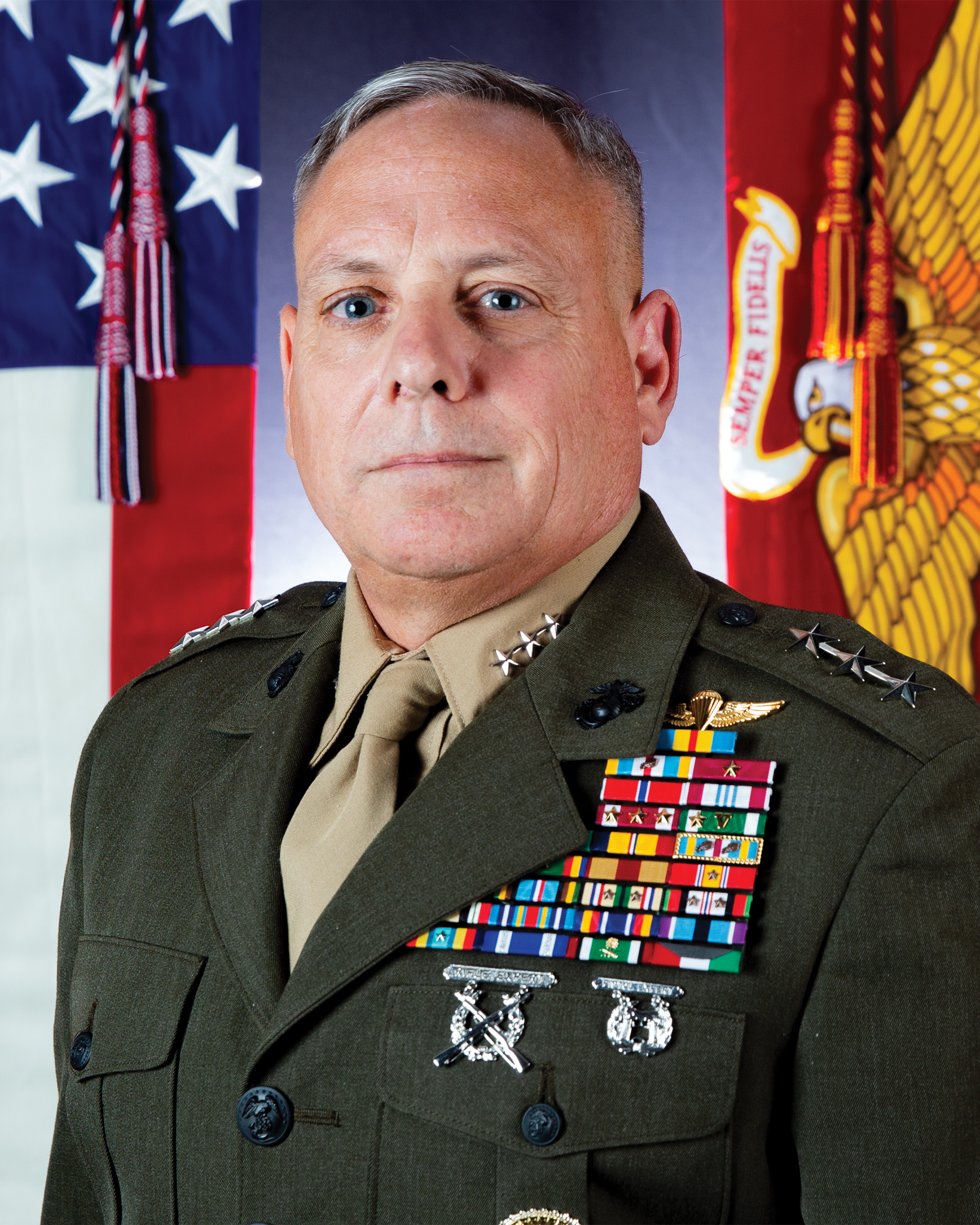
- Official portrait, 2024
- Military career
- Allegiance: United States
- Branch: United States Marine Corps
- Service years: 1988–2026
- Rank: Lieutenant General
- Commands: 1st Marine Logistics Group; Combat Logistics Regiment 15
- Conflicts: Gulf War; War in Afghanistan; Iraq War
- Awards: Defense Superior Service Medal; Legion of Merit (2); Bronze Star Medal

Stephen Douglas Sklenka is a retired United States Marine Corps lieutenant general who has served as the deputy commandant for installations and logistics of the United States Marine Corps from September 2024 to July 2026. He most recently served as the deputy commander of United States Indo-Pacific Command from 2021 to 2024. He previously served as the Director of Strategic Planning and Policy of the United States Indo-Pacific Command from 2019 to 2021. Previously, he was the Commanding General of the 1st Marine Logistics Group.

Sklenka is a 1988 graduate of the United States Naval Academy with a Bachelor of Science degree in history. He later earned a Master of Arts degree in national security and strategic studies from the Naval War College and a second Master of Arts degree in unconventional warfare/special operations low intensity conflict from the American Military University.

In June 2021, Sklenka was nominated for promotion to lieutenant general and assignment as deputy commander of the United States Indo-Pacific Command, succeeding Michael Minihan. In May 2024, he was nominated for assignment as deputy commandant for installation and logistics.

Military offices
Preceded by David Ottignon	Commander General of the 1st Marine Logistics Group; 2017–2019	Succeeded by Roberta L. Shea
Preceded by Michael Minihan	Deputy Commander of the United States Indo-Pacific Command; 2021–2024	Succeeded by Joshua Rudd
Preceded by Edward Banta	Deputy Commandant for Installations and Logistics; 2024–2026	Succeeded by Andrew M. Niebel
