= Lewis A. Craparotta =

United States Marine Corps general

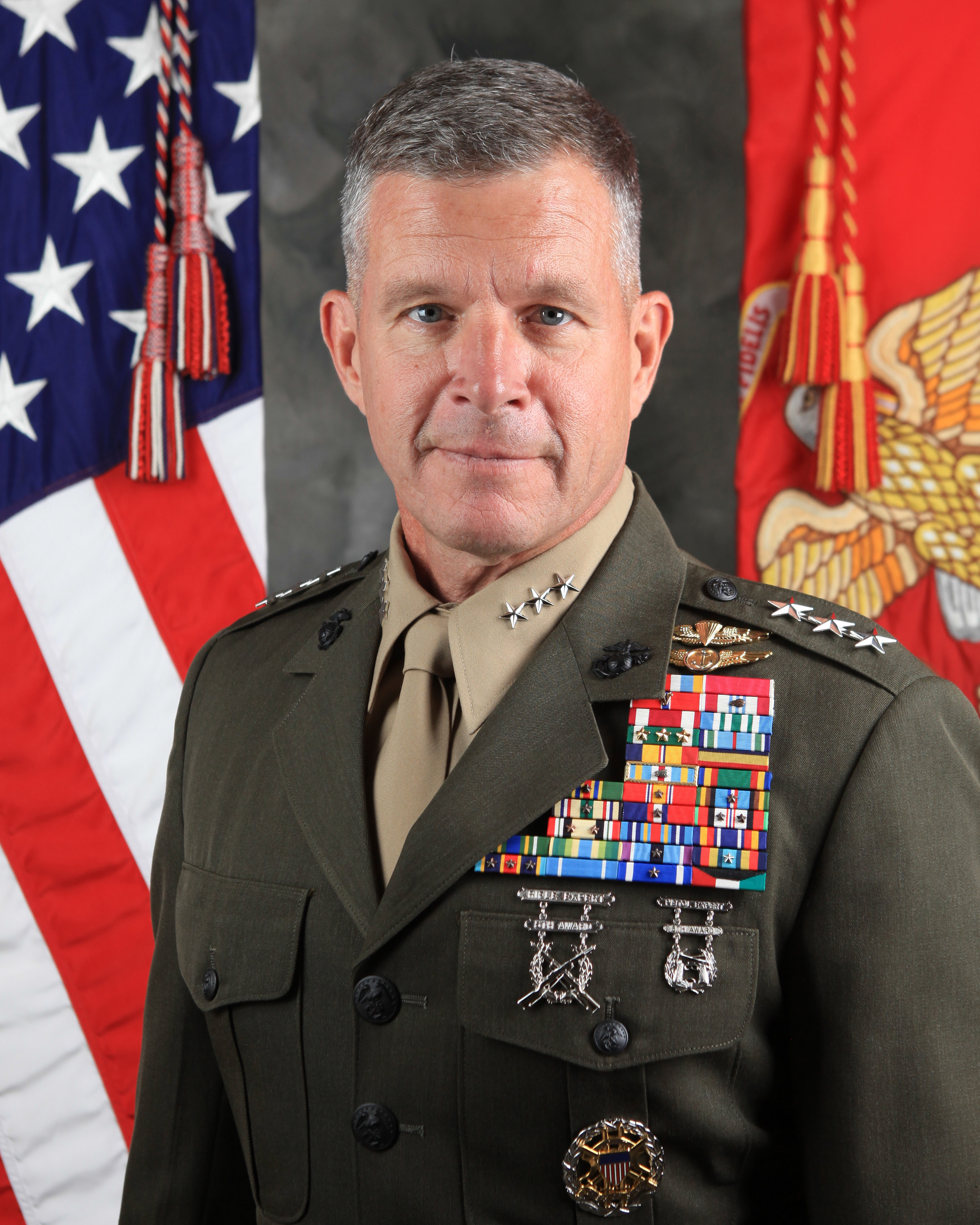
- Born: March 7, 1960 (age 66); South Windsor, Connecticut, U.S.
- Military career
- Allegiance: United States
- Branch: United States Marine Corps
- Service years: 1983–2021
- Rank: Lieutenant General
- Commands: Marine Corps Training and Education Command; Marine Corps Forces, Pacific; I Marine Expeditionary Force; Marine Corps Air Ground Combat Center Twentynine Palms; 2nd Marine Division (Forward); 1st Marine Regiment; 3rd Battalion, 1st Marines
- Conflicts: Gulf War; War in Afghanistan; Iraq War
- Awards: Defense Superior Service Medal; Legion of Merit; Bronze Star Medal

Lewis A. Craparotta (born March 7, 1960) is a retired United States Marine Corps lieutenant general who last served as the commanding general of United States Marine Corps Training and Education Command. Craparotta previously served as commanding general of Marine Corps Air Ground Combat Center Twentynine Palms.

== Marine career ==
Craparotta is an alumnus of the University of Vermont, and was commissioned in 1983. He is a 1978 graduate of South Windsor High School, and holds a master's degree in National Security and Strategic Studies from the Naval War College.

Craparotta took command of United States Marine Corps Forces, Pacific on August 8, 2018. Prior to that, he commanded the I Marine Expeditionary Force.

He relinquished command of TECOM to Kevin M. Iiams on August 2, 2021 and held his retirement ceremony immediately after.

== Awards and decorations ==

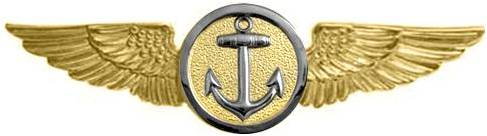

Navy and Marine Corps Parachutist Insignia
Naval Aviation Observer Badge
Defense Superior Service Medal		Legion of Merit	
Bronze Star Medal with Combat V	Defense Meritorious Service Medal with one bronze oak leaf cluster	Meritorious Service Medal	Joint Service Commendation Medal
Navy Commendation Medal with three gold award stars	Joint Service Achievement Medal	Combat Action Ribbon with award star	Navy Presidential Unit Citation
Joint Meritorious Unit Award with silver oak leaf cluster	Navy Unit Commendation	Navy Meritorious Unit Commendation with one bronze service star	National Defense Service Medal with service star
Armed Forces Expeditionary Medal with service star	Southwest Asia Service Medal with service star	Kosovo Campaign Medal with service star	Afghanistan Campaign Medal with two service stars
Iraq Campaign Medal with two service stars	Global War on Terrorism Expeditionary Medal	Global War on Terrorism Service Medal	Korea Defense Service Medal
Armed Forces Service Medal	Humanitarian Service Medal with service star	Sea Service Deployment Ribbon with one silver service star	Navy and Marine Corps Overseas Service Ribbon with three service stars
Order of the Rising Sun, 2nd Class (Gold and Silver Star)	United Nations Medal	NATO Medal for the former Yugoslavia with service star	Kuwait Liberation Medal (Kuwait)
Expert Rifle Badge (fifth award)		Expert Pistol Badge (fifth award)	
Joint Chiefs of Staff Identification Badge

Military offices
Preceded by David H. Berger	Commanding General of the I Marine Expeditionary Force; 2016–2018	Succeeded by Joseph Osterman
Preceded by David H. Berger	Commanding General of the United States Marine Corps Forces Pacific; 2018–2020	Succeeded by Steven R. Rudder
Preceded by William F. Mullen III	Commanding General of the United States Marine Corps Training and Education Command; 2020–2021	Succeeded by Kevin M. Iiams
