= United States Marine Corps Training and Education Command =

Major command of the U.S. Marine Corps

Marine Corps Training and Education Command
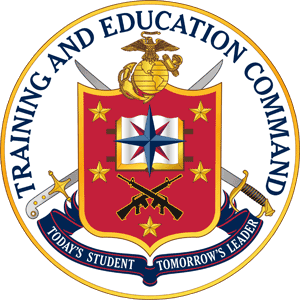
- Seal of the USMC Training and Education Command
- Founded: 1944 (as Marine Training and Replacement Command)
- Country: United States of America
- Branch: United States Marine Corps
- Type: Supporting command
- Role: Training and education
- Part of: Headquarters Marine Corps
- Garrison/HQ: MCB Quantico, Virginia, U.S.
- Mottos: "Always Learning, Always Leading!"
- Website: www.tecom.marines.mil

Commanders
- Current commander: LtGen Thomas B. Savage

The Marine Corps Training and Education Command (TECOM) is the primary training command of the United States Marine Corps.

TECOM leads the Marine Corps training and education continuum from individual entry-level training, professional military education and continuous professional development, through unit, collective, and service-level training in order to produce warfighters and enhance warfighting organizations that enable the Fleet Marine Force (FMF) to build and sustain the combat readiness required to fight and succeed, today and in the future.

== Organization ==
There are three major commands that fall under TECOM:

- Marine Air-Ground Task Force - Training Command (MAGTF-TC)
- Training Command
- Education Command

=== MAGTF-TC ===
Marine Air-Ground Task Force - Training Command (MAGTF-TC) conducts advanced individual and collective combined arms and maneuver training, manages the Commandant’s Service Level Training Program (SLTP) in order to enhance the combat readiness of the Marine Air Ground Task Force (MAGTF), and supports the Corp's responsibility to U.S. national security.

=== Training Command ===
The Training Command is responsible for the production of officer and enlisted entry-level Military Occupational Specialty, career progression, and career enhancement skills, with control over all formal training schools throughout the Marine Corps, including Officer Candidate School, The Basic School, Schools of Infantry and various other formal schools.

Some of the major units within Training Command are:

- Officer Candidates School
- The Basic School
- Marine Corps Communication Electronics School
- United States Marine Corps Schools of Infantry
  - Infantry Training Battalion (ITB)
  - Marine Combat Training Battalion (MCT)
  - Advanced Infantry Training Battalion (AITB)
- Marine Aviation Training Support Group 21
- Marine Aviation Training Support Group 22
- Marine Aviation Training Support Group 23
- Marine Corps Detachment, Fort Leonard Wood
- Marine Corps Artillery School, Fort Sill
  - The Marine Artillery Scout Observer Course (MASOC) is a forward observer training program intended to prepare United States Marines for the MOS #0861 (Fire Support Man).
- Marine Corps Communications School (formerly known as the Command-and-Control Systems School or CCSS)
- Marine Corps Intelligence Schools
  - Regional Intelligence Training Center-29 Palms
  - Regional Intelligence Training Center-East
  - Regional Intelligence Training Center-West
  - Marine Aviation Training Support Detachment Oceana, VA
  - Marine Detachment Dam Neck, VA
  - Marine Detachment Newport, RI
  - Security Cooperation Training Detachment,Fort Story, VI
  - Marine Detachment Naval School of Music
- Marine Corps Engineering School
- Marine Corps Combat Service Support Schools
  - Financial Management School
  - Ground Supply School
  - Logistics Operations School
  - Personnel Administration School
  - Marine Corps Water Survival School
  - Interservice Postal Training Activity School
- Field Medical Training Battalion - East
- Field Medical Training Battalion - West
- Weapons Training Battalion
- Assault Amphibian School

=== Education Command ===
The Education Command governs the training plans and policies that are instituted Corps-wide; This is the responsibility of the Policy & Standards Division (PSD) within HQ TECOM. This includes the Marine Corps Institute (MCI) courses and the Command and Staff College.

Some of the major units within Education Command are:

- Marine Corps University
  - Expeditionary Warfare School
  - Marine Corps War College
  - School of Advanced Warfighting
  - School of MAGTF Logistics
  - Marine Corps Command and Staff College
- Marine Corps Historical Division
- Junior Reserve Officers' Training Corps Marine Corps JROTC - MCJROTC is a special staff section under TECOM Headquarters – not part of EDCOM

=== Other elements ===
TECOM supervises several semi-autonomous commands and units that provide training and education to units in the Marine Corps:

==== MAGTF Training Command (MAGTF-TC) aboard Marine Corps Air Ground Combat Center, California ====
- Marine Aviation Weapons and Tactics Squadron One (MAWTS-1) — conducts training for aviation units, most notably the Weapons and Tactics Instructor (WTI) course at Marine Corps Air Station Yuma.
- Mountain Warfare Training Center — trains air and ground units for warfare in mountainous, high-altitude, and cold weather environments.
- The Tactical Training and Exercise Control Group (TTECG) — conducts several combined arms exercises a year called comprehensive, MAGTF-level Integrated Training Exercises (ITX)—formerly referred to as [Enhanced] Mojave Viper (EMV)—in support of Marine Corps units aboard MAGTFTC Twentynine Palms, California.
- Marine Corps Tactics and Operations Group (MCTOG) — conducts training for battle staff teams of battalions and regiments, most notably the Operations and Tactics Instructor (OTI) course, where students learn skills in operational management of battle staffs.

== List of commanders ==
- MajGen Charles F. B. Price, May 1944
- LtGen Holland Smith, October 1945
- LtGen Harry Schmidt, March 1946
- LtGen Walter E. Gaskin, March, 2000
- MajGen James W. Lukeman, ~2014
- MajGen Kevin M. Iiams, May 2017
- MajGen William F. Mullen III, 29 June 2018
- LtGen Lewis A. Craparotta, 3 August 2020
- LtGen Kevin M. Iiams, 2 August 2021
- LtGen Benjamin T. Watson, 9 August 2024

== See also ==
U.S. Armed Forces training and education commands

- Army Training and Doctrine Command
- Naval Education and Training Command
- Air Education and Training Command
- Space Training and Readiness Command
