= Charles Chiarotti =

U.S. Marine Corps general

Charles G. Chiarotti
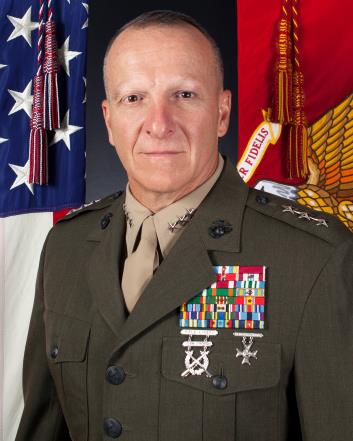
- Born: Italy
- Military career
- Allegiance: United States
- Branch: United States Marine Corps
- Service years: 1985–2021
- Rank: Lieutenant General
- Commands: 2nd Marine Logistics Group; Combat Logistics Regiment 3 MEU Service Support Group 22
- Conflicts: Iraq War
- Awards: Defense Superior Service Medal (2); Legion of Merit; Bronze Star Medal (2)

Charles G. Chiarotti is a retired United States Marine Corps Lieutenant General who last served as the Deputy Commandant for Installations and Logistics of the United States Marine Corps. Previously, he was the Deputy Commander of the United States Forces Japan.

Military offices
Preceded by ???	Director of Plans, Strategy and Programs of the United States Africa Command; 201?–2014	Succeeded by ???
Preceded by Edward Banta	Commanding General of the 2nd Marine Logistics Group; 2014–2016	Succeeded by David W. Maxwell
Preceded by Mark R. Wise	Deputy Commander of the United States Forces Japan; 2016–2018	Succeeded by Christopher J. Mahoney
Preceded by Michael G. Dana	Deputy Commandant for Installations and Logistics of the United States Marine Corps; 2018–2021	Succeeded by Edward D. Banta
