= William F. Mullen III =

United States Marine Corps general (1964–2024)

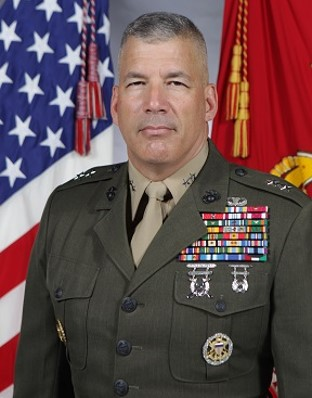
- Born: July 15, 1964
- Died: June 29, 2024 (aged 59); Twentynine Palms Combat Center, California, U.S.
- Military career
- Allegiance: United States
- Branch: United States Marine Corps
- Service years: 1986–2020
- Rank: Major General
- Commands: Training and Education Command; Marine Corps Air Ground Combat Center Twentynine Palms; Marine Corps University; Marine Corps Tactics and Operations Group; 2nd Battalion, 6th Marines
- Conflicts: Gulf War; Iraq War
- Awards: Defense Superior Service Medal; Legion of Merit; Bronze Star Medal

Major General William Francis Mullen III (15 July 1964 – June 29, 2024) was an officer in the United States Marine Corps. He last served as the commanding general for Training and Education Command. He was deployed in Fallujah, Iraq, in 2007 during Operation Iraqi Freedom. He co-wrote a book with Daniel Green called Fallujah Redux: The Anbar Awakening and the Struggle with Al-Qaeda.

== Education ==
Mullen earned both bachelor's and master's degrees in political science from Marquette University. He also earned a master's degree in national security and strategic studies from the Naval War College.

== Military career ==
While attending Marquette University, Mullen was commissioned in 1986 through the Naval Reserve Officers Training Corps program. From 1987 to 1990, he served as a Platoon Commander and Training Officer for the 1st Battalion, 3rd Marines in Kaneohe, Hawaii. He was then transferred to the Marine Corps Security Force Battalion at Mare Island, California, where he served as a platoon commander, executive officer, and Commanding Officer of the Fleet Anti-Terrorism Security Team Company.

During this time, Mullen was deployed for Operation Desert Shield, and was also involved in counter-narcotics missions with Joint Task Force 6 (now known as Joint Task Force North). Following his tour at Mare Island in 1993, he attended the Advanced Artillery Officer Course at Fort Sill, Oklahoma. He then served as Commanding Officer of Fox Company, 2nd Battalion, 6th Marines. In 1994, he took part in Operation Sea Signal, the U.S. military's humanitarian mission in the Caribbean. From 1995 to 1996, he served in the 26th Marine Expeditionary Unit and in the 2nd Battalion 24th Marines in Milwaukee, Wisconsin. He later led a counter-narcotics mission in the Los Padres National Forest in California.

Mullen was the Marine aide to President Bill Clinton from 1999 to 2001. He then attended the School of Advanced Warfighting in 2001. By 2004, he served as executive assistant to the deputy director for Regional Operations, and then as Divisions Plans Officer in the 2nd Marine Division in Camp Lejeune, North Carolina.

In 2005, Mullen was deployed to Fallujah, Iraq, as Operations Officer for the Regimental Combat Team 8, 2nd Marine Division. In 2007, he commanded 2nd Battalion, 6th Marines in Fallujah. After his tour ended, he attended the Naval War College in Newport, Rhode Island earning a master's degree. In 2009, he commanded the Marine Corps Tactics and Operations Group in Twentynine Palms, California.

In July 2012, he was assigned as the Commanding General, Education Command, and President of Marine Corps University. On October 12, 2012, Mullen was promoted to brigadier general. Mullen served as Director, Capabilities Development Directorate, Marine Corps Combat Development Command in Quantico, Virginia.

In July 2016, he assumed command of Marine Corps Air Ground Combat Center Twentynine Palms. That same year, he was also redeployed in support of Operation Inherent Resolve.. In July 2017, he was promoted to Major General.

In June 2018, Mullen assumed command of Training and Education Command. On August 3, 2020, he was succeeded by Lewis A. Craparotta.

== Author ==
Mullen co-wrote a book with Daniel Green entitled Fallujah Redux: The Anbar Awakening and the Struggle with Al-Qaeda, published in September 2014. The book details the U.S. military's conflict with the Iraqi insurgency in Al-Anbar province, specifically the city of Fallujah during Operation Iraqi Freedom. The authors describe how U.S. forces captured Fallujah in 2003 but the city was then taken by insurgent groups such as Al-Qaeda, which required the U.S. military to retake the city in 2004. The authors present a strategy by U.S. military planners to work with the local population in order to resist the insurgents, who were seen as a common enemy.

== Death ==
On June 29, 2024, Mullen's body was found at Marine Corps Air Ground Combat Center Twentynine Palms, California, the base he formerly commanded. He was 59.
