= United States Marine Corps Reserve =

Reserve force of the U.S. Marine Corps

U.S. Marine Corps Forces Reserve
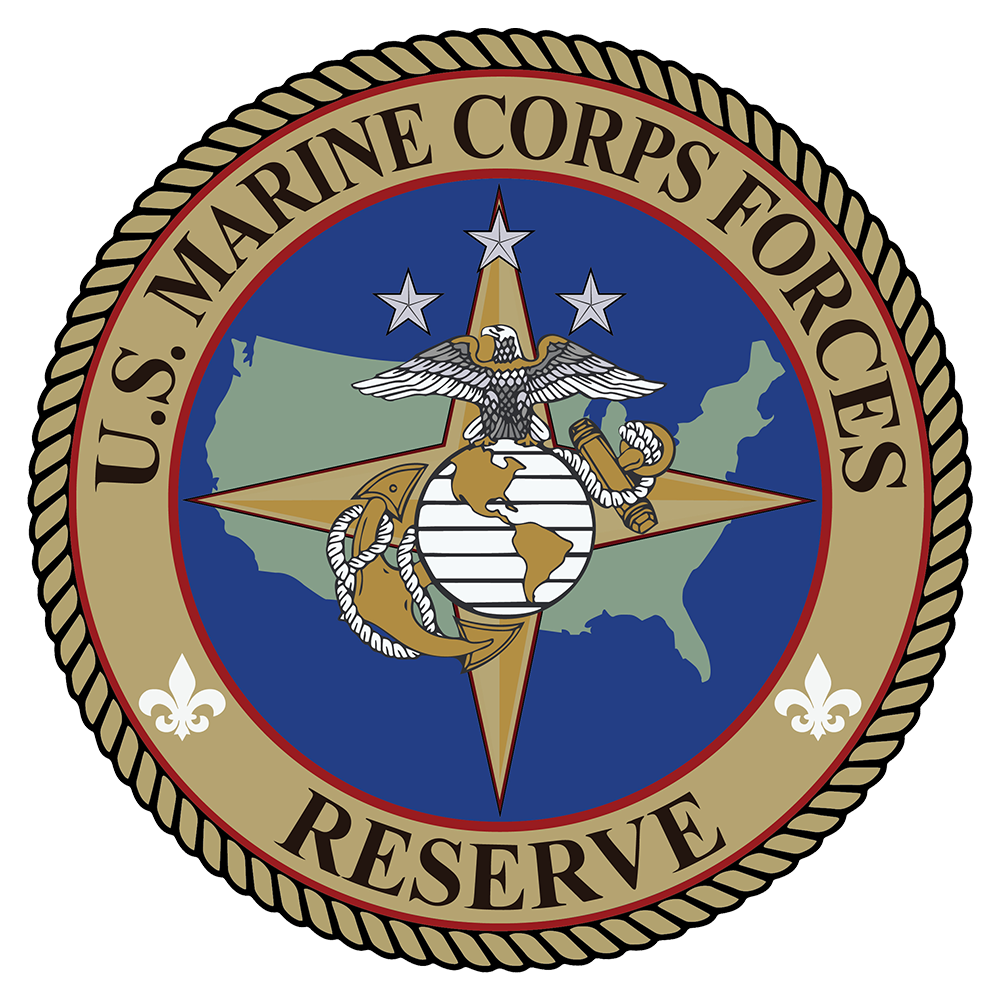
- U.S. Marine Corps Forces Reserve Emblem
- Founded: 29 August 1916; 109 years ago
- Country: United States
- Branch: United States Marine Corps
- Size: 35,501 reserve personnel (as of 2020)
- Part of: U.S. Department of the Navy; Reserve components of the United States Armed Forces
- Garrison/HQ: Marine Corps Support Facility New Orleans; New Orleans, Louisiana
- Mottos: Ready, Relevant, Responsive
- Engagements: World War I; World War II; Korean War; Operation Desert Storm; Operation Enduring Freedom; Operation Iraqi Freedom
- Website: marforres.marines.mil

Commanders
- Commander: LtGen Len Anderson IV

The Marine Forces Reserve (MARFORRES or MFR), also known as the United States Marine Corps Reserve (USMCR) and the U.S. Marine Corps Forces Reserve, is the reserve force of the United States Marine Corps. The Marine Corps Reserve is an expeditionary, warfighting organization and primarily designed to augment and reinforce the active duty units of the Marine Corps in their expeditionary role. It is the largest command, by assigned personnel, in the U.S. Marine Corps.

Marines in the Reserve go through the same training and work in the same Military Occupational Specialties (MOS) as their active-duty counterparts. The United States Marine Corps Reserve was established when Congress passed the Naval Appropriations Act of 29 August 1916, and is responsible for providing trained units and qualified individuals to be mobilized for active duty in time of war, national emergency, or contingency operations.

== Role ==
Marine Forces Reserve is the headquarters command for approximately 40,000 drilling Selected Reserve Marines and 184 Reserve Training Centers located throughout the United States. The mission of Marine Forces Reserve is to augment and reinforce active Marine forces in time of war, national emergency, or contingency operations; to provide personnel and operational tempo relief for the active forces in peacetime; and to provide service to the community (for example, through Toys for Tots).

MARFORRES is composed primarily of two groups of Marines and Sailors. The first, known as the Selected Marine Corps Reserve (SMCR), are Marines who typically belong to reserve units and have a minimum obligation to drill one weekend a month and two weeks a year. The second group is known as the Individual Ready Reserve (IRR). The IRR is composed of Marines who have finished their active duty or USMCR obligations, however, their names remain on record to be called up in case of a war or other emergency – the Individual Ready Reserve is administered by the Marine Corps Individual Reserve Support Activity. IRR Marines participate in annual musters to check in with the Corps.

While MFR units have US Navy Sailors assigned to perform medical and religious program specialty services, those Sailors are not members of the Marine Corps Reserve. Instead, they are a mix of US Navy Reserve and US Navy Regular Sailors detailed by the Navy to serve alongside Marines.

In addition, through the MCIRSA, MFR administers a small number of reserve Marines assigned to either the Active Status List or Inactive Status List of the Standby Reserve, a category reserved for those Marines who remain members of the USMCR but are either retained involuntarily for various reasons, or unable to participate in SMCR activities.

== Organization ==
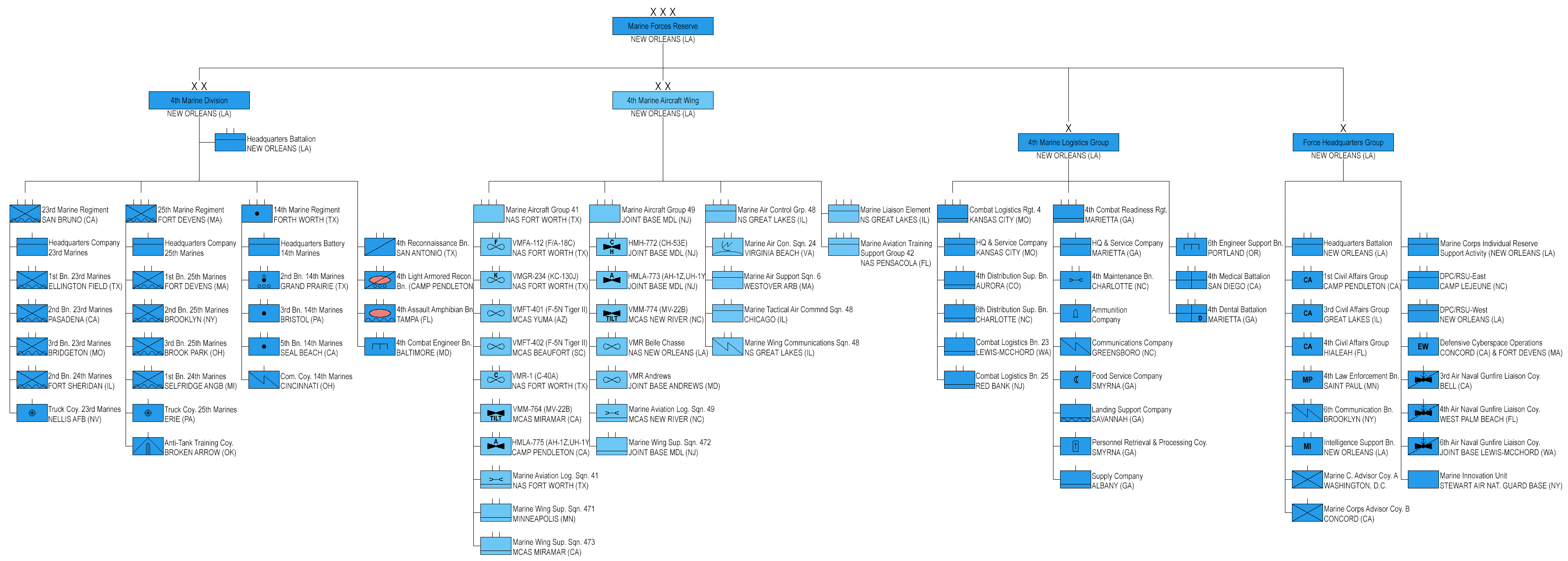
Marine Forces Reserve organization as of May 2026 (click to enlarge)

=== Units ===
- Ground combat element: 4th Marine Division
- Aviation combat element: 4th Marine Aircraft Wing
- Logistics combat element: 4th Marine Logistics Group
- Force Headquarters Group
- Marine Forces Reserve Band

Reserve units utilize infrastructure when mobilized through Reserve Support Units (RSU) located at various bases throughout the U.S. (such as Lejeune, Pendleton, Miramar, Quantico, and Twentynine Palms).

== Enlistment ==
Enlistment in the Marine Forces Reserve occurs through a process similar to that for enlistment in the regular active Marine Corps. Recruits must take the ASVAB, pass a comprehensive physical exam, and be sworn in. They may enter through a billet in the Delayed Entry Program (DEP). Reserve recruits attend recruit training along with active duty recruits, earning the title United States Marine upon successful completion of the training. They then have a mandatory leave of 10 days (up to 24 if they volunteer for and are assigned to recruiter's assistance, although, reservists are not usually given RA) before further training at the School of Infantry (SOI) and their designated Military Occupational Specialty (MOS). Only after completing the training program(s) does a Reserve Marine's enlistment begin to differ from that of an active-duty Marine.

There is a program called the Select Reserve Incentive Program (SRIP), which provides enlistment bonuses for Reservists enlisting for needed MOSs. Half is payable upon completion of training and the other half is spread out over the term of enlistment.

== Commission ==
For those who have earned a college degree, the Reserve Officer Commissioning Program (ROCP) provides a path directly into the Marine Corps Reserve leading to a commission as an officer of Marines. Upon selection from a regional Officer Selection Office (OSO), applicants attend Officer Candidates School (OCS) at Quantico, Virginia. Upon successful completion of OCS (the 10-week OCC-R course), candidates are commissioned as a Second Lieutenant and subsequently attend the Basic Officer Course at The Basic School (TBS), Quantico, Virginia. Following graduation of TBS and follow-on MOS training, officers either report to their reserve unit, or have the option to complete a one-year experience tour with an active duty unit.

== Service ==
Reservists, like all new service members, contract for eight-year terms. There are three options on how these terms may be served, one of which is designated upon signing.

- 6x2 – Under this option the reservist spends 6 years drilling with an SMCR unit and fulfills the remaining two in the Individual Ready Reserve (IRR). This is the only option which makes Reservists eligible for the benefits of the Montgomery GI Bill unless they complete periods of active duty, and is also the most common.
- 5x3 – Under this option the reservist spends 5 years drilling with an SMCR unit and fulfills the remaining three in the Individual Ready Reserve (IRR).
- 4x4 – Under this option the Reservist spends 4 years drilling with an SMCR unit and fulfills the remaining four in the Individual Ready Reserve (IRR). The 4x4 option is popular among officers.

After serving several years in the Reserves and attaining leadership rank it is possible for an enlisted Reservist to receive a commission through the Reserve Enlisted Commissioning Program (RECP). Marines who have previously served on active duty, whether officer or enlisted, can join the Select Marine Corps Reserve directly. Veteran Marines wishing to do this go through a Marine Corps Prior Service Recruiter. The mission of the Prior Service Recruiter is to join members from the Individual Ready Reserve to SMCR units close to their home.

Marine reservists are allowed to serve simultaneously in the United States Marine Corps Reserve and in the naval militia of their state of residence; however, when called into federal service, reservists are relieved from service and duty in the naval militia until released from active duty.

== See also ==
Comparable organizations

- Army National Guard (U.S. Army)
- United States Army Reserve
- United States Navy Reserve
- United States Coast Guard Reserve
- Air National Guard (U.S. Air Force)
- Air Force Reserve Command (U.S. Air Force)
