= Officer Candidates School (United States Marine Corps) =

US Marines officer commissioning program based at MCB Quantico

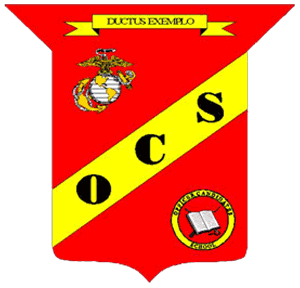
- The OCS insignia
- Active: 1891 – present
- Country: United States
- Branch: United States Marine Corps
- Type: Training
- Role: Screen and evaluate officer candidates
- Part of: Training and Education Command
- Garrison/HQ: Marine Corps Base Quantico
- Mottos: "Ductus Exemplo" "Leadership by Example"

Commanders
- Current commander: Colonel Madeline M. Melendez

The United States Marine Corps Officer Candidates School (OCS) is a training regiment designed to screen and evaluate potential Marine Corps officers at Marine Corps Base Quantico in Virginia. Those who successfully complete the period of instruction are commissioned as second lieutenants.

Most Marine Corps officers earn their commissions through OCS, though others are midshipmen from the United States Naval Academy, limited duty officers and warrant officers, and inter-service transfers. This differs from the other United States military services, who commission the majority of their officers through the Reserve Officers’ Training Corps (ROTC) programs at various colleges.

Officer candidates go through a 10-week Officer Candidates Course (OCC) or Platoon Leaders Class (PLC), or two 6-week PLC courses over separate summers, designed primarily to screen and evaluate candidates' physical and mental capabilities to lead Marines by placing them in leadership positions and physically and mentally demanding environments. The second 6-week course only happens after a candidate's junior year of college. The OCC 10-week course is available to those seeking a commission who meet the requirements to become an officer to include already possessing a bachelor's degree. Students are evaluated during two- to three-day garrison command billets at the company, platoon, and squad level, and fire-team level tactical billets during field exercises and situational leadership events.

== History ==
Before World War I, Marine officers came primarily from the Naval Academy or were commissioned from the enlisted ranks. But as the Marine Corps expanded, it needed its own training pipeline for officers. OCS traces its roots to the "School of Application," established in 1891 in Washington, D.C. With the expansion of the Marine Corps for World War I, all instructional efforts were consolidated—first at Marine Corps Station, Philadelphia, then in 1940 at Marine Corps Base Quantico. PLC Juniors was at Camp Upshur through 1987 but was subsequently consolidated with PLC Seniors at Brown Field, where they remain today.

== Selection and entry ==
There are several ways to gain entry to Officer Candidates School:

- Officer Candidates Course (OCC) for college seniors and graduates
- Platoon Leaders Class (PLC) for college students with one or more years left in school
- NROTC (Marine Option). In addition to regular NROTC program requirements, NROTC (Marine Option) midshipmen must pass a 6-week OCS course known as "Bulldog" during summer between junior and senior year. "Bulldog" is modeled after the PLC Seniors Course.
- Enlisted Commissioning Program (ECP) for enlisted Marines with a college degree
- Meritorious Commissioning Program (MCP) for enlisted Marines within 18 months of graduation (No longer an active commissioning program)
- Marine Enlisted Commissioning Education Program (MECEP)

Officer Candidates must pass a series of tests before being admitted into the Officer Candidate School. An Officer Selection Officer (OSO), usually a Captain, meets with a prospective Officer Candidate. Upon completing a satisfactory interview, the OSO then makes the decision to move the prospective candidate onto the next step. The prospective candidate then must complete a short essay about why they want to be a Marine Officer, provide identification (usually a birth certificate and Social Security card), pass a background check, provide five letters of recommendation, and complete a physical medical exam.

After successful completion of these steps, the OSO may then conduct the Officer Candidate through a Physical Fitness Test. Upon reaching a score on the test that the OSO deems to be acceptable (a minimum first class score is necessary), the Officer Candidate then signs the contract (including the contract to attend the course, the fraternization policy acknowledgement, and the Marine Corps drug policy acknowledgement). Candidates choose to enter the program as either a ground, air, cyber, or law contract.

All of this information is sent to a review board, which will vote to decide if the Candidate should be accepted to Officer Candidate School. These review boards generally convene only once a month. After receiving a majority vote of acceptance from the review board, the Officer Candidate is officially accepted into the Officer Candidate Program and scheduled for a class.

== Training ==
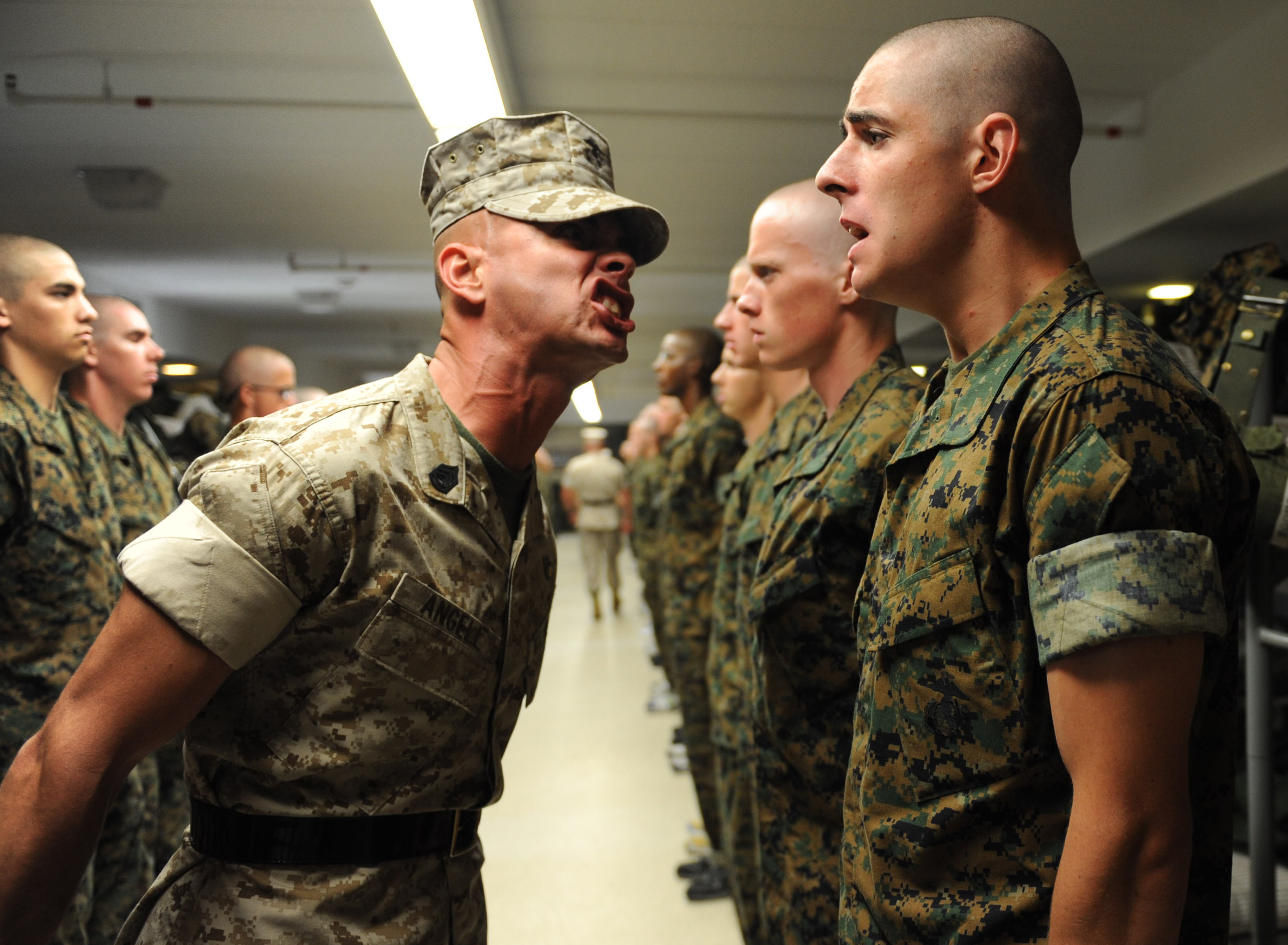
A Sergeant Instructor corrects an officer candidate

OCS screens potential officers using a program designed to test and assess the candidates by using the three graded categories of Academics, Leadership, and Physical Fitness. This includes evaluated events such as the leadership reaction course (LRC) and small unit leader evaluation (SULE). The Period of Instruction (POI) is divided into must pass events, such as hikes and the Endurance Course, and purely graded events that factor into one of the three graded categories, such as LRC and SULE. Candidates must maintain a minimum of 80% in Academics, Leadership, and Physical Fitness to graduate, as well as passing all the mandatory pass/fail events such as the Endurance Course. Events that must be passed for graduation are also given percentage grades that factor into one of the three graded categories.

Regardless of course, the instructors usually include officers to handle most academic instruction, enlisted sergeant instructors (Staff Noncommissioned Officers taken from the drill instructor community) to conduct most of the day-to-day management, and other instructors (most often non-commissioned officers) to teach most field skills. Officer Candidates on both courses have many related expenses (including travel to and from Officer Candidate School, meals, and lodging) paid for them (after the conclusion of training), and have expenses for uniforms, books, and other supplies deducted from their pay. The Training and Education Command designs the program of instruction for OCS.

=== Platoon Leaders Class ===
The Platoon Leaders Class normally consists of two six-week training sessions taken between consecutive school years, which occur in the summers with no commitment during the school year. Young men and women at any accredited four-year college or university are eligible for this class.

Officer Candidates who attend the Platoon Leaders Class may opt for either the PLC Juniors/Seniors program or the PLC Combined program. In the Juniors/Seniors program, a freshman may attend the PLC Juniors course the summer between their freshman and sophomore years, then attend the PLC Seniors course the summer before their senior year begins. Sophomores can attend the PLC Juniors course the summer before their junior year in school and the PLC Seniors course the following summer. PLC Combined is a ten-week program for those interested in completing officer screening during a single summer after completing their junior year in college.

Training includes academic and field topics. Academic subjects covered include Marine Corps history, leadership, close order drill, weapons handling, and general military subjects such as land navigation, the Uniform Code of Military Justice, interior guard, moral and ethical leadership, and basic combat. PLC candidates need to be physically fit as the physical training is demanding; for example, Officer Candidates in the PLC Seniors course run and hike an average of 250 miles (400 km) or more during a six-week period.

Those who opt for the Juniors/Seniors program will find that the divided program is tailored to provide progressive training. The Juniors course is an introduction into the Marine Corps, and allows the candidates to be evaluated and motivated for a possible commission. Physical training, small unit leadership, and basic infantry tactics are addressed, as well as significant academic instruction. PLC Seniors is an advanced course of indoctrination and contains similar physical training, small unit leadership, infantry tactics, and academics; but at a faster rate and with more instructor-induced stress. Those candidates who opt for the combined course cover the same areas of instruction, but it is integrated without the need to reevaluate candidates due to a year-long gap. NROTC midshipmen attend the PLC Seniors course for their final summer cruise, nicknamed "Bulldog".

=== Officer Candidates Course ===
The main alternative is the Officer Candidates Course, which is designed for college seniors or graduates and enlisted Marines, and consists of one ten-week training session. While the curriculum is identical to the 10-week PLC Combined session, OCC is held three times a year (winter, summer, and fall), and accepts only college graduates. Additionally, graduates of OCC are commissioned immediately upon graduation of OCS.

=== The Quigley ===
The Quigley is a legendary water obstacle that is currently part of the Combat Course at OCS. Lieutenant Colonel William J. Quigley, a veteran of both the Korean and Vietnam Wars, designed it in 1967. It consists of a long canal with 4-foot (1.2 m) cement culverts submerged in swampy water; candidates must immerse themselves and navigate through the Quigley without standing as a part of the OCS training program. The Quigley, as well as the Combat Course of which it is a part, however, is not a graded exercise and is not necessary for graduation.

=== USNA Leatherneck ===
Midshipmen First Class at the United States Naval Academy who express interest in joining the Marine Corps attend a four-week summer program in Quantico called Leatherneck after the slang term for Marines. They are evaluated on leadership, physical training and military skills, with physical evaluations including the Physical Fitness Test, Combat Fitness Test, Obstacle Course and Endurance Course. Midshipmen also learn basic military skills such as land navigation, combat orders, offensive combat tactics, and basic weapons familiarization, which are applied during multi-day field exercises including the culminating event when each midshipman is given the opportunity to lead a squad attack on an objective.

== Further training ==
Officer candidates who complete OCS (and have obtained their college degrees) are then commissioned as Second Lieutenants and sent to The Basic School (TBS) at Quantico for six months of further training with other newly commissioned Marine officers from all other commissioning programs. At TBS, they receive the skills and knowledge necessary to lead Marines in combat; much like "every Marine is a rifleman", every officer is introduced to the skills necessary to lead a provisional rifle platoon.

== See also ==
- Officer Candidate School (United States Army)
- Officer Candidate School (United States Navy)
- Air Force Officer Training School
