= Mark R. Wise =

U.S. Marine Corps general

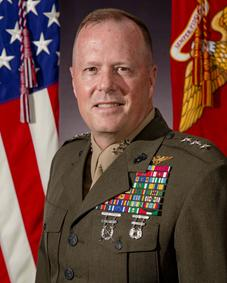
- Military career
- Allegiance: United States
- Branch: United States Marine Corps
- Service years: 1986–2022
- Rank: Lieutenant General
- Commands: 3rd Marine Aircraft Wing; United States Marine Corps Warfighting Laboratory; Marine Aircraft Group 12; VMFA-122
- Conflicts: Gulf War; War in Afghanistan
- Awards: Defense Superior Service Medal; Legion of Merit; Bronze Star Medal

Mark R. Wise is a retired United States Marine Corps lieutenant general who last served as the Deputy Commandant for Aviation of the United States Marine Corps. Previously, he was the Assistant Deputy Commandant for Combat Development and Integration of the United States Marine Corps and Deputy Commanding General of the Marine Corps Combat Development Command.

Military offices
Preceded by ???	Deputy Commander of the United States Forces Japan; 2014–2016	Succeeded by Charles Chiarotti
Preceded by Michael A. Rocco	Commanding of the 3rd Marine Aircraft Wing; 2016–2018	Succeeded by Kevin Iiams
Preceded by Niel E. Nelson	Assistant Deputy Commandant for Combat Development and Integration of the United States Marine Corps; 2018–2020	Succeeded by Kevin Iiams
Preceded by Niel E. Nelson	Deputy Commanding General of the Marine Corps Combat Development Command; 2018–2020	Succeeded by Kevin Iiams
Preceded by Steven R. Rudder	Deputy Commandant for Aviation of the United States Marine Corps; 2020–2022	Succeeded by Michael S. Cederholm
