= 48 Squadron =

48 Squadron or 48th Squadron may refer to:

- No. 48 Squadron (Finland)
- No. 48 Squadron IAF, India
- No. 48 Squadron RAF, United Kingdom
- 48th Fighter Squadron (Romania)

== United States ==
- 48th Airlift Squadron
- 48th Bombardment Squadron
- 48th Intelligence Squadron
- 48th Flying Training Squadron
- 48th Rescue Squadron
- 48th Air Transport Squadron
- Marine Tactical Air Command Squadron 48
- Marine Wing Communications Squadron 48
- VP-48
- VP-48 (1946-91)
