= List of active duty United States Marine Corps major generals =

List of US Marine Corps major generals

U.S. Marine major general insignia

U.S. Marine Corps rank insignia of a major general

The rank flag of a major general in the United States Marine Corps

This is a list of active duty United States Marine Corps major generals collected from publicly available and accessible information.

== List of two-star positions ==
=== Department of Defense ===
Position insignia	Position	Part of	Photo	Incumbent	Service branch
Joint Staff
Joint Staff	Vice Director for Logistics (J-4), Joint Staff	Office of the Joint Staff		Major General; Phillip N. Frietze	U.S. Marine Corps
Unified combatant commands
U.S. Africa Command	Chief of Staff, U.S. Africa Command (USAFRICOM)	Not applicable		Major General; Matthew G. Trollinger	U.S. Marine Corps
U.S. Central Command	Director of Logistics and Engineering (J-4), U.S. Central Command (USCENTCOM)	Not applicable		Major General; Adam L. Chalkley	U.S. Marine Corps
U.S. Southern Command	Director of Strategy, Policy and Plans (J-5), U.S. Southern Command (USSOUTHCOM)	Not applicable		Major General; Stephen J. Lightfoot	U.S. Marine Corps
U.S. Space Command	Mobilization Assistant to the Deputy Commander, U.S. Space Command (USSPACECOM)	Not applicable		Major General; Sean N. Day	U.S. Marine Corps
Other joint positions
United Nations Command ROK/U.S. Combined Forces Command U.S. Forces Korea	Korea; Director of Plans, Policy and Strategy (U-5), United Nations Command (UNC), Director of Plans, Policy and Strategy (C-5) ROK/U.S. Combined Forces Command (CFC) and Director of Plans, Policy and Strategy (J-5), U.S. Forces Korea (USFK)	U.S. Indo-Pacific Command (USINDOPACOM)		Major General; Anthony M. Henderson	U.S. Marine Corps
National War College	Commandant, National War College (NWC)	National Defense University (NDU)		Major General; Jason L. Morris	U.S. Marine Corps-->

=== Department of the Navy ===
Position insignia	Position	Part of	Photo	Incumbent	Service branch
Judge Advocate General of the Navy	Judge Advocate General of the Navy (JAG), Special Assistant for Legal Services (N09J) and Department of Defense Representative for Ocean Policy Affairs (REPOPA)	Office of the Secretary		Major General; David J. Bligh	U.S. Marine Corps

=== United States Marine Corps ===
==== Headquarters Marine Corps ====
Position insignia	Position	Part of	Photo	Incumbent	Service branch
Manpower and Reserve Affairs, Headquarters Marine Corps	Director, Manpower Management Division, Manpower and Reserve Affairs (M&RA)	Manpower and Reserve Affairs, Headquarters Marine Corps (M&RA)		Major General; Fridrik Fridriksson	U.S. Marine Corps
Manpower and Reserve Affairs, Headquarters Marine Corps	Director, Reserve Affairs Division (RA), Manpower and Reserve Affairs (M&RA)	Manpower and Reserve Affairs, Headquarters Marine Corps (M&RA)		Major General; John F. Kelliher III	U.S. Marine Corps
U.S. Marine Corps Judge Advocate Division	Staff Judge Advocate to the Commandant of the Marine Corps (SJA)	Headquarters Marine Corps (HQMC)		Major General; Christopher G. Tolar	U.S. Marine Corps
Marine Corps Intelligence	Director of Marine Corps Intelligence (MCI)	Headquarters Marine Corps (HQMC)		Major General; Mark A. Cunningham	U.S. Marine Corps
In transit
				Major General; Karl D. Pierson	U.S. Marine Corps

==== Supporting establishment ====
Position insignia	Position	Part of	Photo	Incumbent	Service branch
Marine Corps Recruiting Command	Commanding General, Marine Corps Recruiting Command (MCRC)	Not applicable		Major General; Walker M. Field	U.S. Marine Corps
U.S. Marine Corps Training and Education Command	Deputy Commanding General, U.S. Marine Corps Training and Education Command (TECOM)	Not applicable		Major General; William E. Souza III	U.S. Marine Corps
Marine Forces Reserve	Deputy Commander, Marine Forces Reserve (MARFORRES)	Not applicable		Major General; Douglas K. Clark	U.S. Marine Corps

==== Operating forces ====
Position insignia	Position	Part of	Photo	Incumbent	Service branch
Marine service component commands
U.S. Marine Corps Forces, Europe and Africa	Commander, U.S. Marine Corps Forces, Europe and Africa (MARFOREUR/AF)	U.S. European Command (USEUCOM); U.S. Africa Command (USAFRICOM)		Major General; Daniel L. Shipley	U.S. Marine Corps
U.S. Marine Corps Forces, Pacific	Deputy Commander, U.S. Marine Corps Forces, Pacific (MARFORPAC)	U.S. Indo-Pacific Command (USINDOPACOM)		Major General; Matthew T. Mowery	U.S. Marine Corps
U.S. Marine Corps Forces, Korea	Commander, U.S. Marine Corps Forces, Korea (MARFORK)	U.S. Forces Korea (USFK); U.S. Marine Corps Forces, Pacific (MARFORPAC)		Major General; Valerie A. Jackson	U.S. Marine Corps
U.S. Marine Forces Special Operations Command	Commander, U.S. Marine Forces Special Operations Command (MARSOC)	U.S. Special Operations Command (USSOCOM)		Major General; Michael A. Brooks	U.S. Marine Corps
Subordinated to I Marine Expeditionary Force
3rd Marine Aircragt Wing	Commanding General, 3rd Marine Aircraft Wing	I Marine Expeditionary Force (I MEF)		Major General; Robert B. Brodie	U.S. Marine Corps
Subordinated to II Marine Expeditionary Force
2nd Marine Division	Commanding General, 2nd Marine Division	II Marine Expeditionary Force (II MEF)		Major General; Farrell J. Sullivan	U.S. Marine Corps
2nd Marine Aircraft Wing	Commanding General, 2nd Marine Aircraft Wing	II Marine Expeditionary Force (II MEF)		Major General; Ryan S. Rideout	U.S. Marine Corps
Subordinated to III Marine Expeditionary Force
3rd Marine Division	Commanding General, 3rd Marine Division	III Marine Expeditionary Force (III MEF)		Major General; Kyle B. Ellison	U.S. Marine Corps
1st Marine Aircraft Wing	Commanding General, 1st Marine Aircraft Wing	III Marine Expeditionary Force (III MEF)		Major General; Simon M. Doran	U.S. Marine Corps
Subordinated to Marine Forces Reserve
4th Marine Division	Commanding General, 4th Marine Division	Marine Forces Reserve (MARFORRES)		Major General; Raymond L. Adams	U.S. Marine Corps
In transit
				Major General; Peter D. Huntley	U.S. Marine Corps

==== Joint task forces ====
Position insignia	Position	Part of	Photo	Incumbent	Service branch
Marine service component commands
	Commander, Joint Task Force Western Hemisphere (JTF-WHEM)	U.S. Southern Command (USSOUTHCOM)		Major General; John K. Jarrard	U.S. Marine Corps

== List of pending appointments ==
=== Retaining current position/position unannounced ===
These are general officers awaiting promotion to a higher rank while retaining their current position or do not have their future position announced yet.

Photo	Name	Service branch	Status and date
	Brigadier General; Garrett R. Hoffman	U.S. Marine Corps	Confirmed by the Senate; 22 April 2026
	Brigadier General; Michael E. McWilliams	U.S. Marine Corps	Confirmed by the Senate; 22 April 2026
	Brigadier General; David C. Walsh	U.S. Marine Corps	Confirmed by the Senate; 22 April 2026

== See also ==
- List of active duty United States four-star officers
- List of active duty United States three-star officers
- List of active duty United States Army major generals
- List of active duty United States rear admirals
- List of active duty United States Air Force major generals
- List of active duty United States Space Force general officers
- List of active duty United States senior enlisted leaders and advisors
- List of current United States National Guard major generals
- List of United States Army four-star generals
- List of United States Marine Corps four-star generals
- List of United States Navy four-star admirals
- List of United States Air Force four-star generals
- List of United States Coast Guard four-star admirals
