= VMFA-121 =

Marine Fighter Attack Squadron 121
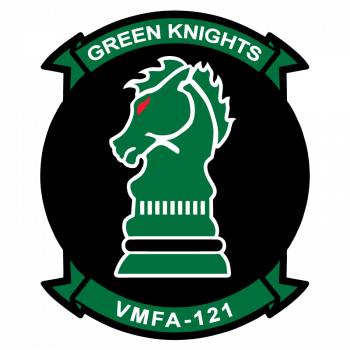
- VMFA-121 insignia
- Active: 24 June 1941 - present
- Country: United States of America
- Branch: United States Marine Corps
- Type: Fighter/Attack
- Role: Close air support Air interdiction Aerial reconnaissance
- Part of: Marine Aircraft Group 12; 1st Marine Aircraft Wing; III Marine Expeditionary Force
- Garrison/HQ: Marine Corps Air Station Iwakuni, Japan
- Nicknames: Green Knights; Radio Call Signs Combat and Cactus
- Mottos: "Have Gun Will Travel", "No Flinch, No Respect"
- Tail Code: VK
- Mascot: Ralphie
- Engagements: World War II; Battle of Guadalcanal; Battle of New Georgia; Korean War; Attack on the Sui-ho Dam; Vietnam War; Operation Earnest Will; Operation Desert Storm; Operation Southern Watch; Operation Enduring Freedom; Operation Iraqi Freedom; 2003 invasion of Iraq; Operation Epic Fury

Commanders
- Commanding Officer: LtCol. Zach Everhart
- Executive Officer: Maj Martin P. Stage
- Sergeant Major: SgtMaj Ashley Pardee

Aircraft flown
- Attack: AD-2 Skyraider; A-4 Skyhawk; A-6 Intruder
- Fighter: F4F Wildcat; F4U Corsair; F8F Bearcat; F9F-8B Cougar; F/A-18D Hornet; F-35B Lightning II

Marine Fighter Attack Squadron 121 (VMFA-121), also known as the "Green Knights", is a United States Marine Corps aircraft squadron operating the F-35B Lightning II. The squadron is based at Marine Corps Air Station Iwakuni, Japan and falls under the command of Marine Aircraft Group 12 (MAG-12) and the 1st Marine Aircraft Wing (1st MAW). Their tail code is VK and their radio call sign is "Combat".

== History ==
=== World War II ===
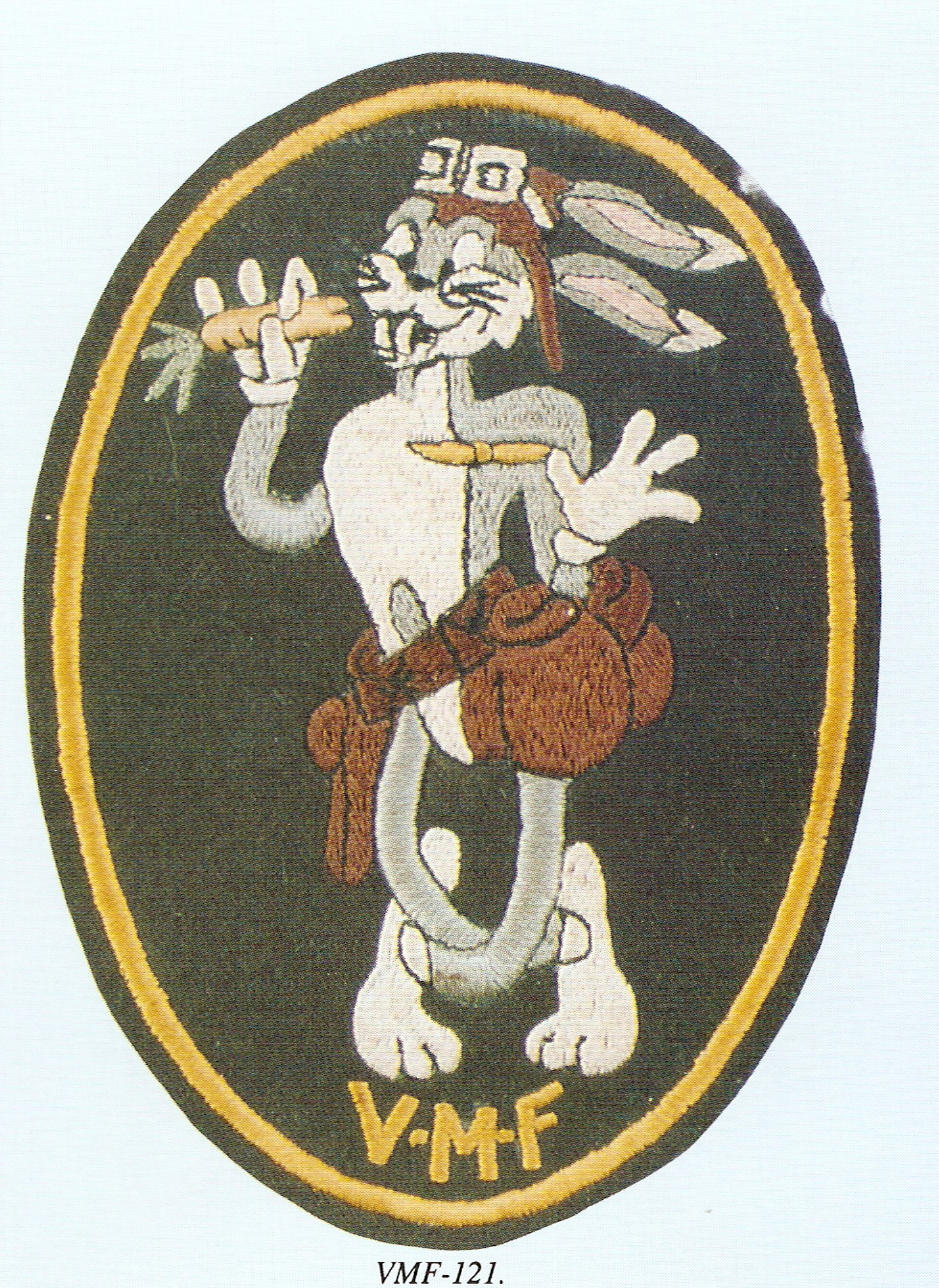
Squadron's logo when it was VMF-121

Marine Fighting Squadron 121 (VMF-121) was activated on 24 June 1941. The Green Knights began combat operations flying the F4F Wildcat and later the F4U Corsair as charter members of the Cactus Air Force and throughout the Battle of Guadalcanal arriving in October 1942. The squadron also fought from the forward air bases of Espírito Santo, Turtle Bay, Bougainville, and Emirau. On 15 September 1944, the Green Knights landed on Peleliu and fought there until 25 July 1945. They returned to the United States to be deactivated on 9 September 1945. During the Pacific War, VMF-121 produced fourteen fighter aces, more than any other squadron, including Medal of Honor recipient, Major Joseph J. Foss. VMF-121 downed 208 Japanese aircraft (165 flying Wildcats and another 44 flying Corsairs) in aerial combat.

After World War II, the squadron was reactivated in the United States at Naval Air Station Glenview, Illinois where the squadron's designation was changed to Marine Attack Squadron 121 (VMA-121) on 15 May 1951. During this time they flew a variety of aircraft including the F4U Corsair, F8F Bearcat and A-1 Skyraider.

=== Korean War ===
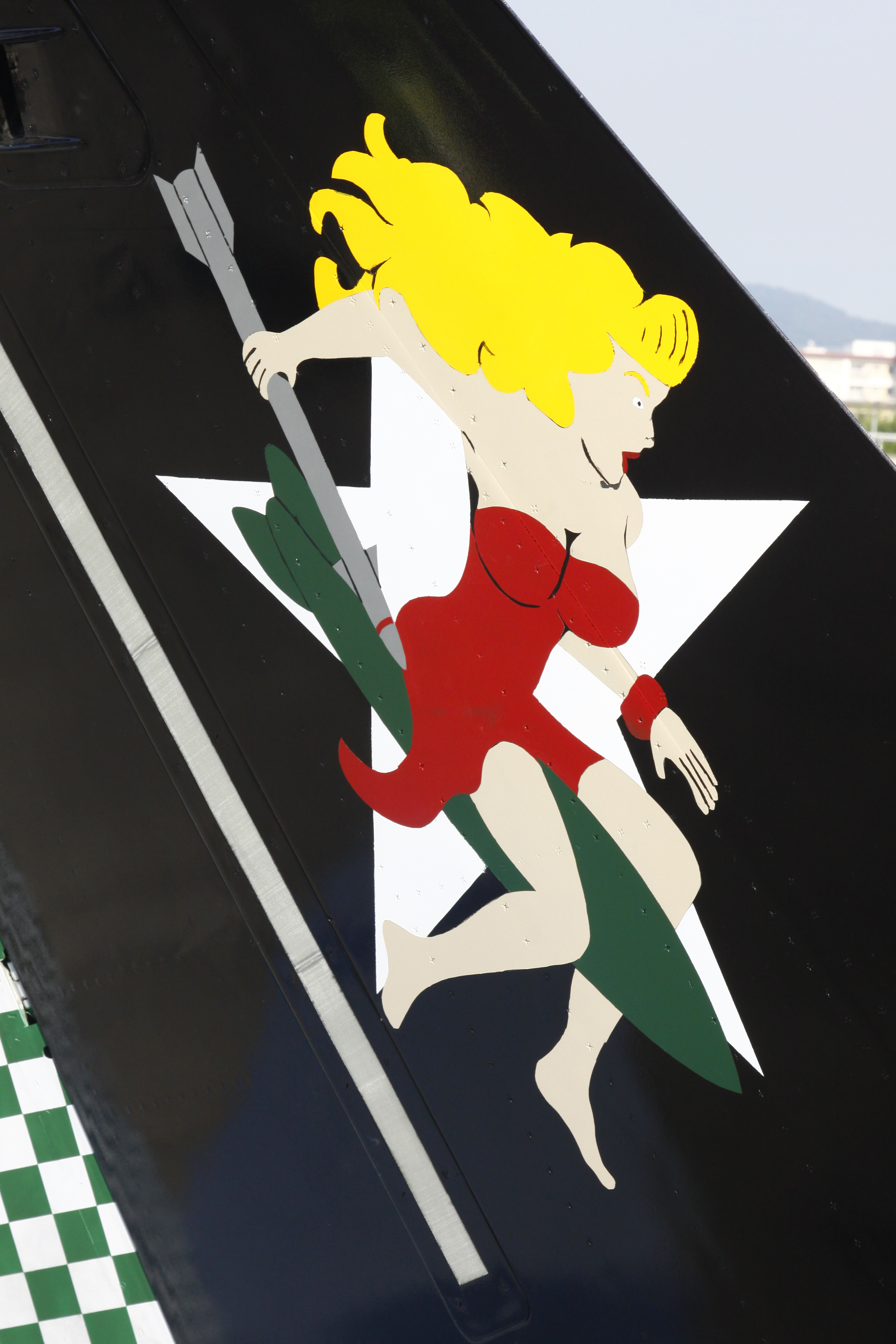
Squadron's logo when it was VMA-121 "Wolf Raiders"

In mid 1951, VMA-121 received orders to activate its reserve members and departed NAS Glenview for Marine Corps Air Station El Toro, California. After completion of training in the Skyraider, the squadron was transported aboard the carrier USS Sitkoh Bay to Yokosuka, Japan to begin final preparations for a combat deployment to the Republic of Korea. In June 1953 they also set a then Marine record for a single day's ordnance delivery when 16 AD-2 Skyraiders dropped 156 tons of bombs during the attack on the Sui-ho Dam.

VMA-121 deployed to K-6 Airfield at Pyongtaek, Republic of Korea on 19 October 1951, and conducted their first strike on 27 October. Their mission was to conduct strike missions in support of infantry operations. The squadron dropped more bomb tonnage during the Korean War than any other Navy or Marine Corps squadron, devastating enemy airfields, supply dumps, bridges, and railroad yards.

During the Korean War the Squadron insignia depicted Al Capp's "WolfGirl" from the comic strip Li'l Abner. The "Wolf Raiders" of VMA-121 remained in South Korea for several years after the Korean Armistice Agreement was signed in 1953. Returning to MCAS El Toro in 1957, the squadron assumed its role in the Unit Deployment Program with scheduled rotations to Japan and traded in its AD Skyraider aircraft and joined the jet age with the F9F-8B. The Cougar equipped with the LABS system for loft bombing, was the first aircraft flown by the squadron capable of delivering nuclear weapons.

In late 1958, the Squadron traded the Cougars for brand new A-4 Skyhawks. Spending most of the next year at the likes of NAAS Fallon, MCAS Yuma, and NOTS China Lake, the "Green Knights" became the first squadron to complete the entire special weapons delivery syllabus. During November 1962, the "Green Knights" deployed in their new A-4s to NAS Cecil Field in Jacksonville, Florida in response to the Cuban Missile Crisis.

=== Vietnam War ===
In August 1966, under the command of LtCol Donald Stiver, the Green Knights ferried their A-4E Skyhawks to MCAS Iwakuni, Japan and after preparatory training in Japan and Okinawa, began combat operations from Chu Lai Air Base, South Vietnam in December, 1966. In May 1967 VMA-121 shattered the old ordnance record for Marine Attack Squadrons by delivering over 1750 tons of ordnance in combat operations. After six months of combat operations, the squadron rotated back to MCAS Iwakuni, Japan and Naha Air Base, Okinawa before returning to Chu Lai for another combat tour in September 1967. During the first six months of that deployment, VMA-121 supported 118 major operations.

In early 1969, the squadron was reconstituted at MCAS Cherry Point, North Carolina and newly designated as VMA(AW)-121 to reflect the squadron's transition to the all-weather attack mission with the Grumman A-6 Intruder. The Green Knights were now capable of acquiring and destroying surface targets in any weather, day or night, with a wide variety of air-to-ground ordnance. The squadron participated in a 13-month deployment to MCAS Iwakuni as a member of 1st MAW. While stationed in Japan, the squadron participated in training exercises at Cubi Point Philippines and Team Sprit in Yechon, Korea. The Green Knights returned to El Toro in June 1978, and the commanding officer was Lt. Col. "WALDO" Adams.

In 1982 the squadron was awarded the Meritorious Unit Commendation (MUC) for achieving 43,000 accident free flight hours. This Commendation spanned from years previously flown in Vietnam without an accident. The award was issued while the squadron was deployed to Iwakuni, Japan and the commanding officer Lt. Col. "JACK" Rippy.

On 11 November 1985, operational control of VMA(AW)-121 was transferred to Commander, Carrier Airwing Two attached to the USS Ranger. In July 1987, under the command of LtCol. Joe "Java" Weston, the squadron deployed aboard the Ranger on a six-month WestPAC/Indian Ocean cruise. Arriving on Gonzo Station in the North Arabian Sea, the squadron participated in Operation Earnest Will, the escorting of reflagged Kuwaiti tankers.

In February 1989, the squadron once again set sail aboard the Ranger for another WestPAC/Indian Ocean cruise under the command of Pete "NODAC" Jacobs. Upon return to MCAS El Toro in August 1989, operational control of VMA(AW)-121 was transferred back to Commander, 3rd Marine Aircraft Wing (3rd MAW).

=== The Gulf War & the 1990s ===
On 8 December 1989, the squadron was redesignated as Marine Fighter Attack Squadron (All Weather) ONE TWO ONE (VMFA(AW)-121), becoming the first Marine Corps F/A-18D Hornet night attack squadron. Slightly over one year later, the squadron deployed in support of Operation Desert Storm. During the Desert Storm Air Campaign, the squadron flew 557 sorties and 1,655.5 combat hours (more than any other Navy or Marine Corps tactical jet squadron).

Returning to MCAS El Toro following the cessation of hostilities, the Green Knights resumed the unit deployment rotation and relocated to Marine Corps Air Station Miramar, California during August 1994 when custody of that installation was transferred from the Navy (as NAS Miramar) to the Marine Corps pursuant to BRAC action that also closed MCAS El Toro. The Green Knights made three deployments to the Western Pacific before returning to combat over Iraq in March 2000. During this 2000 deployment, the squadron flew 287 sorties in support of Operation Southern Watch (OSW) while based at Ahmad al-Jaber Air Base, Kuwait, providing much-needed operational tempo (OPTEMPO) relief to active duty USAF, Air Force Reserve and Air National Guard A-10 Thunderbolt II fighter squadrons that had been manning the OSW mission at Al Jaber since the end of the first Gulf War.

=== Global War on Terror and beyond ===
In April 2002, the squadron deployed with six aircraft to Kyrgyzstan, followed by the remaining six aircraft and personnel a month later. The squadron flew more than 900 combat sorties over Afghanistan in support of Operation Enduring Freedom, returning to MCAS Miramar in October 2002.

Only 3 months after returning from Kyrgyzstan, the Green Knights deployed to Al Jaber Air Base, Kuwait. From February to May 2003, the squadron flew more than 750 combat sorties over Iraq in support of Operation Southern Watch and Operation Iraqi Freedom, and returned to MCAS Miramar on 12 May.

In March 2005, the squadron deployed as part of the Unit Deployment Program to MCAS Iwakuni, Japan. The squadron returned to MCAS Miramar on 15 September 2005.

In February 2007, the squadron deployed to Al Asad Air Base, Iraq in support of Operation Iraqi Freedom 06–08.

The squadron deployed as part of the Unit Deployment Program to Marine Corps Air Station Iwakuni, Japan from September 2008 to March 2009, March 2010 to September 2010, and January 2012 to July 2012.

On 17 August 2011, an F/A-18D from VMFA(AW)-121 crashed into the Pacific Ocean approximately 85 miles southwest of San Diego. Both pilot and WSO ejected safely.

=== F-35B Lightning II Joint Strike Fighter Era ===
On 28 September 2012, LtCol. Jeff Scott took command of the Green Knights from LtCol. Michael Waterman, marking the end of the F/A-18D Hornet's tenure in VMFA(AW)-121 and ushering in the fifth-generation stealth fighter era. This change of command officially moved the squadron from MAG-11 at MCAS Miramar to MAG-13 at MCAS Yuma. On 20 November, VMFA(AW)-121 was officially redesignated VMFA-121, accepting delivery of the first three F-35B aircraft becoming the first operational F-35B squadron in the Marine Corps Operating Forces and the first operational F-35 squadron in any service.

On 9 January 2017, VMFA-121 permanently departed Marine Corps Air Station Yuma, Arizona transferring to Marine Corps Air Station Iwakuni, Japan.

On 18 January 2017, VMFA-121 arrived at MCAS Iwakuni, Japan as the first forward deployed permanent F-35B squadron.

On 24 April 2018, an F-35B belonging to the squadron made an emergency landing at Fukuoka airport.

On 29 September 2020, an F-35B crashed in California after having a midair collision with a KC-130 from VMGR-152.

On 25 March 2025, an F-35B made an emergency landing at Kōchi Airport in Kōchi, Japan.

VMFA-121 is reportedly one of the embarked squadron onboard the USS Tripoli on its deployment to the Middle East during the 2026 Iran war.

== Squadron aces ==
- Robert M. Baker – 7.0
- Leonard K. Davis – 5.0
- Cecil J. Doyle – 5.0
- Kenneth M. Ford – 5.0
- Joe Foss – 26.0
- William B. Freeman – 6.0
- Roger A. Haberman – 7.0
- Gregory K. Loesch – 8.5
- Herbert H. Long – 10.0
- Thomas H. Mann – 10.0
- William P. Marontate – 13.0
- Henry A. McCartney – 5.0
- Joseph L. Narr – 8.0
- Robert B. Porter – 5.0
- Frank H. Presley – 6.0
- Joseph H. Reinburg – 7.0
- Perry L. Shuman – 6.0
- Donald K. Yost – 8.0

== Aircraft losses ==
- Capt Claude N. Williams (087244) - killed when his A-4E, BuNo 151123, crashed during a nighttime GCA landing near Chu Lai Airfield.

== Gallery ==
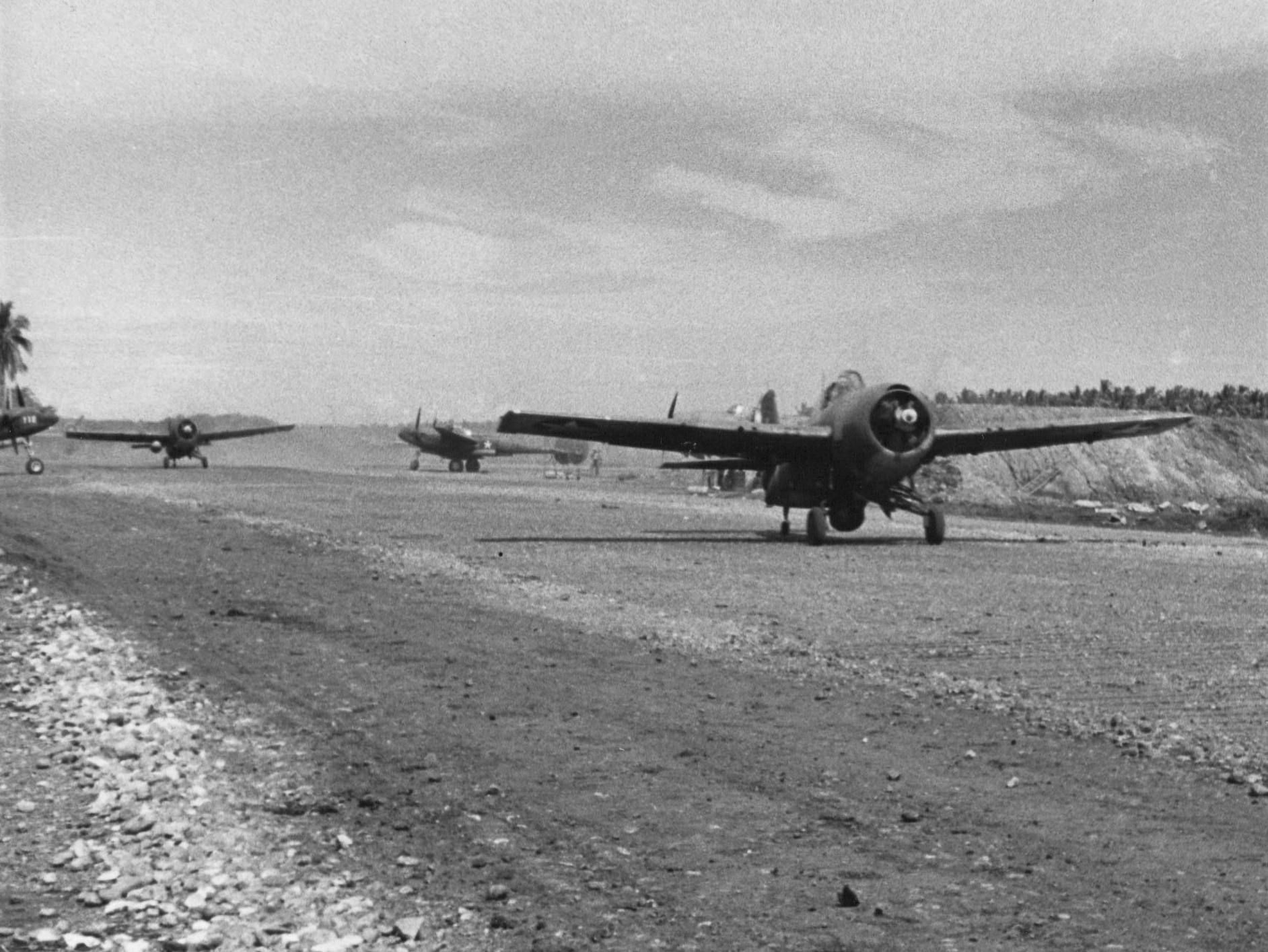
VMF-121 F4F-4s at Guadalcanal

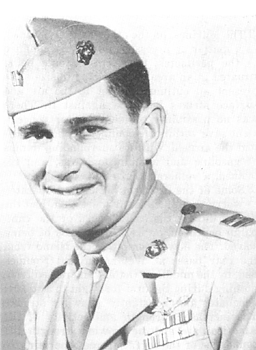
Capt. Joe Foss, VMF-121 Medal of Honor recipient

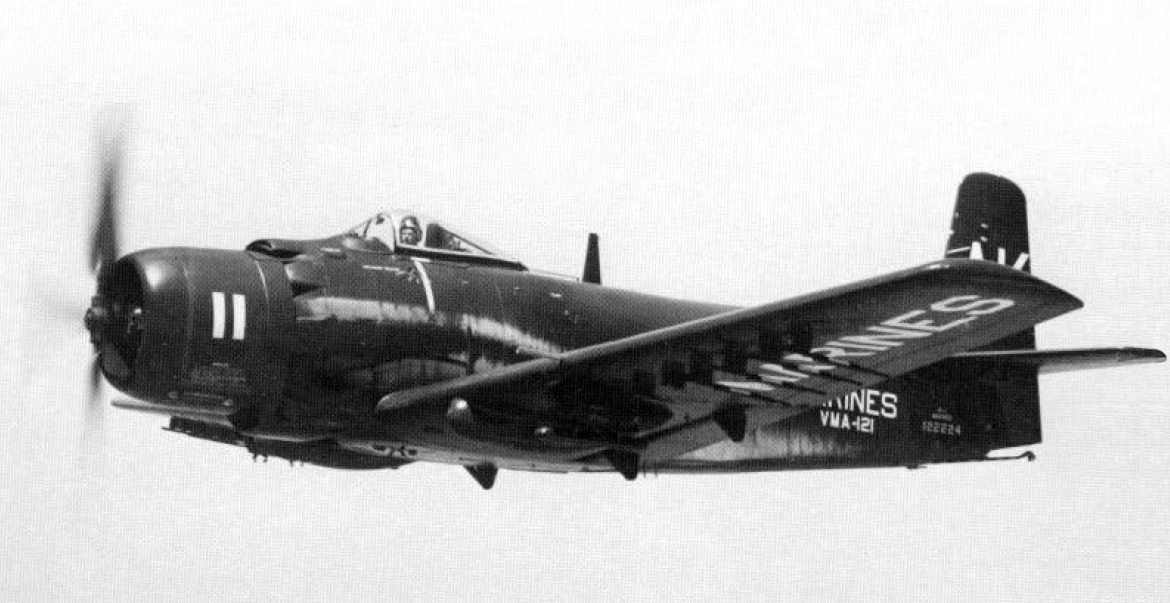
VMA-121 AD-2 Skyraider, Korea

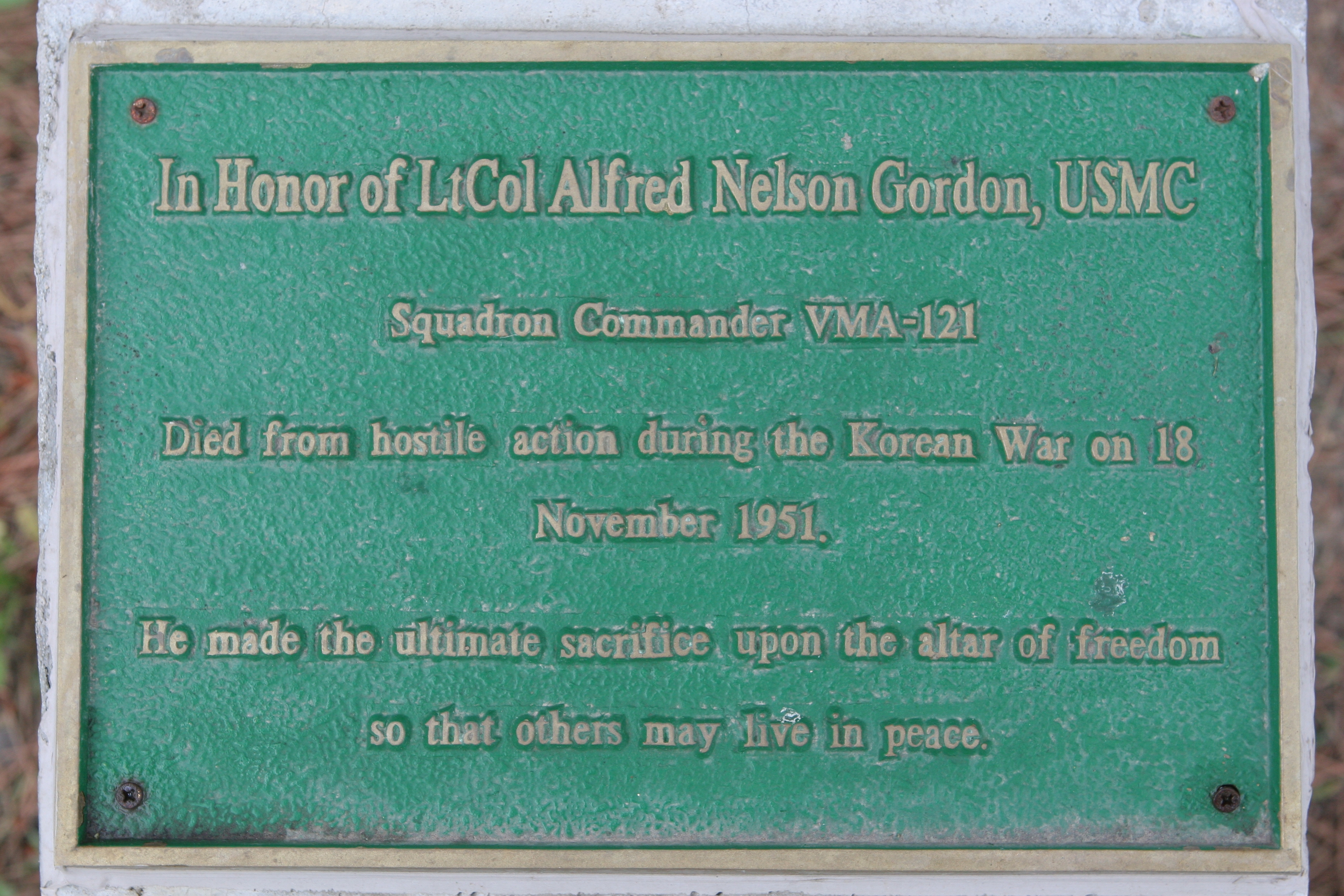
Plaque located at Camp Mujuk, Korea that commemorates LtCol. Alfred Nelson Gordon, CO of VMA-121 who died during the Korean War

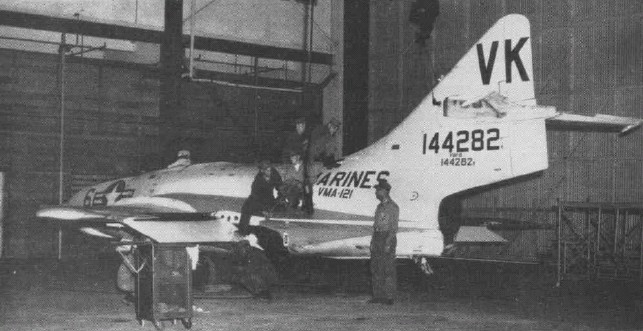
VMA-121 F9F-8 Cougar at MCAS El Toro, 1958

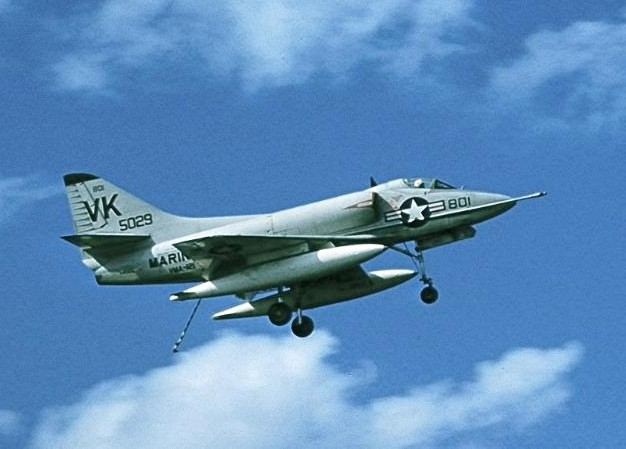
An A4D-2 after a wave-off from USS Coral Sea in 1960/61.

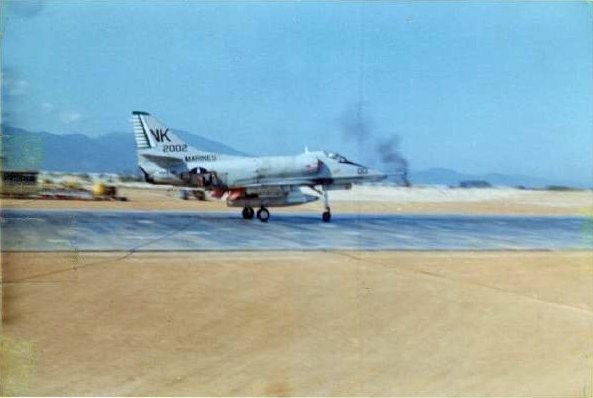
An A-4E from VMA-121 landing at Chu Lai, March 1967.

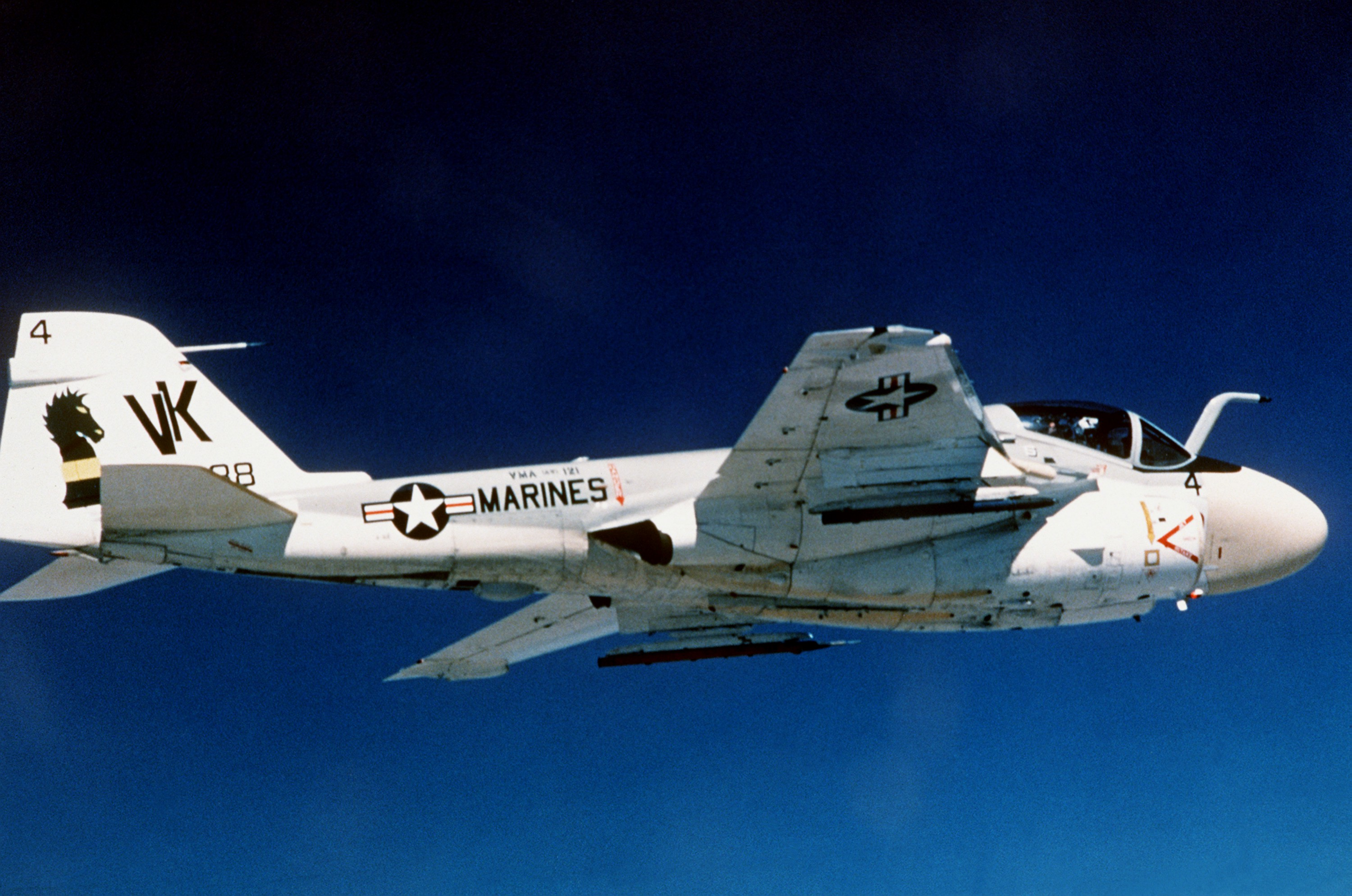
A-6 Intruder of VMA(AW)-121

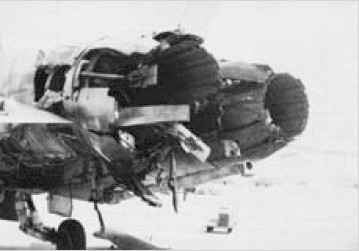
VMFA(AW)-121 Hornet damaged during the Gulf War in 1991

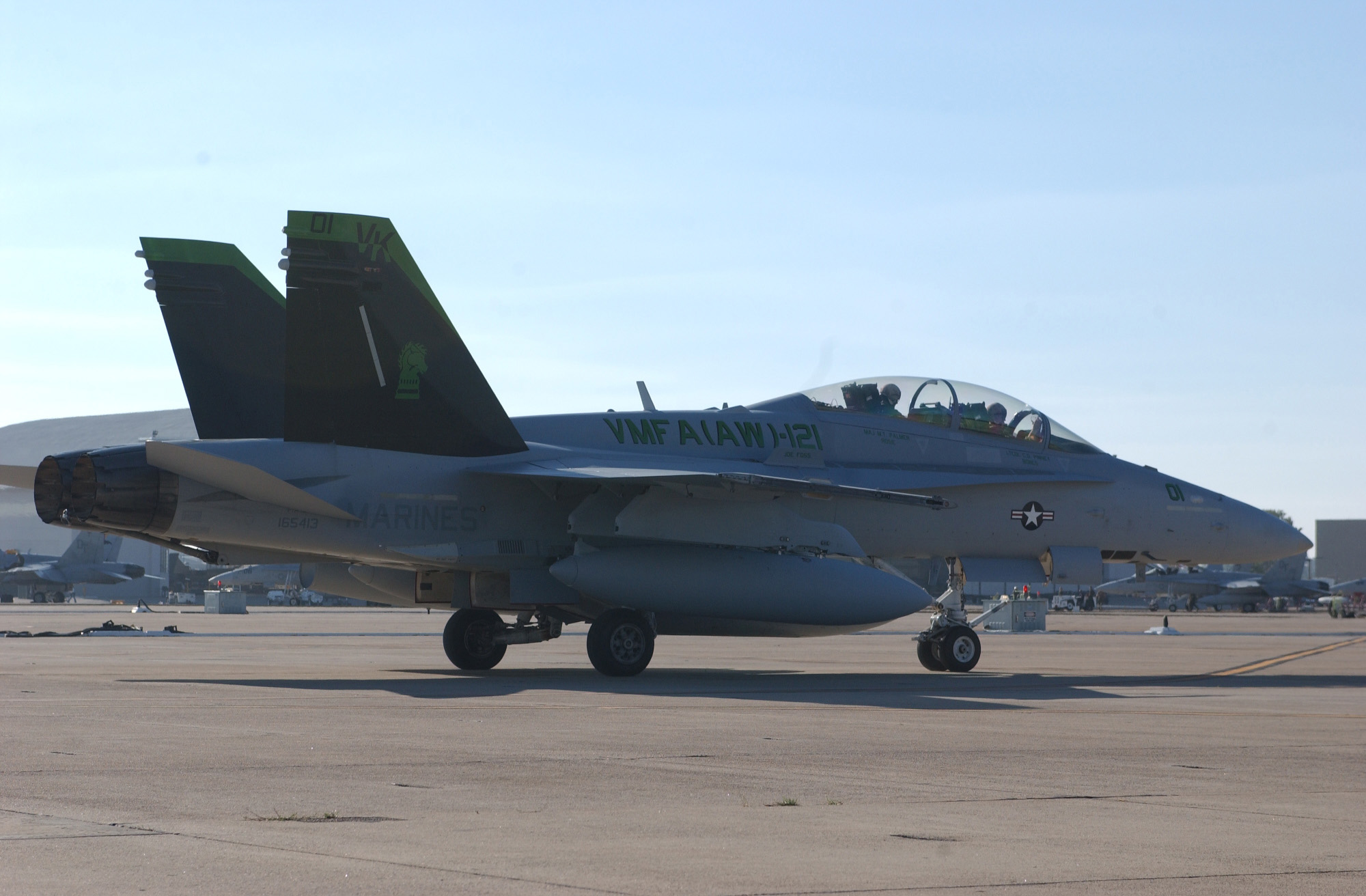
F/A-18D CAG Bird Of VMFA(AW)-121

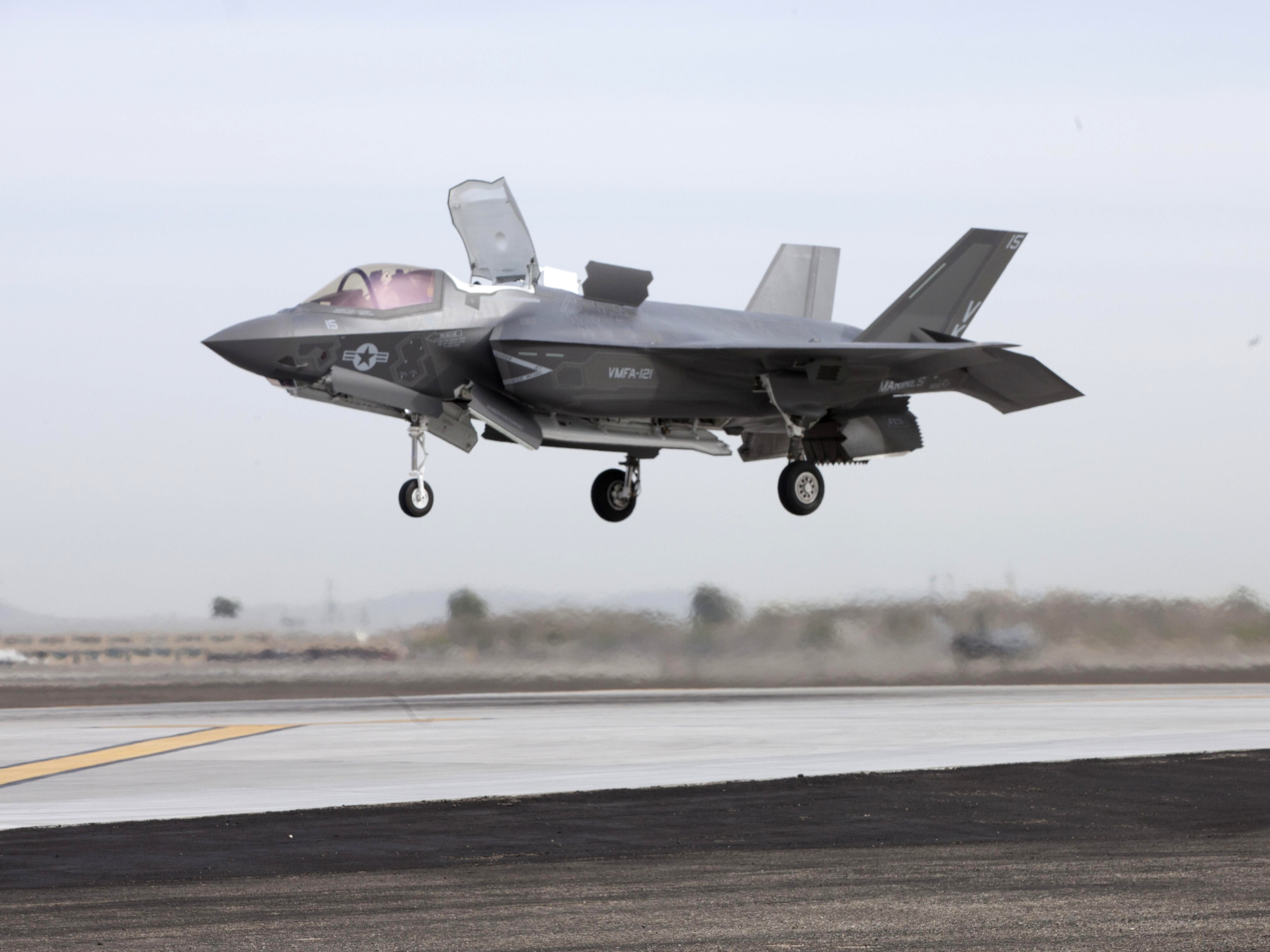
A VMFA-121 F-35B at MCAS Yuma, in 2013

== See also ==
- List of active United States Marine Corps aircraft squadrons
- United States Marine Corps Aviation
