= Bradley S. James =

U.S. Marine Corps general

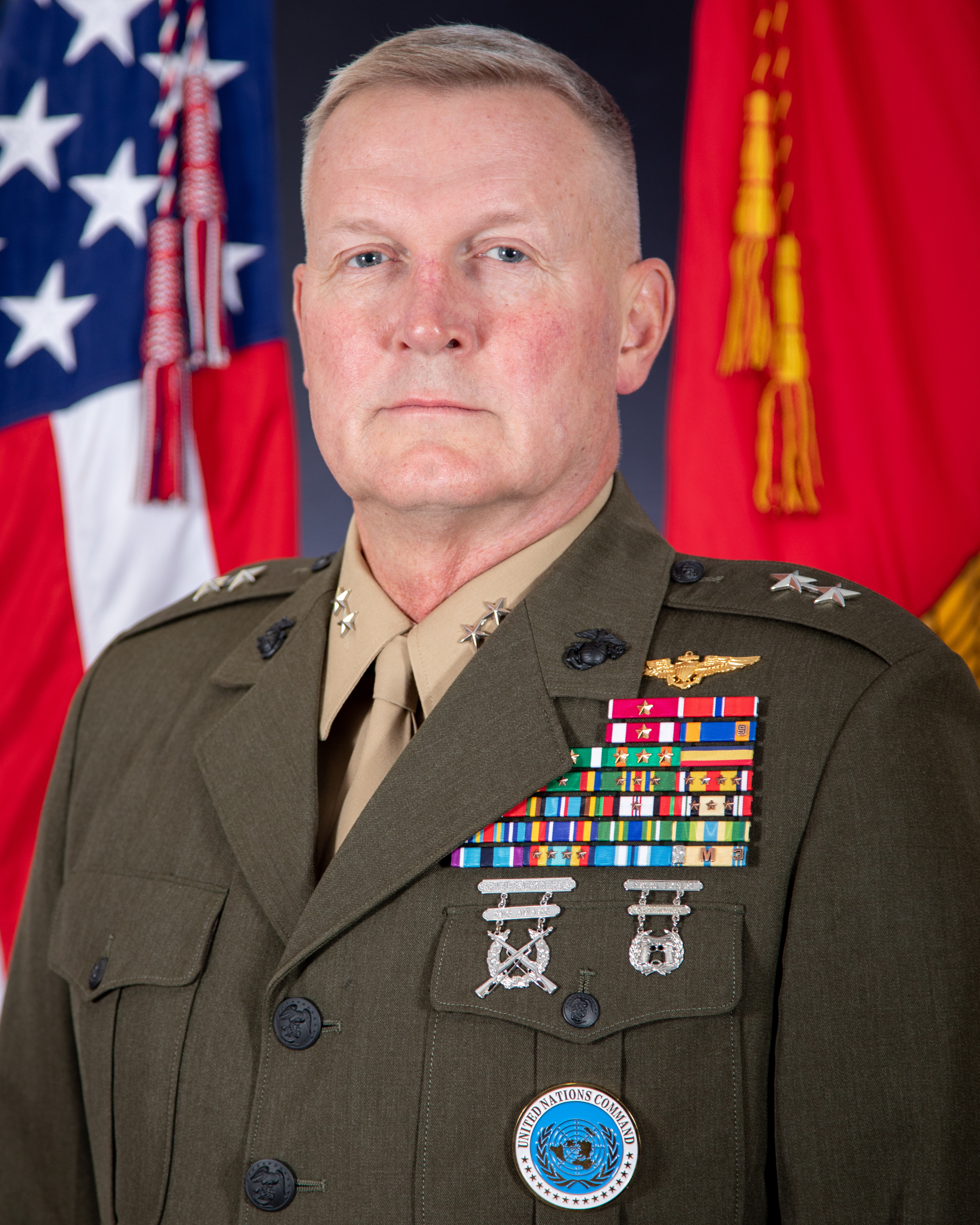
- Official portrait, 2021
- Military career
- Allegiance: United States
- Branch: United States Marine Corps
- Service years: 1984–2022
- Rank: Major General
- Commands: U.S. Marine Corps Forces, Korea; U.S. Marine Forces Reserve/North; 4th Marine Aircraft Wing; VMGR-452
- Conflicts: Afghanistan; Iraq
- Awards: Distinguished Service Medal; Legion of Merit x2 Bronze Star Medal; Meritorious Service Medal x2 Air Strike Medal x9 Marine Corps Commendation Medal x2 Marine Corps Achievement Medal x4

Bradley Steven James is a retired United States Marine Corps Major General who most recently served as the Commander of United States Marine Corps Forces, Korea, Component Commander of the United Nations Command and the Deputy Commander of the Combined Marine Corps Command (USMC & ROK) from May 30, 2019 to June 27, 2022. His previous general officer assignments were as Commanding General of the 4th Marine Aircraft Wing from April 29, 2016 until April 13, 2019 and as the Commander of Marine Forces Reserve and US Marine Forces North from November 2018 to May 2019.

Born in Atlanta and raised in Austell, Georgia, James graduated from Kennesaw College which is now Kennesaw State University on Dec 13,1985. After attending The Basic School in Quantico, VA, he graduated from the US Naval Flight Training on the Commodore's List Jan 15, 1988. He has logged over 5000 flight hours as a KC-130 aerial refueling and air assault pilot.

Military offices
| Preceded by William T. Collins | Commanding General of the 4th Marine Aircraft Wing; 2016–2019 | Succeeded by Timothy L. Adams |
| Preceded by Burke W. Whitman | Commanding General of United States Marine Corps Reserve; 2018–2019 | Succeeded by Michael S. Martin |
| Preceded by Patrick J. Hermesmann | Commander of United States Marine Corps Forces, Korea; 2019–2022 | Succeeded by Brian N. Wolford |
