= Michael Fahey =

Michael Fahey may refer to:

- Mike Fahey, mayor of Omaha, Nebraska
- Michael F. Fahey, United States Marine Corps general
