= Michael S. Martin (general) =

U.S. Marine Corps general

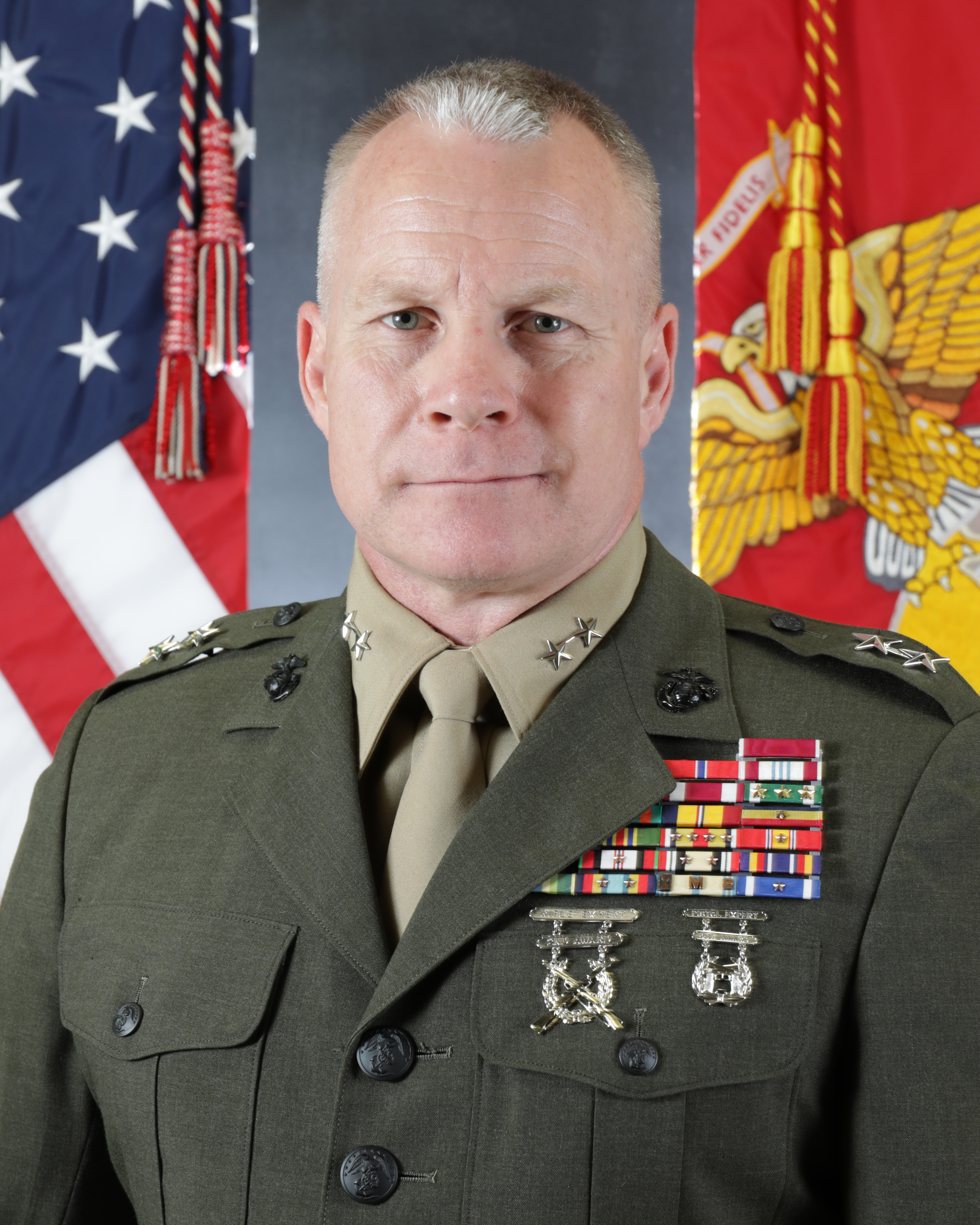
- Official portrait, 2020
- Born: Holyoke, Massachusetts, U.S.
- Military career
- Allegiance: United States
- Branch: United States Marine Corps
- Service years: 1990–2024
- Rank: Major General
- Commands: United States Marine Corps Reserve; 4th Marine Division; 25th Marine Regiment; 4th Light Armored Reconnaissance Battalion; Bravo Company, 4th Light Armored Reconnaissance Battalion

Michael S. Martin is a retired United States Marine Corps major general who has served as Assistant Deputy Commandant for Plans, Policies, and Operations from 2023 to 2024. He most recently served as Director of Reserve Affairs of the United States Marine Corps from 2022 to 2023. He served as the Assistant Deputy Commandant for Combat Development and Integration in 2022. He most recently served as the Deputy Commander of the Marine Forces Reserve. Previously, he served as the Commanding General of the 4th Marine Division from September 8, 2018 to October 2, 2020.

Military offices
Preceded by Burke W. Whitman	Commanding General of the 4th Marine Division; 2018–2020	Succeeded by Michael F. Fahey
Preceded by Bradley S. James	Commander of the United States Marine Corps Reserve; 2019	Succeeded by David Bellon
Preceded by Helen G. Pratt	Director of Reserve Affairs of the United States Marine Corps; 2022–2023	Succeeded by Karl D. Pierson
