= Mark Hashimoto =

U.S. Marine Corps general

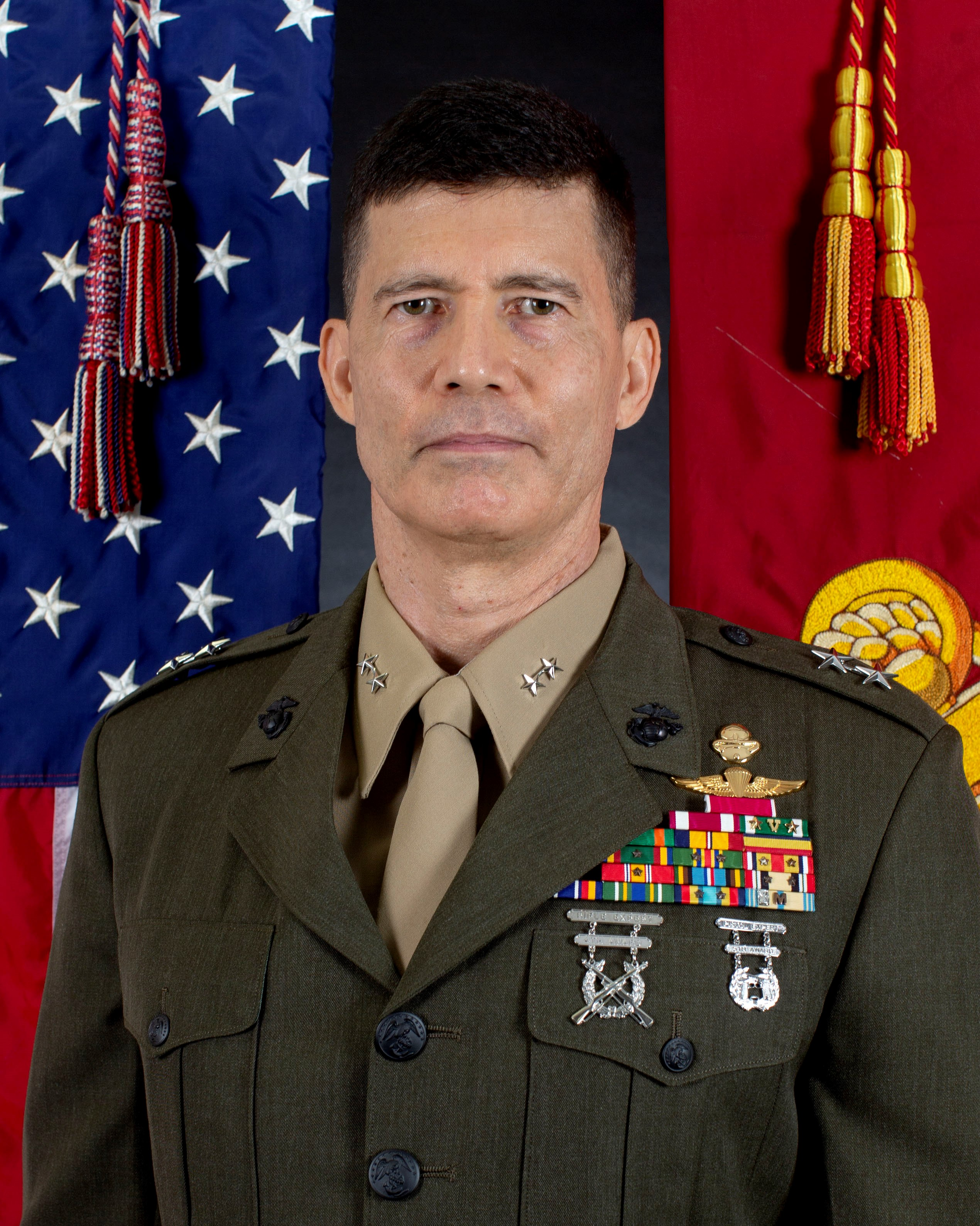
- Official portrait, 2021
- Born: Honolulu, Hawaii, U.S.
- Military career
- Allegiance: United States
- Branch: United States Marine Corps
- Service years: 1992–2024
- Rank: Major General
- Commands: Force Headquarters Group; 4th Reconnaissance Battalion

Mark A. Hashimoto is a retired United States Marine Corps major general who last served as the Mobilization Assistant to the Commander of the United States Indo-Pacific Command from 2021 to 2024. Previously, he served as the Commanding General of Force Headquarters Group of the Marine Forces Reserve from August 2018 to April 2021.

Military offices
Preceded by Michael F. Fahey	Commanding General of the Force Headquarters Group; 2018–2021	Succeeded by Sean N. Day
Preceded by Suzanne P. Vares-Lum	Mobilization Assistant to the Commander of the United States Indo-Pacific Command; 2021–2024	Vacant
