= Helen Pratt =

U.S. Marine Corps general

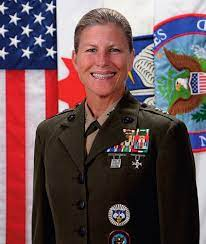
- Official portrait, 2018
- Military career
- Allegiance: United States
- Branch: United States Marine Corps
- Service years: 1992–2022
- Rank: Major General
- Commands: 4th Marine Logistics Group; Force Headquarters Group; Marine Corps University

Helen G. Pratt is a retired United States Marine Corps major general who last served as the Director of Reserve Affairs of the United States Marine Corps from 2019 to 2022. Previously, she served as the Commanding General of the 4th Marine Logistics Group from August 13, 2016 to July 14, 2018.

Military offices
| Preceded by ??? | Commanding General and President of the Marine Corps University; 2014–2016 | Succeeded by Thomas A. Gorry |
| Preceded by Paul K. Lebidine | Commanding General of the Force Headquarters Group; 2014–2016 | Succeeded by Michael F. Fahey |
| Preceded by Patrick J. Hermesmann | Commanding General of the 4th Marine Logistics Group; 2016–2018 | Succeeded by Karl D. Pierson |
| Preceded by Stan A. Sheley | Director of Logistics and Engineering of the North American Aerospace Defense Command and United States Northern Command; 2018–2019 | Succeeded by Michelle M. Rose |
| Preceded by ??? | Director of Reserve Affairs of the United States Marine Corps; 2019–2022 | Succeeded by Michael S. Martin |
