= Michael F. Fahey =

U.S. Marine Corps general

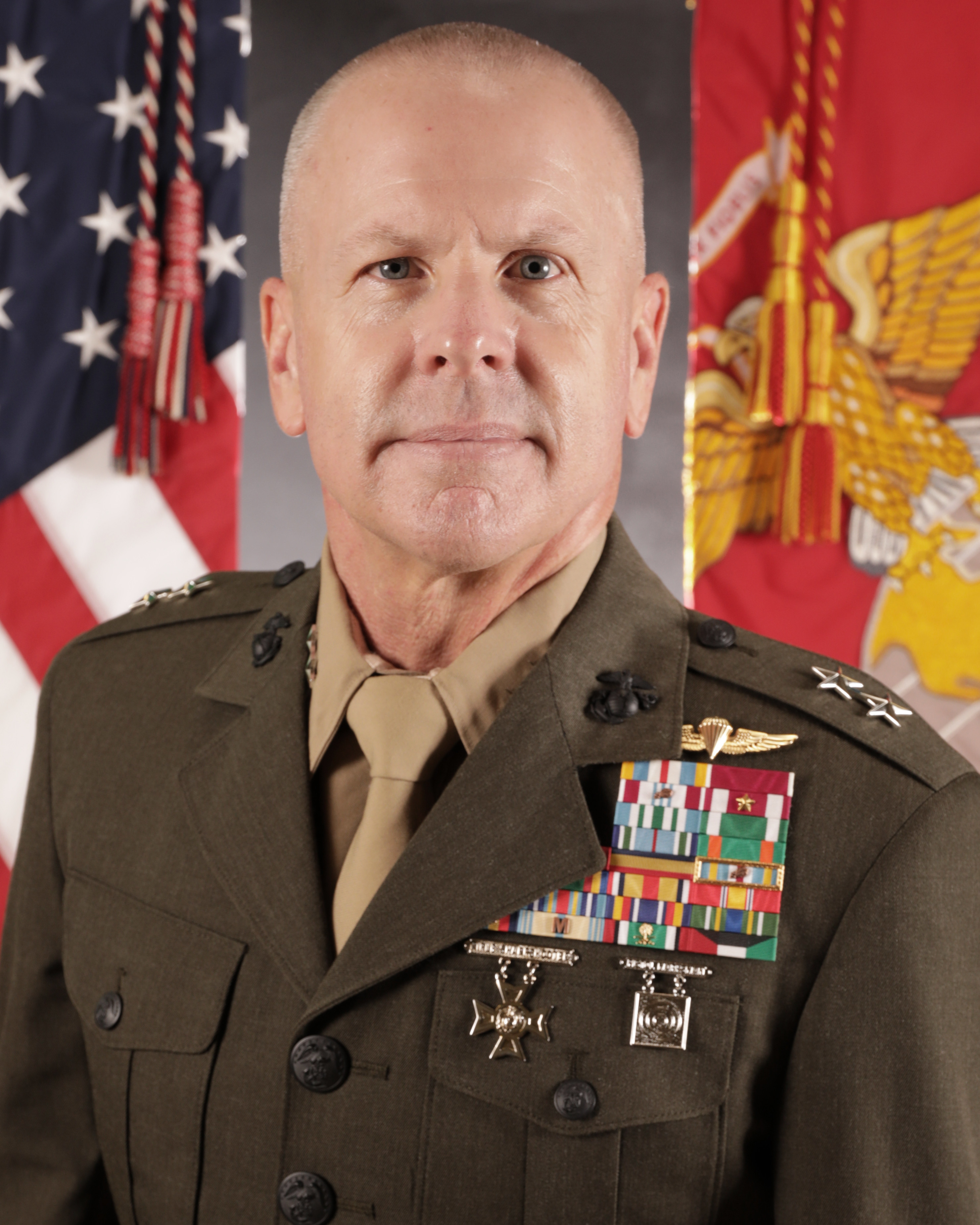
- Official portrait, 2020
- Military career
- Allegiance: United States
- Branch: United States Marine Corps
- Service years: 1987–2022
- Rank: Major General
- Commands: 4th Marine Division; Marine Corps Forces South; Force Headquarters Group; Intelligence Support Battalion; 4th Force Reconnaissance Company; Alpha Company, Intelligence Support Battalion

Michael F. Fahey III is a retired United States Marine Corps major general who last served as the Commanding General of the 4th Marine Division from October 2020 to June 2022. Previously, he served as the Commander of the Marine Corps Forces South from August 2018 to September 2020.

Military offices
Preceded by Helen Pratt	Commanding General of the Force Headquarters Group; 2016–2018	Succeeded by Mark Hashimoto
Preceded by David Bellon	Commander of the Marine Corps Forces South; 2018–2020	Succeeded by Phillip N. Frietze
Preceded by Michael S. Martin	Commanding General of the 4th Marine Division; 2020–2022	Succeeded by Douglas K. Clark
