= Valerie A. Jackson =

U.S. Marine Corps general

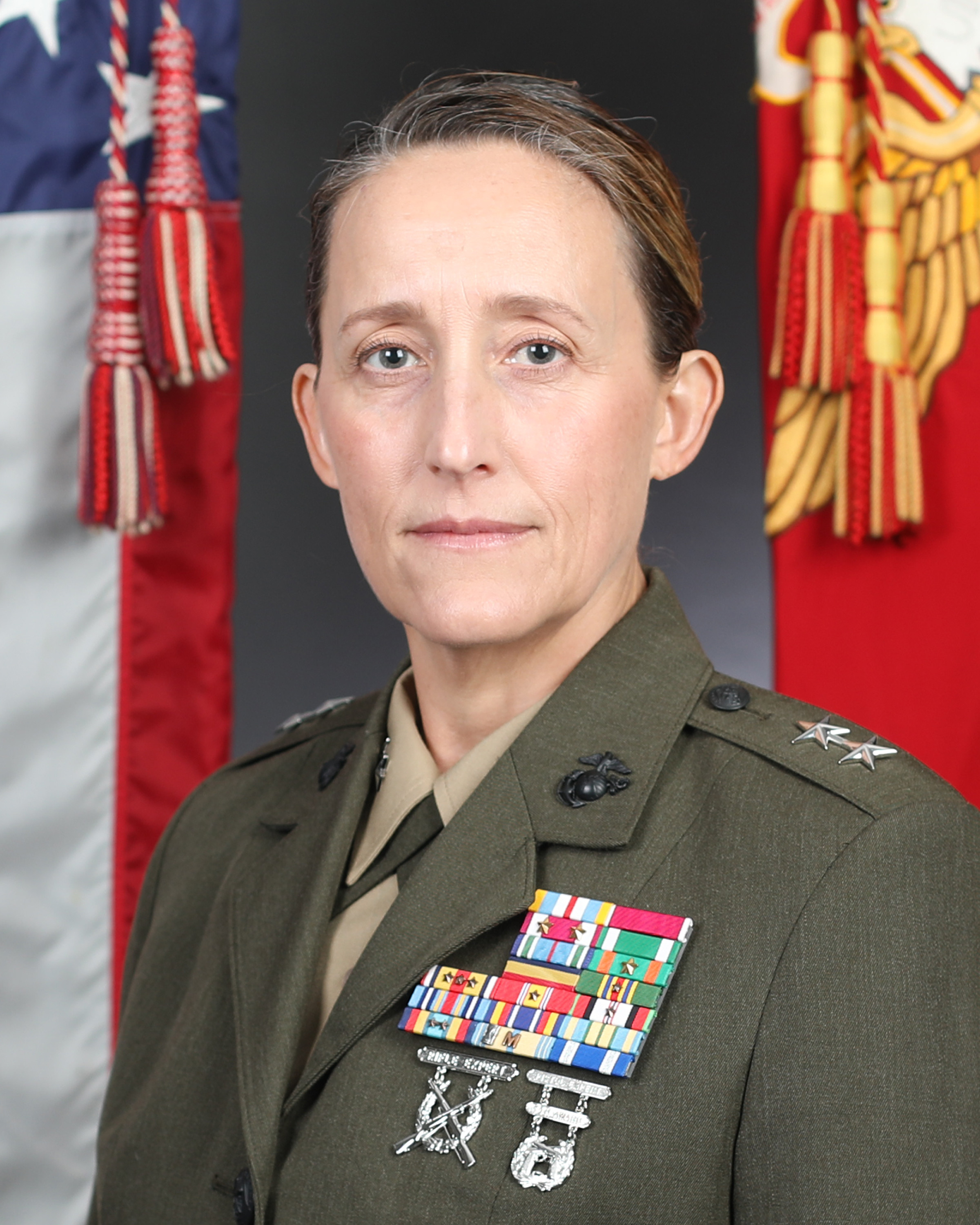
- Official portrait, 2024
- Military career
- Allegiance: United States
- Branch: United States Marine Corps
- Service years: 1994–present
- Rank: Major general
- Commands: U.S. Marine Corps Forces, Korea; 4th Marine Logistics Group; Marine Wing Communications Squadron 48
- Conflicts: Afghanistan
- Awards: Defense Superior Service Medal; Legion of Merit; Meritorious Service Medal x 3 Navy and Marine Corps Commendation Medal; Joint Service Achievement Medal; Navy and Marine Corps Achievement Medal x2

Valerie A. Jackson is a United States Marine Corps (USMC) Major general who currently serves as the Commander of United States Marine Corps Forces, Korea, Component Commander of the United Nations Command and the Deputy Commander of the Combined Marine Corps Command (USMC and Republic of Korea Marine Corps) since June 2025.

== Military career ==
A native New Englander, Second lieutenant Ray entered the Marine Corps from Boston University's NROTC program in 1994. She completed The Basic School and Basic Communication Officers' Course in 1995 and reported to Marine Wing Communications Squadron 28 (MWCS-28) in Cherry Point, North Carolina, as a communications officer. While at MWCS-28, Ray served Platoon Commander and Detachment Operations and Executive Officer. In 1996, she deployed to Lima, Peru, supporting a radar detachment in the Amazon River valley for Operation Laser Strike. Ray joined Marine Combat Training Battalion (MCT), School of Infantry-East (SOI-East) in 1997 as a company executive officer. In 1998, then Captain Jackson transitioned to SOI's Headquarters and Service Battalion to serve as Marines Awaiting Training and Headquarters and Service Company Commanders, and finally as Headquarters and Service Battalion executive officer. In July 1999, she transferred to the United States Marine Corps Reserve. During August 2003, Jackson became the Peacetime/Wartime Support Team Officer-in-Charge for India Company, 3d Battalion, 23d Marines, 4th Marine Division in Little Rock, Arkansas.

Major Jackson joined the United States Marine Corps History Division in 2006 as the senior editor and a field historian. In 2008, Jackson joined the SCETC Civil-Military Operations Branch, assisting in the creation of the first USMC Civil Affairs MOS School. Jackson deployed to Operation Enduring Freedom (OEF) with Marine Expeditionary Brigade-Afghanistan's G-9 in 2009. Lieutenant colonel Jackson joined II Marine Expeditionary Force (II MEF) as the CMO Planner in 2011 before transitioning to the II MEF G-6 as the Reserve Operations Officer. She subsequently served as the Marine Forces Reserve Force Headquarters Group (FHG) G-6. From December 2013 to May 2016, she was the commanding officer of Marine Wing Communications Squadron 48 (MWCS-48). In May 2015, she transferred to the 8th Marine Corps Recruiting District as a Recruiting Support Officer, Dallas, Texas. From 2016-2018, she commanded the 4th Civil Affairs Group in Hialeah, Florida. Before assuming her duties as Vice Chief of Staff at Marine Forces Reserve, she worked as the Deputy Director for Information Plans and Strategy at DC-Information, HQMC.

She assumed her first general officer position as Deputy Commander (IMA) at II MEF in March 2022, served briefly as Director of Operations, PP&O, and deployed to Combined Joint Task Force - Horn of Africa as the Deputy Commanding General in January 2023. From June 2023 to May 2025, she was the Commanding General, 4th Marine Logistics Group. She assumed her current position as Commander, Marine Forces, Korea in June 2025.

Jackson's personal awards include the Defense Superior Service Medal, Legion of Merit, three Meritorious Service Medals, the Navy and Marine Corps Commendation Medal, the Joint Service Achievement Medal, and two Navy and Marine Corps Achievement Medals. She holds a Master’s degree in Strategic Studies from the US Army War College (distinguished graduate), a Master of Arts in Liberal Studies/Conflict Management and Resolution from UNC-Wilmington, and a Bachelor's in History from Boston University.

Military offices
Preceded by William E. Souza III	Commander of United States Marine Corps Forces, Korea; 2025–present	Succeeded by
