= Marine Air Control Group 48 =

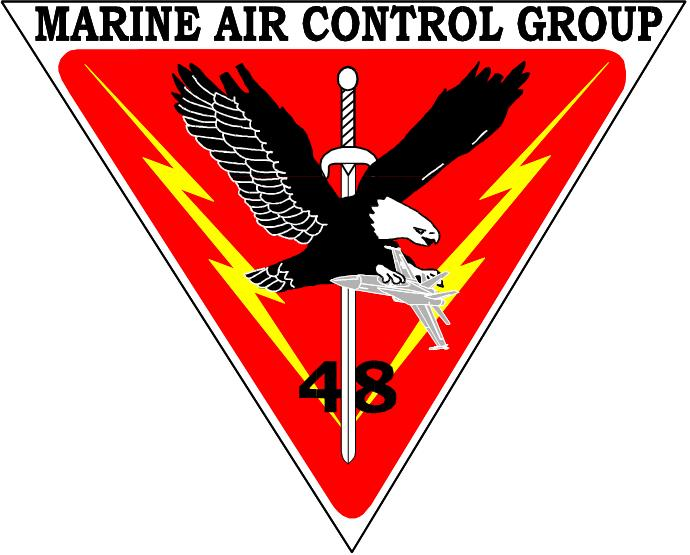
- MACG-48 insignia
- Active: 1 September 1967
- Country: United States
- Branch: United States Marine Corps
- Role: Aviation command & control
- Size: Group Command
- Part of: 4th Marine Aircraft Wing; Marine Forces Reserve
- Garrison/HQ: Naval Station Great Lakes
- Motto: Semper Fidelis
- Colors: Scarlet & Gold
- Anniversaries: commissioning date -1 September 1967
- Engagements: Vietnam War; Operation Desert Storm; Operation Enduring Freedom; Operation Iraqi Freedom

Commanders
- Current commander: Colonel Ryan P. Allen

Marine Air Control Group 48 (MACG-48) is a United States Marine Corps aviation command and control unit based at Naval Station Great Lakes that is currently composed of 4 squadrons that provide the 4th Marine Aircraft Wing and Marine Forces Reserve with a tactical headquarters, positive and procedural control of aircraft, air defense and aviation command and control.

== Mission ==
Coordinate all aspects of air command and control and air defense within the Marine aircraft wing. Provide the command and staff functions for the MACG commander when deployed as part of the aviation combat element (ACE) of the Marine Air Ground Task Force.

== Subordinate units ==
- Marine Air Control Squadron 24
- Marine Air Support Squadron 6
- Marine Tactical Air Command Squadron 48
- Marine Wing Communications Squadron 48
- Site Support Great Lakes
- Site Support Chicopee
- Site Support Oceana

== History ==
Marine Air Control Group 48 was activated on 1 September 1967, at Glenview, Illinois, and assigned to 4th Marine Aircraft Wing. From the late 1960s through the 1970s and 1980s, MACG-48 participated in many training exercises, honing its combat skills and refining its tactics, techniques and procedures in order to keep abreast of the ever-changing C3 community. In April 1980, members of MWCS-48 were on call for 'Operation EagleClaw' in Iran. The mission was aborted.

From August 1990 to April 1991, MACG-48 marines deployed in support of Operation Desert Shield and Operation Desert Storm augmenting the active duty component. Upon the unit's return to Illinois, the control group continued its support of numerous exercises across the globe. The group focused its training on the tactics, techniques and procedures critical for success in the Southwest Asia region, using lessons learned during combat.

In August 1995, MACG-48 relocated to Fort Sheridan in Highwood, Illinois. After five years in Highwood, the group headquarters moved again to its current location aboard Naval Station Great Lakes near Chicago, Illinois.

While at Great Lakes, MACG-48 mobilized marines twice in support of Operation Enduring Freedom and Operation Iraqi Freedom. From August 2002 to November 2003 and again from August 2004 to February 2005, over 1400 marines from MACG-48 were activated in support of the Global War on Terror. During December 2004, marines activated to augment units in support of Combined Joint Task Force – Horn of Africa in Djibouti.

In August 2005, Hurricane Katrina ravaged the Gulf Coast of the United States. Once again, marines from MACG-48 were called upon to provide command and control expertise and long-haul communication support in support of disaster relief efforts. From September to October 2005, one hundred marines augmented Joint Task Force Katrina in New Orleans, Louisiana.

== See also ==
- List of United States Marine Corps aircraft groups
- List of United States Marine Corps aircraft squadrons
