= William P. Marontate =

US Marine Corps flying ace

William Pratt Marontate
- Nickname: "Tate"
- Born: December 3, 1919; Seattle, Washington, US
- Died: January 15, 1943 (aged 23) near Vella Lavella, New Georgia Islands
- Allegiance: United States
- Branch: United States Marine Corps
- Service years: 1941–1943
- Rank: First Lieutenant; Captain (posthumously)
- Conflicts: World War II: Guadalcanal campaign †
- Awards: Navy Cross; Air Medal (4); Purple Heart

William Pratt Marontate (December 3, 1919 – January 15, 1943) was a decorated United States Marine Corps flying ace who was awarded the Navy Cross during World War II. He was credited with 13 aerial victories before he was killed in action.

== Early life and service ==
William P. Marontate was born on December 3, 1919, in Seattle, Washington. Marontate joined the Marine Corps in June 1941. Designated as a Naval aviator, Marontate was assigned to Marine Fighting Squadron 121 (VMF-121) at Camp Kearney, California.

While at Camp Kearney in August 1942, Marontate took one of the few operational planes the squadron had and crashed it into a gun emplacement. He was subsequently reprimanded by the squadron's new executive officer, Captain Joe Foss. It was Foss's first day as the XO. Marontate would later become good friends with Foss.

== Cactus Air Force ace ==
Marine pilots with VMF-121 arrived at Henderson Field in Guadalcanal in October 1942. First Lieutenant Marontate arrived at the airfield on October 9. Marontate saw his first combat action the next day, when he helped escort friendly dive bombers which attacked Japanese ships. Marontate quickly distinguished himself as one of the top fighter aces of the squadron, racking up nine aerial victories during his first tour with the Cactus Air Force. In mid-November, VMF-121 was relieved and went to Sydney, Australia for rest.

VMF-121 returned to Guadalcanal for their second tour in late December. On January 5, 1943, First Lieutenant Marontate led his section to break up a Japanese dive bomber attack on American ships. Marontate downed two dive bombers and one A6M Zero, bringing his number of victories to twelve.

== Death ==
On January 15, First Lieutenant Marontate and other members of VMF-121 were escorting dive bombers near Vella Lavella in the New Georgia Islands. Marontate shot down at least one Japanese Zero, his 13th and final kill of the war, before he himself was shot down. Joe Foss observed Marontate's F4F Wildcat falling out of the sky with a missing wing. Foss later learned that Marontate was involved in a mid-air collision with a Zero and had bailed out of his plane. Marontate was listed as missing in action, and was declared dead in February 1945.

William P. Marontate's body was never recovered. For his superb airmanship during the Guadalcanal campaign, Marontate was posthumously awarded the Navy Cross and promoted to captain. Marontate's name is inscribed on a memorial in the Manila American Cemetery in the Philippines.

== Awards and decorations ==
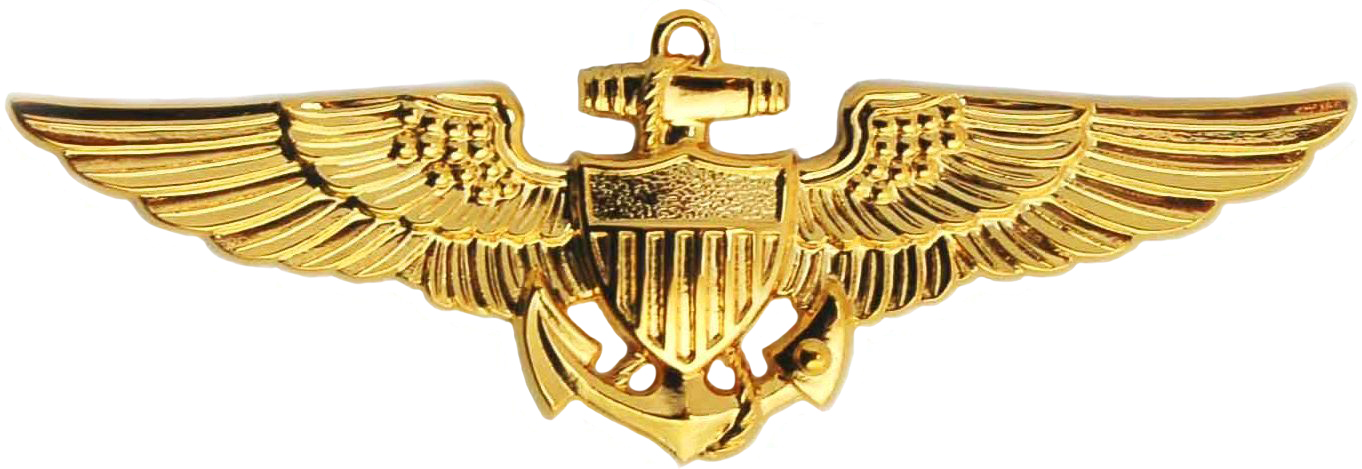

Naval Aviator Badge
Navy Cross	Purple Heart	Air Medal w/ three 5/16" gold stars
American Campaign Medal	Asiatic–Pacific Campaign Medal w/ 3/16" bronze star	World War II Victory Medal

=== Navy Cross citation ===

First Lieutenant William Pratt Marontate
U.S. Marine Corps

The President of the United States of America takes pride in presenting the Navy Cross (Posthumously) to First Lieutenant William Pratt Marontate, United States Marine Corps Reserve, for extraordinary heroism and distinguished service in the line of his profession while serving as a Pilot in Marine Fighting Squadron ONE HUNDRED TWENTY-ONE (VMF-121), Marine Air Group FOURTEEN (MAG-14), FIRST Marine Aircraft Wing, in aerial combat against enemy Japanese forces in the Solomon Islands Area during a period of intense enemy activity from 9 October 1942 to 15 January 1943. During his first tour of duty in this area, First Lieutenant Marontate, as pilot of a fighter plane, led his four-plane division of the flight with such aggressive skill that fifty-six enemy aircraft were destroyed, he personally accounting for nine hostile aircraft. On 5 January leading a section of fighter planes as protection for a task force, he gallantly fought off enemy aircraft which were attacking our vessels and brought down two Japanese dive bombers and one Zero. While escorting a striking force of dive bombers on January 15 in an attack against enemy shipping off New Georgia Island, he succeeded in destroying at least one enemy aircraft before he was shot down by Japanese fighter planes. His superb airmanship, great courage, and fearless devotion to duty were in keeping with the highest traditions of the United States Naval Service.
