= Marine Air Control Squadron 24 =

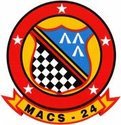
- MACS-24 Insignia
- Active: Oct 15, 1949 - present
- Country: United States
- Branch: United States Marine Corps
- Type: Aviation Command & Control
- Role: Aerial surveillance & Air traffic control
- Part of: Marine Air Control Group 48; 4th Marine Aircraft Wing
- Garrison/HQ: Virginia Beach, Virginia
- Nickname: Earthquake
- Engagements: Operation Desert Storm; Operation Iraqi Freedom; Operation Enduring Freedom

Commanders
- Current commander: LtCol D. F. DiToro

Marine Air Control Squadron 24 (MACS-24) is a reserve United States Marine Corps aviation command and control squadron. The squadron provides aerial surveillance and air traffic control for the Marine Forces Reserve. The squadron is headquartered in Virginia Beach, Virginia with an Air Traffic Control detachment at Naval Air Station Joint Reserve Base Fort Worth, Texas. MACS-24 falls under the command of Marine Air Control Group 48 and the 4th Marine Aircraft Wing.

== Mission ==
The support of air control operations as directed by the Commanding General, Marine Forces Reserve and to provide air surveillance, control of aircraft and ground-based air defense assets, and to provide navigational assistance to itinerant friendly aircraft in support of the Fleet Marine Force.

== History ==
Marine Ground Control Intercept Squadron 24 (MGCIS-24) was commissioned on October 15, 1949 at Naval Air Station Anacostia, Washington D.C. On March 1, 1954 that squadron was redesignated as Marine Air Control Squadron 24 (MACS-24). In October 1961 the squadron relocated to Andrews Air Force Base. In 1965, as part of the redesign of the Marine Corps Reserve, MACS-24 joined the 4th Marine Aircraft Wing. in January 1967, MACS-24 was assigned to Marine Air Control Group 48.

== See also ==
- Organization of the United States Marine Corps
- List of United States Marine Corps aviation support units
