= Camp Mujuk =

US military base in Pohang, South Korea

- Pohang in South Korea
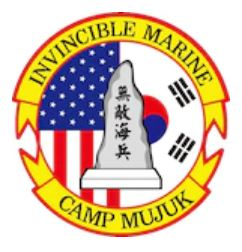
- Camp Mujuk logo

Location
- Coordinates: 35.95769°N 129.42821°E

Site history
- Built: 1980

Korean name
- Hangul: 캠프 무적
- RR: Kaempeu Mujeok
- MR: K'aemp'ŭ Mujŏk

Camp Mujuk (Korean: 캠프 무적) is a US Marine Corps base located in Segye-ri, Ocheon-eup, Nam District, Pohang, North Gyeongsang Province, South Korea. It is a unit that provides the facilities and supplies necessary for the training and operations of U.S. Marine Corps expeditionary forces.

== History ==
Constructed in 1980, it houses a U.S. Marine Corps unit of brigade size. In 2009, a 410,000-square-meter area of Camp Mujuk was newly designated as a military facility protection zone.

== See Also ==
- United States Marine Corps Forces, Korea
