= Marine Tactical Air Command Squadron 48 =

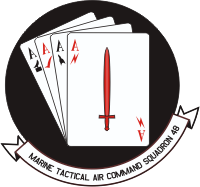
- MTACS-48 Insignia
- Active: 1 Sep 1967 – present
- Country: United States
- Branch: United States Marine Corps
- Role: Aviation Combat Element Command Post
- Size: Squadron
- Part of: Marine Air Control Group 48; 4th Marine Aircraft Wing
- Garrison/HQ: Naval Station Great Lakes, Illinois
- Motto: Keep Charging

Commanders
- Current commander: LtCol Brad Witham

Marine Tactical Air Command Squadron 48 (MTACS-48) is a reserve aviation command and control unit of the United States Marine Corps based at Naval Station Great Lakes, Illinois. The squadron provides personnel and equipment for establishing the 4th Marine Aircraft Wings tactical headquarters and command post. It currently falls under the command of Marine Air Control Group 48 and is the last active MTACS in the Marine Corps due to reorganization as part of Force Design 2030.

== Mission ==
Provide equipment, maintenance, and operations for the Tactical Air Command Center (TACC) of the Aviation Combat Element (ACE), as a component of the Marine Air-Ground Task Force (MAGTF). Equip, man, operate, and maintain the Current Operations section of the TACC. Provide and maintain a facility for the TACC Future Operations Section; and install and maintain associated automated systems.

== History ==
Marine Tactical Air Command Squadron 48 (MTACS-48) was activated on 1 September 1967 at Naval Air Station Glenview, Illinois as Headquarters and Headquarters Squadron 48 (H&HS-48), Marine Air Control Group 48, 4th Marine Aircraft Wing. The squadron was re-designated in on 1 May 1993 as Marine Tactical Air Command Squadron 48 (MTACS-48). The squadron relocated to Highwood, Illinois in 1995 and again in 2001 to their current location at Naval Station Great Lakes.

Since the September 11, 2001 attacks elements of MTACS-48 have mobilized to support Operation Iraqi Freedom in Iraq and Operation Enduring Freedom in Afghanistan.

== Unit awards ==
Since the beginning of World War II, the United States military has honored various units for extraordinary heroism or outstanding non-combat service. This information is compiled by the United States Marine Corps History Division and is certified by the Commandant of the Marine Corps.

Streamer	Award	Year(s)	Additional Info
A green streamer with red, gold, and blue horizontal stripes and four stars in the center	Meritorious Unit Commendation Streamer with four Bronze Stars	1983–1986, 1991, 1994–1995, 1997–1998	
A red streamer with a horizontal gold stripe and three bronze stars in the center	National Defense Service Streamer with two Bronze Stars	1961–1974, 1990–1995, 2001–present	Vietnam War, Gulf War, war on terrorism
	Global War on Terrorism Expeditionary Streamer	2001–present	
A blue streamer with yellow, red, and white horizontal stripes	Global War on Terrorism Service Streamer	2001–present	

== See also ==
- United States Marine Corps Aviation
- Organization of the United States Marine Corps
- List of United States Marine Corps aviation support units
