= United States Marine Corps Forces, Korea =

Marine Corps service component of U.S. Forces Korea

United States Marine Corps Forces Korea
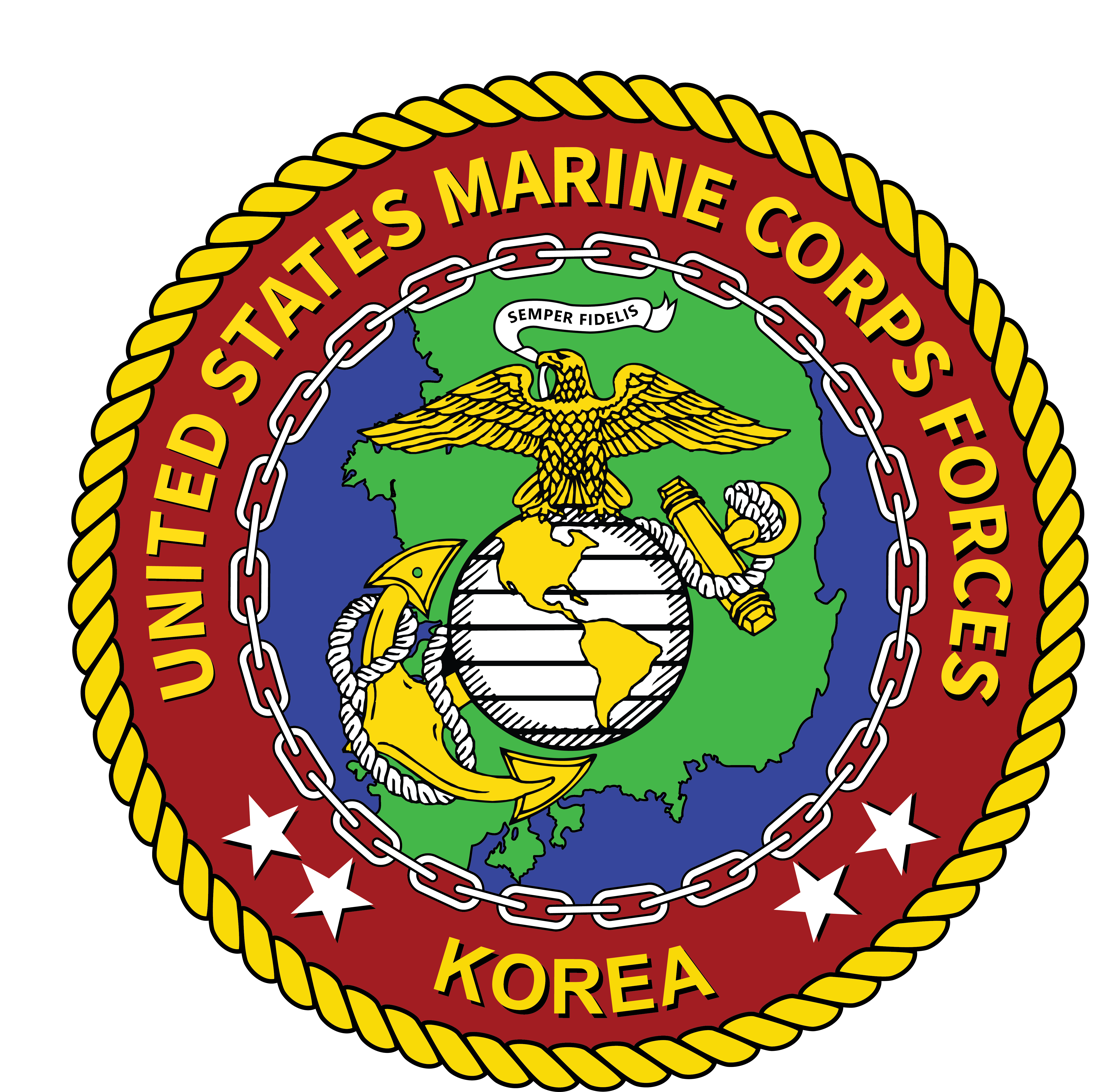
- Founded: 1 June 1995
- Country: United States
- Branch: United States Marine Corps
- Part of: Marine Corps Forces Pacific
- Garrison/HQ: Camp Humphreys; Pyeongtaek, South Korea

Commanders
- Commander: Maj Gen Valerie A. Jackson
- Sergeant Major: Sgt Maj Ismael G. Bamba

The U.S. Marine Corps Forces Korea (abbreviated MARFORK) is the Marine Corps service component of United States Forces Korea and the United Nations Command. MARFORK is responsible for commanding Marines assigned to the USFK and the UNC, advising the two commands on the proper support and employment of Marine forces, and contributing to the defense of the Republic of Korea with the deployment of Marines. The head of MARFORK is also the representative of the U.S. Marine Corps to the Commandant of the Republic of Korea Marine Corps. It is headquartered at Camp Humphreys, South Korea.

== History ==
Marines were present during the U.S. Expedition to Korea in 1871. During the Korean War in 1950, the 1st Marine Division participated in the U.S. campaign. Marines were deployed to Korea at the request of General Douglas MacArthur, the U.S. Commander-in-Chief in the Far East, and fought in the Battle of Inchon and the Battle of Chosin Reservoir.

Headquarters Marine Corps Forces Korea was activated on 1 June 1995 as part of Fleet Marine Force, Pacific (FMFPAC). MARFORK is tasked with coordinating and planning all operational, training, and logistical issues related to Marines in South Korea during peacetime. In the event of a war, U.S. Marine Corps Forces, Pacific (MARFORPAC) will provide Marine Forces Korea with a full staff for military operations, and MARFORK would oversee the Korean theater of operations. The Commander of MARFORK is also the Commander of the Combined Marine Forces Command (COMCMFC), and is the U.S. Marine Corps representative to the head of the Republic of Korea Marine Corps (ROKMC), as well as representing the Commander of MARFORPAC. MARFORK assists and provides Marine capabilities to the Commander, U.S. Forces Korea and United Nations Command.

Between 1995 and at least 2001, the commander of U.S. Marine Corps Forces, Pacific (MARFORPAC) was also the commander-designate of U.S. Marine Corps Forces, Korea (MARFORK). The title was nominally held by the commander of MARFORPAC, and he was represented in South Korea by a small staff. In the event of a war, the MARFORPAC commander and much of his staff would relocate to South Korea and would form the Combined Marine Forces Command, together with the ROKMC leadership.

== List of commanders ==
Commander, MARFORPAC; Commanding General, FMFPAC; Commander, MARCENT (designate); and Commander, MARFORK (designate):

- Jefferson D. Howell (1995–1998)
- Carlton W. Fulford Jr. (1998–1999)
- Frank Libutti (1999–2001)
- Earl B. Hailston (2001–2003)

Commander, MARFORK:

- Timothy E. Donovan (2003–2004)
- John F. Goodman (2004–2005)
- Duane D. Thiessen (2005–2007)
- Charles M. Gurganus (2010–2011)
- Michael Regner (2011–2013)
- Christopher S. Owens (2013–2015)
- Robert F. Hedelund (2015–2017)
- James W. Lukeman (2017–2018)
- Patrick J. Hermesmann (2018–2019)
- Bradley S. James (2019–2022)
- Brian N. Wolford (2022–2023)
- William E. Souza III (2023–2025)
- Valerie A. Jackson (2025–present)

== See also ==
- United States Marine Corps Forces, Pacific
- Camp Mujuk
