= Intelligence Support Battalion =

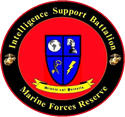
- ISB's insignia
- Active: 8 February 2003 – present
- Country: United States
- Branch: United States Marine Corps
- Type: Intelligence
- Part of: Force Headquarters Group
- Garrison/HQ: New Orleans, Louisiana
- Engagements: Operation Iraqi Freedom; Operation Enduring Freedom; Operation Inherent Resolve

Commanders
- Current commander: LtCol Stephen M. Houghton
- Notable commanders: LtCol Brendan Egan; LtCol Chris Cheung; Mark A. Cunningham

The Intelligence Support Battalion (ISB) is the battalion in the United States Marine Corps which provides military intelligence for the Marine Forces Reserve. It is part of the Force Headquarters Group. They have detachments located throughout the United States and Marines from this unit have deployed all over the world in numerous billets supporting the war on terror.

== Mission ==
Provide a larger force intelligence capability within the Marine Corps reserves in accordance with the Department of Defense (DoD) initiative to reshape the total force. The ISB provides over 200 new Select Marine Corps Reserve (SMCR) intelligence Marines through three companies of trained intelligence specialists to support Marine Corps Intelligence Activity (MCIA) in DoD Intelligence Production Program (DoDIPP) requirements. During peace time, reservists from the ISB drill at 12 of the 27 Joint Reserve Intelligence Centers (JRICs). During times of contingencies or crises, these Marines can be activated in place, providing reach-back capability, or can be deployed with their active duty counterparts.

== Subordinate units ==
In 2024, the battalion comprised

- Headquarters – New Orleans, Louisiana
- Battlespace Surveillance Company – Mobile, Alabama
- Company A – San Diego, California
- Company B – Washington, DC
- Direct Support Company — Aurora, Colorado
- Operations Company — Aurora, Colorado

== History ==
=== 4th Sensor Control and Management Platoon ===
The 4th Sensor Control and Management Platoon (SCAMP) was activated on 1 October 1986 and co-located in Mobile with 3rd Force Reconnaissance Company. In 1990, 4th SCAMP was mobilized in support of Operation Desert Shield/Desert Storm and in 1991 was demobilized.

=== Formation ===
On 23 December 2004, the Marine Corps published MCBUL 5400 and officially established ISB as an operational unit. For this to occur, the Marine Corps created 286 new Active Component, Active Reserve (AR), and Reserve Component intelligence billets and added them to the original 161 Reserve Component billets, resulting in a completely transformed intelligence organization of 459 Marines.

Since its operational establishment, ISB has provided intelligence production support to a variety of customers throughout the Intelligence Community (IC) and supported numerous operational manning requirements overseas with intelligence analysts, Ground Sensor Marines, and Counterintelligence/Human Source Intelligence (CI/HUMINT) Marines.

On 1 October 2019, the Marine Corps published MCBUL 5400 that designated ISB into six functioning companies to align with its active-duty component. Those companies include Alpha Company, Bravo Company, Battlespace Surveillance Company, Headquarters Company, Direct Support and Operations Company.

== Notable veterans ==
In 2012, Major General Mark A. Cunningham was assigned as the Commander for Bravo Company, Intelligence Support Battalion (ISB) in Colorado. He later became the Commanding Officer of ISB in 2015 and the Director of Marine Corps Intelligence in June 2025.
