= Burke W. Whitman =

United States Marine Corps general

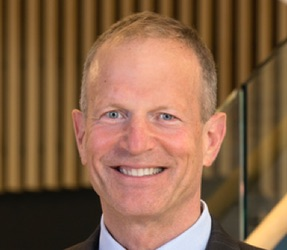
- Burke W. Whitman
- Military career
- Allegiance: United States of America
- Branch: United States Marine Corps
- Rank: Major General
- Commands: United States Marine Corps Reserve; 4th Marine Division; 25th Marine Regiment; 4th Reconnaissance Battalion
- Awards: Parachutist Badge; Naval Aviation Observer Badge; Rifle Expert Badge; Pistol Sharpshooter Badge; Distinguished Service Medal; Defense Superior Service Medal; Legion of Merit (2); Bronze Star Medal; Combat Action Ribbon (2); Presidential Unit Citation

Burke W. Whitman is a chief executive, board director, and former United States Marine Corps general. He has served as both a Fortune 500 company CEO and a US Marine commanding general.

== Business ==
Whitman is Chief Executive of Colmar Holdings, which provides capital and governance to enterprises committed to the common good. He is also a member of the Board of Directors of Amicus Therapeutics, Inc. Announces Board and Committees Changes, effective April 27, 2026 | MarketScreener Omega Healthcare Investors (NYSE: OHI), a global health and real estate company which invests capital in the future of senior care.

Previously, he served as CEO, CFO, and President of four nationwide companies, two of them Fortune 500, all successfully sold. In reverse chronology, he was CEO of Health Management (NYSE Fortune 500); founding CFO of Triad Hospitals (NYSE Fortune 500); founding President of Deerfield Healthcare (private); and Vice President of Almost Family (Nasdaq). Earlier he was an investment banker with Morgan Stanley. Reserve Forces Policy Board > Board Biographies > whitman

== Civil Society ==
Whitman serves national missions in education, defense, and health. He serves or has served on the board of directors of the Marine Corps Heritage Foundation, the Board of Trustees of The Lovett School, the Board of Directors of the Federation of American Hospitals, the Board of Directors of the Toys for Tots Foundation (a Forbes 100 charity), the Board of Visitors of Marine Corps University, the Founders Group of the National Museum of the Marine Corps, and the Reserve Forces Policy Board which advises the Secretary of Defense. He sponsors service leadership programs for students, and has given the commencement address at The Lovett School. He has delivered service addresses at Dartmouth College, Harvard Business School, and the Union League Club of New York.

== National Service ==
Concurrently through 2018, Whitman served as a Major General and the senior reserve officer of the U.S. Marine Corps, capping three decades of uniformed service, including a dozen years on active duty, with multiple combat deployments, tours in the Pentagon, and command at every level. As an infantry officer, he conducted seven deployments and commanded platoons, companies, 4th Reconnaissance Battalion, and 25th Marine Regiment. As a general, he was recalled to active duty, led three more deployments, served as the Commanding General of Marine Forces Reserve and the 4th Marine Division, and was tapped by the Secretary of Defense to serve as the Department’s Uniformed Spokesperson. Following completion of active duty in 2018, he retired as the senior reserve officer in order to return to civilian service.

== Early life and education ==
Whitman holds masters degrees in business, strategy, and ministry. He is a graduate of Harvard Business School (MBA), the Army War College (MSS), and Nashotah House Theological Seminary (MM 2021). He earned a BA from Dartmouth College on a scholarship, where he was a member of the rugby team and Sphinx Senior Society. Reared in Atlanta, he earned a diploma from The Lovett School.

== Awards ==
Dartmouth College awarded him its first annual James Wright Award for Distinguished Service, named for a president of the college and presented to an alumnus whose “lifetime exemplifies the ideals of service, college, and country.” Dartmouth Alumni Magazine featured a cover article on him which explored the commonalities between his business and military service leadership.

Institutional Investor Magazine named him a repeat Best CFO and Best CEO. The Washington Examiner reported on its editorial page that he was worth $580 million to corporate shareholders based on stock market reaction to the announcement of his appointment as CEO. Fortune Magazine recognized Triad as the fastest growing Fortune 500 company in earnings per share (EPS) during the period he was CFO.

The United States of America awarded him the Distinguished Service Medal, Combat Action Ribbons, Presidential Unit Citation, and other military decorations.

Military awards::

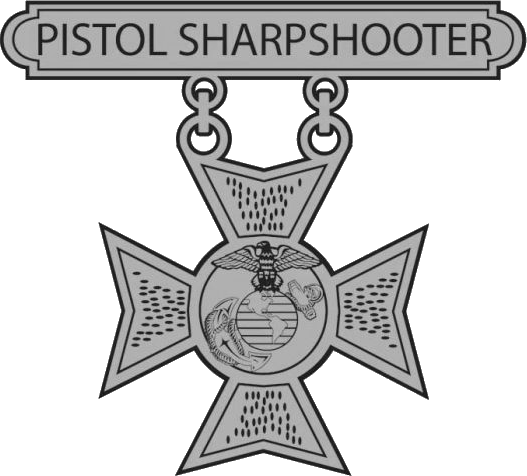
Parachutist Badge
Naval Aviation Observer Badge
Rifle Expert Badge
Pistol Sharpshooter Badge

- Distinguished Service Medal
- Defense Superior Service Medal
- Legion of Merit with gold star device
- Bronze Star Medal
- Defense Meritorious Service Medal
- Meritorious Service Medal with gold star device
- Navy & Marine Corps Commendation Medal
- Combat Action Ribbon with gold star device
- Presidential Unit Citation
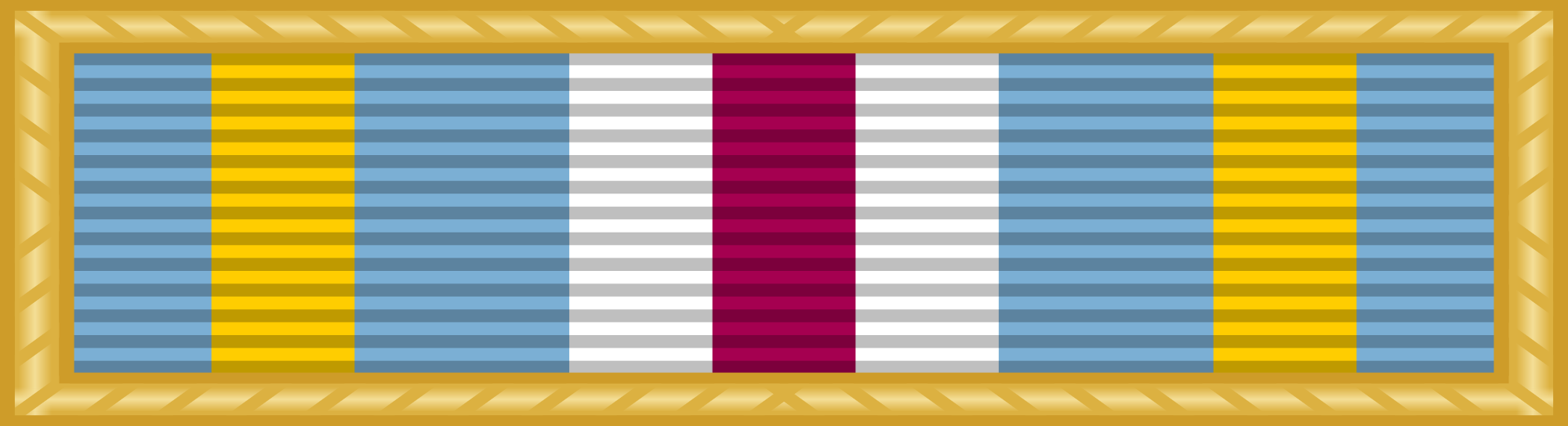
- Joint Meritorious Unit Award
- Navy Unit Commendation
- Navy Meritorious Unit Commendation
- Selected Marine Corps Reserve Medal with four bronze stars
- National Defense Service Medal with bronze star device
- Armed Forces Expeditionary Medal
- Afghanistan Campaign Medal with four bronze stars
- Iraq Campaign Medal with one bronze star
- Global War on Terrorism Service Medal
- Korean Defense Service Medal
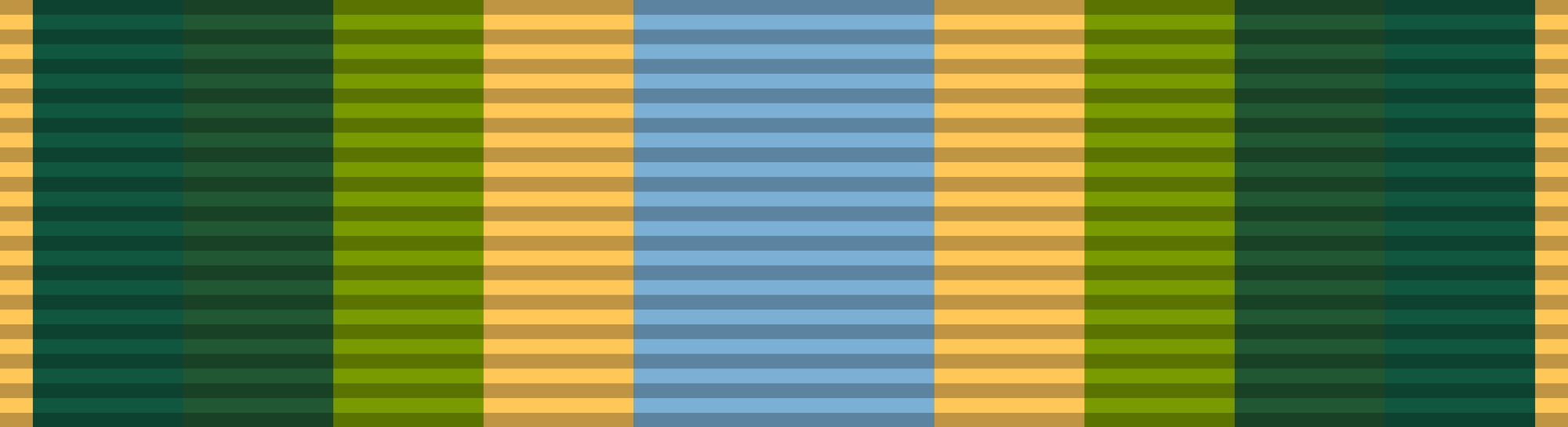
- Armed Forces Service Medal
- Sea Service Deployment Ribbon with three bronze stars
- Reserve Forces Medal with bronze hourglass, letter M, and numeral 3
- NATO Medal with one bronze star

Joint Chiefs of Staff Identification Badge
