= Marine Wing Communications Squadron 48 =

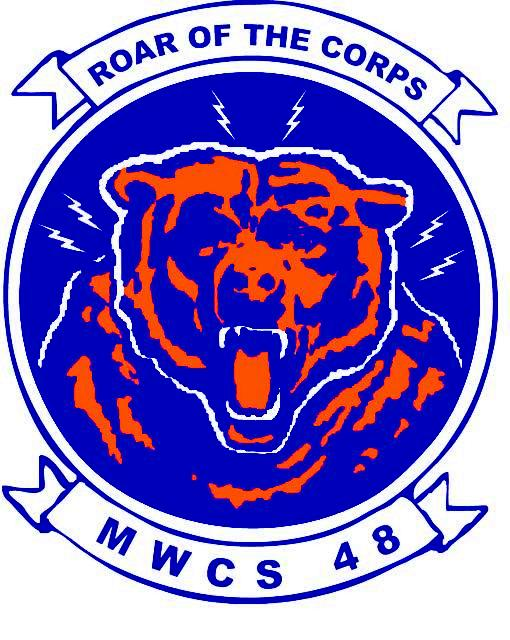
- MWCS-48 Insignia; Courtesy of www.marines.mil
- Active: 10 April 1952 – present
- Country: United States of America
- Branch: United States Marine Corps
- Type: Aviation Command & Control
- Role: Communications
- Part of: Marine Air Control Group 48; 4th Marine Aircraft Wing
- Garrison/HQ: Naval Station Great Lakes
- Motto: "Roar of the Corps" Photos of the Squadron
- Engagements: Operation Desert Storm; Operation Iraqi Freedom

Commanders
- Current commander: LtCol Ira Benoy

Marine Wing Communications Squadron 48 (abbreviated as MWCS-48) is a communications squadron in the United States Marine Corps Reserve. As part of Marine Air Control Group 48, MWCS-48 provides expeditionary communications for the 4th Marine Aircraft Wing, the Aviation Combat Element of Marine Forces Reserve. They are based at Naval Station Great Lakes and their Forward Detachment is located at Marine Corps Air Station Miramar, California and falls under the command of Marine Air Control Group 48 and the 4th Marine Aircraft Wing.

== Mission ==
Provide expeditionary communications for the Air Combat Element (ACE) of a Marine Expeditionary Force (MEF), including of tasked-organized elements thereof.

== Tasks ==
- Provide for the effective command of subordinate elements.
- Assist in the systems planning and engineering of ACE communications; and install, operate, and maintain expeditionary communications for command and control of the MEF ACE.
- Provide operational System Control Centers, as required, to coordinate communication functions internally and externally to the ACE.
- Provide collaboration and repair facility for all ground common Test Measurement Diagnostic Equipment (TMDE) in the Marine Aircraft Wing (MAW).
- Provide maintenance support for Ground Common Communications Equipment in the MAW.
- Provide the digital backbone communications support for the ACE Command Element (CE), forward operating bases, and Marine Air Command and Control System (MACCS) agencies for up to two airfields per detachment.
- Provide tactical, automated switching, and telephone services for the ACE CE, and Tactical Air Command Center (TACC).
- Provide electronic message distribution for the ACE CE, primary MACCS agencies, and tenant units.
- Provide external, single-channel radio and radio retransmission communications support for ACE operations, as required.
- Provide deployed Wide Area Network, and deployed Local Area Network server support for the ACE CE, and primary MACCS agencies.
- Provide the Support Cryptographic Site (SCS), for all Ground Common and MACCS assigned Communication Security Equipment within the ACE.
- Plan and coordinate individual and unit training, as required to qualify subordinate detachments for tactical deployment and combat operations.

== Formation ==
The squadron was originally activated on 10 April 1952 in Chicago, Illinois as the 2nd Air Naval Gunfire Liaison Company (2nd ANGLICO) of the Marine Corps Reserve.

== The 1950s ==
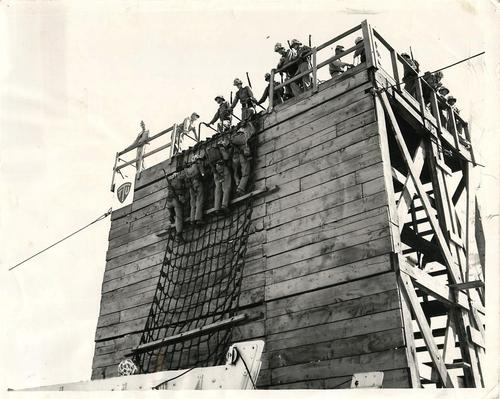
Marines from MWCS-48 (then-2nd ANGLICO) practice "dry net" training on a mock Navy attack transport and landing craft in Coronado, CA, 1953.

=== Name changes and early years ===
On 15 May 1957 they were redesignated the Air Naval Gunfire Liaison Company, 2nd Communication Support Battalion. Later that year on 1 November they again changed names, this time to the 2nd Communication Support Battalion. The 1960s saw more name redesignations to 5th Communication Battalion in 1962 and Marine Wing Communication Squadron 4 on 1 May 1962. At this time they were also transferred to the 4th Marine Aircraft Wing.

== The 1960s ==
=== The Vietnam War ===
MWCS-48 was not deployed to fight in Vietnam, but the war profoundly affected the character of the Squadron; better educated reservists began to fill the Squadron, attempting to escape the draft. Many of the Officers and Staff Non Commissioned Officers were Vietnam Veterans.

== The 1970s ==
=== Movement and Reassignment ===
On 1 July 1971 the squadron was redesignated to its present name, MWCS-48. An additional Squadron was formed, Marine Wing Communications Training Squadron 407 (MWCTS-407). This Squadron was composed of the four platoons that would have normally been assigned to the Marine Air Base Squadron of each one of the Marine Air Groups. The theory was that they would receive better training by consolidating the platoons in one unit. There were subordinate units in El Toro, CA, Alameda, CA, Willow Grove, PA, and Glenview, IL.

The Squadron was located in the City of Chicago just south of White Sox Park on 35th Street in an old tank factory, now used as a gymnasium for the Chicago Police Department. This large red brick building contained a very large drill deck where training on equipment could be conducted.

Equipment in the late 1960s and 1970s included AN/TRC-75 and TSC-15 HF Radios, MRC-62 and TRC-27 Multichannel equipment, and SB-22 and SB 86 Switchboards and EE-8 and TA-312 telephones. Later in the 1970s the unit transitioned to more modern equipment, including MRC-135s and TRC-166 and TRC-97.

In 1974 both Squadrons moved from Chicago to Naval Air Station Glenview, Illinois.

MWCTS-407 was merged into MWCS-48 in 1975. There are three active duty Communication Squadrons in the Marine Corps, MWCS-18, MWCS-28, and MWCS-38, and one in Reserve, MWCS-48. They each support a Marine Air Wing, three active duty and one in Reserve.

The Squadron supported numerous exercises throughout the United States. The Squadron supported numerous Combined Arms Exercises (CAX) in 29 Palms, Weapons Training Instruction (WTI) in Yuma, Arizona, and exercises at Camp Pendleton, Camp Lejeune, Cherry Point, and Quantico.

The Exercise High Intercept at Cherry Point in 1985 was a high point, where electronic warfare was a principle portion of the exercise, and where Radio Battalion told the Squadron that they were the best unit that they had ever worked against. The Commanding General of 4th MAW commended the Squadron for these efforts.

The Squadron also developed "Fly Away" weekend comm exercises. A VMGR-234 Glenview C-130 would fly a detachment out to El Toro or Yuma or New Orleans. Two MRC-135 multichannel radio jeeps would be transported, driven to mountain tops in southern California, and multichannel radio links would be established. These fly away drills were excellent for morale. The unit also used HM-776 Huey Helicopters from Glenview, which was highly motivating for the troops.

The Squadron flew C-119 Flying Boxcars to Norfolk, VA on one long winter weekend for dry net training. The flying boxcar was the only multi engine military aircraft that would not fly if it lost one engine. The troops were given parachutes and instructed on how to use them if the order was given to jump from the airplane. The first plane did not have enough power to leave Glenview, so another one was obtained. The door was secured with a large leather strap, and the front wheel cranked up with a long lever. The weather was very bad nearly leading to a crash at Norfolk.

The unit specialized in long range difficult multichannel shots. The unit successfully established and operated shots between El Toro and 29 Palms and to Yuma Arizona, using MRC-135 jeeps on mountain tops. Two MRC-135 shots and a TRC-66 link would be established. The unit also used the Prudential building in downtown Chicago to relay information between the Joliet Arsena and NAS Glenview.

Officers and Staff NCO's attended numerous schools, including Landing Force Communications Planning in Coronado. Marine Amphibious Brigade Planning, NAB Coronado CA, Aviation Staff Planning Course, LFTCPAC Coronado CA, NATO Electronic Warfare Course at SHAPE Headquarters in Oberammergau, West Germany, Air Control Operations Course, LFTCLANT, BLT/RLT Operations Planning, LFTCLANT, Little Creek VA, Electronic Warfare Course conducted by the German Army at the German Army Signal School, Feldafing GDR.

== The 1980s ==
=== "Roar of the Corps" and bear logo ===
In 1988, MWCS-48 was adding detachments on the coasts. Andrew B. Davis, then a lieutenant colonel in command of the squadron, decided to create a new unit logo that would unify MWCS-48's detachments over their shared culture, honor MWCS-48's history in the Chicago area, and honor its history as one of the few units of US Marines headquartered in Illinois.

LtCol Davis contacted the Chicago Bears and requested to use their distinctive bear head logo as the MWCS-48 unit insignia in conjunction with the new unit motto "Roar of the Corps". This was during the excitement of the Mike Ditka years following the Bears victory at Super Bowl XX in 1986. (Note: While Davis' decision may seem unusual, it came only a few years after future Commandant Charles Krulak adopted the nickname "America's Battalion" for his unit, 3rd Battalion, 3rd Marines, from the Dallas Cowboys nickname "America's Team".) In November 1988, NFL Properties granted permission, provided that any unit patches or decals with the logo be given away rather than sold.

According to MWCS-48's official heraldry, the image of the bear denotes courage, dominance, and tumultuous noise. The lightning bolts emanating from the bear's mouth are symbols of communications and electronics (the tools of MWCS-48), and depict the volume of the bear's roar, symbolizing the clarity and volume of communications provided by the squadron. The motto, "Roar of the Corps", likewise gives emphasis to the boldness and skill by which MWCS-48 performs its communications mission in the control of aircraft and missiles.

MWCS-48 is one of only two units in the entire US military authorized by NFL Properties to use a team logo in its unit heraldry. (Note: The other is HSL-60, based in Jacksonville, FL.)

In April 1980, Members of MWCS-48 were within 48 hrs of being called into operation Eagle Claw in Iran. A Navy CH-47 Helicopter flown by Marines who had trained with MWCS-48 personnel in Yuma, Arizona, collided with a c-130 on the only runway that was useable. The American hostages were to be rescued by special ops. and flown out. After the Aborted mission we were called to stand down, and disregard.  No one talked about it afterword. Submitted by Sgt. Al Hoffman MWCS-48 NAS Glenview 1976–1981.  Semper Fi

== The 1990s ==
=== The Gulf War ===
In February to June 1991 the Squadron was mobilized in support of Operation Desert Shield and Desert Storm in Southwest Asia. Approximately ½ of the Squadron was activated while the remainder were prepared for and within days of mobilization. Squadron Marines served in North Carolina, Norway, and in the Persian Gulf. The unit worked with MWCS-28 and performed very well.

=== "Firsts" ===
During the 1990s, MWCS-48 established itself as the premier communications unit in the Marine Corps Reserve through a series of "firsts". They were the first unit in the Marine Corps Reserve to field and successfully operate the MRC-142 multichannel radio. During the same period, they were the first unit in the Reserve to field and successfully operate the AN/TTC-42 digital telephone switch. Yet perhaps more significantly, in 1993 MWCS-48 became the first unit in the Marine Corps, active or reserve, to receive fiber optic cable, and became the first unit to use it in support of a major combined arms exercise when they used it to support Enhanced Combined Arms Exercise (ECAX) 7/8 at Twentynine Palms.

=== Base closures and relocation ===
The Squadron was affected by the 1993 Base Realignment and Closure Commission, which closed down Glenview Naval Air Station. As a result, on 5–6 September 1995, the squadron moved again, this time to Fort Sheridan in Highwood, Illinois.

== The 2000s ==
=== Another relocation ===
Just six years after moving from Glenview Naval Air Station to Ft. Sheridan, MWCS-48 was relocated yet again. In November 2001, they moved to their present location at Naval Station Great Lakes. On 8 September 2007, the Marines of MACG-48 dedicated the training center the Gen Christian F. Schilt Marine Corps Reserve Training Center, after the Medal of Honor recipient and Illinois native.

=== Operation Iraqi Freedom ===
First time entire Squadron (MWCS-48) Mobilized. Squadron received the Presidential Unit Citation (PUC – MARADMIN 609/05) as subordinate unit to I MEF, from 21 Mar to 24 Apr 2003 under the Command of LtCol Kavin G Kowis.

== Unit awards ==
A unit citation or commendation is an award bestowed upon an organization for the action cited. Members of the unit who participated in said actions are allowed to wear on their uniforms the awarded unit citation. This information is compiled by the United States Marine Corps History Division and is certified by the Commandant of the Marine Corps. Marine Wing Communications Squadron 48 has been presented with the following awards:

Streamer	Award	Year(s)	Additional Info
	Meritorious Unit Commendation Streamer with three bronze stars	1983–1986, 1990–1991, 1994–1995, 1997–1998	
	National Defense Service Streamer with one bronze star	1991, 2001–present	Gulf War, war on terrorism
	Global War on Terrorism Expeditionary Streamer	2003	
	Global War on Terrorism Service Streamer	2001–present	

== Notable MWCS-48 Marines ==
- MGen Andrew B. Davis, commanded the Squadron from 1986–1989
- 1stSgt Henry White, Marine Corps League's Marine of the Year, 1978. Also the Marine Corps League's National Chaplain.

== See also ==
- United States Marine Corps Aviation
- Organization of the United States Marine Corps
- List of United States Marine Corps aviation support units

== Notes ==
=== Citations ===
* Sgt. Paul Divine, merrit. promo. from a 2-star General in 1980 while on ATD.  MWCS-48 Glenview IL.
  Submitted by fellow mwcs-48 Sgt. Al Hoffman Glenview Il.
