= Force Headquarters Group =

Command element of the U.S. Marine Corps Forces Reserve

Coordinates: 29°57′01″N 90°02′13″W

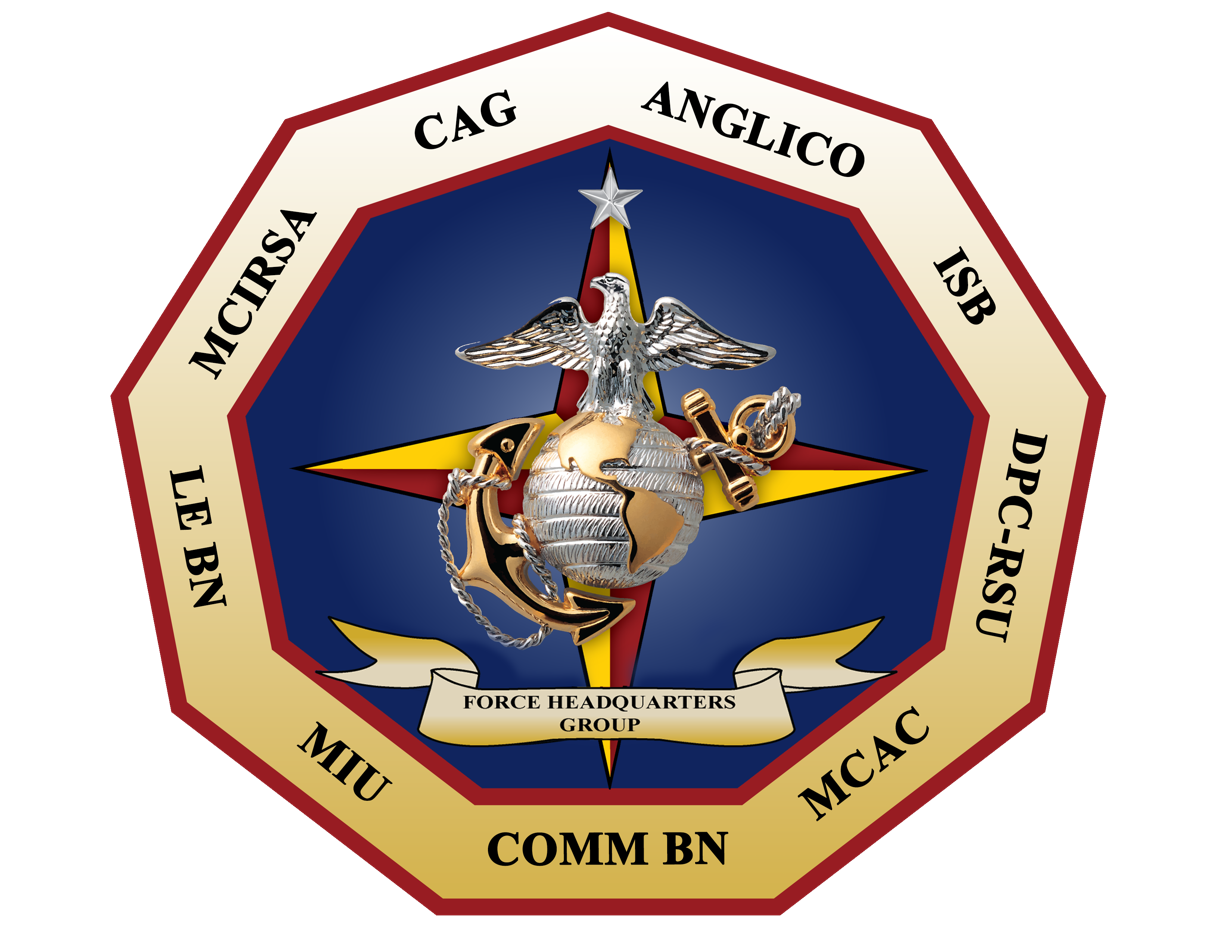
- Force Headquarters Group insignia
- Active: 2012-present
- Country: United States
- Allegiance: United States of America
- Branch: United States Marine Corps
- Type: Headquarters
- Part of: Marine Forces Reserve

The Force Headquarters Group (FHG) is a major subordinate command (MSC) of the United States Marine Corps based in New Orleans, Louisiana. It was established as a part of the command element for Marine Forces Reserve. It was activated on July 18, 2012, assuming command of six MARFORRES Force-level units: 3rd and 4th Air Naval Gunfire Liaison Companies, 3rd and 4th Civil Affairs Groups, 6th Communications Battalion and Intelligence Support Battalion.

Previously, these units reported to Lt. Gen. Steven Hummer, the commander of Marine Forces Reserve. As a result of the Commandant-directed Force Structure Review Group, the units were realigned under the new MSC to streamline the command and control process, making it more effective. General Hummer explained that as the Mobilization Command was relocated to New Orleans from Kansas City, a requirement for a Force-level headquarters group became evident.

The Group is planned to expand as future FSRG-directed unit activations and realignments are planned, including Marine Corps Individual Reserve Support Activity (formerly MOBCOM), which is responsible for the 57,000 Individual Ready Reserve Marines, as well as other units.

== Units ==
- Headquarters Battalion
- 1st Civil Affairs Group
- 3rd Civil Affairs Group
- 4th Civil Affairs Group
- 4th Law Enforcement Battalion
- 6th Communication Battalion
- Intelligence Support Battalion
- 3rd Air Naval Gunfire Liaison Company
- 4th Air Naval Gunfire Liaison Company
- 6th Air Naval Gunfire Liaison Company
- Marine Corps Advisor Company A (previously 2nd Civil Affairs Group)
- Marine Corps Advisor Company B
- Marine Innovation Unit
- Marine Corps Individual Reserve Support Activity
- Deployment Processing Command / Reserve Support Unit - East
- Deployment Processing Command / Reserve Support Unit - West
- Defensive Cyberspace Operations-Internal Defensive Measures
