= Keith Smith (general) =

American Marine Corps officer (1928–2012)

Keith A. Smith
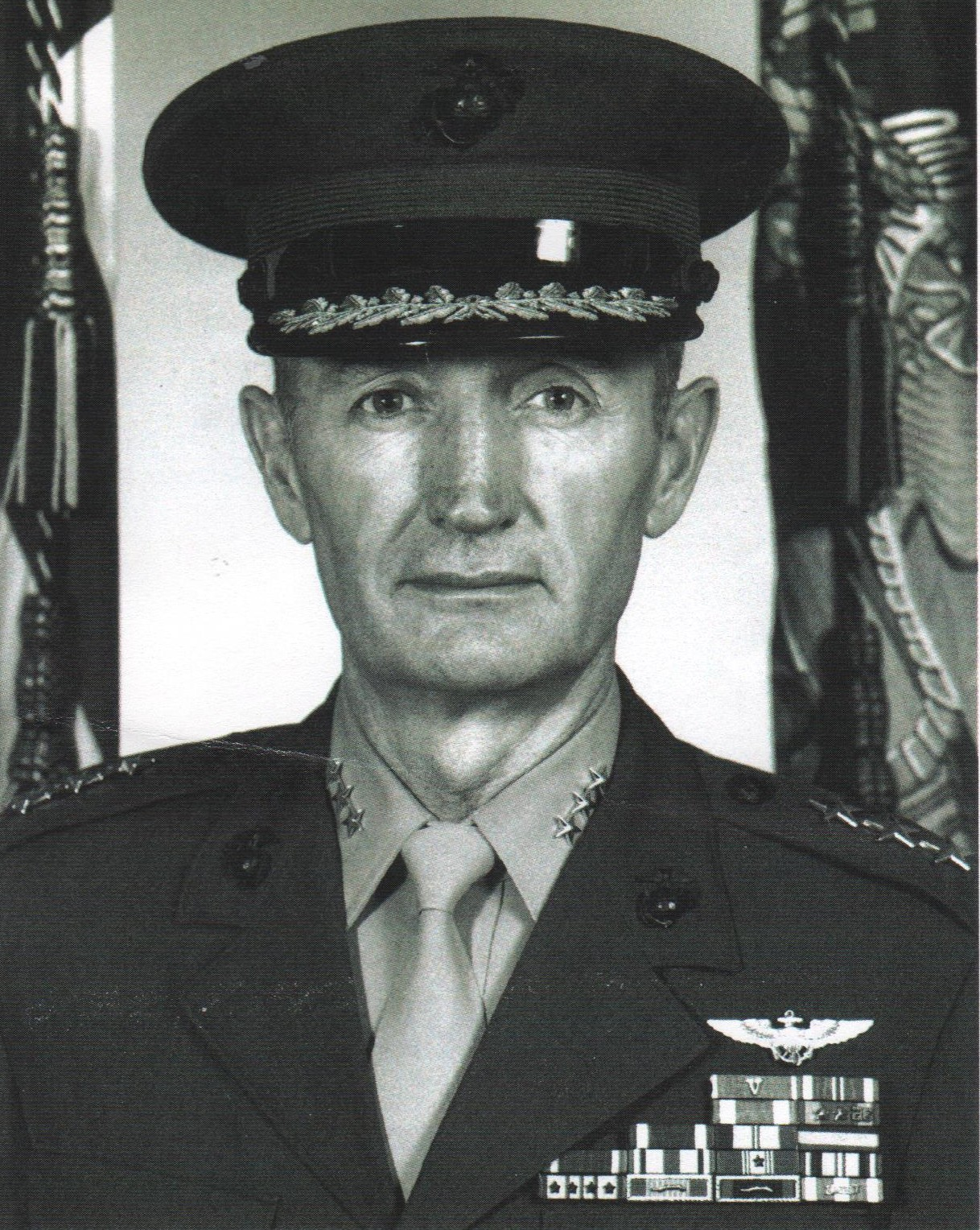
- Born: November 11, 1928; Cheney, Washington, U.S.
- Died: September 7, 2012 (aged 83); Vienna, Virginia, U.S.
- Military career
- Allegiance: United States
- Branch: United States Marine Corps
- Service years: 1952–1986
- Rank: Lieutenant general
- Commands: Deputy Commandant for Aviation

Keith A. Smith (November 11, 1928 – September 7, 2012) was a lieutenant general in the United States Marine Corps who served as Deputy Commandant for Aviation for the Marine Corps from 1 September 1984 to 29 April 1988. He was commissioned in 1952 and retired in 1988.

== Early life and career ==
Keith Alfred Smith was born on November 11, 1928, in Cheney, Washington to Thomas Clifford Smith and Julia Teresa Smith. His family were dairy farmers in Spokane County, Washington. He attended Cheney High School and Washington State University where he graduated in 1952 with a B.S. in agriculture. On May 12, 1951, he enlisted in the Marine Corps Reserve and was commissioned a second lieutenant on June 6, 1952. After completing the Basic School in Quantico, Virginia, Smith entered flight school at the Naval Air Station Pensacola, FL and was designated a Naval Aviator on May 12, 1954. Smith was awarded the Legion of Merit and the Distinguished Flying Cross for his service in the Vietnam War. Smith, for sometime before 1980, was the commanding general of Marine Corps Installations East, operating from Marine Corps Air Station Cherry Point. In 1980, as the Deputy Chief of Staff for Requirements and Programs, he appeared before the Committee on Armed Services of the United States House of Representatives to discuss the Marine Corps' battle readiness. Smith argued against cutting funding for the development of the McDonnell Douglas AV-8B Harrier II, and said it was important because its V/STOL capabilities meant it could land and takeoff from anywhere.

Smith was appointed the Deputy Commandant for Aviation on 1 September 1984, succeeding William H. Fitch; he left office on 29 April 1988, and was succeeded by Charles H. Pitman. In this role, he focused on reducing the accident rate and improving the full operating capability of Marine Corps aircraft. In 1987, he appeared before the Committee on Armed Services of the United States Senate to present the Navy's aircraft procurement budget and strategy, accompanying rear admirals Robert F. Dunn and Joseph Wilkinson. Smith also clashed with Alfred M. Gray Jr., the Commandant of the Marine Corps at the time, over control of unmanned aerial vehicles (UAVs) like the AAI RQ-2 Pioneer. Gray believed Ground Combat Elements should have control, while Smith advocated for Aviation Combat Element having control of UAVs. Smith retired as a lieutenant general in 1988.

== Personal life ==
Smith married Shirley Lee of Hoquiam, Washington in 1952. They had nine children, six boys and three girls. Their oldest son, Marine Captain Vincent Lee Smith, was killed in the terrorist attack on Marine barracks in Beirut, Lebanon on October 23, 1983. General Smith died on Friday, September 7, 2012, in Arlington, Virginia. He is buried at Quantico National Cemetery in Quantico, Virginia. Smith was survived by his wife, eight children, 17 grandchildren and one great-grandchild.

== Sources ==
- Kaufman, Roxanne M. (2012). 1912-2012, 100 Years of Marine Corps Aviation: An Illustrated History. Department of the Navy. ISBN 978-0-160-89343-8.
