= VMM-161 =

Marine Medium Tiltrotor Squadron 161
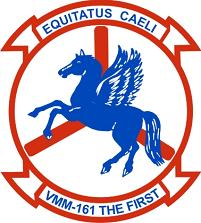
- New VMM-161 insignia
- Active: 15 January 1951 - present
- Country: United States
- Allegiance: United States of America
- Branch: United States Marine Corps
- Type: Medium-Lift Tiltrotor Squadron
- Role: Assault Support
- Part of: Marine Aircraft Group 16; 3rd Marine Aircraft Wing
- Garrison/HQ: Marine Corps Air Station Miramar
- Nickname: "Greyhawks"
- Mottos: "Equitatus Caeli" "Cavalry from the Sky" "The First, The Best"
- Tail Code: YR
- Engagements: Korean War; Vietnam War * Operation Starlite; Operation Desert Storm; Operation Enduring Freedom; Operation Iraqi Freedom

Commanders
- Current commander: LtCol Ryan Stevens
- Notable commanders: Keith B. McCutcheon

Marine Medium Tiltrotor Squadron 161 (VMM-161) is a United States Marine Corps tiltrotor squadron that operates the MV-22 Osprey. The squadron, known as the "Greyhawks", is based at Marine Corps Air Station Miramar, California and falls under the command of Marine Aircraft Group 16 (MAG-16) and the 3rd Marine Aircraft Wing (3rd MAW). The squadron has the distinction of being the first helicopter transport squadron in the world and regularly utilizes the phrase "The First, The Best".

Mission:

Provide assault support transport of combat troops, supplies and equipment during expeditionary, joint or combined operations. Be prepared for short-notice, worldwide employment in support of Marine Air-Ground Task Force operations.

== History ==
=== Korean War & the early 1960s ===
The squadron was commissioned on 15 January 1951, at Marine Corps Air Station El Toro, California, as Marine Helicopter Transport Squadron 161 (HMR-161), Air Fleet Marine Force Pacific. The squadron moved a month later to Marine Corps Air Facility Santa Ana, California to train on their new helicopter, the Sikorsky HRS-1. Except for the commanding officer, LtCol George Herring, most pilots in the squadron had flown fighters during World War II. In August 1951 the squadron deployed to South Korea and attached to the 1st Marine Aircraft Wing (1st MAW), where it operated in the central and the western fronts.

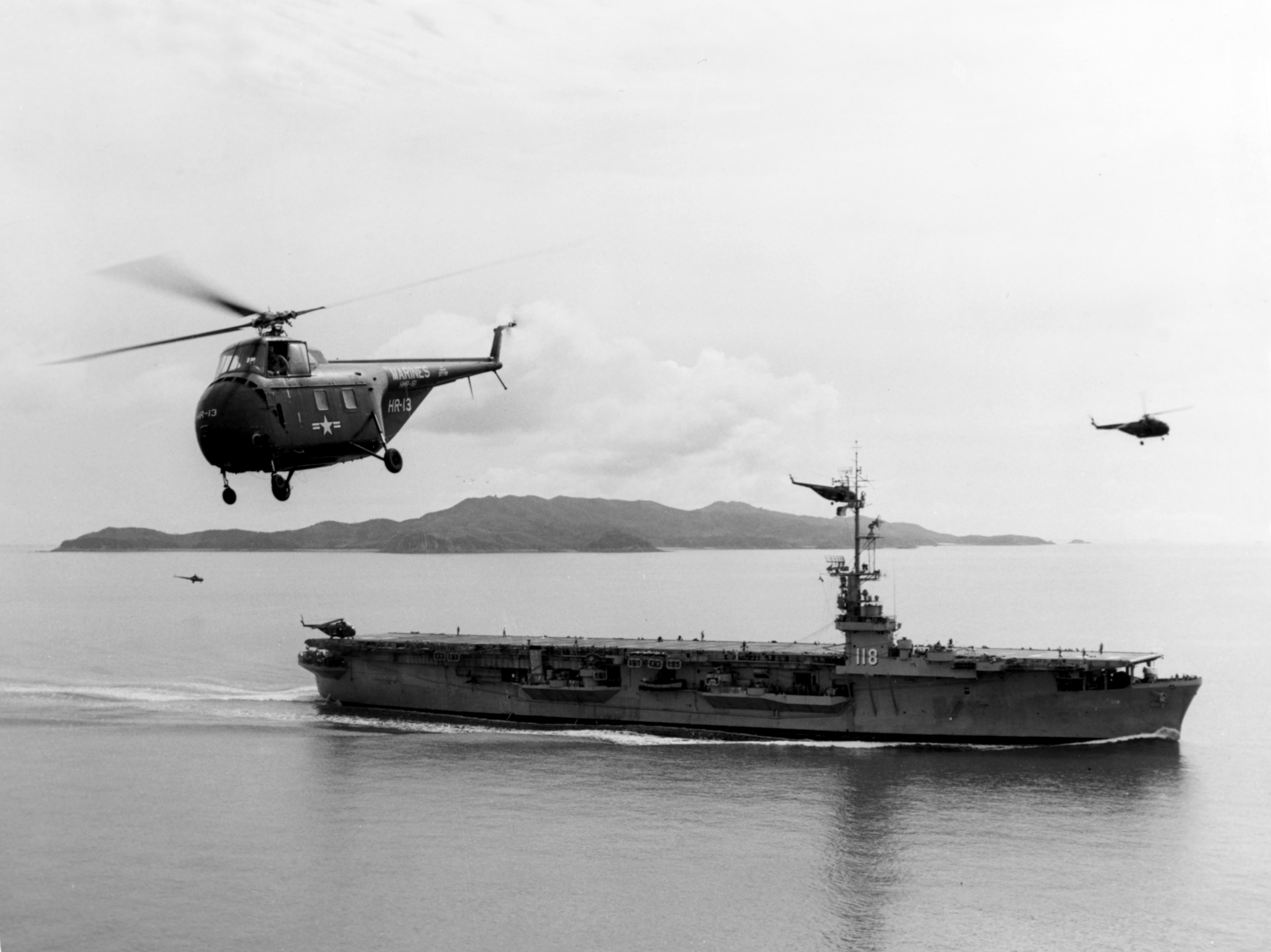
HRS-1s of HMR-161 flying from USS Sicily in September 1952.

HMR-161 successfully flew from the USS Sicily to test new concept of combining vertical envelopment with amphibious assault during Operation Marlex-5 off the coast of Inchon on 1 September 1952. While not the first ever ship to shore helicopter flight with Marines aboard, that having been done by HMR-162 during Operation Lex Baker off the coast of Southern California in February, 1952, it was the first on foreign shores. During the course of the Korean War, HMR-161 flew 16,538 hours during 18,607 sorties eventually accounting for over 60,000 troop movements and moving 7.5 million pounds of cargo. The squadron then participated in the defense of the Korean Demilitarized Zone (DMZ) from July 1953 to March 1955. The squadron then relocated that month to Marine Corps Air Station Kaneohe Bay, Hawaii, and attached to Marine Aircraft Group 13 (MAG 13). While in Hawaii, HMR-161 was redesignated on 31 December 1956, as Marine Helicopter Transport Squadron (Light) 161 (HMR(L)-161), MAG 13, 1st MAW. In May 1960, the Squadron received the new Sikorsky H-34 Seahorse.

On 1 February 1962, the unit was once again re-designated as Marine Medium Helicopter Squadron 161 (HMM-161), MAG 13, 1st Marine Brigade. On 3 October 1962, the squadron assisted NASA by recovering astronaut Wally Schirra and his Project Mercury capsule Sigma Seven out of the Pacific after a successful launch into space.

During 1963, Marine Medium Helicopter Squadron 161 (HMM-161) assisted in several biological warfare tests conducted under Project SHAD at Pearl Harbor, Kaneohe Naval Air Station and in the Pacific Ocean, near Oahu, Hawaii.

The rest of the early 1960s were spent conducting anti-guerrilla training in preparation for deployment to South Vietnam.

=== Vietnam War and the 1980s ===
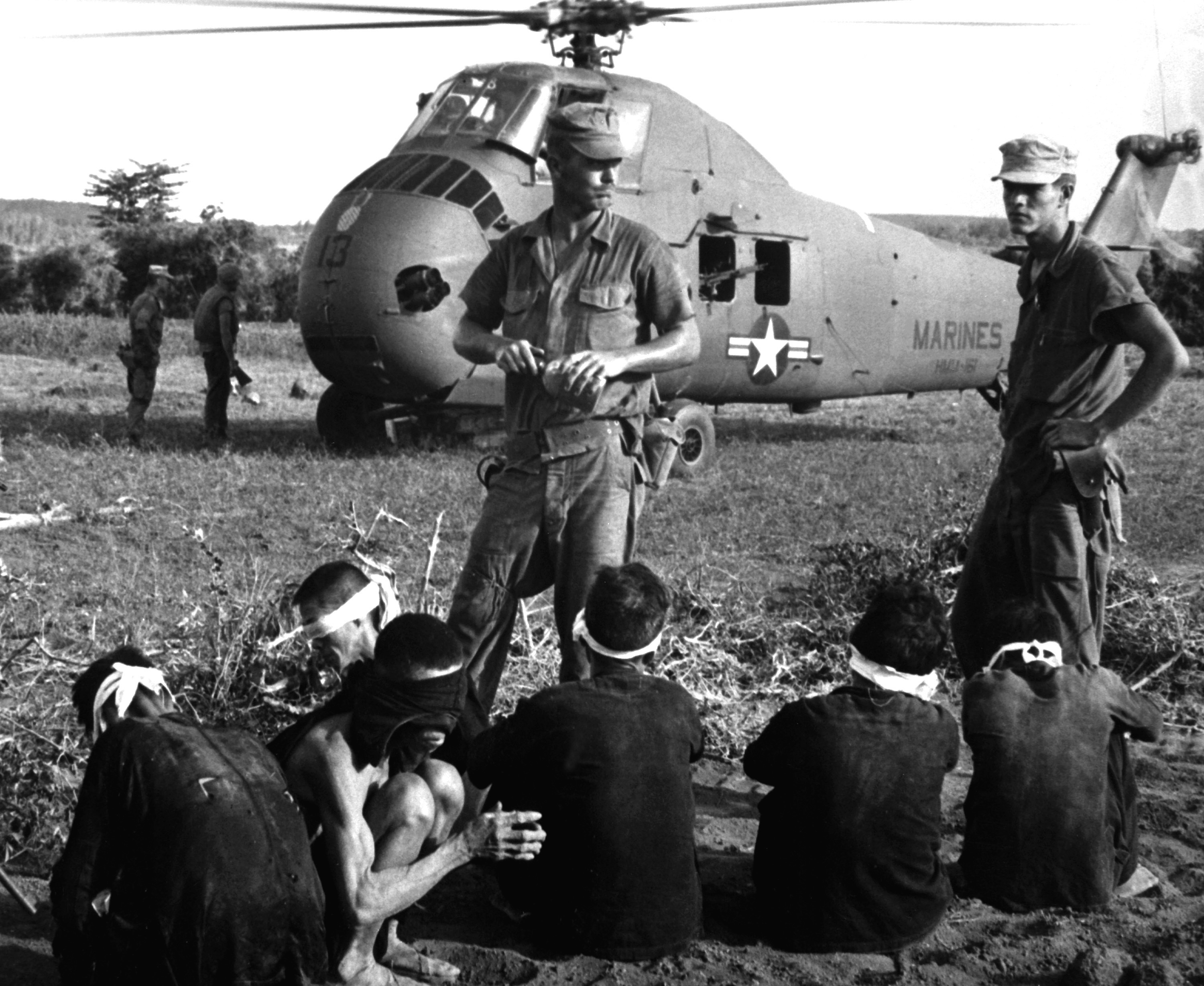
A helicopter from HMM-161 waiting to transport prisoners just south of Chu Lai during Operation Starlite in 1965.

HMM-161 departed Hawaii on 15 March 1965, on board the USS Valley Forge and arrived at Marine Corps Air Facility Futema, Okinawa, Japan on 27 March. On 27 April the squadron departed Okinawa on board the USS Princeton headed for South Vietnam. 6 May saw the squadron lifting elements of the 4th Marine Regiment ashore at Chu Lai and on 15 May, the squadron began operating from the USS Iwo Jima. Finally on 25 May 1965, HMM-161 came ashore at Chu Lai and was assigned under the command of Marine Aircraft Group 16 (MAG-16), and the 1st Marine Aircraft Wing (1st MAW). On 12 June the squadron again relocated, this time to the Phu Bai Combat Base.

On 4 January 1966, HMM-161 was relieved by HMM-163 and redeployed to Marine Corps Air Station Futenma, Okinawa to receive its new Vertol CH-46 Sea Knights. During this deployment to Vietnam the squadron had one pilot awarded the Silver Star and another eleven awarded the Distinguished Flying Cross By April 1966, the squadron had redeployed to Da Nang, South Vietnam with a move to Phu Bai that June. On 25 September 1966, a UH-34D HUS from HMM-161 was struck by a friendly artillery shell while conducting a medevac mission during Operation Prairie resulting in the death all five Marines on board. It is the only known case of friendly artillery fire shooting down an American helicopter during the war. The squadron relocated once again in November 1966 to Futenma, Okinawa, where it was attached to Marine Aircraft Group 15 (MAG-15), 9th Marine Amphibious Brigade. A month later the squadron returned to CONUS, as they were attached to Marine Aircraft Group 26 (MAG-26), 2d MAW at Marine Corps Air Station New River, North Carolina. HMM-161 then redeployed in May 1968 to Quảng Trị Combat Base, South Vietnam and attached to provisional Marine Aircraft Group 39 (MAG-39), 1st MAW. The Squadron finished its Vietnam years with its final deployment to Phu Bai in October 1969 while attached to MAG-16, 1st MAW.

HMM-161 came home in September 1970 and attached to MAG-56, 3rd Marine Aircraft Wing, Fleet Marine Force Pacific. It was reassigned in July 1971 to MAG-16, 3d MAW. Elements of the Squadron participated in the August 1989 cleanup of the Exxon Valdez oil spill in Prince William Sound, Alaska.

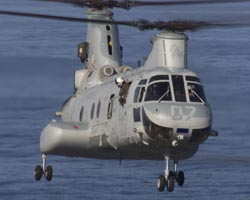
CH-46E

=== The Gulf War and the 1990s ===
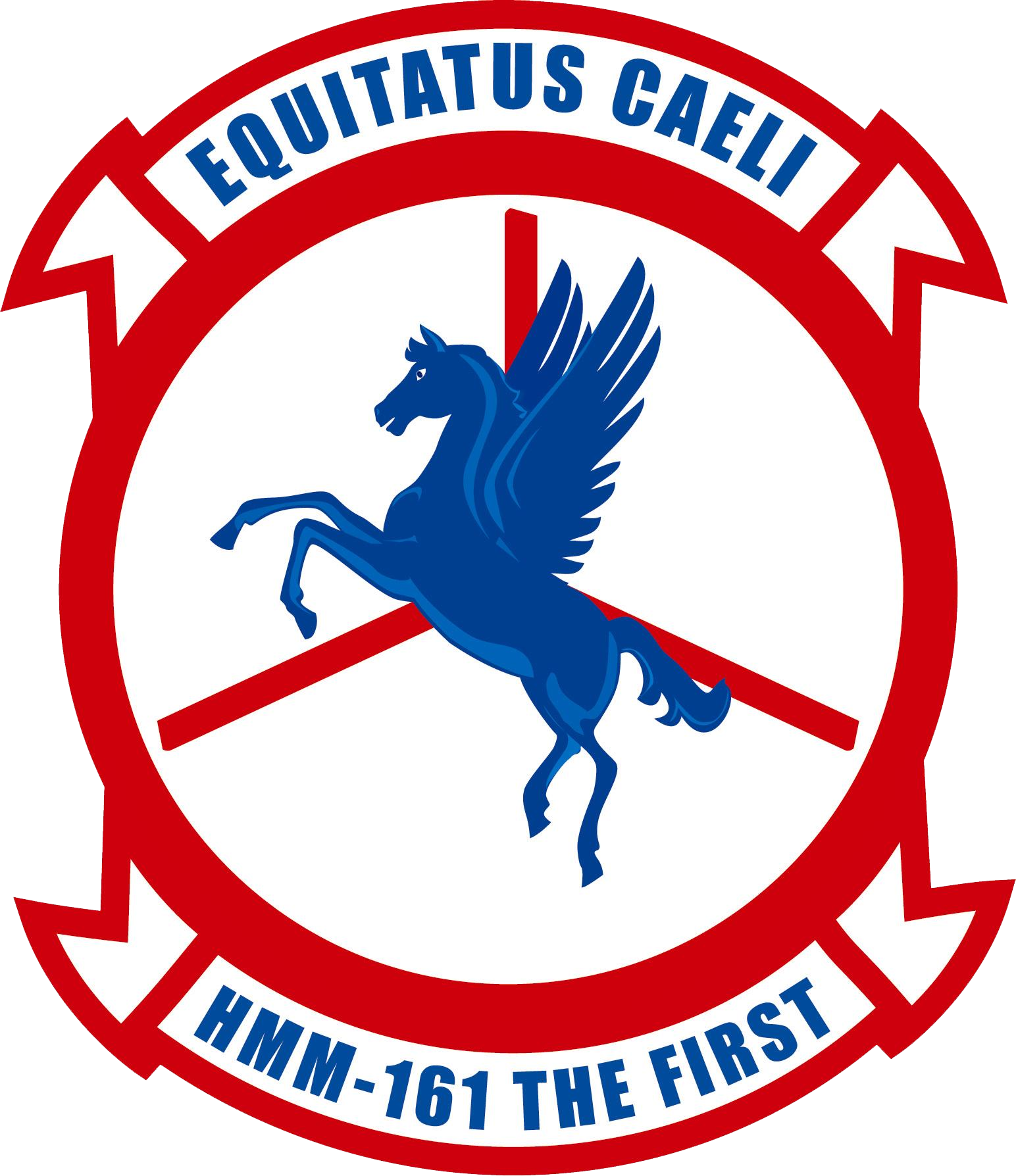
Old HMM-161 insignia.

In 1990 they deployed on 17 August to Saudi Arabia as part of MAG-70, 7th Marine Expeditionary Brigade in support of Operation Desert Shield. The squadron would eventually participate in Operation Desert Storm in Saudi Arabia and Kuwait. In 1995, they participated in Operation United Shield, the withdrawal of United Nations Forces from Somalia. By the end of the year, the unit had relocated to MCAS El Toro, California. In 1997, the Greyhawks deployed in March aboard the USS Boxer to the WESTPAC and Persian Gulf as the ACE for the 15th MEU(SOC), where they flew missions in support of Operation Southern Watch in Iraq. In February 1999, HMM-161 moved from MCAS El Toro to MCAS Miramar, California.

=== Global war on terror ===
The new millennium began well for the Squadron, as it won the Edward C. Dyer Marine Medium Helicopter Squadron of the Year for 2001. This followed the 2000 WESTPAC Deployment, which saw the Greyhawks provide humanitarian assistance in East Timor. On 6 January 2003, HMM-161 (Rein) deployed as a part of the 15th MEU for a WESTPAC Float that would end up supporting Operation Enduring Freedom and Operation Iraqi Freedom. The Greyhawks were assigned the mission of Tactical Recovery of Aircraft and Personnel (TRAP). Although no TRAP missions were necessary during the OIF, the Squadron did fly Casevac and numerous other missions. The Squadron returned home to MCAS Miramar on 12 July 2003.

In November 2003, Marines of HMM-161 were told they would be redeploying to Iraq for Operation Iraqi Freedom II (OIF II). Immediate preparations were begun, and the Squadron used its December deployment to Indian Springs, Nevada to train for the conditions that would be faced during OIF II. While at Indian Springs, the Marines of HMM-161 made their mark in Squadron history by surpassing the 40,000 mishap-free flight hours plateau. This climb into the history books began back in August 1995 and culminated with a ground crew appreciation flight over the Hoover Dam and the Las Vegas Strip.

After receiving its cargo and aircraft at Ash Shu'aybah Port, Kuwait, the Squadron flew up to Al Taqaddum, Iraq during the first week of March to set up for the relief in place with the 82nd Airborne Brigade. The Squadron made 752 consecutive mission launches in support of I MEF operations during OIF II, logging 3072.8 hours of flight time. The Greyhawks were relieved on 1 September 2004, by HMM-268 with the main body arriving back at MCAS Miramar on 6 September. Throughout their service during OIF II, the Greyhawks moved 116,480 pounds of cargo and 2,929 passengers, including 328 patients that needed urgent care.

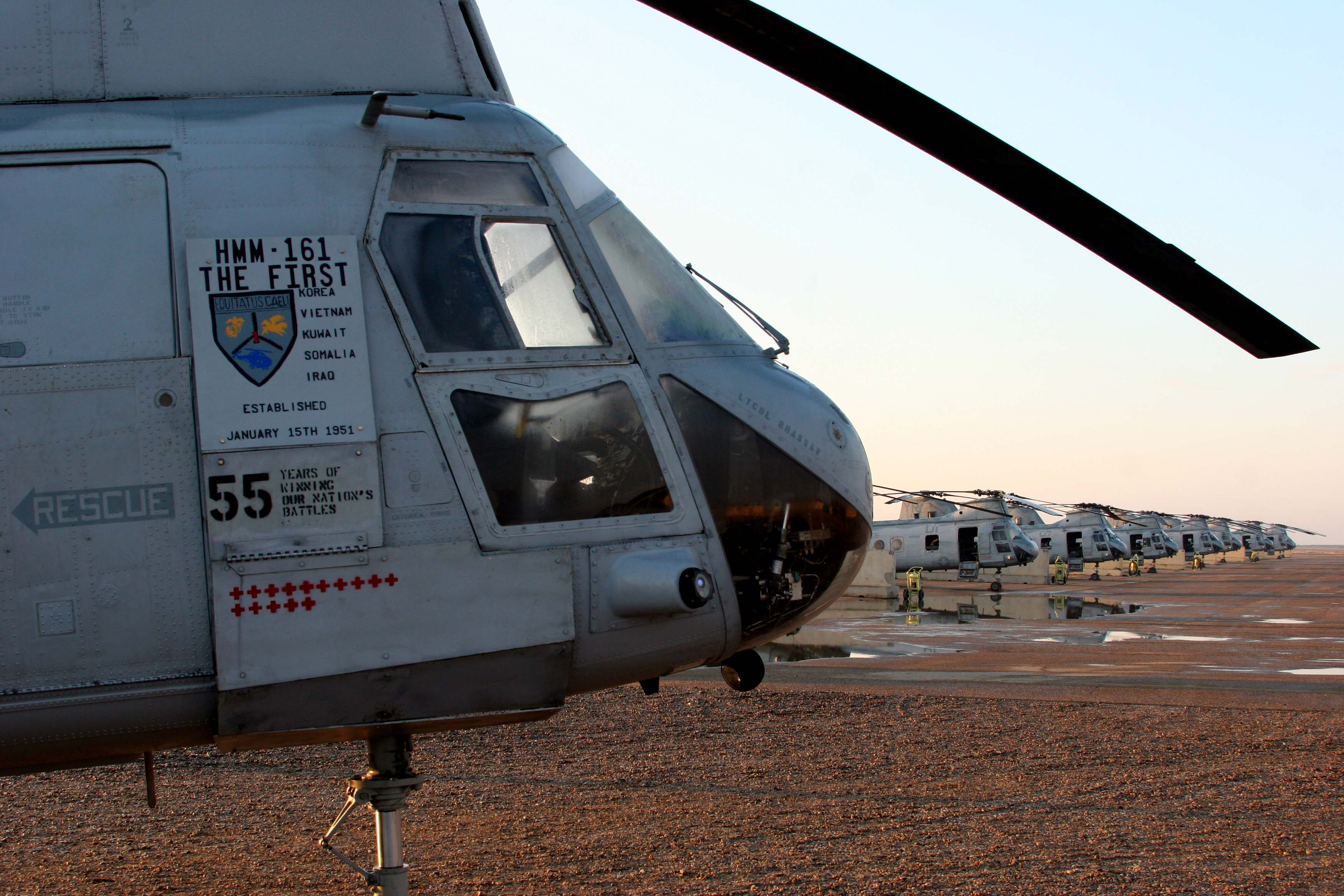
HMM-161 Phrog painted for squadron's 55th Anniversary celebrated in Iraq on 15 January 2006.

In August 2005, the squadron redeployed to Iraq for its third OIF deployment. The Greyhawks provided around-the-clock casualty evacuation and assault support in Al Anbar Province. During this deployment, the squadron flew 5,199 combat flight hours, transported more than 2,100 wounded personnel and conducted 19 raids and assault support missions that led to the capture of numerous insurgents. The Greyhawks safely completing 2,999 assault support requests without mishap or damage from enemy action.

On 8 February 2006, HMM-161 marked their 50,000th flight hour without a Class "A" mishap during their latest deployment to Al Taqaddum, Iraq. During this time period, which began 19 February 1995, the squadron flew 9,100 combat hours during three combat deployments.

The squadron returned from its third OIF deployment on 4 March 2006. Following the deployment the squadron was awarded its fourth consecutive Chief of Naval Operations Safety Award and the Marine Corps Aviation Association's 2006 Commandant's Aviation Award in recognition as the year's best overall performance by a Marine squadron.

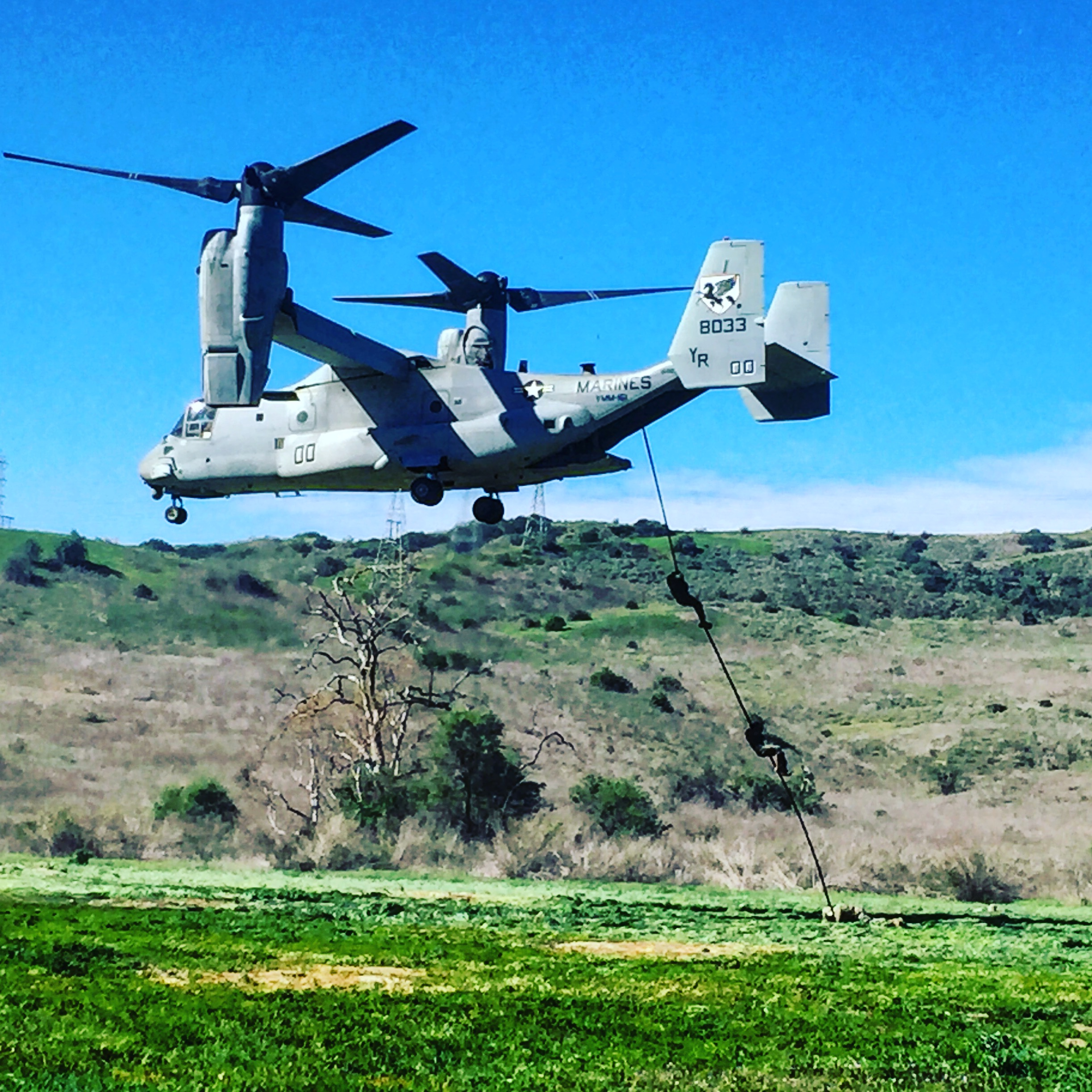
Conducting Fastrope operation on MCAS Camp Pendleton in 2016

On 3 February 2007, HMM-161 embarked upon its fourth combat deployment in support of Operation Iraqi Freedom and the Global War on Terror by sending a small advance party back to Al Taqaddum, Iraq to prepare for the arrival of the Squadron's Main Body on 1 March. The Greyhawks officially resumed their role in Casualty Evacuations and General Support on 9 March 2007.

On 24 September, HMM-161 returned from Al Taqaddum, Iraq, with their CASEVAC bell, the symbol of their mission in the area. They took the bell with them instead of leaving it for the next squadron because the mission of CASEVAC had been temporarily turned over to the soldiers of an Army Blackhawk detachment on the same base.

At the completion of their deployment, HMM-161 successfully logged a record of over 58,000 class A mishap free flight hours total. This achievement is will remain intact and be unable to be surpassed by any other CH-46E squadron due to the fact the new MV-22 Osprey will be replacing the CH-46E, and no other squadron has a record close enough to the Greyhawks' that they would be able to beat it. This milestone once again showed why the men and women of the Greyhawks are "The First, The Best".

In December 2009, HMM-161 became the first of ten west coast squadrons to transition to the MV-22 Osprey and was redesignated as Marine Medium Tiltrotor Squadron 161 during the change of command.

VMM-161 completed its operational training requirements to the MV-22 Osprey and became a fully capable, combat ready tiltrotor squadron in April 2011. Shortly thereafter, in July 2012, the Greyhawks deployed to Afghanistan to support Operation Enduring Freedom as the first combat deployment for the MV-22. The squadron completed the deployment and subsequently returned safely to MCAS Miramar in January 2013, having flown more than 2,200 hours, supporting more than 100 named operations, and suffering zero mishaps.

== See also ==
- United States Marine Corps Aviation
- List of active United States Marine Corps aircraft squadrons
- List of decommissioned United States Marine Corps aircraft squadrons
