= General Wills =

General Wills may refer to:

- Charles Wills (1666–1741), British Army general
- Craig D. Wills (fl. 1990s–2020s), U.S. Air Force major general
- Duane A. Wills (1939–2007), U.S. Marine Corps lieutenant general
