= General Dyer =

General Dyer may refer to:

- Alexander Brydie Dyer (1815–1874), Union Army brigadier general and brevet major general
- Edward C. Dyer (1907–1975), U.S. Marine Corps brigadier general
- Reginald Dyer (1864–1927), British Indian Army brigadier general (temporary rank), notably associated with the Amritsar massacre during colonial rule in India
- General Dyer, a fictional British general in the 1985 Indian film Mard, portrayed by Kamal Kapoor
