= Jon M. Davis =

United States Marine Corps general

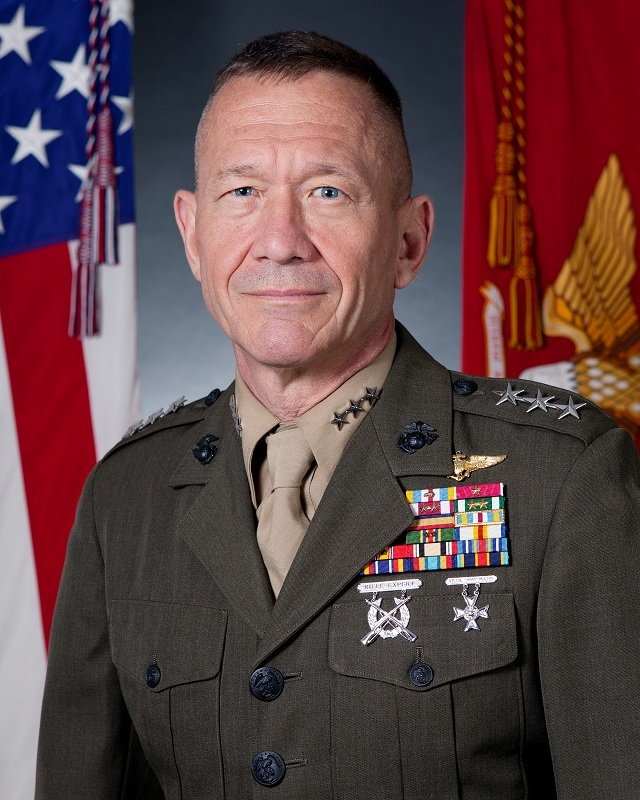
- Military career
- Allegiance: United States
- Branch: United States Marine Corps
- Service years: May 1980—July 2017
- Rank: Lieutenant General
- Commands: Deputy Commandant for Aviation; 2nd Marine Aircraft Wing; MAWTS-1; VMA-223
- Awards: Defense Distinguished Service Medal; Navy Distinguished Service Medal; Defense Superior Service Medal (two awards); Legion of Merit (two awards); National Intelligence Distinguished Service Medal

Jon M. Davis is a retired United States Marine Corps lieutenant general. His last assignment in the Marine Corps was as the Deputy Commandant for Aviation.

== Military service ==
Since his commissioning in 1980, he has served in various command and staff billets, including his participation in Operation Iraqi Freedom. From 1998 to 2000, he commanded VMA-223.

Commissioned in May 1980 through the PLC Program, Davis completed the Basic School in August 1980 and then reported for flight training. Upon receiving his wings in September 1982, he was selected to fly the AV-8A Harrier.

He reported to VMAT-203 in October 1982, completed Harrier training and reported to VMA-231 in 1983, where he deployed aboard the USS Inchon. In 1985 he transferred to VMAT-203 serving as an instructor pilot. In 1986 he attended the WTI course at MAWTS-1. In 1987 he transferred to VMA-223 serving as the "Bulldogs" WTI and operations officer. From 1988 to 1991 he served as an exchange officer with the Royal Air Force. After training in the United Kingdom, he deployed to Gutersloh, Germany for duty as a GR-5/7 attack pilot with 3(F) squadron. From 1991 to 1994 he served as an instructor at MAWTS-1 in MCAS Yuma, AZ. From 1998 to 2000 he commanded VMA-223. During his tour, VMA-223 won the CNO Safety Award and the Sanderson Trophy two years in a row, and exceeded 40,000 hours of mishap free operations. After completing the Executive Helicopter Familiarization Course at HT-18 in Pensacola in 2003, he was assigned to MAWTS-1 where he served as Executive Officer and from 2004 to 2006 as Commanding Officer. From 2006 to 2008 he served as the Deputy Commander Joint Functional Component Command—Network Warfare at Fort Meade, Maryland. He commanded the 2nd Marine Aircraft Wing from July 2010 to May 2012. From May 2012 to June 2014, he served as the Deputy Commander, United States Cyber Command.

His staff billets include a two-year tour as a member of the 31st Commandant's Staff Group and two years as the Junior Military Assistant to the Deputy Secretary of Defense. In 2003, he served as an Assistant Operations Officer on the 3rd Marine Air Wing staff in Kuwait during Operation Iraqi Freedom. In 2004, he served in Iraq as the Officer in Charge of the 3d Marine Aircraft Red Team. He served as the Deputy Assistant Commandant for Aviation from 2008 to 2010. In the course of his career, he has flown over 4,500 mishap free hours in the AV-8, F-5, and FA-18 and as a co-pilot in every type model series tilt-rotor, rotary winged and air refueler aircraft in the USMC inventory.

LtGen Davis graduated with honors from The Basic School and was a Distinguished Graduate of the Marine Corps Command and Staff College. He is a graduate of the Tactical Air Control Party Course, Amphibious Warfare School, Marine Aviation Weapons and Tactics Instructor Course (WTI), The School of Advanced Warfighting (SAW), and Johns Hopkins School of Advanced International Studies (SAIS). He holds a Bachelor of Science from Allegheny College, a Master of Science from Marine Corps University and a Master of International Public Policy from Johns Hopkins.

=== Post-government employment ===
He retired from service in 2017. Within weeks of retiring, Davis joined the board of Rolls-Royce, a company that produces the lift fan for the Marine variant of the F-35 aircraft. A watchdog group has pointed out that Davis participated in agreements for Rolls-Royce to provide the Rolls-Royce LiftSystem engine, and that he was a frequent champion of the aircraft.

== Awards and decorations ==

Naval Aviator Badge
Defense Distinguished Service Medal		Navy Distinguished Service Medal	Defense Superior Service Medal with one bronze oak leaf cluster
Legion of Merit with one gold award star	Meritorious Service Medal with two award stars	Navy Commendation Medal with two award stars	Navy Presidential Unit Citation
Navy Meritorious Unit Commendation with one bronze service star	National Intelligence Distinguished Service Medal	National Defense Service Medal with service star	Iraq Campaign Medal with service star
Global War on Terrorism Expeditionary Medal	Global War on Terrorism Service Medal	Navy Sea Service Deployment Ribbon	Navy and Marine Corps Overseas Service Ribbon
Office of the Secretary of Defense Identification Badge

- Davis also holds the Expert Rifle Badge and the Sharpshooter Pistol Badge.

Military offices
Preceded by James K. McLaughlin	Deputy Commander of the United States Cyber Command; 2012–2014	Succeeded by James K. McLaughlin
