= Keith B. McCutcheon =

United States Marine Corps general

Keith Barr McCutcheon
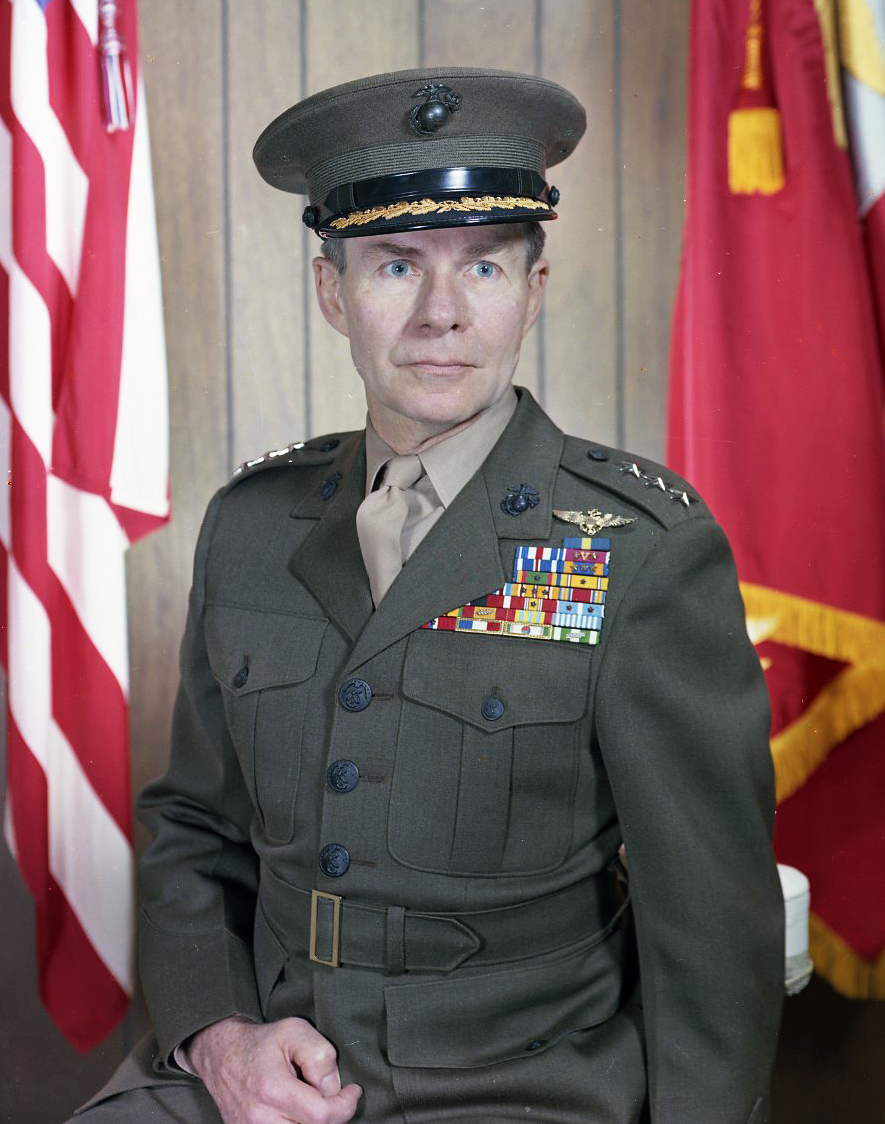
- Keith B. McCutcheon, Marine Corps aviator and general
- Born: August 10, 1915; East Liverpool, Ohio, U.S.
- Died: July 13, 1971 (aged 55); Bethesda, Maryland, U.S.
- Burial place: Arlington National Cemetery
- Military career
- Allegiance: United States of America
- Branch: United States Marine Corps
- Service years: 1937–1971
- Rank: General
- Commands: HMX-1; HMR-161; MAG-26; Director of Aviation; 1st Marine Brigade; 1st Marine Aircraft Wing; III Marine Amphibious Force
- Conflicts: World War II; Korean War; Vietnam War
- Awards: Distinguished Service Medal (3); Silver Star (Army); Legion of Merit with Combat "V" (3); Distinguished Flying Cross; Air Medal (10)

Keith Barr McCutcheon (August 10, 1915 – July 13, 1971) was a highly decorated Marine Corps four-star general and aviator seeing combat in World War II, the Korean War, and the Vietnam War. He earned the Distinguished Flying Cross and ten Air Medals.

== Early years ==
Keith McCutcheon was born on August 10, 1915, in East Liverpool, Ohio. He graduated from East Liverpool High School and received his B.S. degree from Carnegie Institute of Technology in 1937. An honor graduate of the schools' ROTC unit, he resigned a U.S. Army Reserve commission to accept appointment as a Marine Corps second lieutenant on July 1, 1937.

== Marine Corps career ==
McCutcheon's first assignment upon completion of Basic School was with the Marine detachment aboard the USS Yorktown. In 1940, he completed flight training, was designated a Naval aviator, and subsequently served with a Marine Observation Squadron aboard the aircraft carriers USS Ranger, USS Wasp, and USS Yorktown. He later completed aeronautical engineering courses at the U.S. Naval Postgraduate School and the Massachusetts Institute of Technology, earning his master's degree in 1944.

=== World War II ===
In September 1944, as a lieutenant colonel, he departed for the Pacific area. He served as operations officer of Marine Aircraft Group 24 at Bougainville, and at Luzon and Mindanao in the Philippine Islands. Additionally, he saw duty as operations officer of Marine Aircraft Groups, Dagupan on Luzon and, later, Zamboanga, on Mindanao. During the period from November 1, 1944, to May 26, 1945, he earned the Silver Star, the Legion of Merit with Combat "V", the Distinguished Flying Cross, and six Air Medals in the Solomons, New Guinea, and Philippine Islands area.

In November 1945, he returned to the United States to serve as an instructor in the Aviation Section, Marine Corps Schools, Quantico. From October 1946 until December 1949, he was assigned to the Bureau of Aeronautics, Navy Department, in Washington, D.C. He served in the Guided Missiles (then Pilotless Aircraft) Division of the Design and Engineering Group, and was branch chief at various times of the Liaison, Experimental Projects, and Target Drone branches. He also performed additional duty in 1947 as senior Marine Corps aide to the White House.

=== 1950s ===
==== Marine Helicopter Squadron One ====
McCutcheon was transferred to Norfolk in January 1950 and completed the course at the Armed Forces Staff College in June 1950. He was then ordered to Quantico for duty as commanding officer of Marine Helicopter Squadron One (HMX-One), the Corps' only helicopter squadron at that time. During the next 18 months, HMX-One served as a focal point for the expansion of the Marine Corps Helicopter program. He was promoted to colonel in June 1951.

==== Korean War ====
In December 1951, McCutcheon took command of Marine Helicopter Transport Squadron 161 in Korea. He earned his second Legion of Merit with Combat "V" and his seventh through tenth Air Medals in this capacity. In October 1952, he reported to Headquarters, United States European Command, in Frankfurt, West Germany, where he served successively as operations officer, assistant chief, and later chief, Operations Branch, J-3 Division until May 1954.

McCutcheon assumed duties in June 1954 as chief, Air Section, Marine Corps Equipment Board, Quantico. In August 1957, he reported as commanding officer, MAG-26, at New River, North Carolina. He commanded the helicopter group until June 1959, when he was detached to enter the National War College in Washington.

=== 1960s ===
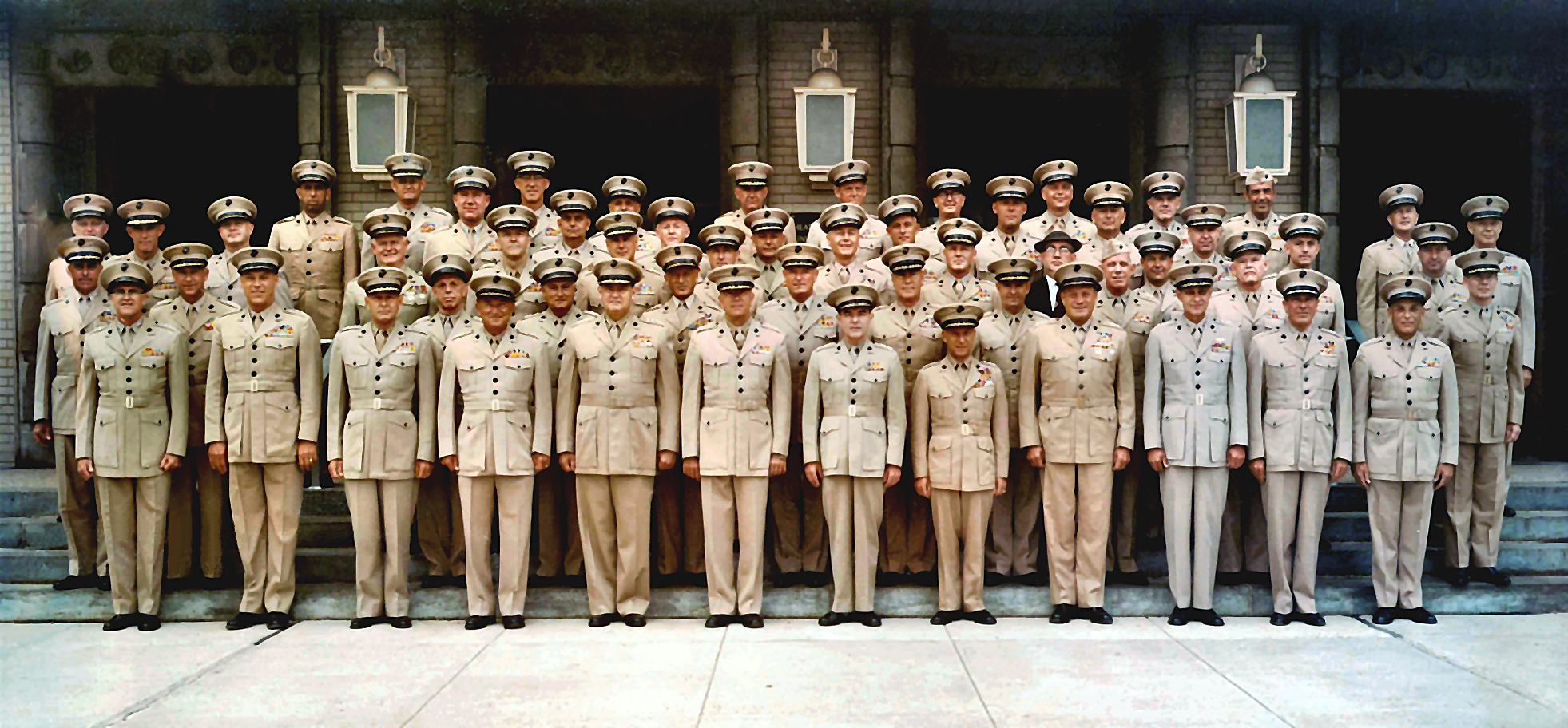
McCutcheon (right-most, 2nd row from bottom) at the 1967 General Officers Symposium

Following graduation, he was assigned to Headquarters Marine Corps in July 1960 as assistant director of aviation, becoming Director of Aviation in September 1961. In March 1962, he was promoted to brigadier general and assumed command of the Hawaii-based 1st Marine Brigade. Remaining in Hawaii, he joined the staff of the commander in chief, Pacific, in January 1963 as assistant chief of staff for operations. For exceptionally meritorious service in this capacity from 1963 to 1965, he was awarded his third Legion of Merit.

==== Vietnam War ====
Ordered to South Vietnam in June 1965, McCutcheon earned his first Distinguished Service Medal for service as commanding general, 1st Marine Aircraft Wing and as deputy commander, III Marine Amphibious Force. He was also awarded the Vietnamese Gallantry Cross with Palm and the Honor Medal (First Class). In January 1966, he was promoted to major general while serving in South Vietnam.

Upon his return to the United States in June 1966, McCutcheon served almost four years as deputy chief of staff (air), at Headquarters Marine Corps, and earned a Gold Star in lieu of a second Distinguished Service Medal.

=== 1970s ===
Nominated for promotion to lieutenant general, his nomination was approved by President Nixon on February 5, 1970, and confirmed by the Senate on February 24, 1970. After his promotion to that rank on February 26, 1970, he returned to South Vietnam for duty as commanding general, III Marine Amphibious Force. For exceptionally meritorious service in this assignment through January 1971, he was awarded his third Distinguished Service Medal. At the time of his retirement, he was special assistant to the commandant of the Marine Corps.

=== Promotion to general and retirement ===
McCutcheon was nominated for promotion to general and appointed assistant commandant of the Marine Corps in 1970 by President Nixon, although he was unable to assume the post because of ill health. However, because of his distinguished career as a Marine, Congress passed special legislation which provided he be placed on the retired list with the rank of general.

On July 1, 1971, McCutcheon received his promotion and was placed on the retired list. He died of cancer on July 13, 1971, at the National Naval Medical Center, Bethesda, Maryland. He is buried in Arlington National Cemetery.

== Decorations ==
A complete list of his decorations and medals include:

Naval Aviator Badge
1st Row	Navy Distinguished Service Medal w/ 2 award stars			
2nd Row	Silver Star	Legion of Merit w/ 2 award stars & valor device	Distinguished Flying Cross	Air Medal w/ 9 award stars
3rd Row	Navy Unit Commendation w/ 3 service stars	American Defense Service Medal w/ Base clasp	American Campaign Medal	Asiatic-Pacific Campaign Medal w/ 3 service stars
4th Row	World War II Victory Medal	Navy Occupation Service Medal w/ Europe clasp	National Defense Service Medal w/ 1 service star	Korean Service Medal w/ 3 service stars
5th Row	Vietnam Service Medal w/ 4 service stars	Vietnam Gallantry Cross w/ palm	Vietnam Armed Forces Honor Medal 2nd class	Philippines Presidential Unit Citation
6th Row	Korean Presidential Unit Citation	Philippine Liberation Medal w/ 1 service star	United Nations Korea Medal	Vietnam Campaign Medal

== See also ==
- List of 1st Marine Aircraft Wing commanders

Military offices
Preceded by Albert F. Binney	Director of Aviation; September 11, 1961 - February 17, 1962; First term	Succeeded by Marion E. Carl
Preceded by Paul J. Fontana	Commanding General of the 1st Marine Aircraft Wing; May 24, 1965 - May 16, 1966	Succeeded by Louis Robertshaw
Preceded by Louis Robertshaw	Deputy Chief of Staff (Air); June 15, 1966 - February 18, 1970; Second term	Succeeded by Homer S. Hill
