= Homer S. Hill =

American Major general

Homer Spurgeon Hill
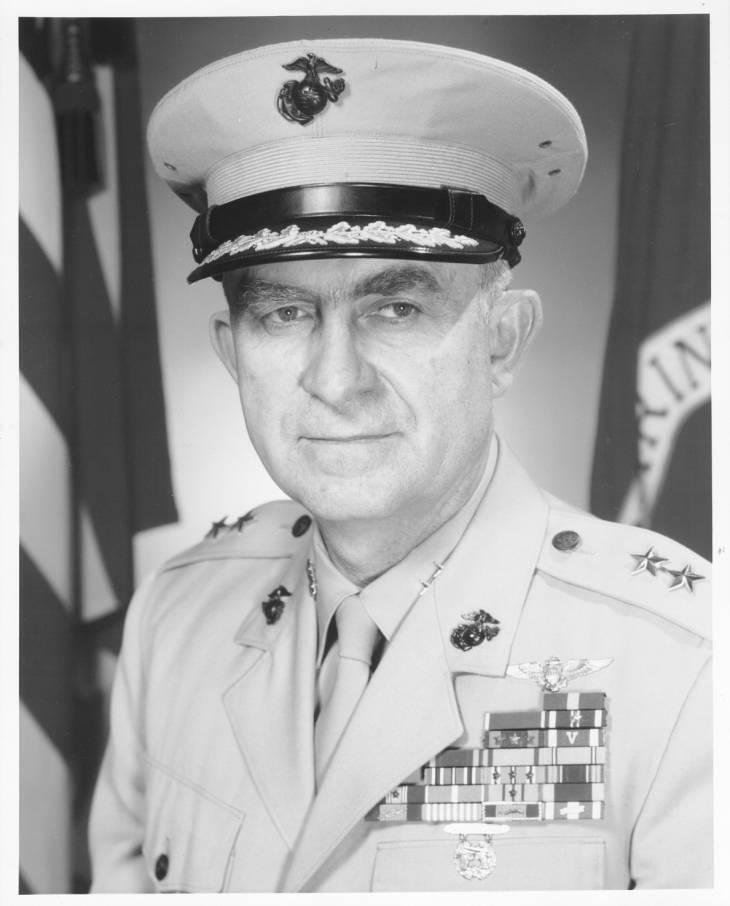
- Hill as Major general, USMC
- Born: July 21, 1919; Winnsboro, Texas, U.S.
- Died: August 7, 1992 (aged 73); Solana Beach, California, U.S.
- Military career
- Allegiance: United States of America
- Branch: United States Marine Corps
- Service years: 1941-1974
- Rank: Major general
- Nickname: "Dan"
- Service number: 0-10931
- Commands: 3rd Marine Aircraft Wing; Marine Corps Aviation; Marine Helicopter Squadron 362; Marine Fighter Squadron 314
- Conflicts: World War II: Guadalcanal campaign; New Georgia campaign; Bougainville campaign; Korean War; Vietnam War: Operation Meade River
- Awards: Distinguished Service Medal; Legion of Merit (2); Distinguished Flying Cross (2); Navy Commendation Medal; Air Medal (8)

Homer Spurgeon Hill (July 21, 1919 – August 7, 1992) was a decorated naval aviator in the United States Marine Corps with the rank of major general. A veteran of three wars, Hill began his career as a reservist and pilot of transport planes, participating in combats in Pacific theater.

Following the war, he was transferred to active duty and rose to the general's rank, participating as Assistant Wing Commander, 1st Marine Aircraft Wing in Vietnam War. He later served as Director of Marine Aviation and during his tenure, McDonnell Douglas AV-8B Harrier II, a single-engine ground-attack aircraft capable of vertical or short takeoff and landing was introduced by the Marine Corps. Hill completed his career as Commanding general, 3rd Marine Aircraft Wing in January 1974.

== Early career and World War II ==
Homer S. Hill was born on July 21, 1919, in Winnsboro, Texas, as the son of farmer Gary Lewis Hill and Ivy Juanita Connelly Hill. He completed the Mount Vernon High School in summer 1936 and entered the Texas A&M College in College Station, Texas. While at the college, Hill was active in basketball; was a member of the Reserve Officer Training Corps and also served as Class Vice President in his Senior year. He graduated with Bachelor of Science degree in Agriculture in June 1940.

Hill enlisted the Marine Corps Reserve in June 1941 and entered the Naval Aviation Cadet Training Program at Naval Air Station Corpus Christi, Texas. He completed the flight training in June 1942 and was commissioned second lieutenant in the Marine Corps Reserve. Hill was subsequently assigned to Marine Transport Squadron 253 and embarked for South Pacific.

His squadron then operated within 1st Marine Aircraft Wing on Guadalcanal, New Georgia, and Bougainville, providing air transport of personnel, equipment, and supplies, including aeromedical evacuation and Hill was decorated with two Distinguished Flying Crossess and eight Air Medals. During that time, he was promoted to first lieutenant in December 1942 and to Captain in June 1943.

He completed his overseas tour in early 1944 and returned to the United States in order to enter the Aviation Ground Officers' School at Marine Corps Base Quantico, Virginia, which he completed the school in early 1945.

== Korea and postwar service ==
Hill remained stateside for the first half of 1945 and was promoted to Major in July 1945. He was then ordered to Hawaii, where he joined the Marine Aircraft Group 15 at Marine Corps Air Station Ewa. He served as Group's executive officer until early 1947 and meanwhile was transferred to the regular Marine Corps in March 1946. He was transferred to the headquarters, 1st Marine Aircraft Wing in few weeks later and assumed duty as Assistant Operations and Flight Officer under Brigadier General Lawson H. M. Sanderson. While in this capacity, his wing provided support actions during the occupation of North China during Chinese Civil War.

In July 1949, Hill was ordered back to the United States and joined the Personnel Department at Headquarters Marine Corps in Washington, D.C., as Assistant Coordinator in Detail Branch under Major General John T. Walker. He was ordered to Marine Corps Air Station Cherry Point, North Carolina, in February 1952 and assumed command of newly activated Marine Fighter Squadron 314. His squadron was attached to 3rd Marine Aircraft Wing under Major General Albert D. Cooley and transitioned from F4U Corsairs to new F9F Panther jet fighters. Hill was promoted to lieutenant colonel in October 1952.

He led his squadron during the maneuvers in the Caribbean and deployed to Korea in September 1953, being transferred to 1st Marine Aircraft Wing under Major General Vernon E. Megee. Due to signed peace agreement, the operations of Hill's squadron were limited to the patrolling along the Korean Demilitarized Zone. Hill remained in Korea until September 1954 and was decorated with Navy Commendation Medal with Combat "V" for his service.

Following his return stateside, Hill entered the Senior Course at Amphibious Warfare School at Marine Corps Schools, Quantico, graduating in June 1955. He then assumed command of Aircraft Engineering Squadron 15 stationed at Quantico and remained in that assignment until June 1957, when he joined the Helicopter Training Group at Ellyson Field, Naval Air Station Pensacola, Florida, for two-month helicopter training. He then rejoined 3rd Marine Aircraft Wing (3rd MAW) under Major General Thomas G. Ennis at Marine Corps Air Station El Toro, California, and assumed duty as Group Operations officer, Marine Aircraft Group 36.

Hill served in that capacity until January 1958, when he was appointed Commanding officer of Marine Helicopter Squadron 362 attached to 3rd MAW. He spent one year in this assignment and then assumed duty as commander of the Marine Detachment and Air Officer aboard the aircraft carrier Princeton.

While aboard Princeton, Hill participated in the extensive training periods of Helicopter air assaults near the coast of San Diego, California, and then exercises in Okinawan waters. He completed this tour in June 1961 and then reported to Headquarters Marine Corps for duty as Head, Officer Plans Branch, Personnel Department under Major General August Larson. While in this capacity, he was promoted to Colonel in July 1962.

== Vietnam war ==
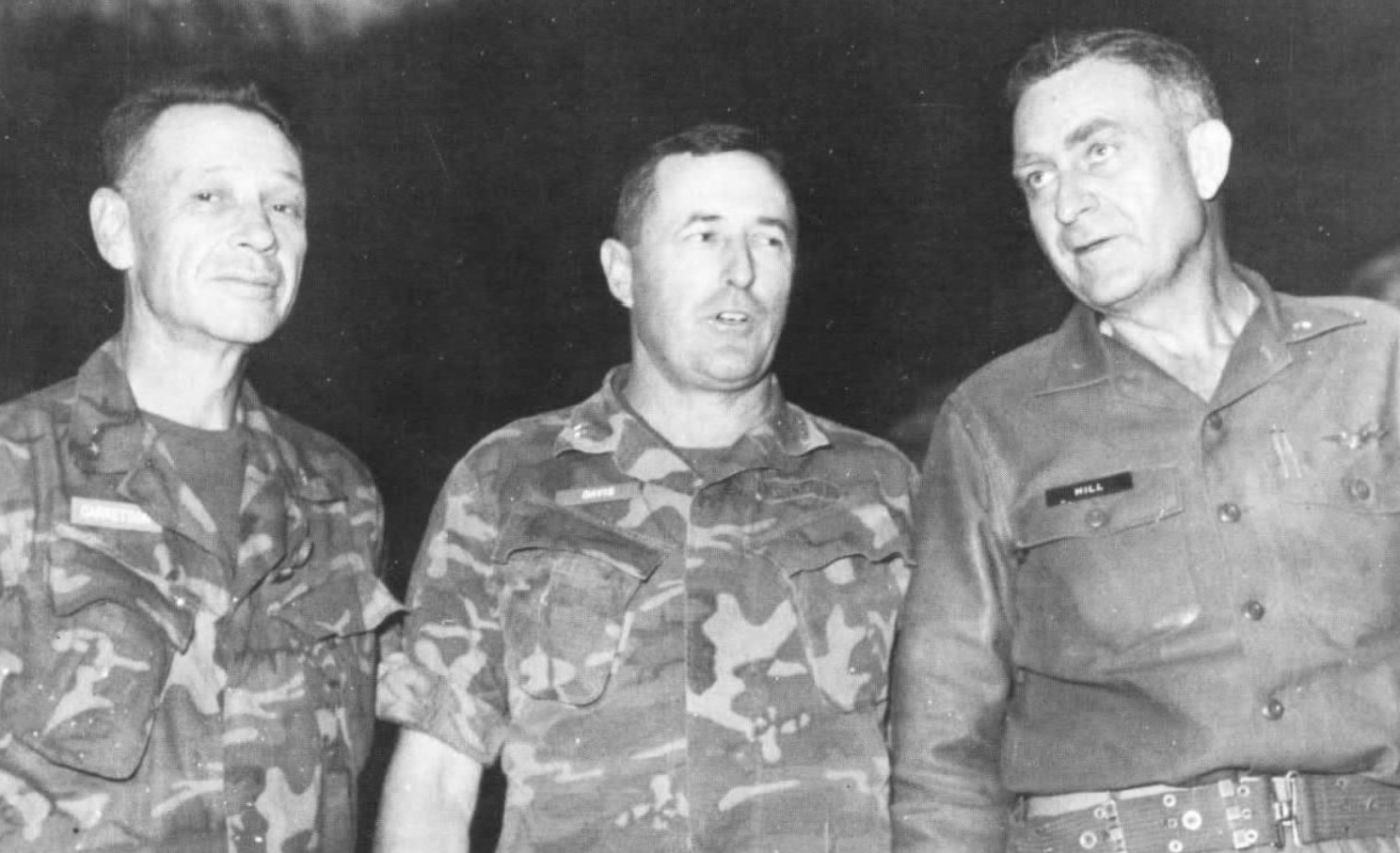
Hill (right) discusses the aviation requirements for the 3rd Marine Division with Major general Raymond G. Davis and his deputy, Brigadier General Frank E. Garretson in South Vietnam, May 1968.

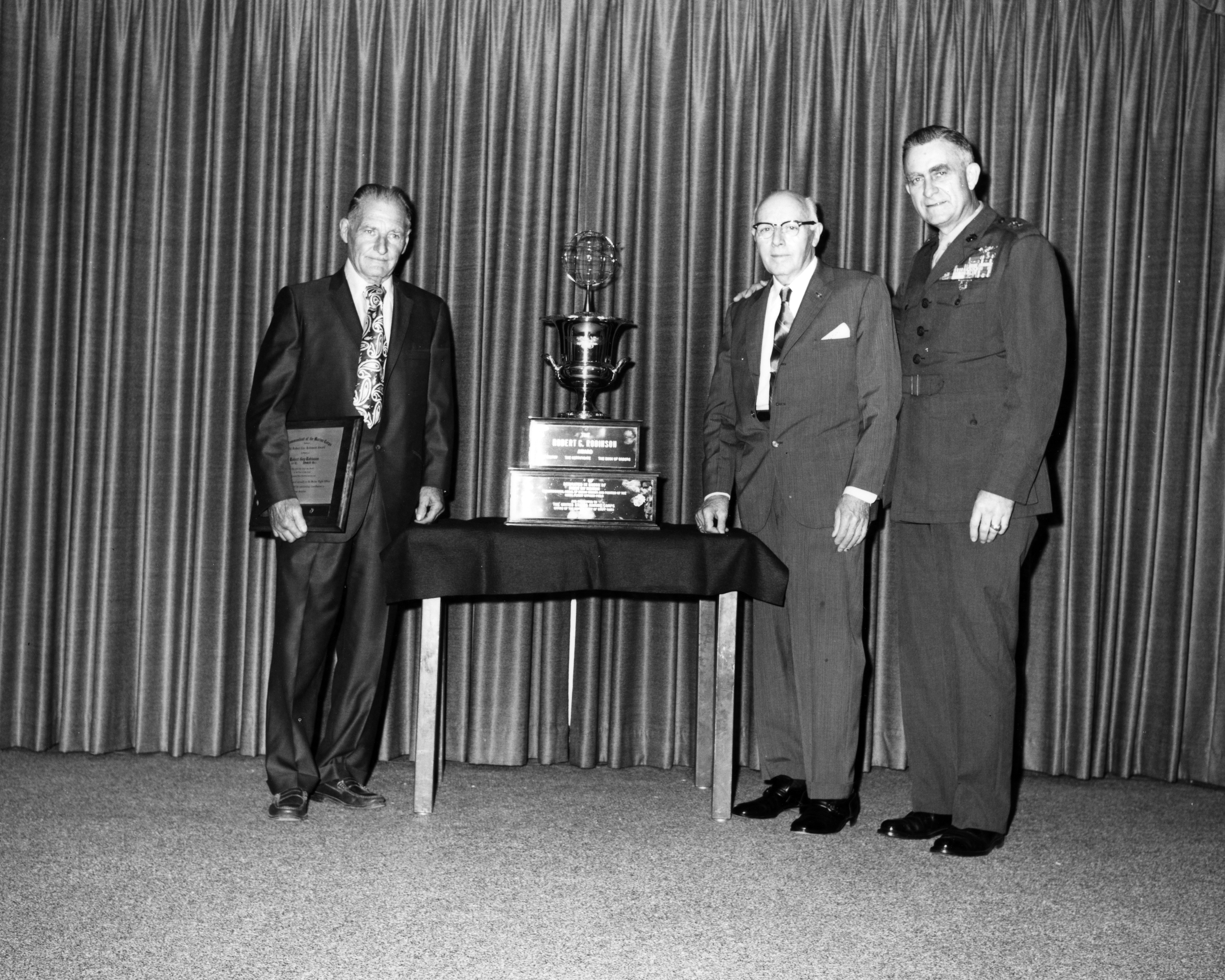
Hill (right) during the presentation of Robert G. Robinson award. Robinson is on the left. September 1971.

In June 1964, Hill was ordered to the National War College for senior course, which he completed one year later and departed for Hawaii, where he joined the headquarters, Fleet Marine Force, Pacific under Lieutenant General Victor H. Krulak as Deputy Operations officer. He was later promoted to Assistant Chief of staff for Personnel and held that assignment during the first two years of U.S. involvement in Vietnam, being responsible for the planning and execution of the replacements and training. Hill distinguished himself in this capacity and received Legion of Merit for his service.

Hill was transferred to the Marine Corps Air Station Cherry Point, North Carolina, in June 1967, and assumed duty as Assistant Wing Commander, 2nd Marine Aircraft Wing under Major General Hugh M. Elwood. For his new billet, he was promoted to brigadier general one month later and his main duty was to administer and supervise the training of replacements for Marine Air units deployed in Southeast Asia.

By the end of April 1968, Hill was ordered to South Vietnam and joined the headquarters of 1st Marine Aircraft Wing in Da Nang. While in this capacity, he served as Deputy to Major general Charles J. Quilter and his main duty was to coordinate air operations of 1st MAW units during the operations against the North Vietnamese forces along the Vietnamese Demilitarized Zone. Hill also served as Air commander for northern I Corps and established close cooperation with the 3rd Marine Division under Major General Raymond G. Davis.

His staff members maintained a constant dialogue on both fixed-wing and helo support for the Division and these efforts were crucial in the improving of Marine Air Ground tactics. Hill completed his tour in Vietnam in May 1969 and was decorated with Navy Distinguished Service Medal and also received National Order of Vietnam and Gallantry Cross with Palm by the Government of South Vietnam.

== Later service ==
Hill returned to the United States in June 1969 and reported to the Headquarters Marine Corps for duty in the office of Deputy Chief of Staff for Air (Director of Aviation) under Major General Keith B. McCutcheon. He served as McCutcheon's deputy until the end of February 1970, when he succeeded him as Director of Aviation. For his new billet, Hill was promoted to major general on August 13, 1970.

During his tenure, McDonnell Douglas AV-8B Harrier II, a single-engine ground-attack aircraft capable of vertical or short takeoff and landing was ordered by the Marine Corps. Hill served in this capacity until the end of August 1972 and received his second Legion of Merit for his service.

Hill was subsequently ordered to Marine Corps Air Station El Toro, California, and assumed duty as Commanding general, 3rd Marine Aircraft Wing (3rd MAW) with additional duty as Commanding general, I Marine Amphibious Force, consisting of 1st Marine Division, 1st Marine Logistics Group and 3rd MAW.

== Retirement ==
Hill retired from active duty on January 31, 1974, after 33 years of commissioned service and settled in Solana Beach, California. He was active in the Marine Corps Association and died on August 7, 1992, aged 73. He was married with one daughter.

== Decorations ==
Major general Hill's personal decorations include:

Naval Aviator Badge
1st Row	Navy Distinguished Service Medal		Legion of Merit with one 5/16" Gold Star	Distinguished Flying Cross with one 5/16" Gold Star	
2nd Row	Air Medal with one silver and two 5/16" Gold Stars	Navy Commendation Medal with Combat "V"		Navy Unit Commendation	American Defense Service Medal
3rd Row	American Campaign Medal	Asiatic-Pacific Campaign Medal with three 3/16 inch service stars		World War II Victory Medal	China Service Medal
4th Row	National Defense Service Medal with one service star	Korean Service Medal		Vietnam Service Medal with one 3/16 inch service star	National Order of Vietnam, Knight
5th Row	Vietnam Gallantry Cross with Bronze Star	United Nations Korea Medal		Vietnam Gallantry Cross Unit Citation	Vietnam Campaign Medal

== See also ==
- Marine Corps Aviation

Military offices
Preceded by Albert C. Pommerenk	Commanding general, 3rd Marine Aircraft Wing; October 1, 1972 - January 31, 1974	Succeeded by William R. Quinn
Preceded by Keith B. McCutcheon	Director of Marine Corps Aviation; February 19, 1970 - August 24, 1972	Succeeded by Edward S. Fris
