= Deputy Commandant for Aviation =

Command position in the US Marine Corps

Deputy Commandant For Aviation
- DCA
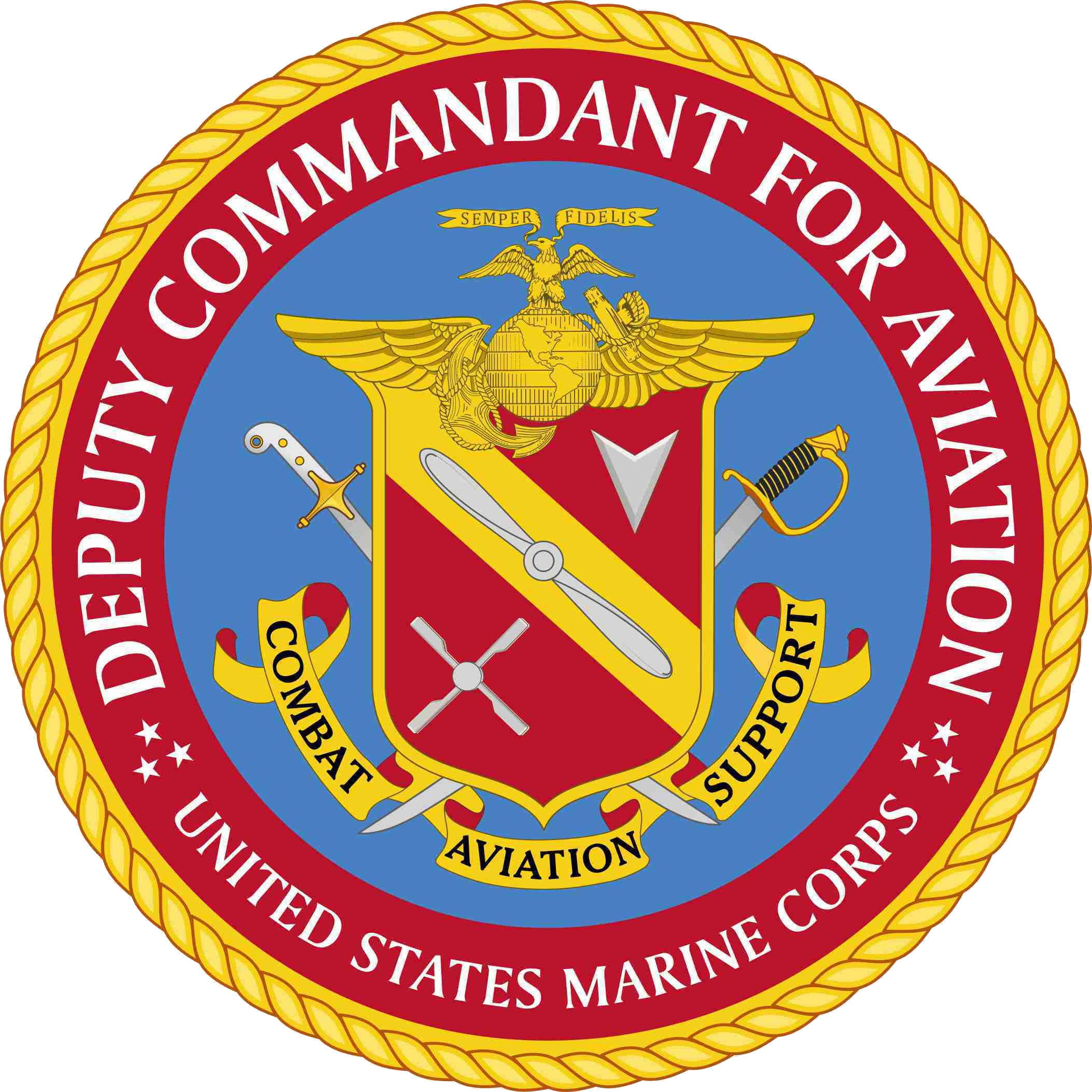

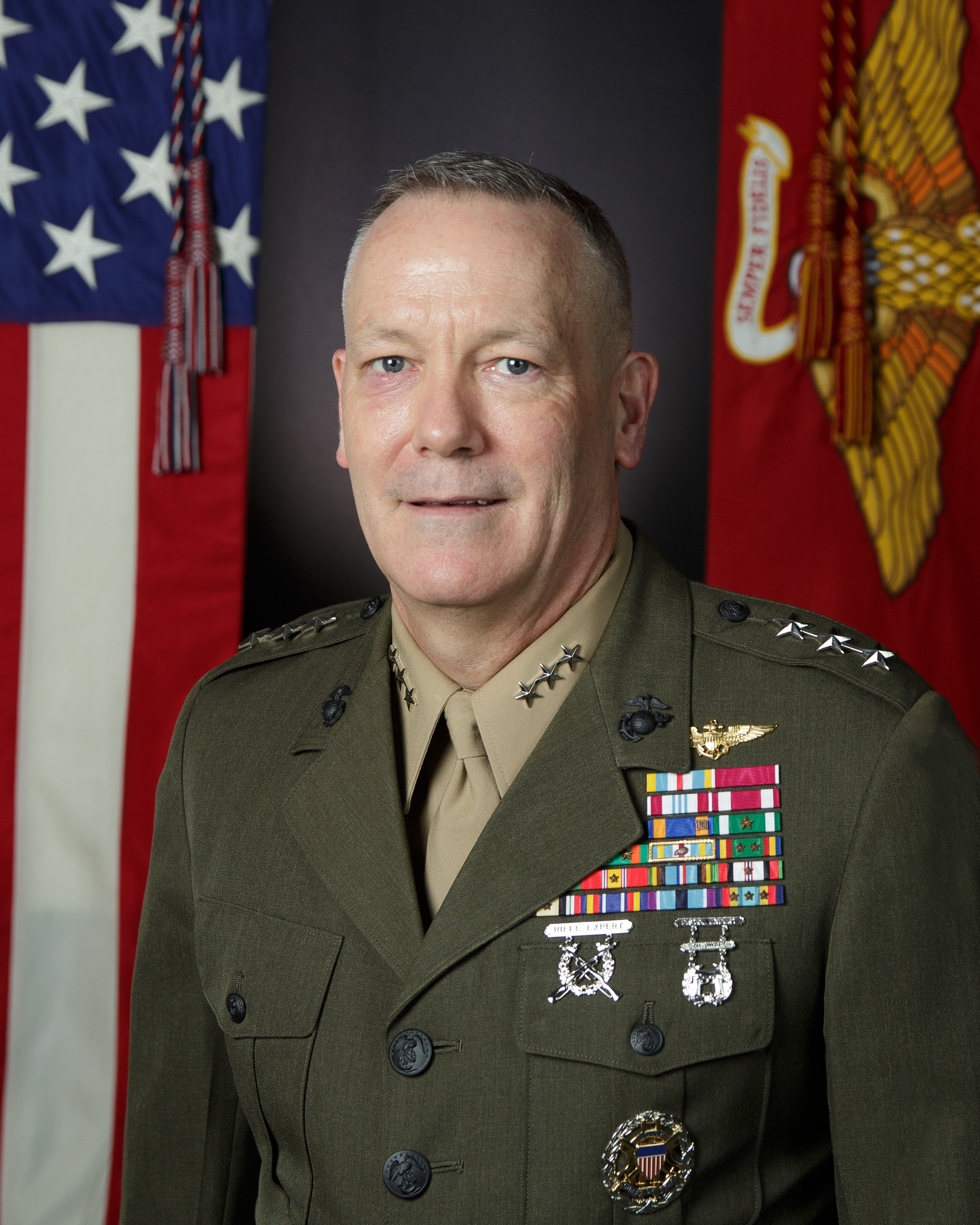
- Incumbent; Lieutenant General William H.Swan since 2 October 2025
- Reports to: Commandant of the Marine Corps
- Seat: The Pentagon, Arlington County, Virginia, U.S.
- Appointer: Commandant of the Marine Corps
- First holder: Alfred A. Cunningham
- Deputy: Assistant Deputy Commandant for Aviation

The Deputy Commandant for Aviation (DCA) is the United States Marine Corps' principal advisor on all aviation matters and is the spokesperson for Marine Corps Aviation programs, requirements, and strategy throughout the Department of the Navy and the Department of Defense. DCA is normally the highest-ranking naval aviator in the Marine Corps and reports directly to the Commandant of the Marine Corps. The role of DCA is an administrative position and has no operational command authority over United States Marine Corps Aviation forces.

DCA tour lengths have varied over the years based on war time requirements and personnel turnover. For the last two decades, typical tour lengths have been approximately three years. The billet is normally held by a lieutenant general. DCA and Headquarters Marine Corps Aviation work out of The Pentagon in Arlington County, Virginia.

== Responsibilities ==
The Deputy Commandant for Aviation is responsible for developing, integrating, and supervising plans, policies, and budgets for all aviation assets and aviation expeditionary enablers (aviation command and control, aviation-ground support, and unmanned aircraft systems) in support of Marine air ground task forces.

== History ==
The Aviation Section, Headquarters Marine Corps was established in 1919. In charge initially was the Officer in Charge, Aviation. He was responsible to both the commandant of the Marine Corps and the Director of Naval Aviation for all Marine Corps related aviation matters. In 1920, Congress authorized Marine Corps Aviation to maintain a strength of approximately one-fifth the size of the Marine Corps. In 1936 the Aviation Section was renamed the Aviation Division and the billet was changed to the Director of Aviation. In 1962 the name was again changed to Deputy Chief of Staff (Air). The current moniker of Deputy Commandant for Aviation began in June 1998.

== List of Deputy Commandants for Aviation ==
#	Picture	Name	Rank	Term			Notes
#	Picture	Name	Rank	Took office	Left office	Duration	Notes
1		Alfred A. Cunningham	Major	17 November 1919	12 December 1920	1 year, 25 days	Naval Aviator #5. He was the first Marine Corps aviator. World War I.
2		Thomas C. Turner	Lieutenant colonel	13 December 1920	2 March 1925	4 years, 79 days	Naval Aviator #772. Distinguished Flying Cross; served in the Philippines, at Veracruz and in Haiti. During WWI, at the request of Hap Arnold, served as the OinC of flying at the Army's Ellington Field.
3		Edwin H. Brainard	Major	3 March 1925	9 May 1929	4 years, 67 days	Naval Aviator #2982. Recipient of the Navy Cross for his actions during the Champagne Offensive in October 1918 while serving as the commanding officer of the 1st Battalion, 15th Field Artillery Regiment. Obtained the Marine Corps' first cargo plane in 1927.
4		Thomas C. Turner	Colonel	10 May 1929	28 October 1931	2 years, 171 days	See #2 above. The nine day gap between Col Turner and Maj Geiger was due to Col Turner being killed by a whirling propeller blade in Haiti on 28 October 1928.
5		Roy Geiger	Major	6 November 1931	29 May 1935	3 years, 204 days	Naval Aviator #49. Two time recipient of the Navy Cross. Served as the Commanding General of the 1st Marine Aircraft Wing during the Battle of Guadalcanal and Commanding General of the III Marine Amphibious Corps during the Battle of Okinawa. Also the only Marine to ever command a field army when he temporarily took command of the Tenth Army after the death of Simon Bolivar Buckner Jr.
6		Ross E. Rowell	Colonel	30 May 1935	10 March 1939	3 years, 284 days	Navy Distinguished Service Medal, Distinguished Flying Cross; Served in Nicaragua and flew at the Battle of Ocotal, was Commanding General, Marine Aircraft Wings Pacific during World War II.
7		Ralph J. Mitchell	Brigadier General	11 March 1939	29 March 1943	4 years, 18 days	Navy and Army Distinguished Service Medals; Distinguished Flying Cross from Nicaraguan Campaign.
8		Roy Geiger	Major General	13 May 1943	15 October 1943	155 days	See #5 above.
9		Louis E. Woods	Brigadier General	15 October 1943	17 July 1944	276 days	Veteran Guadalcanal Campaign, veteran Okinawa Campaign, Navy Distinguished Service Medal, Commander of the Most Excellent Order of the British Empire; commanding general, 2nd Marine Aircraft Wing
10		Field Harris	Major General	18 July 1944	24 February 1948	3 years, 221 days	Graduate U.S. Naval Academy; lieutenant general; Navy and Army Distinguished Service Medals
11		William J. Wallace	Major General	24 February 1948	1 September 1950	2 years, 189 days	Navy Distinguished Service Medal; Guadalcanal Campaign & Battle of Okinawa
12		Clayton C. Jerome	Brigadier General	1 September 1950	1 April 1952	1 year, 213 days	Retired at lieutenant general; commanded both 1st and 2d MAW; veteran of Nicaraguan Campaign, Yangtze Patrol, Solomon Islands campaign, Bougainville campaign, Philippines campaign and the Korean War.
13		William O. Brice	Lieutenant General	1 April 1952	31 July 1955	3 years, 121 days	Navy Distinguished Service Medal, Veteran of World War II, having fought at Guadalcanal, and the Korea; also served as Commanding General of Fleet Marine Force, Pacific.
14		Christian F. Schilt	Lieutenant General	1 August 1955	31 March 1957	1 year, 242 days	Medal of Honor; general; Veteran World War I, United States occupation of Haiti, United States occupation of Nicaragua, and World War II
15		Verne J. McCaul	Lieutenant General	1 April 1957	2 December 1957	245 days	Assistant Commandant of the Marine Corps; Veteran World War II and Korean War.
16		Samuel S. Jack	Major General	14 January 1958	20 February 1958	37 days	Veteran Nicaraguan Campaign, World War II and Korean War; Graduate of the U.S. Naval Academy; Recipient of the Navy Cross
17		John C. Munn	Major General	21 February 1958	14 December 1959	1 year, 296 days	Silver Star; Guadalcanal Campaign & Battle of Okinawa; Korean War
18		Albert F. Binney	Major General	15 December 1959	10 September 1961	1 year, 269 days	Veteran World War II and Korean War; commanding general 2nd Marine Aircraft Wing; graduate U.S. Naval Academy in 1928;
19		Keith B. McCutcheon	Colonel	11 September 1961	17 February 1962	159 days	General; Distinguished Flying Cross; Army Silver Star Medal; commanding officer Marine Helicopter Squadron One (HMX-1); commanding general, III Marine Amphibious Force; McCutcheon Field at MCAS New River, North Carolina is named in his honor.
20		Marion E. Carl	Colonel	18 February 1962	4 July 1962	136 days	Twice awarded the Navy Cross; Battle of Midway & Guadalcanal Campaign; Vietnam War
21		Norman J. Anderson	Brigadier General	5 July 1962	20 October 1963	1 year, 107 days	Navy Distinguished Service Medal; Distinguished Flying Cross with three gold stars; Air Medal with two silver stars; graduate UCLA
22		Louis B. Robertshaw	Major General	21 October 1963	15 June 1966	2 years, 237 days	Graduate U.S. Naval Academy; captain of the 1935 Naval Academy football team; Inspector General of the Marine Corps
23		Keith B. McCutcheon	Major General	15 June 1966	18 February 1970	3 years, 248 days	See #19 above.
24		Homer S. Hill	Major General	19 February 1970	24 August 1972	2 years, 187 days	See #19 above.
25		Edward S. Fris	Major General	25 August 1972	27 August 1974	2 years, 2 days	Lieutenant general; Veteran of World War II and Vietnam War; pioneer in the development of today's Marine Air Command and Control System (MACCS).
26		Philip D. Shutler	Brigadier General	28 August 1974	19 January 1975	144 days	Lieutenant general; Veteran of Korean War and Vietnam War.
27		Victor A. Armstrong	Major General	20 January 1975	21 August 1975	213 days	Lieutenant general; Veteran World War II; Korean War, and Vietnam War; Legion of Merit with Combat "V" and 2 gold stars; Distinguished Flying Cross with gold star
28		Thomas H. Miller Jr.	Lieutenant General	22 August 1975	29 June 1979	3 years, 311 days	First American to fly the Hawker Siddeley Harrier.
29		William J. White	Lieutenant General	1 July 1979	30 June 1982	2 years, 364 days	Veteran Korean War, and Vietnam War; Legion of Merit with Combat "V"; Distinguished Flying Cross
30		William H. Fitch	Lieutenant General	1 July 1982	31 August 1984	2 years, 61 days	Lieutenant general; Silver Star Medal
31	Lieutenant General Keith A. Smith USMC	Keith A. Smith	Lieutenant General	1 September 1984	29 April 1988	3 years, 241 days	Lieutenant general; Distinguished Flying Cross
32		Charles H. Pitman	Lieutenant General	1 July 1995	30 June 1999	3 years, 364 days	Lieutenant general; Silver Star Medal
33		Duane A. Wills	Lieutenant General	17 August 1990	30 June 1993	2 years, 317 days	Lieutenant general; Veteran Vietnam War; Distinguished Flying Cross; lettered in football at UCLA;
34		Richard D. Hearney	Lieutenant General	1 July 1993	14 July 1994	1 year, 13 days	Assistant Commandant of the Marine Corps; general; Served in the Vietnam War and Gulf War; Navy Distinguished Service Medal
35		Harold W. Blot	Lieutenant General	15 July 1994	21 July 1996	2 years, 6 days	
36		Terrence R. Dake	Lieutenant General	22 July 1996	28 June 1998	1 year, 341 days	
37		Frederick McCorkle	Lieutenant General	28 June 1998	2 August 2001	3 years, 35 days	Vietnam War
38		William L. Nyland	Lieutenant General	2 August 2001	10 September 2002	1 year, 39 days	Navy Distinguished Service Medal; Vietnam War
39		Michael A. Hough	Lieutenant General	3 October 2002	2 November 2005	3 years, 30 days	
40		John G. Castellaw	Lieutenant General	3 November 2005	10 March 2007	1 year, 127 days	
41		George J. Trautman III	Lieutenant General	5 July 2007	31 January 2011	3 years, 210 days	
42		Terry G. Robling	Lieutenant General	31 January 2011	10 March 2012	1 year, 39 days	
43		Robert E. Schmidle Jr.	Lieutenant General	31 January 2012	31 January 2014	1 year, 210 days	
44		Jon M. Davis	Lieutenant General	31 January 2014	31 July 2017	3 years, 26 days	
45		Steven R. Rudder	Lieutenant General	11 July 2017	16 July 2020	2 years, 360 days	
46		Mark R. Wise	Lieutenant General	6 July 2020	27 July 2022	2 years, 21 days	
47		Michael Cederholm	Lieutenant General	27 July 2022	16 February 2024	1 year, 204 days	
48		Bradford Gering	Lieutenant General	16 February 2024	2 October 2025	1 year, 228 days	
49		William H.Swan	Lieutenant General	2 October 2025	Incumbent	1 year, 32 days	
