= Philip D. Shutler =

United States Marine Corps general (1926–2025)

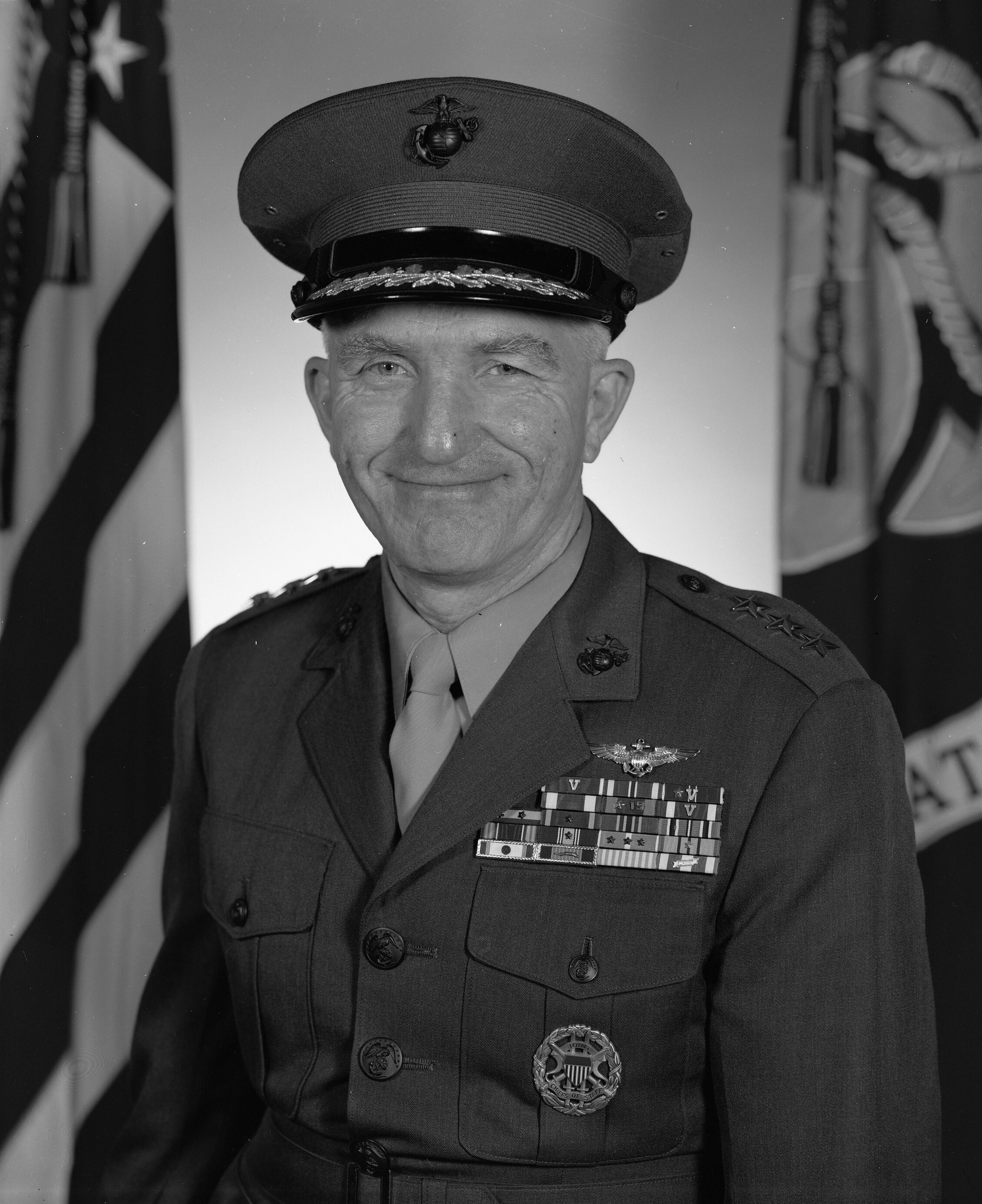
- Born: October 13, 1926; Springfield, Massachusetts, U.S.
- Died: December 12, 2025 (aged 99); Springfield, Virginia, U.S.
- Military career
- Allegiance: United States
- Branch: United States Marine Corps
- Service years: 1948–1980
- Rank: Lieutenant general
- Commands: Deputy Commandant for Aviation; director of operations, Joint Staff, J-3

Philip Dickinson Shutler (October 13, 1926 – December 12, 2025) was a lieutenant general in the United States Marine Corps. His commands included service as the Deputy Commandant for Aviation for the Marine Corps from 1974 to 1975 and Director of Operations, Joint Staff, J-3. He graduated from the United States Naval Academy in 1948. Shutler died in Springfield, Virginia on December 12, 2025, at the age of 99.
