= William H. Fitch =

United States Marine Corps general

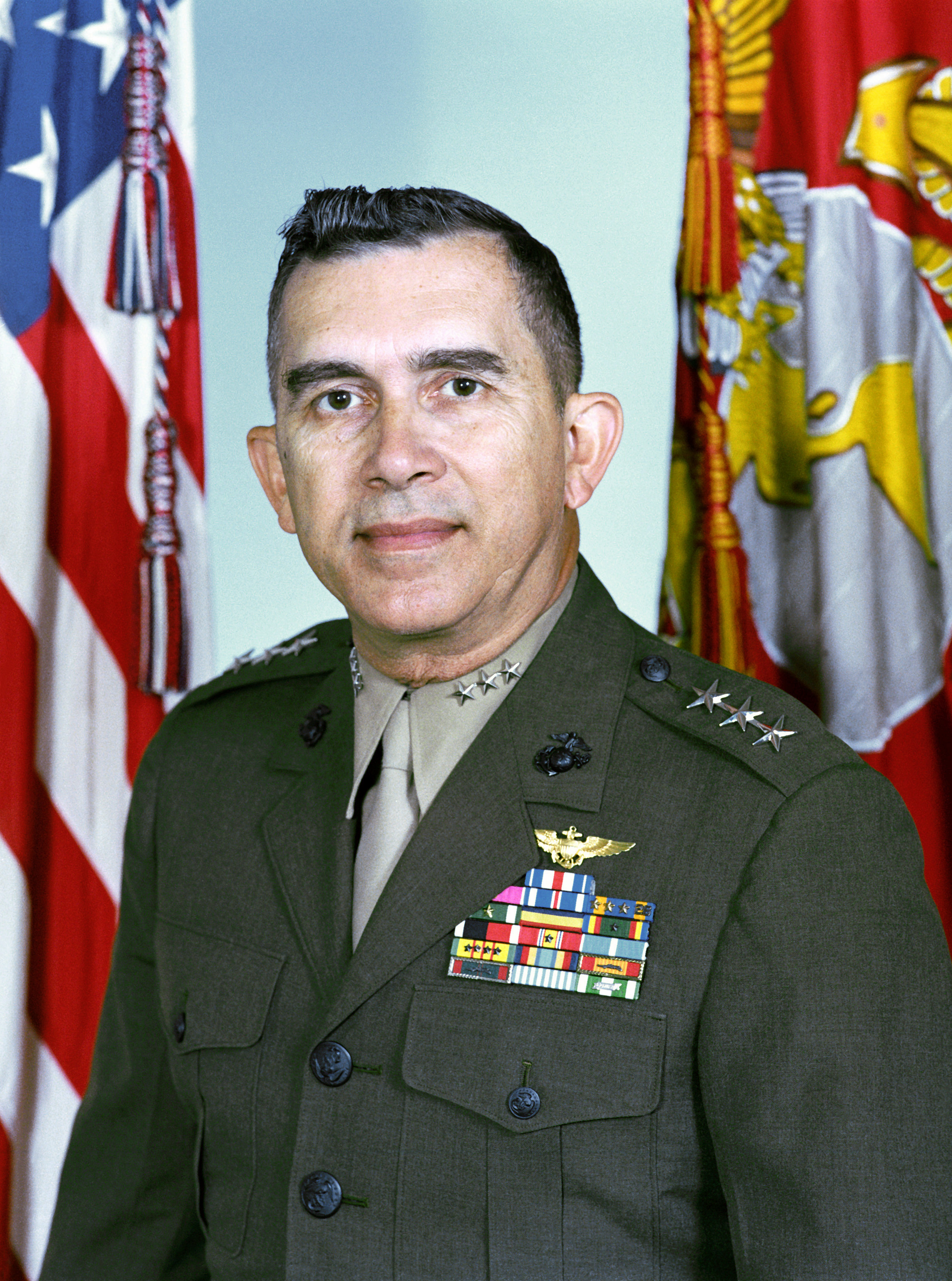
- Born: November 6, 1929; Chattanooga, Tennessee, U.S.
- Died: January 19, 2016 (aged 86); McLean, Virginia, U.S.
- Military career
- Allegiance: United States of America
- Branch: United States Marine Corps
- Service years: 1952–1984
- Rank: Lieutenant general
- Service number: 0-55351
- Commands: Deputy Commandant for Aviation; 1st Marine Aircraft Wing; 9th Marine Expeditionary Brigade; VMFA(AW)-533
- Awards: Navy Distinguished Service Medal; Silver Star; Legion of Merit (2); Distinguished Flying Cross

William Harold Fitch (November 6, 1929 – January 19, 2016) was a lieutenant general in the United States Marine Corps who served as the Deputy Commandant for Aviation for the Marine Corps.

== Marine Corps career ==
Born in Chattanooga, Tennessee, he was an alumnus of the University of Florida. Fitch was commissioned in 1952. He was one of the 32 finalists for NASA Astronaut Group 2 in 1962, but ultimately was not selected.

While commanding VMFA(AW)-533 as a lieutenant colonel during the Vietnam War, Fitch was awarded the Distinguished Flying Cross for actions in 1967 and the Silver Star Medal for actions in 1968. He was Commanding Officer of Marine Aircraft Group 14 at MCAS Cherry Point from 1972 to 1973, followed by service as Commanding Officer of the 32nd Marine Expeditionary Unit from September 1973 to July 1974. As a general officer, he was the Deputy Chief of Staff for Research and Development at Headquarters Marine Corps from 1977 to 1980, and then as Commanding General of the 1st Marine Aircraft Wing in Okinawa from June 1980 to June 1982.

After his death in 2016, Fitch was interred at Quantico National Cemetery in Virginia.

=== Silver Star citation ===
Citation:

The President of the United States of America takes pleasure in presenting the Silver Star to Lieutenant Colonel William Harold Fitch (MCSN: 0-55351), United States Marine Corps, for conspicuous gallantry and intrepidity in action while serving with Marine All Weather Attack Squadron FIVE HUNDRED THIRTY-THREE (VMA(AW)-533), FIRST Marine Aircraft Wing, in connection with combat operations against the enemy in the Republic of Vietnam. On the night of 21 February 1968, Colonel Fitch launched as the Aircraft Commander of an A-6 Intruder aircraft assigned a bombing mission against a communication installation near Hanoi in North Vietnam, an area known to be defended by heavy concentrations of automatic weapons, surface-to-air missiles, and enemy interceptor aircraft. Executing numerous turns and feints to confuse the enemy, he maneuvered his aircraft to the designated target area. Although his aircraft lost contact with all supporting aircraft, which increased the hazards from hostile antiaircraft fire, he resolutely elected to continue the mission and, guided by his complex electronic equipment, approached the target Skillfully maneuvering to evade an enemy-launched surface-to-air missile which barely cleared the canopy of his aircraft before detonating, and fully aware that his 500-foot altitude, high-speed approach precluded the possibility of a safe ejection if his aircraft were hit, Colonel Fitch dauntlessly attacked the target, delivering all ordnance with unerring accuracy. After observing a large secondary explosion, he departed the hazardous area through treacherous mountain terrain, refueled at an alternate airfield, and returned safely to the Chu Lai Air Base. By his exceptional professional skill, unfaltering determination, and courageous devotion to duty, Colonel Fitch contributed immeasurably to the accomplishment of the mission and upheld the highest traditions of the Marine Corps and the United States Naval Service.

=== Distinguished Flying Cross citation ===
Citation:

The President of the United States of America takes pleasure in presenting the Distinguished Flying Cross to Lieutenant Colonel William Harold Fitch (MCSN: 0-55351), United States Marine Corps, for heroism and extraordinary achievement while participating in aerial flight as the Commanding Officer of Marine All Weather Attack Squadron FIVE HUNDRED THIRTY-THREE (VMA(AW)-533), Marine Aircraft Group Twelve, FIRST Marine Aircraft Wing, in connection with military operations against the enemy in the Republic of Vietnam. On the night of 15 October 1967, Lieutenant Colonel Fitch launched as Flight Leader of two A-6 attack aircraft assigned a night interdiction mission against a heavily defended railroad siding and railroad bridge on a vital supply route in North Vietnam. Because of indications that an attack on one of the targets would draw more intense retaliation than the other, he carefully planned to lead the flight and employ deceptive measures to protect the second aircraft and veil its intended target as long as possible. Displaying exceptional aeronautical ability, he effectively utilized his aircraft's complex navigation system to fly through the darkness, penetrate the enemy's early warning and aircraft patrol periphery and reach the initial point of approach to the target area. Successfully employing his defensive equipment, he effectively screened the second aircraft's approach to its initial point of approach to its target. Undaunted by the enemy's integrated surface-to-air missile defense and radar-controlled anti-aircraft weapons, Lieutenant Colonel Fitch completely disregarded his own safety as he skillfully maneuvered his aircraft at high speed and low altitude over hazardous, mountainous terrain and through the heavy volume of hostile fire to reach the target. Climbing to release altitude, he delivered his ordnance with pinpoint accuracy on the railroad siding. Immediately maneuvering his aircraft into a right break to ascend up and over the mountainous terrain, he expeditiously departed the area. Meanwhile, his highly effective deceptive measures enabled the second aircraft to reach its target without receiving anti-aircraft fire. It then delivered its ordnance on the railroad bridge before the enemy could react and fire on the departing aircraft. Both aircraft delivered their bombs accurately on their designated targets, completing the strike within a thirty second time span. Lieutenant Colonel Fitch's superior airmanship, courageous leadership and selfless devotion to duty at great personal risk were instrumental in accomplishing the hazardous mission and were in keeping with the highest traditions of the Marine Corps and of the United States Naval Service.
