= Edward C. Dyer =

Brigadier General in the United States Marine Corps

Edward Colston Dyer
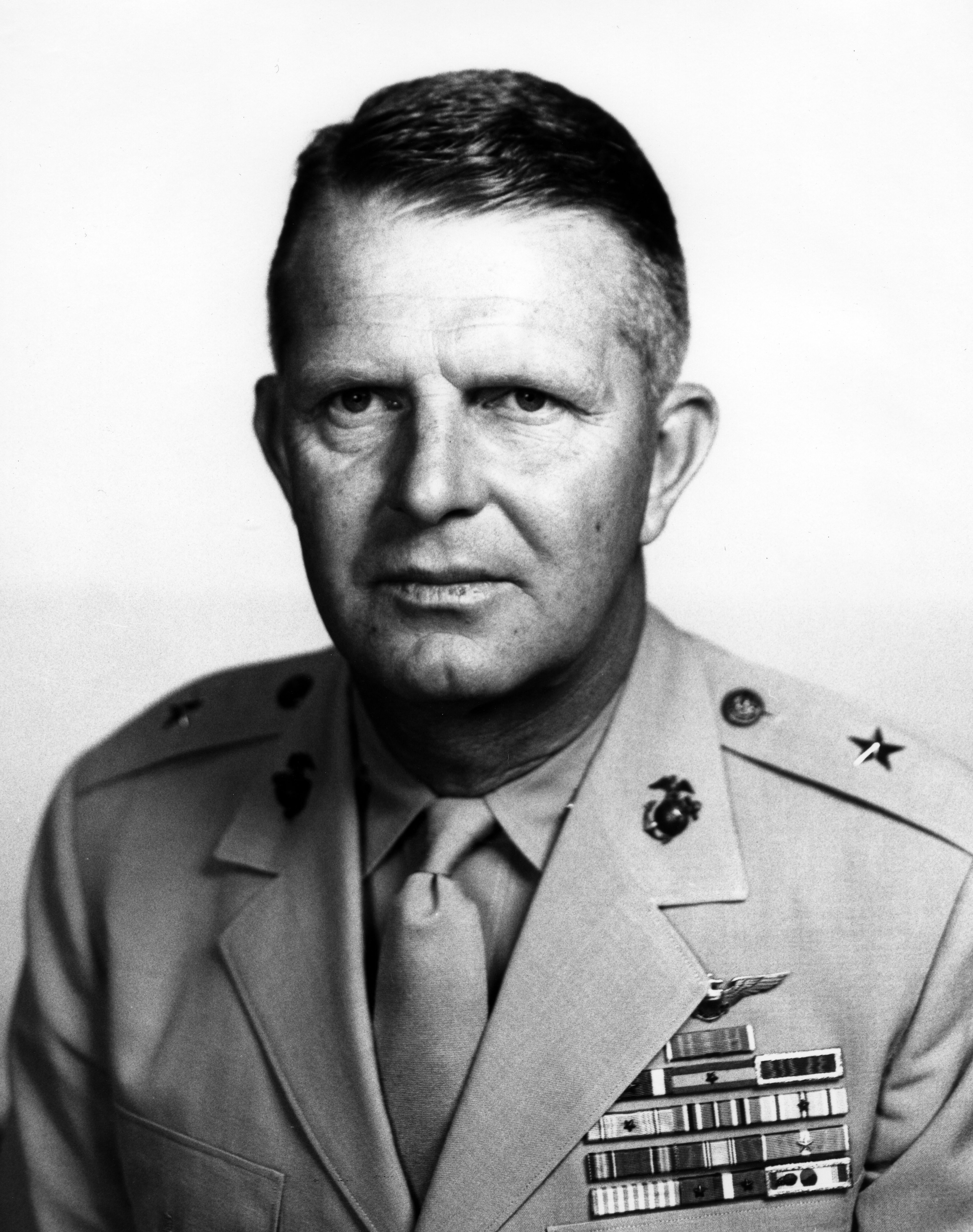
- Born: January 18, 1907; Baltimore, Maryland, US
- Died: January 5, 1975 (aged 67); New Canaan, Connecticut, US
- Burial place: Arlington National Cemetery
- Military career
- Allegiance: United States
- Branch: United States Marine Corps
- Service years: 1929-1959
- Rank: Brigadier general
- Commands: Marine Aircraft Group 61; HMX-1; Marine Aircraft Group 12; 1st Marine Expeditionary Brigade (United States); Marine Corps Air Bases, Eastern Area
- Conflicts: World War II: Philippines campaign (1944–1945); Korean War
- Awards: Legion of Merit w/ V

Edward Colston Dyer (January 18, 1907 – January 5, 1975) was a brigadier general in the United States Marine Corps who served in both World War II and the Korean War. A naval aviator and communications engineer, during his career he was a pioneer in the Marine Corps' development of early warning radar, night fighters, and helicopters.

A graduate of the United States Naval Academy, Dyer became a naval aviator and flew with various Marine Corps squadrons throughout the 1930s. After receiving a master's degree in Radio Engineering, he became the Marine Corps' leading advocate in the development of early warning radar while stationed at Headquarters Marine Corps during the first few years of World War II. For the last year of the war, he was in the Asiatic-Pacific Theater and took part in the Philippines campaign (1944–1945).

After the war, he was at the vanguard of the Marine Corps' use of helicopters. He was responsible for organizing the Marine Corps' first helicopter squadron and also became its first commanding officer. He later served as the Commanding General of the 1st Marine Expeditionary Brigade (United States) in Hawaii. Brigadier General Dyer retired in 1959 after thirty years of active service. He died in 1975 after a long illness. From 1995 until 2016, the Marine Corps Aviation Association award given annually to the top Marine Corps Medium Helicopter Squadron was named in his honor.

== Early years ==
Edward Colston Dyer was born in Baltimore, Maryland, on January 18, 1907. He graduated from the Severn School in Severna Park, Maryland, in 1924 and then attended Johns Hopkins University for one year before starting at the United States Naval Academy in 1925. He graduated from the Naval Academy on June 6, 1929, and was commissioned a second lieutenant in the United States Marine Corps that same day.

== Pre-war Marine Corps service ==
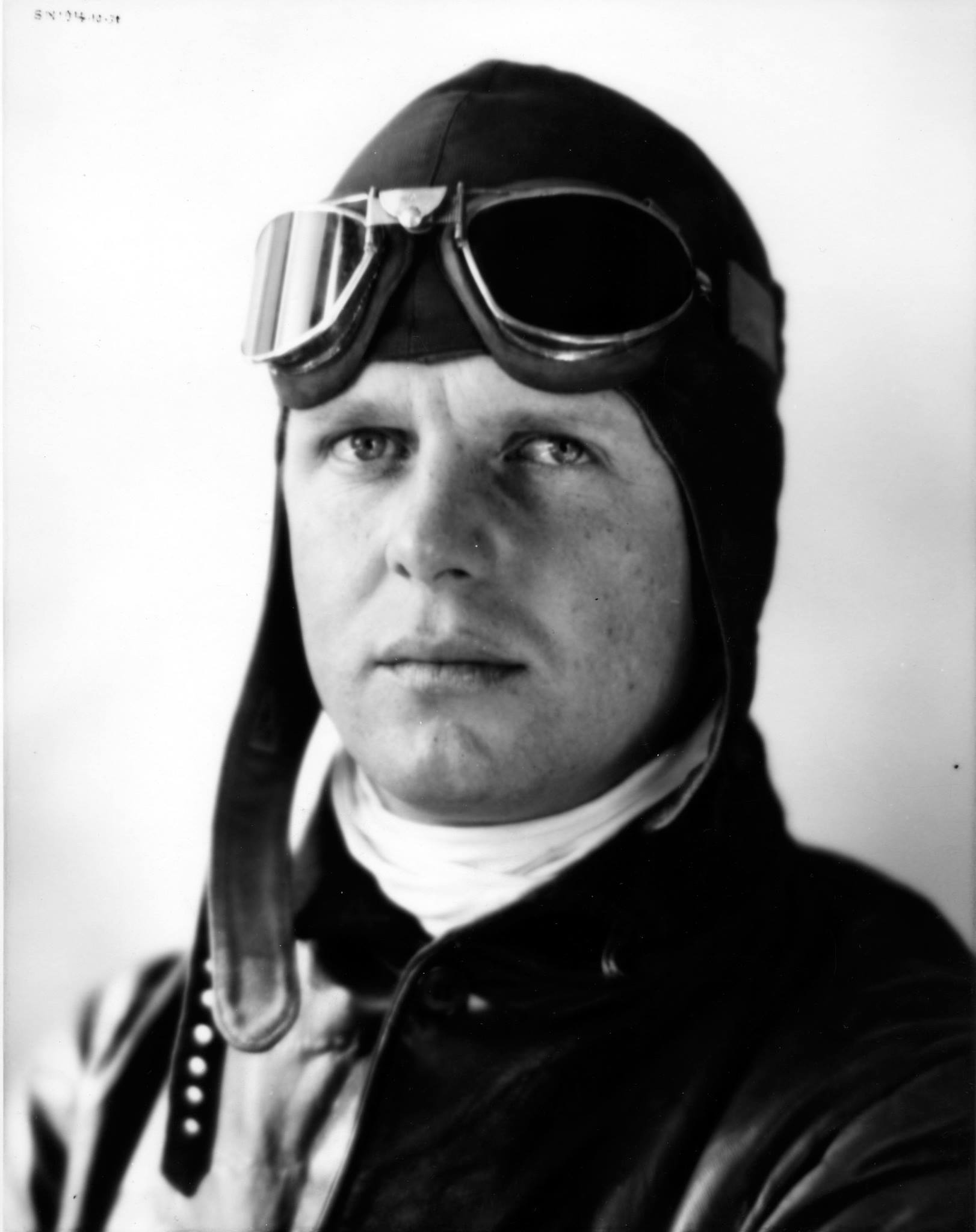
Headshot of 2ndLt Dyer taken October 15, 1931.

From June 1929 until June 1930 he attended The Basic School at Marine Barracks (Philadelphia, Pennsylvania). From June 1930 through September 1930 he began his naval aviation career at Naval Air Station Norfolk, Virginia. In September 1930 he arrived at Naval Air Station Pensacola, Florida, and received his Naval Aviation Wings on July 11, 1931. His first assignment in the Fleet Marine Force was with VO-6M as part of Aircraft Squadrons, East Coast Expeditionary Force at Marine Corps Base Quantico, Virginia. From September–November 1931 he served with VS-14M on board the USS Saratoga (CV-3). This was followed by another at-sea tour with VS-15M on board the USS Lexington (CV-2) from November 1931 through July 1933. He returned to MCB Quantico in July 1933 to fly with VF-9M as part of Aircraft One.

From June 1936 through July 1938 he began his post-graduate education at the United States Naval Academy. While completing his masters studies he married Frances Montague Hill on September 11, 1937, in Huntley, Virginia. In August 1938 he transferred to the University of California, Berkeley for his final year where he received a Master of Science in Radio Engineering. From June 1939 until May 1940 he attended the Junior Course at Marine Corps Schools in MCB Quantico, VA. He was next assigned to Marine Air Group 1 (MAG-1) where he took part in numerous prewar landing exercises until April 1941.

== World War II ==
As World War II raged in Europe, the Marine Corps' Director of Aviation at Headquarters Marine Corps, MajGen Ralph J. Mitchell, sent a couple of his best officers to Europe and North Africa to accrue lessons learned and best practices from the British as they engaged with the Luftwaffe. In April 1941 then Capt Dyer, travelling as the aide of Brigadier General Ross E. Rowell, left San Francisco heading west via the China Clipper on their way to Cairo and England. Along the way they had dinner with the wife of the first President of the Philippines Emilio Aguinaldo, drank Bloody Mary's with Ernest Hemingway and Emily “Mickey” Hahn in Hong Kong, attended a state dinner in Chungking hosted by H.H. Kung the wealthiest man in China, got stuck in Basrah, Iraq during a revolt by Rashid Ali, and flew across Africa with the future founder of the State of Israel David Ben-Gurion. While in Egypt observing British operations, Dyer contracted yellow jaundice and dengue fever and had to be hospitalized for a month in a British Army hospital in Cairo.

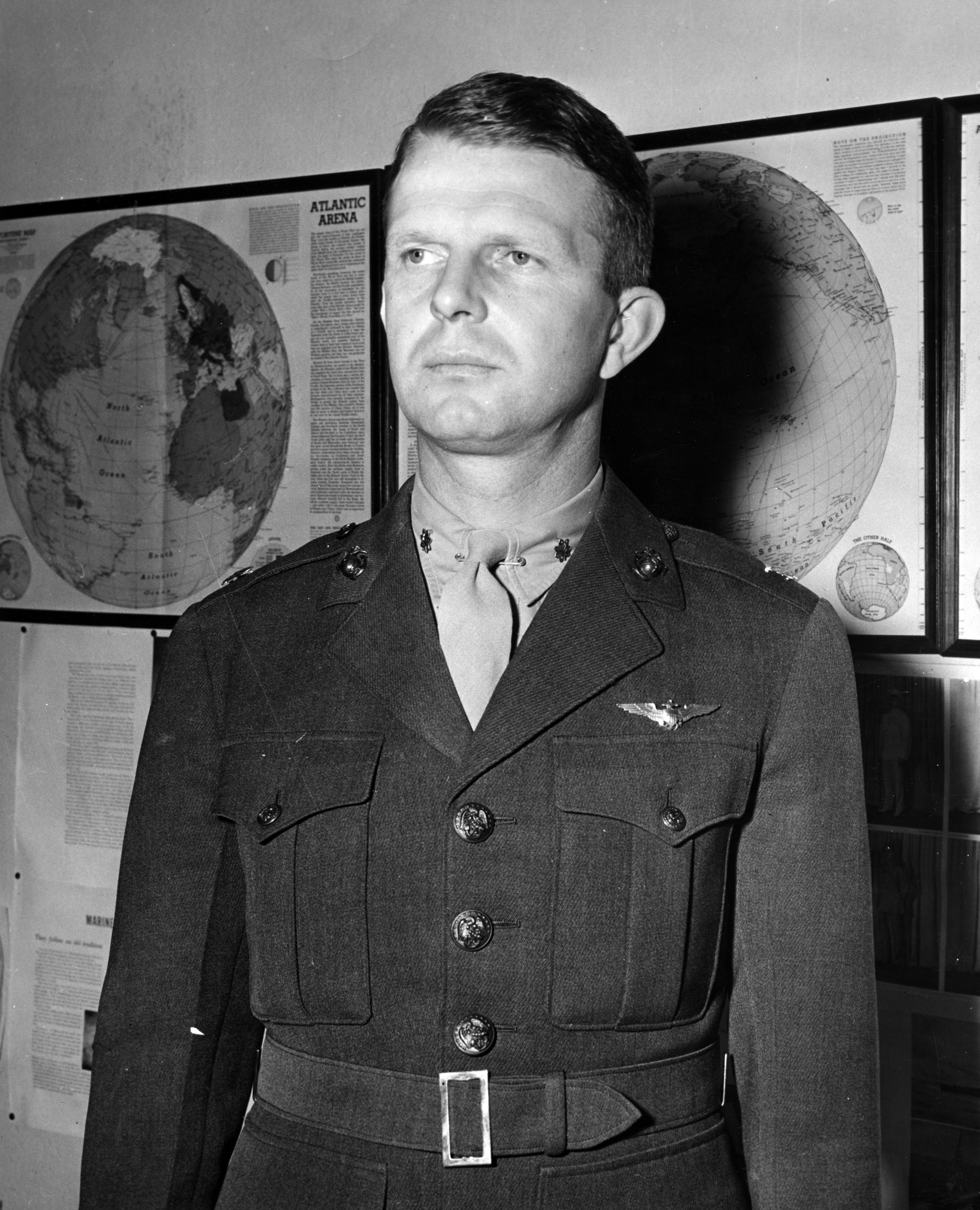
Edward Dyer while working at Headquarters Marine Corps Aviation during World War II.

Once recovered, he caught up with BGen Rowell in London and then he enrolled in a three-week course for fighter controllers at RAF Stanmore Park where, for the first time, he was given detailed information about the use of radar. Dyer next attended a British radar school and stood watches, as an observer, at various Fighter Command stations and ground control intercept stations, so as to become well indoctrinated into the British system of fighter control.

Returning to the United States in October 1941, Captain Dyer was assigned to Headquarters Marine Corps Aviation. He is probably most responsible for the development of an independent Air Warning Program in the Marine Corps. He knew that the essential element for any day/night air defense capability was a robust system of ground based radar. One of his first official tasks was to brief then Commandant of the Marine Corps (CMC) LtGen Thomas Holcomb on what he had seen in England and what he recommended going forward. When he informed CMC that the current purchase of 12 x SCR-268 radars for the defense battalions was not sufficient and that they would need a mix of 50+ radars at a minimum, the Commandant replied, “Gee whiz, that an awful lot.” He left that meeting having not been told no, so newly promoted Major Dyer immediately piggy backed onto an existing US Army purchase and placed an order, sight unseen, for 23 million dollars’ worth of VHF radios, VHF direction finding equipment, IFF equipment and GCI radars. Dyer was also responsible for the Marine Corps establishing a radar school at MCB Quantico in the summer of 1942.

In February 1943 the Commandant of the Marine Corps convened a "Radar Policy Board" headed by LtCol Walter L. J. Bayler of which Dyer was an also a member. The board was tasked with making recommendations regarding the establishment of a program for radar early warning, radar fire control and radar fighter direction for Marine Corps units during amphibious operations. Board recommendations included the organization of air warning squadrons and groups, placing organic fighter direction with night fighter squadrons and the creation of an Air Defense Section within the Division of Aviation at Headquarters Marine Corps. The findings of the report were endorsed by the Commandant of the Marine Corps in May 1943 and subsequently the 1st Marine Air Warning Group was established at MCAS Cherry Point, North Carolina as part of the 3rd Marine Aircraft Wing on 1 July 1943.

Dyer's time in England opened his eyes to the fact that no service in the United States had anything comparable to the British system of radar and fighter control. Because of this he then set to work with Major Frank Schwable to secure funding, manpower and aircraft for the Marine Corps night fighter program. This effort culminated in the Marine Corps commissioning its first night fighter squadron, VMF(N)-531, on November 16, 1942.

His tour at HQMC ended in July 1944 and Col Dyer was transferred to the Pacific Theater where his first assignment was as the operations officer for the Strategic Air Force from December 1944 through March 1945. His next stint was a special assignment with Marine Aircraft Group 21 and the United States Army Air Corps on Guam. After that he served as the Chief of Staff to the Commander, Air, Northern Solomons and his final position overseas was as the Commanding Officer of Marine Aircraft Group 61 in the Philippines from September through December 1945.

== Helicopters and Korea ==
Following the war Dyer served as the commanding officer of the Marine Corps Aviation Technical School at Marine Corps Base Quantico. Beginning in September 1946 he served as a secretary on a Marine Corps Board tasked with determining "the broad concepts and principles which the Marine Corps should follow, and the major steps which it should take, to fit it to wage successful amphibious warfare at some future date." From July to November 1947 he simultaneously learned to fly helicopters at the Sikorsky Aircraft in Stratford, Connecticut, while helping to stand up a Helicopter Development Squadron at MCB Quantico. On December 1, 1947, Colonel Dyer became the first commanding officer of the Marine Corps' first helicopter squadron. Marine Helicopter Squadron 1, formed at Marine Corps Air Station Quantico, was tasked with developing tactics, techniques, and procedures for the use of helicopters during amphibious operations. In May 1948, HMX-1, under Dyer's stewardship, conducted the first ever ship-to-shore helicopter lift in military history during Operation PACKARD II. Flying the Sikorshy HO3S-1, the squadron shuttled 66 marines from the USS Palau to Onslow Beach on Marine Corps Base Camp Lejeune, North Carolina. The lessons learned from PACKARD II were utilized by Colonel Dyer and Col Brute Krulak for the manual they co-wrote on the use of helicopters to support amphibious operations titled Amphibious Operations: Employment of Helicopters. He remained as the CO of HMX-1 until June 1949 when he transferred to Marine Corps Air Station El Toro, California. He took command of Marine Aircraft Group 12 (MAG-12) on August 10, 1949, and remained i this position until May 14, 1950. After command in May 1950 he became the operations officer for the 1st Marine Aircraft Wing (1st MAW).

Dyer deployed with 1st MAW to Korea in July 1950. He served as the Deputy Chief of Staff for Close Air Support with the Tenth Army and as the operations officer for the 1st Marine Aircraft Wing. For his service in Korea he was awarded a Legion of Merit.

== D.C., Hawaii and final years of service ==
From August 1951 until June 1952 Dyer attended the National War College in Washington D.C. Following school he served as the Deputy Assistant Director of the Division of Aviation from July 1952 til September 1954. In October 1954 he became the Commanding General of the 1st Marine Brigade at Marine Corps Air Station Kaneohe Bay, Hawaii; however, he was not promoted to brigadier general until May 1955. In July 1956 he was assigned back to Washington, D.C., as the assistant director of aviation. On July 1, 1957, he became the commander of Marine Corps Air Bases, Eastern Area, with the additional role of commanding general of Marine Corps Air Station Cherry Point.

== Retirement, death, and legacy ==
Dyer retired from the Marine Corps on February 1, 1959. From 1959 until 1970 he was an executive with Sikorsky Aircraft in Stratford, Connecticut. He died on January 5, 1975, in New Canaan, Connecticut, after an extended illness. His funeral services were held on February 9 at Fort Myer, Virginia, and he was buried at Arlington National Cemetery. At the time of his death, he was survived by his wife Frances and their two daughters Katherine and Ellen.

== Medals and decorations ==
Here is the ribbon bar of Brigadier General Edward C. Dyer:
