= Duane A. Wills =

United States Marine Corps general

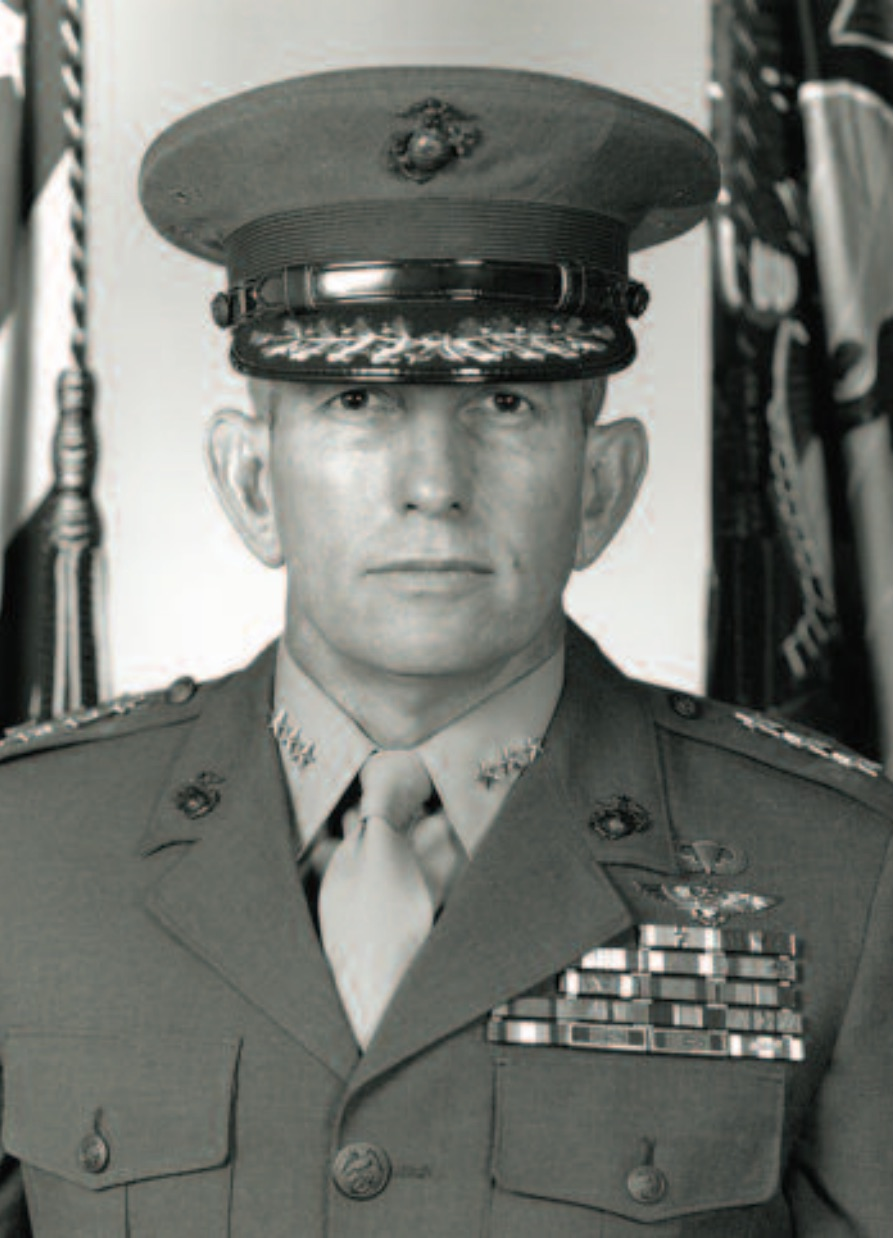
- Born: March 10, 1939; Independence, Missouri, U.S.
- Died: May 21, 2007 (aged 68); Tucson, Arizona, U.S.
- Military career
- Allegiance: United States
- Branch: United States Marine Corps
- Service years: 1961–1993
- Rank: Lieutenant general
- Commands: Deputy Commandant for Aviation

Duane A. Wills (March 10, 1939 – May 21, 2007) was a lieutenant general in the United States Marine Corps who served as Deputy Commandant for Aviation for the Marine Corps from 1990 to 1993. A graduate of the University of California, Los Angeles, he was commissioned in 1961 and retired in 1993. He retired in 1993 and died in Tucson, Arizona in 2007.
