= 9th Marine Expeditionary Brigade =

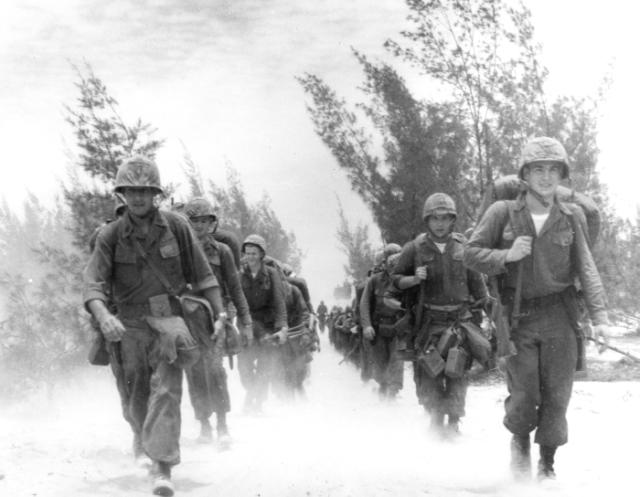
- 9th MEB during the Vietnam War
- Country: United States of America
- Branch: United States Marine Corps
- Type: MAGTF
- Engagements: Vietnam War; Operation Osage; Operation Deckhouse IV; Operation Deckhouse V; Operation Deckhouse VI; Operation Beacon Hill; Operation Beacon Star; Operation Beaver Cage; Operation Beau Charger

Commanders
- Notable commanders: Frederick J. Karch; Michael P. Ryan

The 9th Marine Expeditionary Brigade was a United States Marine Corps unit.

== History ==
=== 1965 ===
Following the Gulf of Tonkin Incident in August 1964, the 9th Marine Expeditionary Brigade (9th MEB) was activated by United States Pacific Command under Admiral Ulysses S. Grant Sharp. The 3rd Marine Division assistant commander and Medal of Honor recipient, Brigadier General Raymond G. Davis, was appointed its first commander. It consisted of 9th Marine Regiment regimental headquarters and three battalion landing teams (BLT). Almost 6,000 men were transformed into an effective force in readiness.

When the Gulf of Tonkin crisis faded, one BLT was sent to Okinawa, another to the Philippines and a third one was served afloat as Special Landing Force of the Seventh Fleet under Admiral Roy L. Johnson. The skeleton headquarters of the brigade under BGen Davis remained at U.S. Naval Base Subic Bay for case of emergency and BGen John P. Coursey relieved Davis on 16 October 1964.

Meanwhile the situation in South Vietnam became critical, when Viet Cong (VC) forces won the Battle of Binh Gia at the beginning of January 1965 and it became obvious that this was an intensive military challenge which the South Vietnamese government could not meet with its own resources.

BGen Frederick J. Karch assumed command of the brigade on 22 January 1965 and 1st and 3rd Battalions, 9th Marines took part in the amphibious landing exercise. On 7 February 1965, the VC attacked the U.S. base in Pleiku killing 9 Americans, wounding 128 others and damaging or destroying 25 aircraft. President Lyndon B. Johnson ordered the deployment of 9th MEB to Da Nang by the end of February 1965 with the mission of protecting the Da Nang Air Base from enemy incursion.

After initial delay because of negotiations with South Vietnamese government, Karch led his brigade ashore on 8 March 1965 on Red Beach. The 9th MEB was subsequently reinforced by the 2nd Battalion, 9th Marines. Johnson also permitted a change of mission for the 9th MEB which would allow the use of Marines "in active combat under conditions to be established and approved by the Secretary of Defense in consultation with the Secretary of State." The Brigade absorbed the Marine Aircraft Group 16 and conducted defense duty at Da Nang for next two months. However, with the increasing number of Marine forces in South Vietnam, the 9th MEB was deactivated on 6 May 1965 and reorganized as the III Marine Amphibious Force under Major General William R. Collins.

=== 1966 ===
The unit was reactivated on 1 March 1966 as 9th Marine Amphibious Brigade (9th MAB) on Okinawa, Japan with Colonel Herman Hansen Jr. as temporary commander. The brigade was designated Special Landing Force of the Seventh Fleet. BGen William A. Stiles arrived on 30 March and assumed command of the brigade. Colonel Hansen Jr. was appointed brigade's chief of staff. The Brigade was composed of Headquarters and the Headquarters Company, Regimental Landing Team 5, Battalion Landing Team 2nd Battalion, 5th Marines and Sub Unit Two, Headquarters&Service Company, 1st Service Battalion. The Brigade received its air unit, Marine Aircraft Group 13 (Reinforced) on 15 April 1966 and now was responsible for most Marine air and ground units in the Western Pacific outside of Vietnam. BG Michael P. Ryan relieved BGen Stiles as commanding General on that date.

Regimental Landing Team 5 was relieved by newly organized 26th Marine Regiment and the 9th MAB participated in Operation Osage between 27 April and 3 May 1966. The 9th MAB was assigned to the mission of destroying a VC battalion and elements of a People's Army of Vietnam (PAVN) regiment reported to be operating in Thừa Thiên-Huế Province. The results were inconclusive with 8 VC killed while Marine losses were eight killed and 9 wounded.

The 9th MAB provided Battalion Landing Team (BLT) of 1st Battalion, 26th Marines for Operation Deckhouse IV from 15–18 September 1966. The 9th MAB's Marines killed over 200 PAVN soldiers from 90th Regiment with the loss of 36 Marines. During the rest of the year, the 9th MAB and its units were stationed off the northern coast of South Vietnam in order to provide force for the defense of Vietnam Demilitarized Zone in case of emergency.

=== 1967 ===
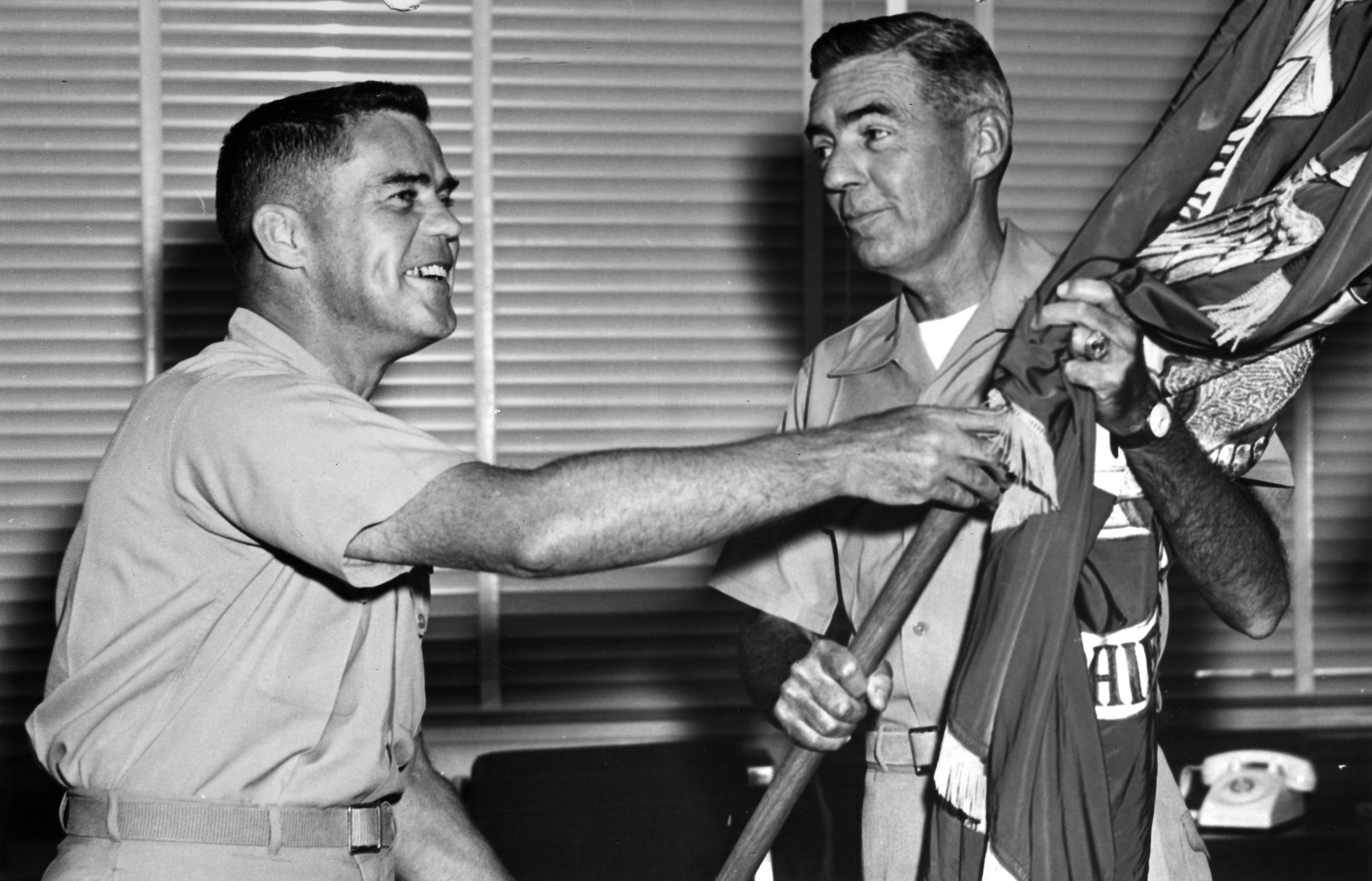
BrigGen. William C. Chip (left) hands over the colors of 9th MAB to BrigGen. John E. Williams during the change of command ceremony on August 12, 1968.

BGen Louis Metzger assumed command of the 9th MAB on 4 January 1967 and led it during Operation Deckhouse V in Bến Tre Province a few days later. The Battalion Landing Team 1/9, now assigned to the 9th MAB, took part in the operation, but due to forewarning, the VC left the area before the attack. The units of 9th MAB killed only 21 VC and lost 7 Marines.

III Marine Amphibious Force (III MAF) launched Operation Desoto on 27 January 1967 against known VC strongholds in the region. The 9th MAB launched the Operation Deckhouse VI on 16 February in order to disrupt enemy movement in the vicinity of Sa Huynh salt flats, search northward in the Nui Dat area, and, finally, link up with the 3rd Battalion, 7th Marines, then operating around Nui Dat in Operation Desoto. BLT 1/4 confirmed the presence of VC in the area, but enemy concentrated only on delaying and harassing tactics. BLT 1/4 destroyed 167 fortifications and captured 20 tons of assorted supplies during the 32 days of Phase I of Operation Deckhouse VI. Though there never were any major contacts, the BLT claimed 201 VC killed during this period; only 6 Marines died. On 27 February, Phase II of Deckhouse VI started, but there was only occasional contact with the enemy and intermittent sniper fire marked the only enemy reactions. In the six days required to accomplish the Phase II, the battalion killed 78 more VC, destroyed 145 fortifications, and captured an additional five tons of supplies. Similarly, as in Phase I, 6 Marines died.

Because of a growing threat to Firebase Gio Linh, III MAF launched Operation Beacon Hill on 20 March 1967. BLT 1/4 and Marine Helicopter Transport Squadron 363 were ordered for the mission. The contact with the enemy was light until 21 March, when the BLT 1/4 engaged about 80 PAVN troops, killing 14 of them. The next day the battalion made contact again between Gio Linh and Con Thien. After a stiff fight the PAVN, apparently a company, withdrew leaving 43 bodies behind. Progress during both days was slow because the PAVN laced their positions with connecting tunnels which required detailed search. On 26 March, after two days of air and artillery preparation, BLT 1/4 broke through two well-prepared defensive trench lines and cleared the interconnecting tunnel system. The PAVN subsequently withdrew and only sniper fire and minor rear guard actions slowed the advancing Marines. The operation ended on 1 April and BLT 1/4 suffered 29 Marines killed and 230 wounded. The PAVN lost 334 men.

Following Operation Beacon Hill, 1/4 Marines was transferred back to the 3rd Marine Division and 9th MAB's Special Landing Force (SLF) was reorganized into twin concept: SLF Alpha, which consisted of HMM-263 and the 1st Battalion, 3rd Marines and SLF Bravo formed with 2nd Battalion, 3rd Marines and HMM-164. The landing exercise at Kin Blue Beach, Okinawa followed during April 1967, where the 9th MAB practiced a combined surface and helicopter assault.

Metzger's units subsequently participated in Operation Beacon Star between 22 April and 12 May 1967, where he could test SLF new concept. The main target of the operation was a VC stronghold and supply area along the border of Quang Tri and Thua Thien Provinces. Intelligence officers reported two battalions of the VC 6th Regiment and two main force battalions, the 810th and the 814th, were operating in the region. Due to bad weather and poor visibility, SLF Bravo launched a combined helicopter and overland assault which killed 940 VC with Marine losses of 71 killed and 349 wounded.

Simultaneously with Operation Beacon Star, the 9th MAB took part in the Operation Beaver Cage between 28 April and 13 May 1967. SLF Alpha containing BLT 1/3 and HMM-263 and its mission was to clear Que Son Valley, 25 miles (40 km) southwest of Da Nang, important to the VC as a source of both food and manpower. The SLF Alpha casualties totaled 55 Marines killed and 151 wounded, but in 16 days of continuous operations the BLT claimed 181 VC dead and 66 prisoners.

== Commanding generals ==
- BGen. Raymond G. Davis (6 August 1964 – 16 October 1964)
- BGen. John P. Coursey (16 October 1964 – 22 January 1965)
- BGen. Frederick J. Karch (22 January 1965 – 6 May 1965) (Deactivated)
- Col. Herman Hansen Jr. (1 March 1966 – 29 March 1966) (Reactivated as 9th Marine Amphibious Brigade)
- BGen. William A. Stiles (30 March 1966 – 14 April 1966)
- BGen. Michael P. Ryan (15 April 1966 – 4 January 1967)
- BGen. Louis Metzger (4 January 1967 – 18 May 1967)
- BGen. Jacob E. Glick (19 May 1967 – 21 January 1968)
- BGen. William C. Chip (22 January 1968 – 11 August 1968)
- BGen. John E. Williams (12 August 1968 – 12 June 1969)
- BGen. Robert B. Carney Jr. (13 June 1969 – 7 November 1969)
- BGen. Edward J. Miller (3 April 1972 – 15 November 1972)
- BGen. Paul G. Graham (16 November 1972 – 9 February 1973) (Deactivated)
- BGen. Richard E. Carey (1 April 1975 – 30 April 1975)
- BGen. James D. Beans (10 May 1984 – 1 July 1985)

== See also ==
- Marine Air-Ground Task Force
- Organization of the United States Marine Corps
- Marine Expeditionary Brigade
