= William C. Chip =

American Major general (1919–1992)

William Charles Chip
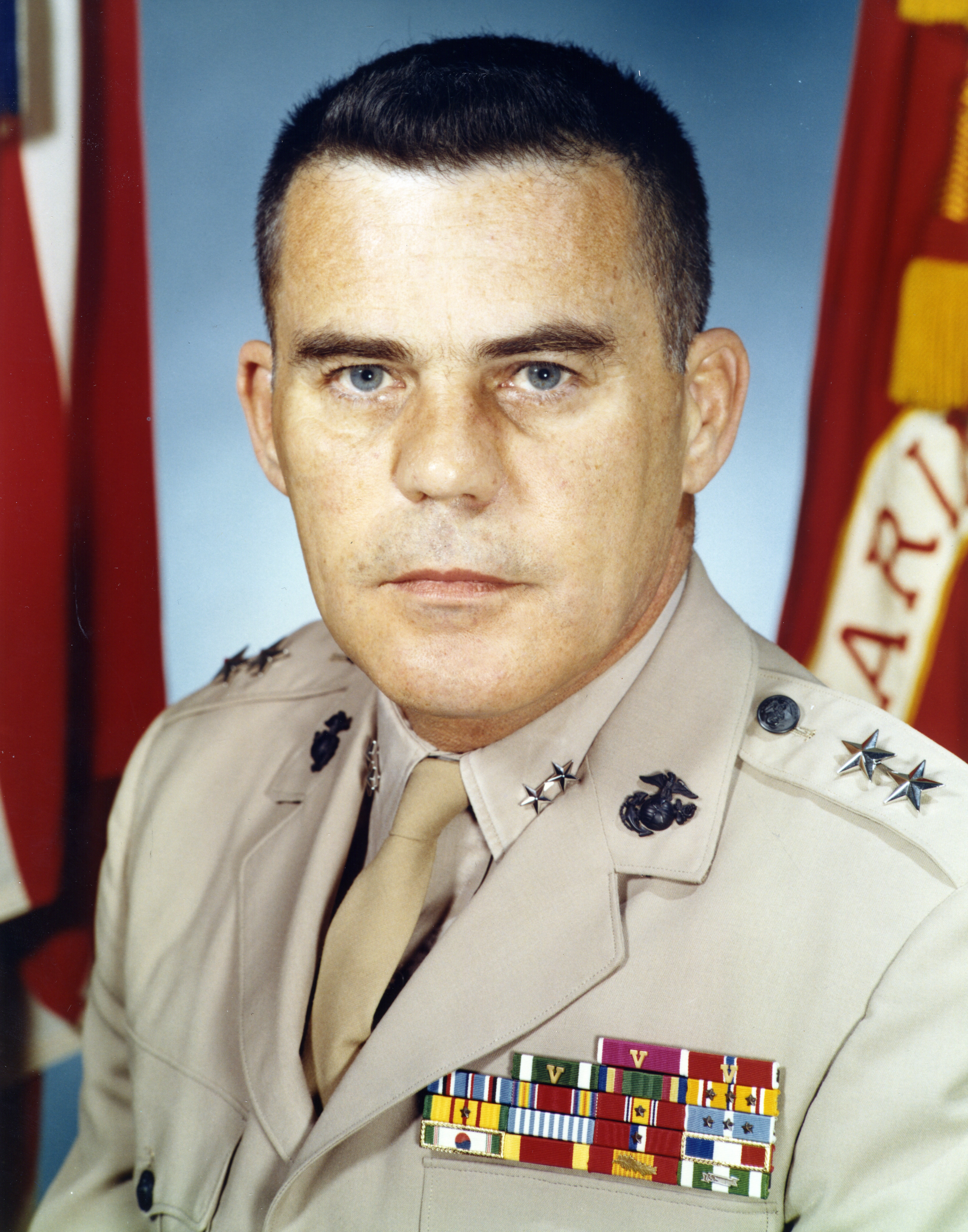
- MG William C. Chip
- Born: July 25, 1919; New Castle, Pennsylvania, U.S.
- Died: June 16, 1992 (aged 72); Vero Beach, Florida, U.S.
- Burial place: Arlington National Cemetery
- Relatives: George Chip (father)
- Military career
- Allegiance: United States
- Branch: United States Marine Corps
- Service years: 1942–1972
- Rank: Major general
- Service number: 0-10939
- Commands: Quartermaster General of the USMC; 9th Amphibious Brigade; 1st Battalion, 1st Marines; 1st Reconnaissance Battalion
- Conflicts: World War II: Battle of Saipan; Battle of Guam; Battle of Peleliu; Battle of Leyte; Korean War: Battle of Bunker Hill; First Battle of the Hook; Vietnam War: Operation Scotland II
- Awards: Legion of Merit (2); Bronze Star Medal; Navy Commendation Medal

William Charles Chip (July 25, 1919 – June 16, 1992) was a decorated officer in the United States Marine Corps with the rank of major general. A veteran of three wars, Chip distinguished himself as battalion executive officer in Korea and later as commanding general, Task Force Hotel during Vietnam War.

His tour in Southeast Asia ended prematurely, when his helicopter crashed shortly after takeoff. Following his recovery, Chip served as Quartermaster General of the Marine Corps between August 1971 – July 1972. He was the son of the World Middleweight Champion, George Chip.

== Early career and World War II ==
William C. Chip was born on July 25, 1919, in New Castle, Pennsylvania, as the son of the World Middleweight Champion (1913–14), George Chip and his wife Katharine. Young William graduated from the New Castle High School in summer 1937, when he enrolled the Duquesne University in Pittsburgh. Chip remained at Duquesne for one year and a half, before received an appointment to the United States Naval Academy at Annapolis, Maryland in May 1939.

While at the academy, Chip was active in the football team and played as quarterback under famous coach Swede Larson in season 1940–1941. He was nicknamed "Bill" by classmates. His class graduated prematurely due to course of War and Chip was commissioned second lieutenant in the Marine Corps on June 19, 1942. He was subsequently ordered to the Marine Corps Schools, Quantico for the Artillery course, which he completed two months later.

Chip was then ordered to Guantánamo Bay, Cuba, where he assumed duty as battery commander within 13th Defense Battalion, which was established for the defense of the harbor against enemy ships and aircraft. During his time in Cuba, he was promoted successively to first lieutenant and captain and returned to the United States in early 1944.

In May 1944, Chip was assigned to the light cruiser Honolulu as commander of the Marine detachment aboard. The Honolulu then participated in the naval operations and bombardment of Saipan and Guam in the Mariana Islands; Peleliu in the Palaus; and Leyte in the Philippines and Chip returned to the United States in early 1946.

== Postwar service and Korea ==
Upon his return stateside, Chip served briefly with the Division of Reserve at the Headquarters Marine Corps in Washington, D.C., before he was transferred to Indianapolis, Indiana for duty as Inspector-Instructor, 16th Reserve Infantry Battalion. He was responsible for the training of Marine Reservists in that area until May 1949, when he returned to Marine Corps Base Quantico, Virginia for duty as an instructor at the Marine Corps Schools. While at Quantico, Chip also held additional duty as assistant coach of Quantico Marines Devil Dogs football for seasons 1949–1950. While in these capacities, he was promoted to major.

In April 1952, Chip was transferred to Camp Pendleton, California, where he joined the 1st Replacement Battalion. He was ordered to South Korea one month later and joined the 1st Battalion, 1st Marines as battalion executive officer. His battalion was deployed on the main line of resistance, the Jamestown Line, which consisted of a series of defensive positions, bunkers, and outposts. During October of that year, the Chinese People's Volunteer Army launched a series of attacks on U.N. positions and Chip distinguished himself several times. He remained in Korea until June 1953, and received the Bronze Star Medal and Navy Commendation Medal, both with a Combat "V" for his service.

Following his return to the United States, Chip was ordered to the Marine Corps Schools, Quantico, for Junior course, which he completed in June 1954 and was ordered to the Headquarters Marine Corps as head, Individual Training Unit in the Operations Division. While in this capacity, he was promoted to lieutenant colonel in December 1954.

In July 1957, Chip was transferred to Camp Pendleton, where he assumed command of 1st Reconnaissance Battalion attached to 1st Marine Division under Major General David M. Shoup. He served in that capacity until August 1958, when he was transferred to the divisional staff under new commanding general Edward W. Snedeker and served as assistant operations officer (G-3) until January 1959.

He was subsequently appointed commanding officer, 1st Battalion, 1st Marines, the battalion designated to be the first unit to effect the Unit Transplacement Program between the 1st and 3rd Marine Division. His tour with 1st Marine Division ended in June 1960, when Chip was ordered back to the East Coast and joined the Marine Corps Schools, Quantico, as assistant for Expeditionary Force Operations in the Ground Combat Section at the Marine Corps Landing Force Development Center. Chip served directly under Brigadier General John C. Miller Jr. and was co-responsible for the development and testing of new tactics, equipment and techniques for the Marine Corps.

Upon detachment of general Miller in June 1962, Chip entered the Senior Course at the Marine Corps Schools, Quantico, and graduated the following June. He was promoted colonel at his graduation and departed for Washington, D.C., where he joined the office of United States Under Secretary of the Navy. Chip served as aide and special assistant for Marine Corps matters to Undersecretary Paul B. Fay for two years, before he departed for a new assignment in Europe.

== Vietnam War ==
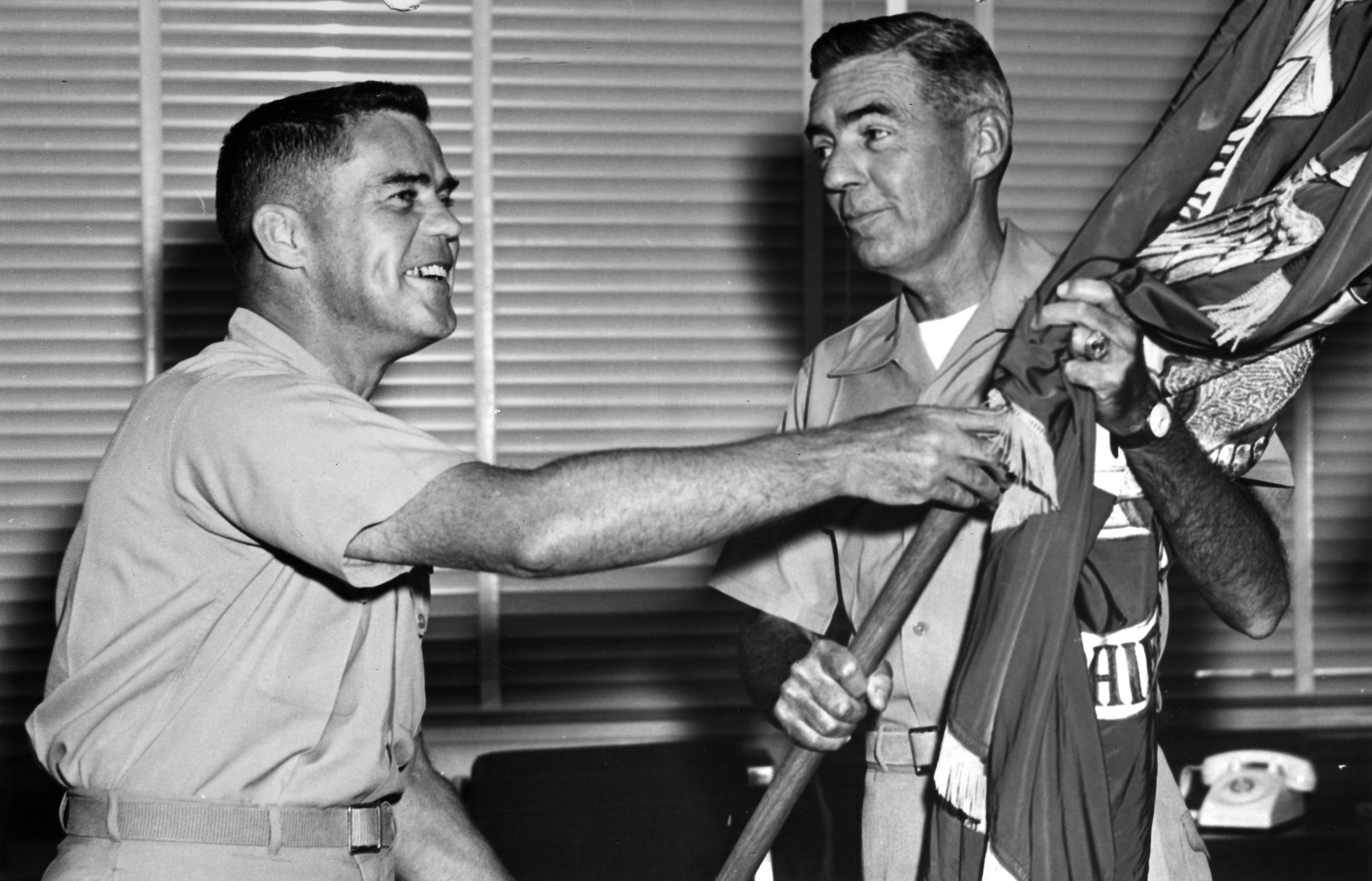
Chip (left) hands over the colors of 9th MAB to BrigGen. John E. Williams during the change of command ceremony on August 12, 1968.

During the first two years of the United States involvement in Vietnam War, Chip was stationed in Naples, Italy, as chief of Plans Branch on the staff of the Commander, Striking and Support Forces, Southern Europe under Vice admiral Frederick Ashworth. He served in that assignment during the progress of Soviet naval build-up in the Mediterranean, when Striking and Support Forces honed its readiness through these years by planning and conducting semi-annual large-scale NATO amphibious exercises as well as numerous small-scale exercises in various disciplines.

Chip was promoted to brigadier general in September 1967 and returned to the United States for duty as deputy assistant chief of staff for operations (G-3 Division) at Headquarters Marine Corps. He remained in that assignment until January 1968, when he was ordered to Okinawa, Japan for duty as commanding general, 9th Amphibious Brigade, the Fleet Marine Force component of the Seventh Fleet, with its headquarters on Okinawa which controlled all Marine forces in the Western Pacific outside of Hawaii and South Vietnam. At this time, the MAB contained nearly 8,000 men, with nearly half assigned to the two Seventh Fleet Special Landing Forces (SLF) Alpha and Bravo.

On August 22, 1968, Chip was transferred to South Vietnam and assumed duty as assistant division commander, 3rd Marine Division under Major General Raymond G. Davis with additional duty as commanding general, Task Force Hotel. Chip led his task force, consisting of two battalions of 1st Marine Regiment and 2nd Battalion, 3rd Marines. His task force was assigned the task of maintaining the defense of Khe Sanh Combat Base and the surrounding outposts on Hills 881, 861, 950, and other prominent terrain features.

His tour in South Vietnam ended prematurely on September 17, 1968, when his UH-1E Huey helicopter hit a tree and crashed 200 meters south of the Vandegrift Combat Base. Beside General Chip, Lieutenant Colonel Frederic S. Knight, commanding officer, 2nd Battalion, 9th Marines was on board. Both men survived the crash, but Chip suffered a spine fracture. He was evacuated to the Bethesda Naval Hospital, Maryland, and succeeded by Brigadier General Frank E. Garretson in command of Task Force Hotel. For his service in Southeast Asia, Chip was decorated with Legion of Merit with Combat "V" and also received National Order of Vietnam and Gallantry Cross with Palm by the Government of Republic of Vietnam.

Following his full recovery in February 1969, Chip was ordered to the Headquarters Marine Corps and assumed duty as Assistant Quartermaster General of the Marine Corps (Facilities and Service) under Major General Wallace H. Robinson. While in this capacity, he was co-responsible for the support of development, production, acquisition, and sustainment of general supply, Mortuary Affairs, subsistences, petroleum and water, material and distribution management during peace and war to provide combat power to the U.S. Marine Corps units.

Upon promotion of general Robinson to three-star rank and capacity of director of Defense Logistics Agency in July 1971, Chip assumed duty as Quartermaster General of the Marine Corps, becoming 21st Marine general in that capacity. He was promoted to the rank of major general on July 1, 1971. Chip remained in that capacity for another year, when he retired from active duty after 30 years of service. He was decorated with his second Legion of Merit for his service with the Quartermaster's Department.

== Retirement ==
Following his retirement from the Marine Corps, Chip served as director of the Naval Institute for one year. He then resided in Vero Beach, Florida, where he died on June 16, 1992, aged 72. General Chip was buried with full military honors at Arlington National Cemetery, Virginia, beside his wife Jean Waddington Chip. They had three sons: William W., John D. and George M.

== Decorations ==
Here is the ribbon bar of Major General Chip:

1st Row	Legion of Merit with one 5/16" Gold Star and Combat "V"			
2nd Row	Bronze Star Medal with Combat "V"	Navy Commendation Medal with Combat "V"	Navy Unit Commendation	Asiatic-Pacific Campaign Medal with three 3/16 inch service stars
3rd Row	American Campaign Medal	World War II Victory Medal	National Defense Service Medal with one star	Korean Service Medal with three 3/16 inch service stars
4th Row	Vietnam Service Medal with one 3/16 inch service star	United Nations Korea Medal	Philippine Liberation Medal with one star	Philippine Republic Presidential Unit Citation
5th Row	Republic of Korea Presidential Unit Citation	National Order of Vietnam, 5th Class	Vietnam Gallantry Cross with Palm	Vietnam Campaign Medal

== See also ==
- 3rd Marine Division

Military offices
Preceded by Wallace H. Robinson	Quartermaster General of the Marine Corps; August 1971 - July 1972	Succeeded by Harry C. Olson
