= Camp Horn =

Former US Marine Corps and US Army base in Vietnam

Camp Horn
- Da Nang, Hải Châu in Vietnam
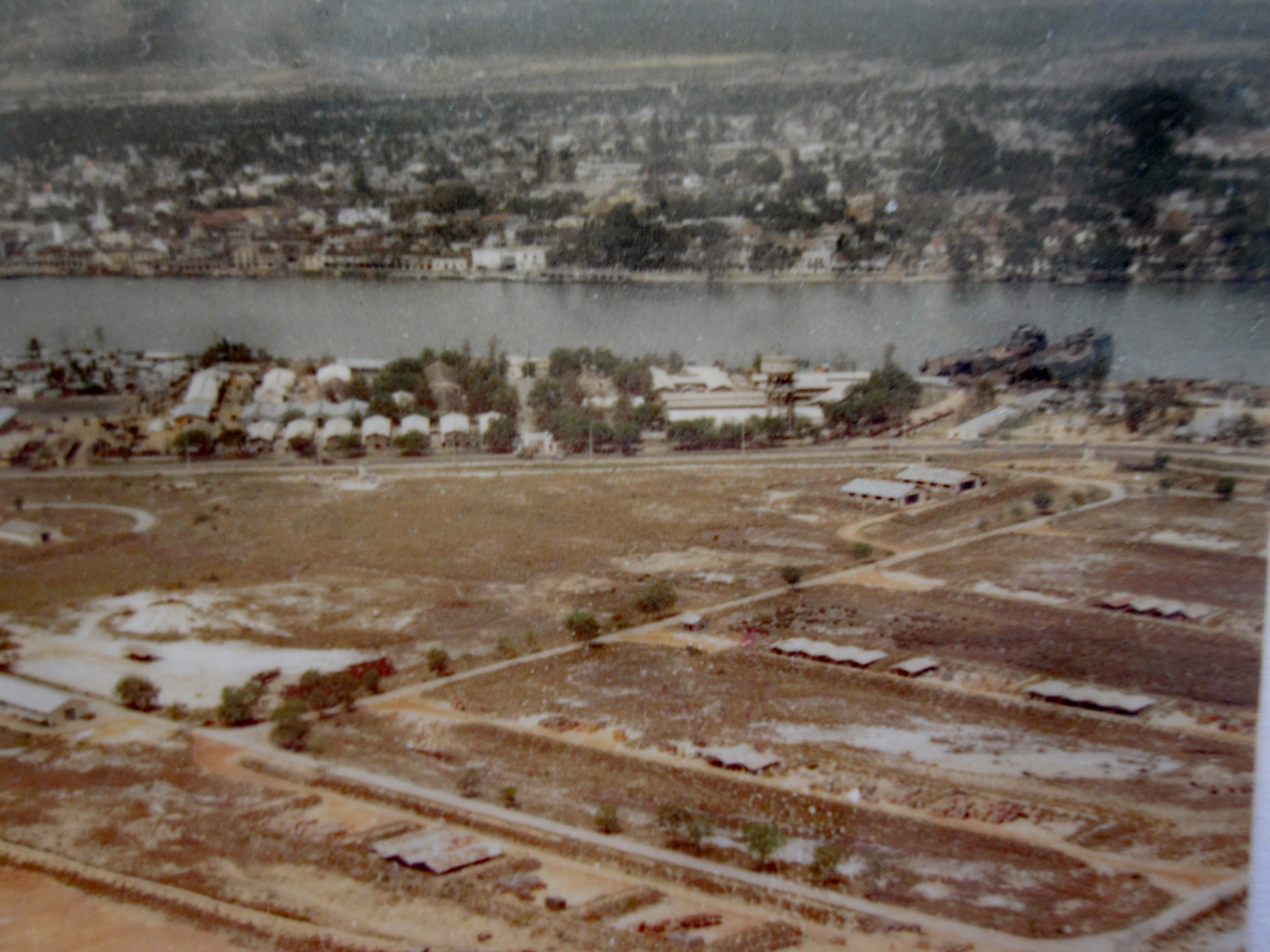
- III MAF Headquarters

Site information
- Type: Marine Corps/Army Base
- Operator: Army of the Republic of Vietnam (ARVN); United States Marine Corps; United States Army (U.S. Army)

Location
- Shown within Vietnam
- Coordinates: 16.074°N 108.236°E

Site history
- Built: 1966
- In use: 1966-
- Battles/wars: Vietnam War

Garrison information
- Garrison: III Marine Amphibious Force; XXIV Corps

Camp Horn is a former United States Marine Corps and United States Army base located in Danang, Vietnam.

== History ==
Following the initial landing of Marines in South Vietnam on 8 March 1965, the 9th Marine Expeditionary Brigade (9th MEB) established their headquarters in an old French Army compound on the western edge of Da Nang Air Base. The III Marine Amphibious Force (III MAF) succeeded the 9th MEB and took over the compound.

On 26 June 1966 III MAF headquarters was moved to a compound on the Tiensha Peninsula on the east side of the Hàn River opposite Danang.

The base was named Camp Horn after Colonel Charles Horn, a III MAF engineer who drowned following a Vietcong (VC) attack on the Nam-O bridge on 13 April 1967.

In October 1968 Mobile Construction Battalion 12 built a hardened combat operations center at the base.

In 1968 a Direct Air Support Center was established at the base, responsible for all air support missions throughout I Corps.

The 1st Radio Battalion was located at the base and was responsible for signals interception of VC and People's Army of Vietnam (PAVN) communications until November 1970 when it moved to Camp JJ Books.

On 9 March 1970 III MAF transferred the base to XXIV Corps which assumed operational control of US forces in I Corps and III MAF moved to Camp Haskins before departing South Vietnam in April 1971.

The US Army's 615th MP Company was based at Camp Horn from 11 November 1972 until their inactivation there on 28 March 1973.

== Current use ==
The base appears to remain in use by the PAVN.
