= Operation Deckhouse IV =

Part of the Vietnam War (1966)

- Part of the Vietnam War
| Date | 15–18 September 1966 |
| Location | eastern Demilitarized Zone, Quảng Trị Province South Vietnam |

Belligerents
| United States | North Vietnam |

Commanders and leaders
| LG Lewis W. Walt; BG Michael P. Ryan; Lt.Col. Anthony Monti | |

Units involved
| Special Landing Force of 1st Battalion, 26th Marines | 324th Division |

Casualties and losses
| 36 killed | 200+ killed |

Operation Deckhouse IV was an operation conducted by the Special Landing Force (SLF) Battalion Landing Team (BLT) of 1st Battalion, 26th Marines in the eastern Demilitarized Zone (DMZ), lasting from 15 to 18 September 1966.

== Prelude ==
U.S. intelligence indicated that a PAVN was moving into the area between Con Thien and the DMZ and the 1st Battalion, 4th Marines conducted a reconnaissance in force of the area from 7 to 13 September making intermittent contact with PAVN units identified as coming from the 90th Regiment of the PAVN 324th Division. Lieutenant General Lewis W. Walt planned Operation Deckhouse IV as just a larger reconnaissance in force of the same area using the SLF floating reserve, 9th Marine Amphibious Brigade under Brigadier General Michael P. Ryan.

One company of BLT 1/26 Marines would be landed by amphibious assault craft north of the Cửa Việt River and 2 km south of the DMZ and then sweep 6 miles (9.7 km) west to meet up with the rest of the battalion which would be landed by HMM-363 helicopters west of Highway 1.

== Operation ==
At 07:00 on 15 September 11 LVT-5s from USS Vancouver landed and secured the beachhead without resistance, simultaneously HMM-363 helicopters operating from USS Iwo Jima landed the heliborne forces unopposed.

At 13:30 a platoon from the 3rd Reconnaissance Battalion engaged a PAVN force 5 miles (8.0 km) northeast of Đông Hà. The outnumbered Marines called for helicopter extraction, but this was aborted after five helicopters were hit by ground fire. Artillery and air support was called in following which the helicopters were able to extract the Marines. Marine losses were one killed and one missing while PAVN losses were nine killed and a further 30 estimated killed. Following this engagement Company A was ordered to move to the area and arrived by the evening of 16 September and established a night defensive position. At 03:30 on 17 September the PAVN assaulted the position but this was repulsed by the Marines with the support of artillery and naval gunfire. A search of the perimeter found 12 PAVN dead and a wounded PAVN soldier was captured who revealed that the 3rd Recon Marine missing on 15 September had been killed and his burial site was located later that day.

In the northwestern area, on 16 September Company D was hit by heavy mortar fire while patrolling 1 mile (1.6 km) from the DMZ, the Marines called for naval gunfire support and later found three destroyed mortars and 14 dead PAVN. Further south Company B was ambushed by the PAVN losing two dead in a 75-minute engagement.

The Marines found that the PAVN had constructed numerous bunkers and fighting positions in the Con Thien-Gio Linh area.

== Aftermath ==
Operation Deckhouse IV officially concluded on 18 September, however the BLT 1/26 Marines remained ashore until 24 September under the operational control of the 4th Marine Regiment before returning to their ships. PAVN losses in the operation were 200+ killed, U.S. losses were 36 killed.
