= Michael P. Ryan (USMC) =

U.S. Marine Corps Major General

Michael Patrick Ryan
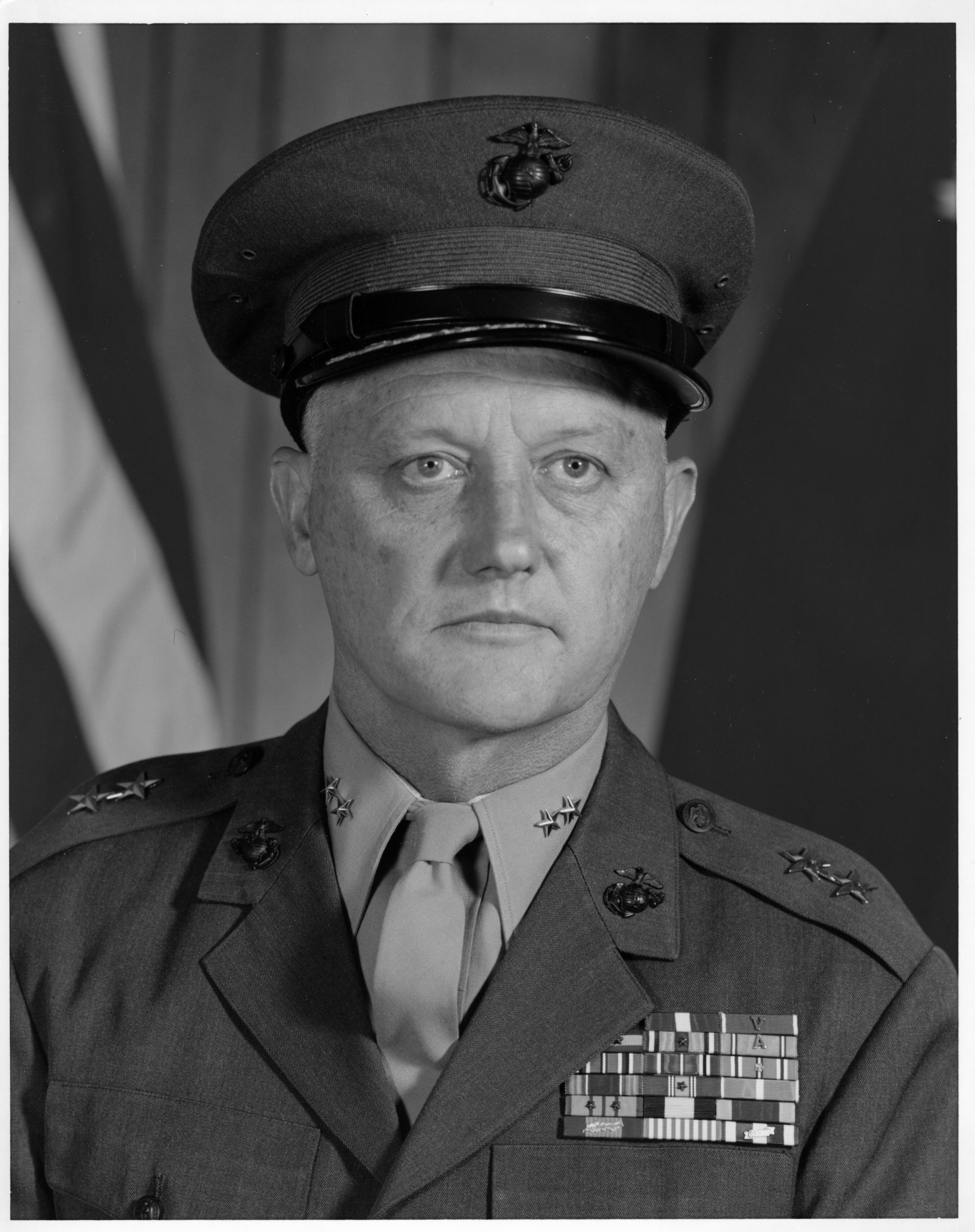
- MajGen Michael P. Ryan, USMC
- Born: January 31, 1916; Osage City, Kansas, US
- Died: January 9, 2005 (aged 88); Northridge, California, US
- Burial place: Arlington National Cemetery
- Military career
- Allegiance: United States of America
- Branch: United States Marine Corps
- Service years: 1933–1977
- Rank: Major general
- Nickname: "Mike"
- Service number: 0-6934
- Commands: Marine Corps Reserve; DepCom FMF, Atlantic; III Marine Amphibious Force; 2nd Marine Division; 9th Marine Amphibious Brigade
- Conflicts: World War II: Occupation of Iceland; Battle of Guadalcanal; Battle of Tarawa; Battle of Saipan; Battle of Tinian; Korean War; Vietnam War: Operation Prairie
- Awards: Navy Cross; Legion of Merit; Distinguished Service Cross (UK)

Michael Patrick Ryan (January 30, 1916 – January 9, 2005) was a highly decorated officer of the United States Marine Corps with the rank of major general. He is most noted for his service as a company commander during Battle of Tarawa, where he earned the Navy Cross, the United States military's second-highest decoration awarded for valor in combat. Ryan later served in Korean and Vietnam Wars and ended his career as director of Marine Corps Reserve. Together with Colonel James L. Fowler, he co-founded the Marine Corps Marathon.

== Early career and World War II ==
Michael P. Ryan was born on January 31, 1916, in Osage City, Kansas, the son of John W. Ryan. Following attending Ward High School in Kansas City, Kansas, he enrolled at Rockhurst College, Missouri, where he studied business administration.

Ryan enlisted in the Marine Corps Reserve in 1933 and served with the 15th Reserve Battalion in Galveston, Texas, until 1940. During his reserve service, Ryan received two awards of Reserve Good Conduct Medal.

He was later called to extended active duty in November 1940 and commissioned a second lieutenant in the Marine Corps. Ryan was subsequently sent to San Diego, California, and appointed rifle platoon leader in the 2nd Battalion, 8th Marines, before he was transferred to the 6th Marine Regiment. He sailed with the 6th Marines, under the command of Colonel Leo D. Hermle, to Iceland, where he remained with occupation forces until his unit was attached to the 2nd Marine Division and sailed for Pacific theater.

Ryan was transferred to the 2nd Marine Regiment, under Colonel John M. Arthur, and participated in the Guadalcanal campaign with that unit. Ryan later reached the rank of major and was appointed commander of Reserve "L" Company within 3rd Battalion.

During the Battle of Tarawa, Major Ryan landed on Betio Island under heavy enemy fire on November 20, 1943. After his company was almost wiped out, he had rallied the survivors of his unit, two M4 Sherman tanks and other Marines from infantry and machine gun platoons scattered on the beach, from which he formed a composite battalion and attacked. Ryan, who had been thought to be killed in action, arranged for naval gunfire and mounted an attack that cleared the island's western end. Thanks to his actions, the first substantial reinforcements landed intact after two days of heavy fighting.

For his gallantry in action, Major Ryan was decorated with the Navy Cross, the second highest decoration for valor, and the British Distinguished Service Cross.

Ryan was later appointed executive officer of the 2nd Battalion, 2nd Marines, and served in this capacity during the Battles of Saipan and Tinian in summer 1944. He was ordered back to the United States in November 1944 and assigned to training center at Camp Pendleton, California as commanding officer of the 3rd Training Battalion. Ryan remained in that capacity until June 1945.

=== Navy Cross citation ===
Citation:

The President of the United States of America takes pleasure in presenting the Navy Cross to Major Michael Patrick Ryan (MCSN: 0-6934), United States Marine Corps Reserve, for extraordinary heroism and distinguished service while serving as Commanding Officer of Company L, Third Battalion, Second Marines, SECOND Marine Division, and also as Commanding Officer of a Composite Battalion, in action against enemy Japanese forces at Betio Island, Tarawa Atoll, Gilbert Islands, from 20 to 24 November 1943. Landing with his company in the fourth wave, Major Ryan courageously led a fierce, determined assault against the enemy and, retaining the initiative despite heavy casualties sustained by his forces, organized two other rifle companies with his own into a composite battalion which, under his skillful direction, successfully held a shallow beachhead throughout the remainder of the day and night. On the following morning, he led his composite unit in an aggressive attack toward the strongly-defended south beach of Betio Island, continually exposing himself to intense hostile fire and inspiring his men by his own personal valor until an important beachhead was cleared of the Japanese and reinforcements and supplies could be landed for our forces without resistance. Major Ryan's brilliant tactical ability and indomitable fighting spirit in the face of grave peril contributed in large measure to the ultimate capture of a highly strategic atoll and reflect great credit upon himself, his gallant command and the United States Naval Service.

== Later career ==
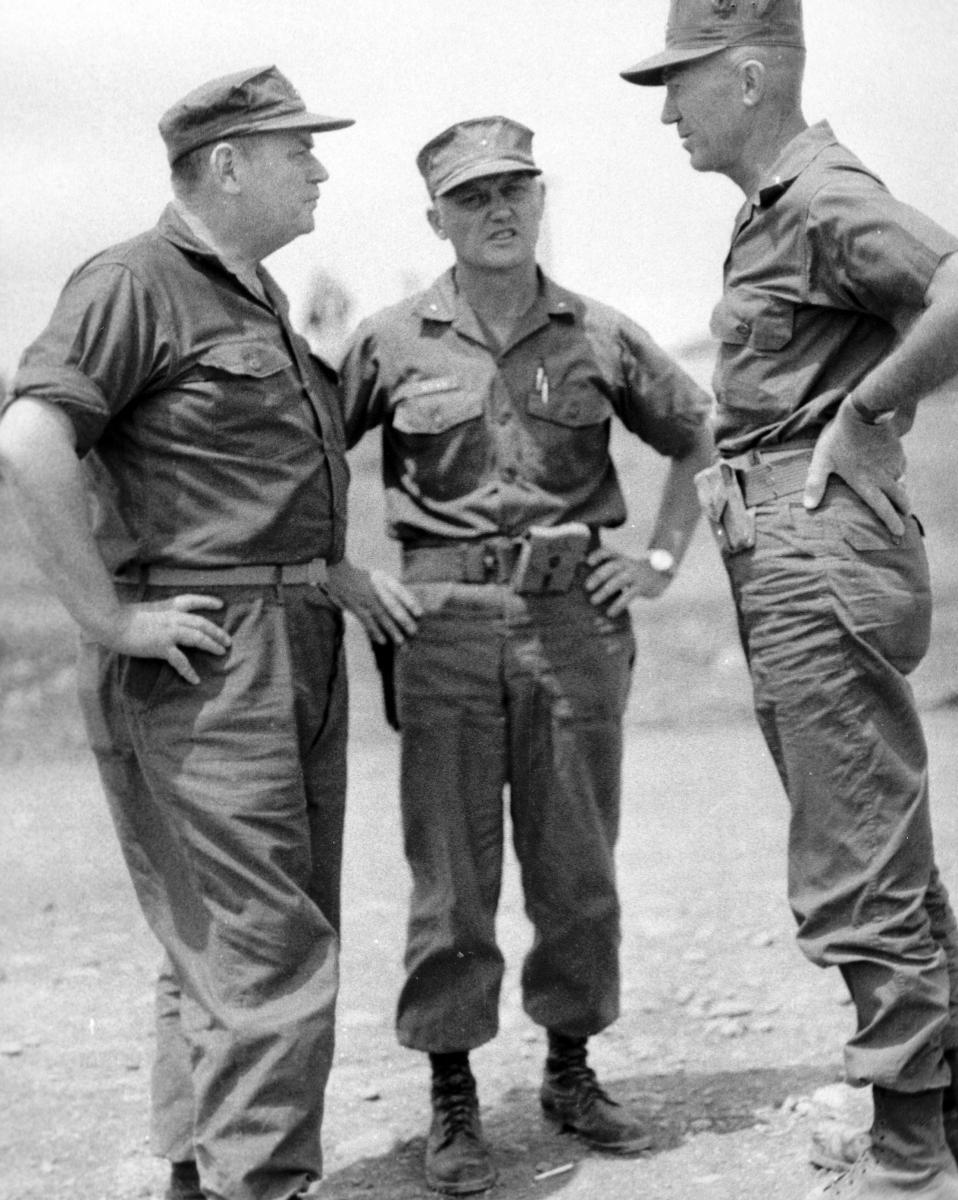
Lt. Gen. Henry W. Buse Jr., Chief of Staff, HQMC; Brig. Gen. Ryan, Assistant 3rd Division Commander; and Maj. Gen. Bruno A. Hochmuth, commander of the 3rd Marine Division, discuss matters of the coming events for Camp Carroll, 1967.

Following the end of the war, Ryan decided to remain in the Marine Corps. He was subsequently sent to the Marine Corps Schools Quantico, Virginia, where he attended the Junior Course of the Amphibious Warfare School and following graduation, he was appointed an Infantry Instructor there. Ryan was subsequently transferred to Washington, D.C., and attached to the Division of Plans & Policies at Headquarters Marine Corps in September 1948. While in that capacity, he was promoted to the rank of lieutenant colonel in April 1950.

During 1951, he was transferred to Venezuela, where he served within U.S. Naval Mission as technical advisor for Venezuelan Marine Corps until June 1953, when he was ordered back to the United States. Upon his return, Ryan attended the Command and General Staff College at Fort Leavenworth, Kansas. In July 1954, Ryan was ordered to Korea and assumed command of the 1st Battalion, 7th Marines, which participated in the defense of the Korean Demilitarized Zone as part of the 1st Marine Division, under Major General Robert E. Hogaboom.

Lieutenant Colonel Ryan was ordered stateside in June 1955 and after a brief stint with Headquarters Marine Corps in Washington, D.C., he was sent to Hawaii to be appointed training officer with Fleet Marine Force, Pacific and later served as assistant operations officer with Headquarters and Service Battalion at Camp H. M. Smith. He was ordered back to Headquarters Marine Corps in 1957 and attached to the Plans & Policies Section, Personnel Division, as assistant chief. Ryan was promoted to the rank of colonel on August 1, 1958, and after another two years of duties there, he was transferred to Marine Corps Recruit Depot Parris Island, South Carolina, on June 21, 1960. where he served as commanding officer of the Recruit Training Regiment under Brigadier General George R. E. Shell.

In June 1963, Ryan was assigned to the Senior Course at the National War College. Following his graduation in July 1964, he was ordered back to Headquarters Marine Corps and appointed assistant director of Joint Planning Group within the Office of Deputy Chief of Staff for Plans and Programs. While in this capacity, he was promoted to the rank of brigadier general in January 1966 and subsequently assumed duties as assistant chief of staff (G-2) for plans and operations. Ryan also graduated from George Washington University with a Bachelor of Arts degree in the same year.

Ryan was transferred to Camp Courtney, Japan during the April 1966 and succeeded Brigadier General William A. Stiles as commanding general of the 9th Marine Amphibious Brigade. He supervised the formation of the staff and subsequent training of the newly activated unit for the Vietnam War. He was then transferred to Camp Carroll, Vietnam, at the beginning of January 1967, where he assumed the duties of Assistant Division Commander of the 3rd Marine Division under Major General Bruno Hochmuth. Ryan arrived just for the end of the Operation Prairie and participated in the fighting in the Vietnamese Demilitarized Zone. He left Vietnam at the beginning of Operation Hickory in May 1967 and returned to the United States. For his service in this capacity, Ryan was decorated with the Legion of Merit with Combat "V" and also received another Navy Presidential Unit Citation.

He was subsequently assigned to the Marine Corps Base Quantico, Virginia, under the command of Major General James M. Masters and appointed director of the Command and Staff College there. Ryan proved his qualities as training officer and subsequently was appointed deputy for education and director of Quantico Education Center in June 1968. While in this capacity, he was promoted to the rank of major general on September 1, 1968.

General Ryan remained in Quantico until May 1969, when he was transferred to Camp Lejeune, North Carolina, in order to assume command of the 2nd Marine Division. His new command participated only in field exercises in the United States. He was succeeded by Major General Robert D. Bohn at the beginning of June 1971 and traveled to Norfolk, Virginia, to be appointed deputy commander of Fleet Marine Force Atlantic, under Lieutenant General George C. Axtell.

He returned once more to Japan and was appointed commanding general of III Marine Amphibious Force on Okinawa during January 1973, but returned stateside after one year. Ryan concluded his career as director of Marine Corps Reserve at Headquarters Marine Corps in Washington, D.C.

On October 17, 1975, his subordinate Colonel James L. Fowler wrote a memo to Ryan, outlining the idea of creating a Marine Corps Reserve Marathon to promote goodwill between the military and the post-Vietnam community. General Ryan embraced the idea and submitted it to then-Marine Corps Commandant General Louis H. Wilson Jr. for approval. With General Wilson's blessing, the planning process for the first Marine Corps Marathon began and the inaugural run took place on November 7, 1976.

Major General Ryan retired from the Marine Corps on July 1, 1977, after 44 years of service. Upon his retirement, he settled in Texas, but later moved to California, where he died on January 9, 2005, in Northridge. Ryan is buried at Arlington National Cemetery together with his wife, Marjorie Eleanor Allen Ryan (1920–1998). They had three children: Michael Patrick Ryan Jr. of Mexico City, Allen Frederic Ryan of Solana Beach, California, and Theresa Cecile Ryan of Northridge.

== Decorations ==
Below is the ribbon bar of Major General Michael P. Ryan:

1st Row	Navy Cross		Legion of Merit with Combat "V"	
2nd Row	Navy Presidential Unit Citation with two stars	Reserve Good Conduct Medal with one star	American Defense Service Medal with "A" Device	American Campaign Medal
3rd Row	European–African–Middle Eastern Campaign Medal	Asiatic-Pacific Campaign Medal with one 3/16 inch silver service star	World War II Victory Medal	National Defense Service Medal with one star
4th Row	Korean Service Medal	Vietnam Service Medal with two 3/16 inch service stars	British Distinguished Service Cross	National Order of Vietnam, Grade Knight
5th Row	Vietnam Gallantry Cross with Palm	United Nations Korea Medal	Vietnam Gallantry Cross Unit Citation	Vietnam Campaign Medal

Military offices
Preceded by Louis Metzger	Commanding General of the III Marine Amphibious Force; January 1, 1973 – December 30, 1973	Succeeded by Herman Poggemeyer Jr.
Preceded by Edwin B. Wheeler	Commanding General of the 2nd Marine Division; May 19, 1969 – June 4, 1971	Succeeded by Robert D. Bohn
Preceded by William A. Stiles	Commanding General of the 9th Marine Amphibious Brigade; April 15, 1966 – January 4, 1967	Succeeded by Louis Metzger
