= Frederick J. Karch =

United States Marine Corps general (1917–2009)

Frederick Joseph Karch
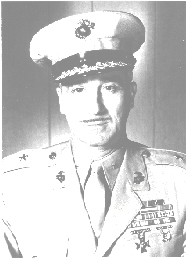
- Born: August 9, 1917; Carmi, Illinois, U.S.
- Died: May 23, 2009 (aged 91); Arlington County, Virginia, U.S.
- Burial place: Arlington National Cemetery
- Military career
- Allegiance: United States of America
- Branch: United States Marine Corps
- Service years: 1940–1967
- Rank: Brigadier general
- Conflicts: World War II; Vietnam War
- Awards: Legion of Merit; Bronze Star; Army Commendation Medal; American Defense Service Medal; American Campaign Medal; National Defense Service Medal

Frederick Joseph Karch (August 9, 1917 – May 23, 2009) was a United States Marine Corps officer who served during World War II and the Vietnam War, particularly notable in the latter for leading the Marine Corps onto Nam O Beach at the beginning of large-scale US involvement in Vietnam.

== Biography ==
=== Early life ===
Karch was born in Carmi, Illinois, the son of Carmi Township High School principal Henry J. Karch and his wife Flora Clark Karch. In 1935 he graduated from Carmi Township High School and went on to study at the University of Illinois.

=== Enlistment and World War II ===
After one year at the University of Illinois, where he was a member of Sigma Alpha Epsilon fraternity, Karch transferred to the United States Naval Academy in Annapolis, Maryland. Upon graduation in June 1940, he was commissioned as a United States Marine Corps second lieutenant. At Philadelphia Navy Yard, Karch completed Basic Training and was sent to San Diego as a battery officer in the 10th Marine Regiment.

In 1941, while Karch was stationed in Iceland, America was brought into World War II by the Japanese attack on Pearl Harbor. During the war, Karch rose through the ranks to lieutenant colonel in a series of promotions in March 1942, May 1942, May 1943 and May 1945.

In July 1942, Karch joined the 12th Marines, 3rd Marine Division as a battalion executive officer. From February until September 1943 he served as commanding officer, 1st Battalion, 14th Marines, and served for the remainder of the war as operations officer of the 14th Marines. Karch was awarded the Legion of Merit and the Bronze Star during the Roi-Namur, Saipan, Tinian, and Iwo Jima campaigns.

=== Inter-war period ===
From January 1946 until July 1947, the now Lieutenant Colonel Karch was the chairman of the Board of Review, Discharges and Dismissals in the Navy Department in Washington, D.C. He then became an artillery instructor at Quantico's Marine Corps Schools until September 1949, where he became a member of the directing staff at the Canadian Army Staff College.

Transferred to the 10th Marines, 2nd Marine Division in December 1951, having left the directing staff in November, he commanded the 4th Battalion. In June 1952, he became regimental executive officer, and from June until December 1953, he served as personnel assistant to the division, whereupon he was sent to the Joint Landing Force Board at Camp Lejeune, North Carolina.

In March 1955, he was sent to Tokyo under the Far East Command as the chief of Intelligence Plans Section, where he was promoted to colonel and awarded the Army Commendation Medal.

Karch then completed the Senior Course at the Quantico Marine Corps Schools in June 1958, whereupon he was assigned to the 2nd Marine Division as regimental commander of the 10th Marines as well as the assistant chief of staff until July 1961.

Karch graduated from the Army War College in June of the following year and was assigned to Headquarters Marine Corps as executive officer and assistant deputy chief of staff. In 1963, he received a master's degree from George Washington University, and in 1964 he was promoted to brigadier general.

=== Vietnam ===
Karch was then sent to Okinawa in November 1964 as assistant division commander to the 3rd Division. In February of the following year, he was sent to South Vietnam as commanding general of the 9th Marine Expeditionary Brigade, where he directed the Marine landing on Nam O Beach, a very public display of American intentions in Vietnam which was the idea of President Lyndon Johnson. For his efforts, he was awarded a second Legion of Merit.

The landing took place on 8 March 1965 on the coastline around the port of Da Nang in South Vietnam. In the few days preceding the landing, Karch commented that the weather was the worst that he had experienced. When inhabitants of the friendly beach greeted the arriving Marines and photographs were taken, Karch was never seen to smile. When this was queried, he replied "... if I had to do it over, that picture would have been the same. When you have a son in Vietnam and he gets killed, you don't want a smiling general with flowers around his neck as leader at that point."

December 1965 saw Karch report back to the Marine Corps Schools, Quantico, as director, Command and Staff College until June 1967, when he retired from active duty. For his final role at Quantico, he was awarded his third Legion of Merit.

Karch died on May 23, 2009, aged 91, in Arlington County, Virginia, due to heart failure.

== Awards and decorations ==
Among Karch's military decorations are the following:

Legion of Merit w/ 2 award stars & valor device		Bronze Star w/ valor device	Army Commendation Medal
Navy Presidential Unit Citation	Navy Unit Commendation	American Defense Service Medal	American Campaign Medal
European-African-Middle Eastern Campaign Medal	Asiatic-Pacific Campaign Medal w/ 4 service stars	World War II Victory Medal	National Defense Service Medal w/ 1 service star
Armed Forces Expeditionary Medal	Vietnam Service Medal	Vietnam Gallantry Cross unit citation	Vietnam Campaign Medal
