= Operation Deckhouse Five =

Part of the Vietnam War (1967)

Operation Deckhouse V
- Part of the Vietnam War
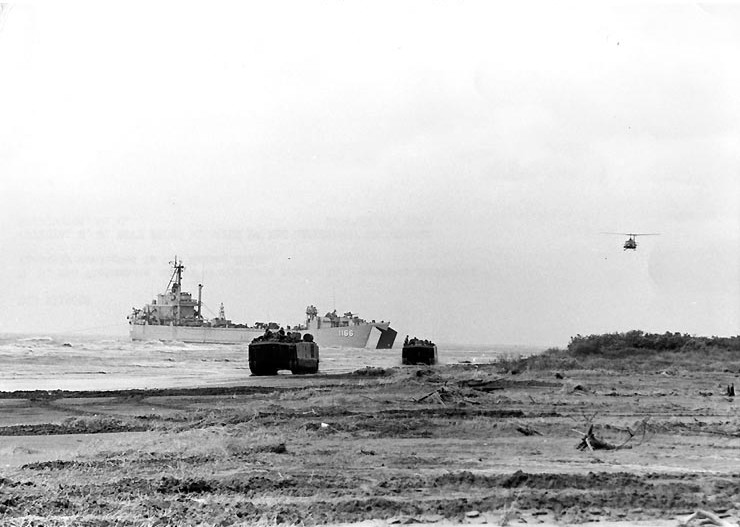
- Two USMC amtracs move along a beach, with a UH-1 helicopter approaching at right. USS Washtenaw County is in the background
| Date | 6–15 January 1967; 59 years ago |
| Location | Kiến Hòa Province, South Vietnam |
| Result | Inconclusive |

Belligerents
| United States; South Vietnam | Viet Cong |

Commanders and leaders
| (United States) BG Louis Metzger | |

Units involved
| 1st Battalion 9th Marines (South Vietnam) 3rd and 4th Marine Battalions | Unknown |

Casualties and losses
| (United States) 7 killed (South Vietnam) 1 killed | 21 killed 44 weapons recovered |

Operation Deckhouse Five was a United States Marine Corps (USMC) and Republic of Vietnam Marine Corps operation that took place from 6–15 January 1967 in the Mekong Delta, during the Vietnam War. "The ten-day sweep," reported the AP from its daily military roundup from Saigon, "proved unproductive."

== Background ==
For the USMC, the operation was notable for the following reasons: it was a sizable, combined USMC and Vietnamese Marine amphibious operation and it was the last Special Landing Force (SLF) amphibious landing to take place beyond the boundaries of I Corps. An SLF was the designation of the Marine battalion (1st Battalion, 9th Marine Regiment reinforced) and the medium helicopter squadron (HMM) assigned to the Seventh Fleet Amphibious Ready Group. The SLF regularly conducted amphibious operations across Vietnamese beaches into areas of suspected Viet Cong and People's Army of Vietnam (PAVN) activity. The intent of the operation was to secure ammunition dumps, ordnance and engineering workshops, hospitals, and indoctrination centers.

== Operation ==
After 2 days of postponement due to bad weather, the operation began on 6 January with a sea and heliborne assault onto the beaches between the Co Chien and Ham Luong branches of the Mekong Delta which was suspected of being a Viet Cong stronghold.

=== Supporting units ===
- HMM-362
- VMO-3
- USS Iwo Jima (LPH-2)
- USS Canberra (CA-70)

== Aftermath ==
The operation was a ‘disappointment’ resulting in ‘only’ 21 Vietcong killed, 2 small arms workshops destroyed and 44 weapons captured for the loss of 7 US and 1 Vietnamese Marines. It was believed that the Vietcong had been forewarned of the attack because intelligence learned that larger Vietcong units had recently left the area.
