= Operation Beaver Cage =

Part of the Vietnam War (1967)

- Part of the Vietnam War
Date	April 28 – May 12, 1967
Location	Que Son Valley, Quang Nam Province, South Vietnam
Result	U.S. victory

Belligerents
United States	Viet Cong

Commanders and leaders
COL James A Gallo Jr.	

Units involved
1st Battalion, 3rd Marines	

Casualties and losses
55 killed	181 killed 66 captured

Operation Beaver Cage was a U.S. Marine Corps operation in the Que Son Valley that took place from 28 April through to 12 May 1967.

== Background ==
Operation Beaver Cage was an operation by Special Landing Force Alpha comprising 1st Battalion, 3rd Marines and HMM-263 against the Viet Cong (VC) base areas in the Que Son Valley south of Danang.

== Operation ==
The operation commenced with a helicopter assault into the valley at 07:00 on 28 April. Contact was minimal until the night of 2 May when a VC unit attacked Company C's night defensive position and was forced back by artillery and AC-47 Spooky gunfire.

On 5 May as the Battalion headquarters was being withdrawn by helicopters it was attacked by VC mortar and small arms fire, the assault was repulsed without loss.

On 9 May Beaver Cage was joined with Operation Union. On 10 May Companies B and C engaged a large VC unit killing 86 VC.

== Aftermath ==
The operation concluded on 12 May, Marine losses were 55 dead and 151 wounded, while VC losses were 181 killed and 66 captured.
