= VMM-363 =

Marine Medium Tiltrotor Squadron 363
- VMM-363 Unit insignia
- Active: 2 June 1952–present
- Country: United States of America
- Branch: United States Marine Corps
- Type: Marine Medium Tiltrotor Squadron
- Role: Assault Support
- Part of: Marine Aircraft Group 24; 1st Marine Aircraft Wing
- Garrison/HQ: MCB Hawaii
- Nickname: Lucky Red Lions
- Tail Code: YZ
- Mascot: Lucky the Lion
- Engagements: Vietnam War; Operation Iraqi Freedom; Operation Enduring Freedom; Operation Inherent Resolve

Commanders
- Current commander: LtCol Nicholas J. Halsmer

Marine Medium Tiltrotor Squadron 363 (VMM-363) is a United States Marine Corps tiltrotor squadron consisting of MV-22B Ospreys. The squadron, known as the "Lucky Red Lions", is based at MCB Hawaii and falls under the command of Marine Aircraft Group 24 (MAG-24) and the 1st Marine Aircraft Wing.

== Mission ==
Provide assault support of combat troops, supplies and equipment during amphibious operations and subsequent operations ashore. Routinely, VMM squadrons provide the foundation for an aviation combat element (ACE) of any level Marine Air-Ground Task Force (MAGTF) mission that may include conventional assault support tasks and special operations.

== History ==
=== Early years ===
Marine Helicopter Transport Squadron 363 (HMR-363) was activated on 2 June 1952, at Marine Corps Air Station Santa Ana, California as part of Marine Aircraft Group 36 (MAG-36). In 1953, the unit flew the Sikorsky HRS-1 and during this period took part in Operation Desert Rock, the first atomic test to use ground troops. Soon thereafter, the squadron became the first West Coast helicopter unit to receive the Sikorsky H-34 helicopter. In December 1964, a disastrous flood struck Northern California, and on Christmas Eve, HMM-363 deployed aboard the USS Bennington and rushed northward to the disaster area.

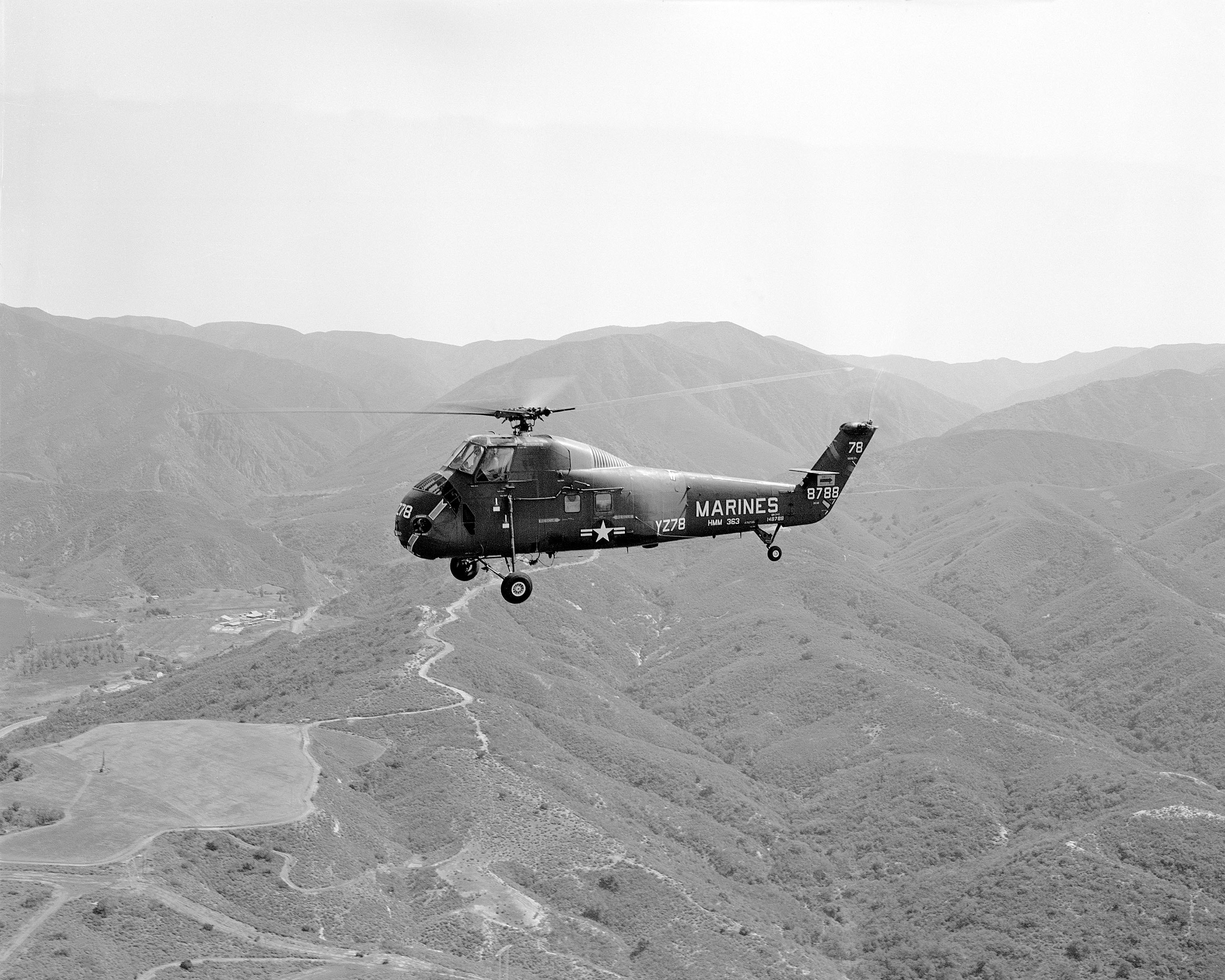
A UH-34D from HMH-363 flying near MCAS Tustin in 1964.

=== Vietnam War ===
On 11 August 1965 the squadron departed the U.S. onboard USS Princeton. The squadron was deployed to Qui Nhon, South Vietnam on 1 September as part of MAG-36. The squadron's initial troop insert was a combined operation with HMM-161 in moving the 3rd Battalion 3rd Marines into a landing zone south of Da Nang at Marble Mountain. Close ties between HMM-363 and Republic of Korea (ROK) forces were developed in Operation Flying Tiger. The Tiger Division was airlifted to Hill 78 in conjunction with the operation, which was viewed as the most successful Korean offensive of the war to date.

At the beginning of 1966 the squadron remained at Qui Nhon under the operational control of the Commanding General, U.S. Field Forces, Vietnam. In early March the squadron supported Operation Utah. On 4 July the squadron became the Special Landing Force (SLF) helicopter squadron aboard USS Iwo Jima. During its time as the SLF squadron it supported Operation Deckhouse II, launched in conjunction with Operation Hastings. In September the squadron supported Operation Deckhouse IV. On 28 September the squadron returned ashore.

On 19 January 1967 the squadron returned to SLF duty on Iwo Jima. In mid-February the squadron supported Operation Deckhouse VI. From 20 March the squadron supported Operation Beacon Hill. On 4 April the squadron was assigned to Marine Aircraft Group 13 at Chu Lai Base Area. In September the squadron supported Operation Swift. In October the squadron supported Operation Kingfisher. By December the squadron was assigned to Marine Aircraft Group 16 at Marble Mountain Air Facility.

On 9 February 1968 the squadron became the SLF Alpha helicopter squadron. On 26 March following a rocket attack, five squadron members were wounded and required medical evacuation. During the flight up the coast the medevac helicopter lost its engine and crashed killing seven people including the commanding officer. On 15 April the squadron returned ashore under the control of MAG-36. On 6 September the squadron again became the SLF Alpha helicopter squadron. On 7 December the squadron returned ashore under MAG-36 at Phu Bai Combat Base.

On 21 January 1969, the squadron was redeployed back to the U.S. It was redesignated Marine Heavy Helicopter Squadron 36 (HMH-363) after having received the Sikorsky CH-53A transport helicopter.

=== Post-Vietnam ===
In October 1972, the squadron was the first unit to receive the powerful CH-53D. In March 1977, the squadron was selected to participate in the operational evaluation of the USS Tarawa, the first of the new large and modern amphibious ships. In early 1983, the squadron was awarded the Meritorious Unit Citation.

The Squadron provided relief efforts and humanitarian support in the Philippines following a devastating earthquake and flood in 1990. HMH-363 flew countless missions and over 500 flight hours in 3½ weeks, delivering food, clothing, and shelter to inhabitants living in remote areas of the Philippines. The squadron received the Humanitarian Service Medal for its relief effort.

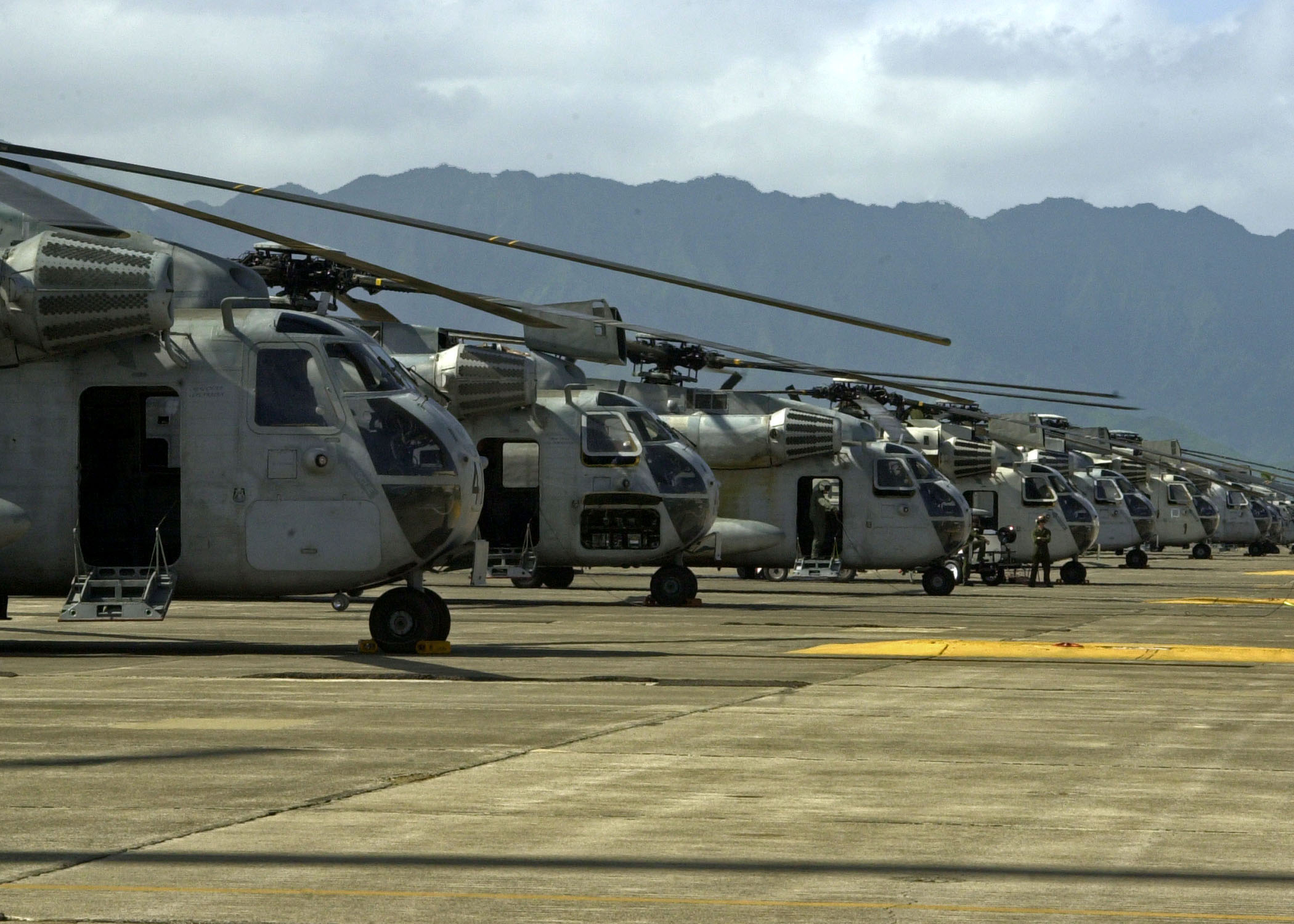
CH-53D Sea Stallions from HMH-363 on the flightline at MCB Hawaii on January 12, 2006.

During Desert Shield/Desert Storm, HMH-363 supported the 1st Marine Aircraft Wing in Okinawa and returned to California in May 1991, terminating its unit rotations to Okinawa after this eleven-month deployment. In December 1992, the squadron participated in Operation Restore Hope in Somalia, and was awarded the Joint Meritorious Unit Commendation and Armed Forces Expeditionary Medal. The squadron has also supported Joint Task Force Six at Fort Bliss, Texas. During August 1996, the Red Lions relocated to Marine Corps Air Facility Kaneohe Bay and were reassigned to 1st Marine Aircraft Wing.

=== Global war on terror ===
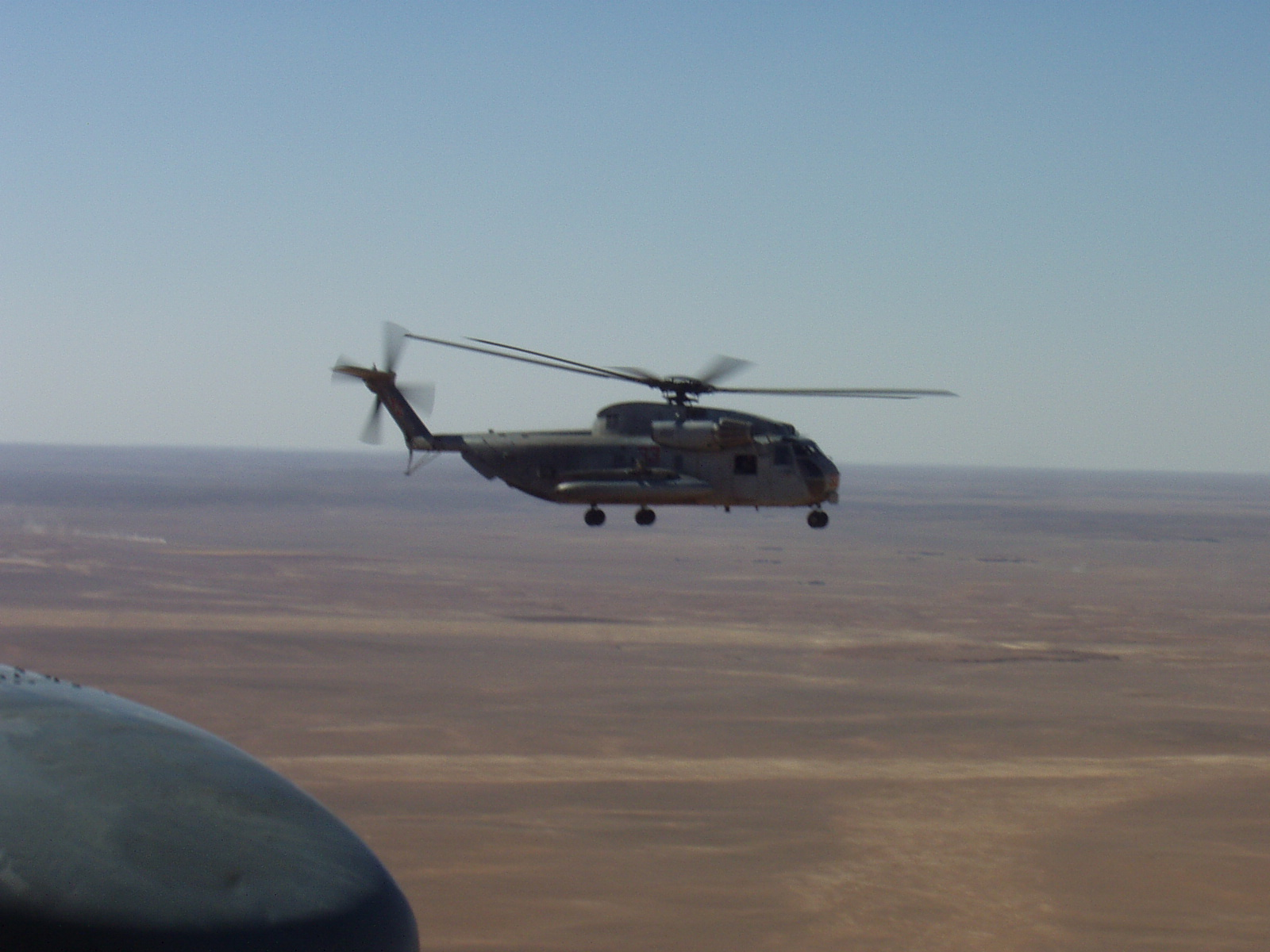
A CH-53D from HMH-363 flying in Iraq.

From late 2006 to early 2007, HMH-363 deployed to Iraq in support of Operation Iraqi Freedom. Based at Al Asad, this was the unit's first deployment in support of the Global War on Terror During Operation Iraqi Freedom HMH-363 flew 848.8 hours in one month. The squadron deployed again to Al Asad in Summer 2008 to support Operation Iraqi Freedom. They returned to MCB Hawaii in February 2009.

HMH-363 was deactivated on 10 May 2012 at Marine Corps Base Kaneohe Bay, Hawaii. The squadron was then re-designated VMM-363 and activated as an MV-22B Osprey Squadron aboard Marine Corps Air Station Miramar as part of Marine Aircraft Group 16, 3rd Marine Aircraft Wing.

Upon activating in 3rd MAW VMM-363 would go on to serve three combat deployments in the Central Command Area of Responsibility before moving back to MCB Hawaii.

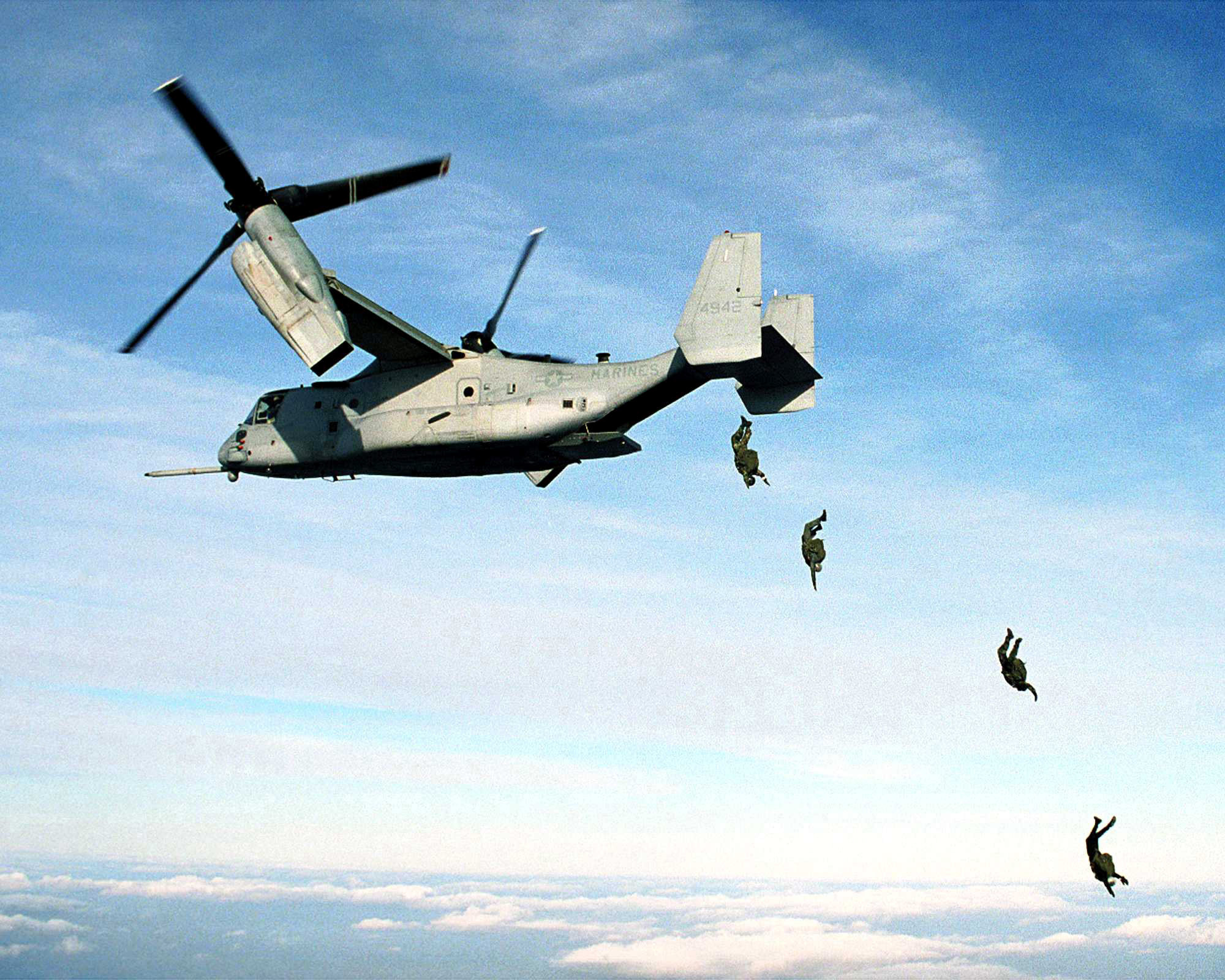
U.S. Marines jump from an Osprey.

== See also ==
- United States Marine Corps Aviation
- List of active United States Marine Corps aircraft squadrons
- List of inactive United States Marine Corps aircraft squadrons
