= Raymond G. Davis =

US Marine Corps Medal of Honor recipient

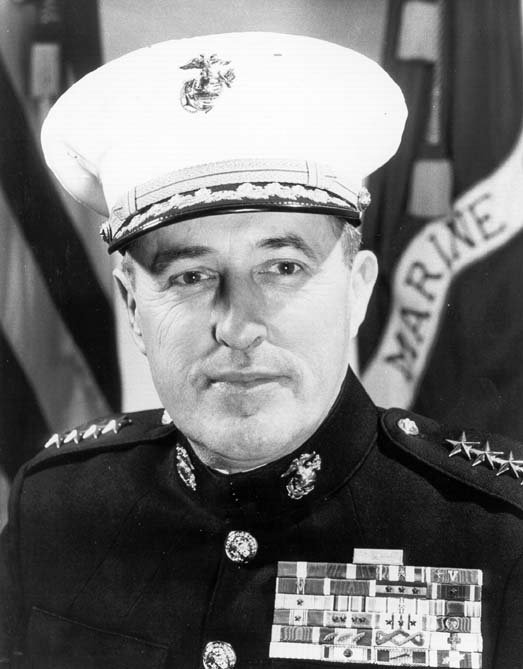
- General Ray Davis, U.S. Marine Corps. Medal of Honor recipient, Asst. Commandant 1971–1972.
- Born: January 13, 1915; Fitzgerald, Georgia, U.S.
- Died: September 3, 2003 (aged 88); Conyers, Georgia, U.S.
- Burial place: Forest Lawn Memorial Gardens College Park, Georgia
- Military career
- Allegiance: United States
- Branch: United States Marine Corps
- Service years: 1938–1972
- Rank: General
- Nickname: Ray
- Commands: 1st Special Weapons Battalion; 1st Battalion, 1st Marines; 1st Battalion, 7th Marines; SEATO Expeditionary Brigade, EXLIGTAS; 3rd Marine Division; Marine Corps Combat Development Command
- Conflicts: World War II; Battle of Guadalcanal; Battle of Cape Gloucester; Battle of Peleliu; Korean War; Battle of Inchon; Battle of Chosin Reservoir; Vietnam War; Operation Dewey Canyon
- Awards: Medal of Honor; Navy Cross; Navy Distinguished Service Medal (2); Silver Star (2); Legion of Merit (2) with Combat "V"; Bronze Star Medal with Combat "V"; Purple Heart Medal; Vietnamese Gallantry Cross (3)

Raymond Gilbert Davis (January 13, 1915 – September 3, 2003) was a United States Marine Corps four-star-general who had served in World War II, the Korean War, and the Vietnam War. Davis was decorated several times, he was awarded the Navy Cross during World War II and the Medal of Honor during the Korean War. While serving as the Assistant Commandant of the Marine Corps, he retired with over 33 years service in the Marine Corps on March 31, 1972.

General Davis had a close association with Marine Corps legend, Chesty Puller, having served with General Puller on Guadalcanal during World War II and in Korea during the Korean War. A middle school was built and named the "General Ray Davis Middle School", in 2006, in Conyers, Georgia, near Stockbridge, where he had resided.

== Early years ==
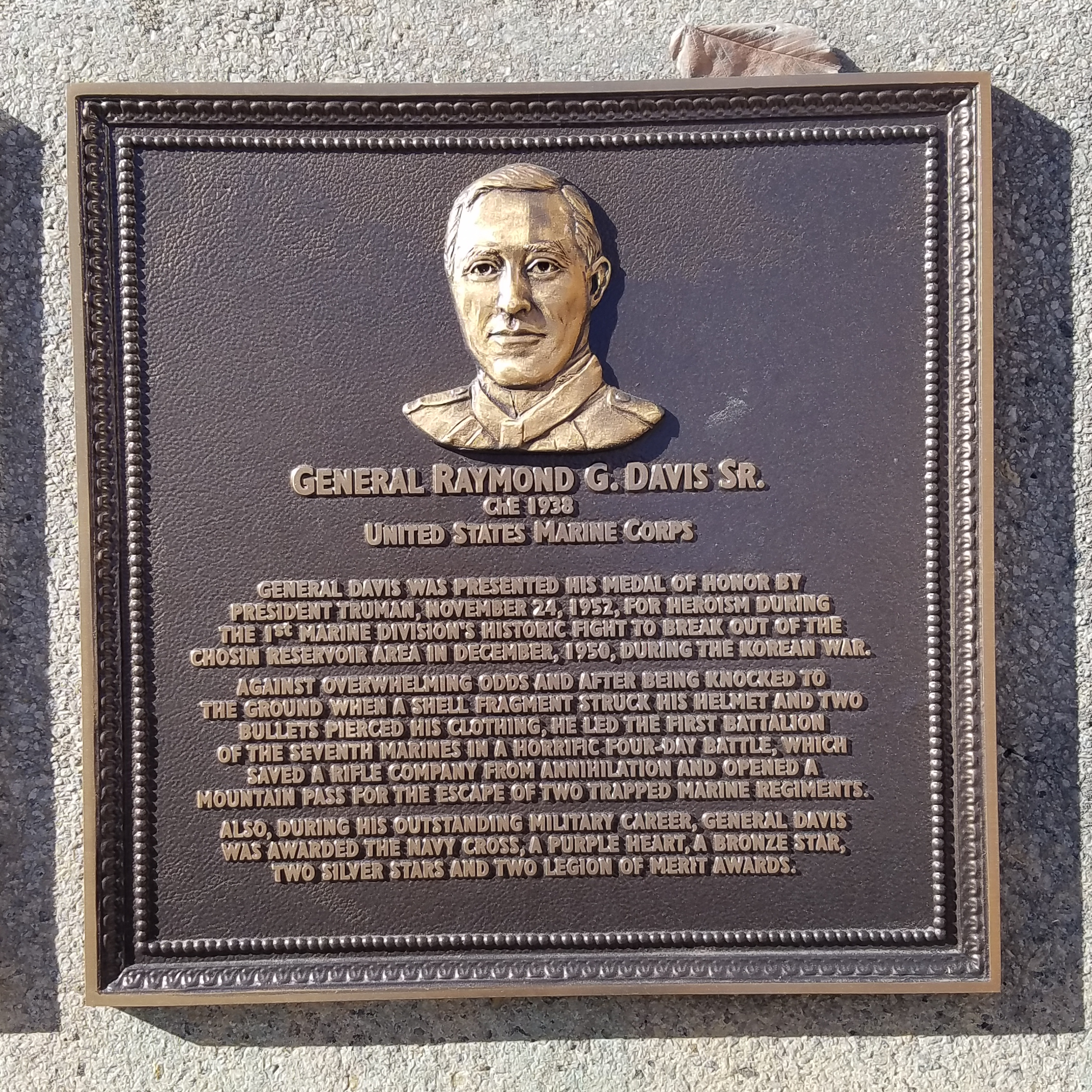
Plaque at Georgia Tech honoring Davis

General Davis was born on January 13, 1915, in Fitzgerald, Georgia, and graduated in 1933 from Atlanta Technical High School, Atlanta, Georgia. He then entered the Georgia Institute of Technology, graduating in 1938 with a Bachelor of Science degree in chemical engineering. While in college he was a member of the ROTC unit. After graduation, he resigned his commission in the U. S. Army Infantry Reserve to accept appointment as a Marine Corps second lieutenant on June 27, 1938.

== Marine Corps career ==
=== 1939–1942 ===
In May 1939, Second Lieutenant Davis completed the Marine Officers' Basic School at the Philadelphia Navy Yard, and began a year of service with the Marine detachment on board the USS Portland in the Pacific. He returned to shore duty in July 1940 for weapons and artillery instruction at Quantico, Virginia, and Aberdeen, Maryland. Completing the training in February 1941, he was assigned to the 1st Antiaircraft Machine Gun Battery, 1st Marine Division at Guantanamo Bay, Cuba. He returned to the United States with the unit in April, and the following month was appointed battery executive officer, serving in that capacity at Parris Island, South Carolina, and Quantico. He was promoted to first lieutenant in August 1941. That September, he moved with the battery to the Marine Barracks, New River (later Camp Lejeune), North Carolina. Upon his promotion to captain in February 1942, he was named battery commander.

=== World War II ===
During World War II, Captain Davis participated in the Guadalcanal-Tulagi landings, the capture and defense of Guadalcanal, the Eastern New Guinea and Cape Gloucester campaigns, and the Peleliu operation.

Beginning in June 1942, he embarked with his unit for the Pacific area, landing at Guadalcanal two months later. After that campaign, he was appointed executive officer of the 1st Special Weapons Battalion, 1st Marine Division. He was promoted to major on February 28, 1943. In October of that year, he took over command of the battalion and served in that capacity at New Guinea and Cape Gloucester. In April 1944, while on Cape Gloucester, he was named commanding officer, 1st Battalion, 1st Marine Regiment, 1st Marine Division.

Davis' heroism while commanding the 1st Battalion, 1st Marines at Peleliu in September 1944 earned him the Navy Cross and the Purple Heart Medal. During the first hour of the Peleliu landing he was wounded. He refused evacuation, and on one occasion, due to heavy Marine casualties and point-blank Japanese cannon fire, the Japanese broke through, he personally rallied and led his men in fighting to re-establish defensive positions. In October 1944, he returned to Pavuvu and was promoted to lieutenant colonel.

=== 1944–1950 ===
Returning to the United States in November 1944, he was assigned to Quantico as Tactical Inspector, Marine Corps Schools. He was named Chief of the Infantry Section, Marine Air-Infantry School, Quantico, in May 1945, and served in that post for two years before returning to the Pacific area in July 1947 to serve with the 1st Provisional Marine Brigade on Guam. He was the 1st Brigade's assistant chief of staff, G-3 (Operations and Training), until August 1948, and from then until May 1949, was assistant chief of staff, G-4 (Logistics). Upon his return from Guam in May 1949, he was named Inspector-Instructor of the 9th Marine Corps Reserve Infantry Battalion in Chicago, Illinois. He served there until August 1950 when he embarked for South Korea.

=== Korean War ===
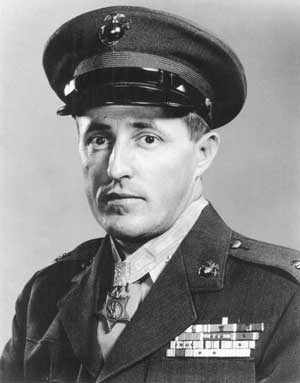
Lieutenant Colonel Davis in 1952

In South Korea, Davis commanded the 1st Battalion 7th Marines, from August to December 1950. During this time one of his men described him as, "...from Georgia and soft spoken. No gruff, no bluff. Never talked down to you and made you feel comfortable in his presence."

During the 1st Marine Division's fight to break out of the Chosin Reservoir area in North Korea during the Battle of the Chosin Reservoir on December 1, 1950, Davis led his battalion in and through fierce firefights with the Chinese People's Volunteer Army from Yudam-ni to Hagru-ri. Davis led in front of his men all the way... marching his battalion at night over mountains in a driving snowstorm, he rescued and saved Fox Company, 2nd Battalion 7th Marines from annihilation at the Toktong Pass. This action also opened the blocked mountain pass to Hagaru-ri allowing two trapped Marine regiments to escape and link up with the rest of the 1st Division at Hagaru-ri. He was recommended for the Medal of Honor. The medal was presented to Davis by President Harry S. Truman in a White House ceremony on November 24, 1952.

Davis was also awarded two Silver Star Medals for gallantry in action, exposing himself to heavy enemy fire while leading and encouraging his men in the face of strong enemy opposition. He received the Legion of Merit with Combat "V" for exceptionally meritorious conduct and professional skill in welding the 1st Battalion, 7th Marines into a highly effective combat team. Later, as executive officer of the 7th Marines, from December 1950 to June 1951, he was awarded the Bronze Star Medal with Combat "V" for his part in rebuilding the 7th Regiment in South Korea after the Chosin Reservoir campaign. He returned to the United States in June 1951 and was assigned to Headquarters Marine Corps in Washington, D.C.

=== 1952–1959 ===
Davis served with Headquarters Marine Corps at the Pentagon until June 1954. He served in the Operations Subsection, G-3, Division of Plans and Policies, until February 1952, when he took charge of the subsection. In April 1953, he became head of the Operations and Training Branch, G-3 Division. While serving in this capacity, he was promoted to full Colonel in October 1953.

The following July, he attended the Special Weapons Employment Course, Fleet Training Center, Norfolk, Virginia, under instruction. In September 1954, he entered the Senior Course, Marine Corps Schools, Quantico. Upon completing the course in June 1955, he served consecutively as assistant director and, later, director, of the Senior School. In October 1957, he was again transferred to Washington, D. C., and served there as Assistant G-2, Headquarters Marine Corps, until August 1959.

=== 1960–1966 ===
In June 1960, Davis completed the course at the National War College in Washington, D.C. Assigned next to Headquarters, United States European Command, in Paris, France, he served from July 1960 through June 1963, as chief, Analysis Branch, J-2, staff of the commander in chief, Europe. On July 1, 1963, he was promoted to Brigadier general while en route to the United States.

Davis' next assignment was in the Far East, where he served as assistant division commander, 3rd Marine Division, Fleet Marine Force, on Okinawa, from October 1963 to November 1964. During this period, he also performed additional duty as commanding general, SEATO Expeditionary Brigade, EXLIGTAS, in the Philippines, during June 1964; and as commanding general, 9th Marine Expeditionary Brigade, in China Sea Contingency Operations, from August 2, to October 16, 1964.

In December 1964, he was assigned to Headquarters Marine Corps. He served as assistant director of personnel until March 1965, then served as assistant chief of staff, G-1, until March 1968. For his service in the latter capacity, he was awarded a second Legion of Merit medal. He was promoted to Major general in November 1966.

=== Vietnam War ===
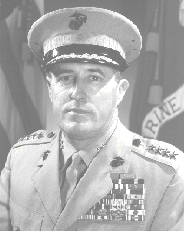
General Davis after his promotion to full general

In March 1968, he was sent to the South Vietnam and served until May 1968 as the Deputy Commanding General of the Provisional Corps. He then became commanding general, 3rd Marine Division until April 1969. When he took command of the division, he ordered Marine units to move out of their combat bases and engage the enemy. He had noted that the manning of the bases and the defensive posture they had developed was contrary to their normally aggressive style of fighting. As part of this change in tactics, he would order Operation Dewey Canyon in early 1969 to engage the People's Army of Vietnam in the A Shau Valley. During this battle, his son Miles Davis, a rifle company platoon commander in K Company, 3rd Battalion, 9th Marines, was wounded in action. For his service as commanding general of the 3rd Marine Division from May 22, 1968, until April 14, 1969, he was awarded the Navy Distinguished Service Medal. The South Vietnam government awarded him several decorations including three Republic of Vietnam Gallantry Crosses.

==== 1969–1972 ====
In May 1969, Davis was assigned duty as deputy for education with additional duty as director, Education Center, Marine Corps Development and Education Command, Quantico, Virginia. After his promotion to Lieutenant general on July 1, 1970, he was reassigned duty as commanding general, Marine Corps Development and Education Command.

On February 23, 1971, President Richard M. Nixon nominated Davis for appointment to the grade of general and assignment to the position of Assistant Commandant of the Marine Corps. His nomination was confirmed by the Senate and he received his fourth star on March 12, 1971. General Davis served as Assistant Commandant of the Marine Corps until he retired from active duty on March 31, 1972.

== Post-Marine Corps career ==
In 2003, General Davis (Ret.) participated in an independent investigative commission headed by retired admiral Thomas H. Moorer. This commission investigated the details of the controversial 1967 USS Liberty incident and determined, among other things, that the state of Israel had deliberately attacked an American ship in international waters, killing 34 U.S. sailors in the process and perpetrating an act of war. Also participating in the commission was Rear Admiral Merlin Staring and former U.S. ambassador to Saudi Arabia James E. Akins. The so-called Moorer Commission submitted their findings to the United States government along with a request for a proper Congressional investigation of the attack. No investigation has been conducted.

== Military awards ==
Davis' decorations and awards include:

Medal of Honor	Navy Cross	Navy Distinguished Service Medal w/ 5/16" Gold Star
Silver Star w/ one 5/16" Gold Star	Legion of Merit w/ Combat "V" and 5/16" Gold Star	Bronze Star w/ Combat "V"
Purple Heart	Combat Action Ribbon w/ one 5/16" Gold Star	Navy and Marine Corps Presidential Unit Citation w/ three 3/16" Bronze Stars
Navy Unit Commendation w/ one 3/16" Bronze Star	American Defense Service Medal w/ Fleet Clasp (3/16" Bronze Star)	American Campaign Medal
Asiatic-Pacific Campaign Medal w/ one 3/16" Silver Star	World War II Victory Medal	National Defense Service Medal w/ one 3/16" Bronze Star
Korean Service Medal w/ four 3/16" Bronze Stars	Vietnam Service Medal w/ three 3/16" Bronze Stars	National Order of Vietnam; Officer
National Order of Vietnam; Knight	Vietnam Army Distinguished Service Order; 2nd Class	Republic of Vietnam Gallantry Cross w/ three Palms
Vietnam Public Health Service Medal, 1st class	Republic of Korea Presidential Unit Citation w/ service star	Republic of Vietnam Gallantry Cross Unit Citation w/ Palm and Frame
United Nations Korea Medal	Vietnam Campaign Medal	Republic of Korea War Service Medal

=== Medal of Honor citation ===
Rank and organization: Lieutenant Colonel, U.S. Marine Corps Commanding Officer, 1st Battalion, 7th Marines, 1st Marine Division (Rein.). Place and date: Vicinity Hagaru-ri, Korea, 1 through 4 December 1950. Entered service at: Atlanta, Ga. Born: January 13, 1915, Fitzgerald, Ga.

Citation:

For conspicuous gallantry and intrepidity at the risk of his life above and beyond the call of duty as commanding officer of the 1st Battalion, in action against enemy aggressor forces. Although keenly aware that the operation involved breaking through a surrounding enemy and advancing 8 miles along primitive icy trails in the bitter cold with every passage disputed by a savage and determined foe, Lt. Col. Davis boldly led his Battalion into the attack in a daring attempt to relieve a beleaguered rifle company and to seize, hold, and defend a vital mountain pass controlling the only route available for two Marine Regiments in danger of being cut off by numerically superior hostile forces during their re-deployment to the port of Hungnam. When the Battalion immediately encountered strong opposition from entrenched enemy forces commanding high ground in the path of the advance, he promptly spearheaded his unit in a fierce attack up the steep, ice-covered slopes in the face of withering fire and, personally leading the assault groups in a hand-to-hand encounter, drove the hostile troops from their positions, rested his men, and reconnoitered the area under enemy fire to determine the best route for continuing the mission. Always in the thick of the fighting Lt. Col. Davis led his Battalion over 3 successive ridges in the deep snow in continuous attacks against the enemy and, constantly inspiring and encouraging his men throughout the night, brought his unit to a point within 1,500 yards of the surrounded rifle company by daybreak. Although knocked to the ground when a shell fragment struck his helmet and 2 bullets pierced his clothing, he arose and fought his way forward at the head of his men until he reached the isolated Marines. On the following morning, he bravely led his Battalion in securing the vital mountain pass from a strongly entrenched and numerically superior hostile force, carrying all his wounded with him, including 22 litter cases and numerous ambulatory patients. Despite repeated savage and heavy assaults by the enemy, he stubbornly held the vital terrain until the two Regiments of the Division had deployed through the pass and, on the morning of 4 December, led his Battalion into Hagaru-ri intact. By his superb leadership, outstanding courage, and brilliant tactical ability, Lt. Col. Davis was directly instrumental in saving the beleaguered rifle company from complete annihilation and enabled the two Marine Regiments to escape possible destruction. His valiant devotion to duty and unyielding fighting spirit in the face of almost insurmountable odds enhance and sustain the highest traditions of the U.S. Naval Service.

=== Navy Cross citation ===
Citation:

The President of the United States takes pleasure in presenting the Navy Cross to Raymond Gilbert Davis (0–5831), Major, U.S. Marine Corps, for extraordinary heroism as Commanding Officer of the First Battalion, First Marines, FIRST Marine Division, in action against enemy Japanese forces on Peleliu, Palau Islands from 15 to September 22, 1944. Although wounded during the first hour of landing, Major Davis refused evacuation to remain with his Battalion's assault elements in many hazardous missions. On one occasion, when large gaps occurred in our front lines as the result of heavy casualties, and his right flank company was disorganized by point-blank enemy cannon fire following a successful nine hundred yard penetration through heavily defended lines, he rallied and personally led combined troops into these gaps to establish contact and maintain hasty defensive positions for the remainder of the night. Despite many casualties from close-range sniper fire, he remained in the vicinity of the front lines, coordinating artillery and Naval gunfire support with such effect that several determined counterattacks were repulsed. His outstanding courage, devotion to duty and leadership were in keeping with the highest traditions of the United States Naval Service.

=== First Silver Star citation ===
Citation:

The President of the United States of America, authorized by Act of Congress July 9, 1918, takes pleasure in presenting the Silver Star (Army Award) to Lieutenant Colonel Raymond Gilbert Davis (MCSN: 0-5831), United States Marine Corps, for conspicuous gallantry and intrepidity in action against the enemy in Korea during the period 2 November to 8 November 1950. Lieutenant Colonel Davis was serving as Commanding Officer of the First Battalion, Seventh Marines, FIRST Marine Division on 3 November 1950. At about 0130, 3 November the enemy conducted a fierce, coordinated night attack against the First Battalion, Seventh Marines. Lieutenant Colonel Davis moved from point to point on the line wherever there was danger of the enemy breaking through, continually exposing himself to heavy enemy small arms and mortar fire without personal regard for his own safety. His display of leadership, initiative and courage was a constant inspiration to the officers and men about him. It was through his actions that the lines held and the enemy was repulsed. During the daylight hours of 3 November Lieutenant Colonel Davis maneuvered elements of his command in such a manner as to route the enemy. Once again Lieutenant Colonel Davis' display of leadership and courage acted as an inspiration to the officers and men of his command. It was a direct result of Lieutenant Colonel Davis' actions that the First Battalion was able to break through and continue the attack in its zone of action.

=== Second Silver Star citation ===
Citation:

The President of the United States of America takes pleasure in presenting a Gold Star in lieu of a Second Award of the Silver Star to Lieutenant Colonel Raymond Gilbert Davis (MCSN: 0-5831), United States Marine Corps, for conspicuous gallantry and intrepidity as Commanding Officer of the First Battalion, Seventh Marines, FIRST Marine Division (Reinforced), in action against enemy aggressor forces in Korea on 30 September 1950. Assigned the task of seizing two hills located at the southern end of the Seoul-Uijongbu corridor, Lieutenant Colonel Davis boldly led his battalion against a well-entrenched enemy force in the face of hostile small-arms, automatic-weapons and mortar fire. Keenly aware that the unit had been assembled and organized only six weeks previously and that this was its first attack, he advanced with the assault elements and, moving from platoon to platoon to encourage the men, inspired his battalion to rout the enemy and capture its objective quickly. By his marked courage, brilliant leadership and steadfast devotion to duty, Lieutenant Colonel Davis upheld the highest traditions of the United States Naval Service.

== Other honors ==
- In 2003, General Davis was awarded the James A. Van Fleet Award by the Korea Society.
- The building that houses the Marine Corps Combat Development Command (the Marine Corps Development and Education Command until 1987) at Marine Corps Base Quantico is named the "General Raymond G. Davis Center".
- In 2007, Ray Davis Middle school celebrated its inaugural year.

== Death ==
General Davis died of a heart attack at the age of 88 on September 3, 2003, in Conyers, Georgia. Interment was at Forest Lawn Memorial Gardens in College Park, Georgia. His Funeral Detail and Honor Guard were personally commanded by General Michael W. Hagee, 33rd commandant of the Marine Corps.

== Gallery ==
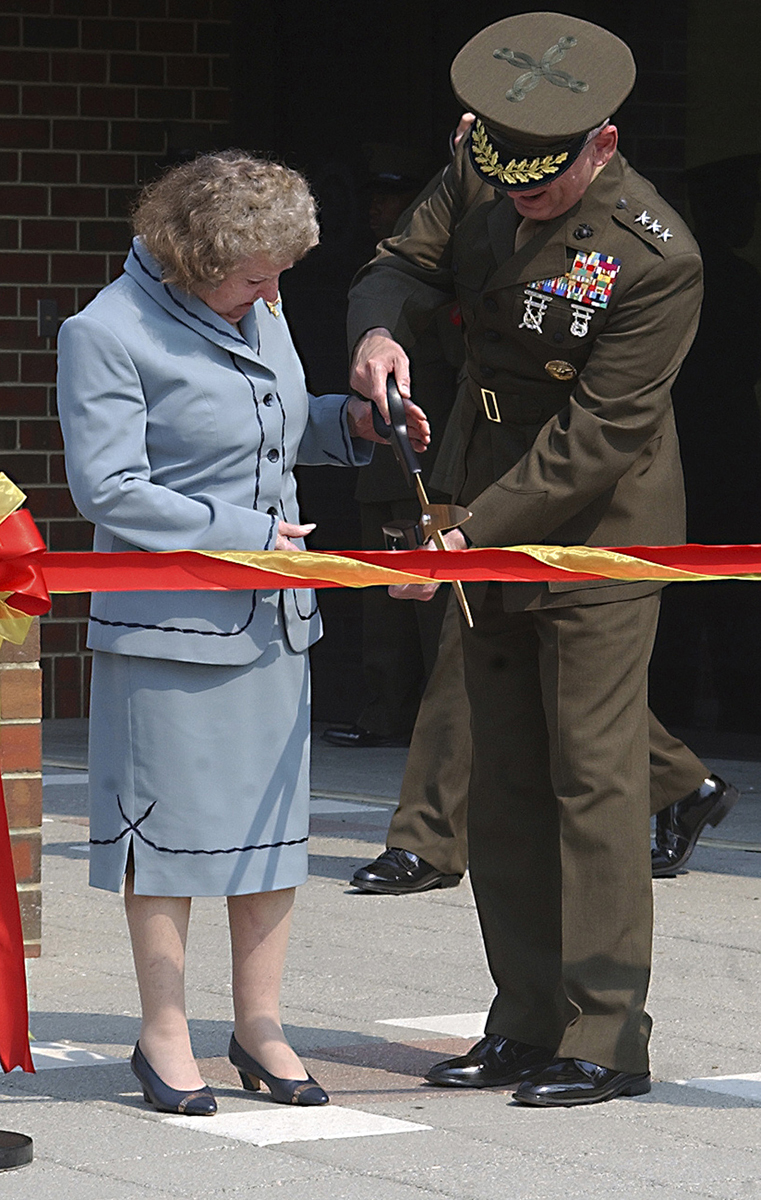
Lt. Gen. James Mattis, commanding general, Marine Corps Combat Development Command, and Willa Knox Davis cut the ribbion during the General Raymond G. Davis Center dedication ceremony.

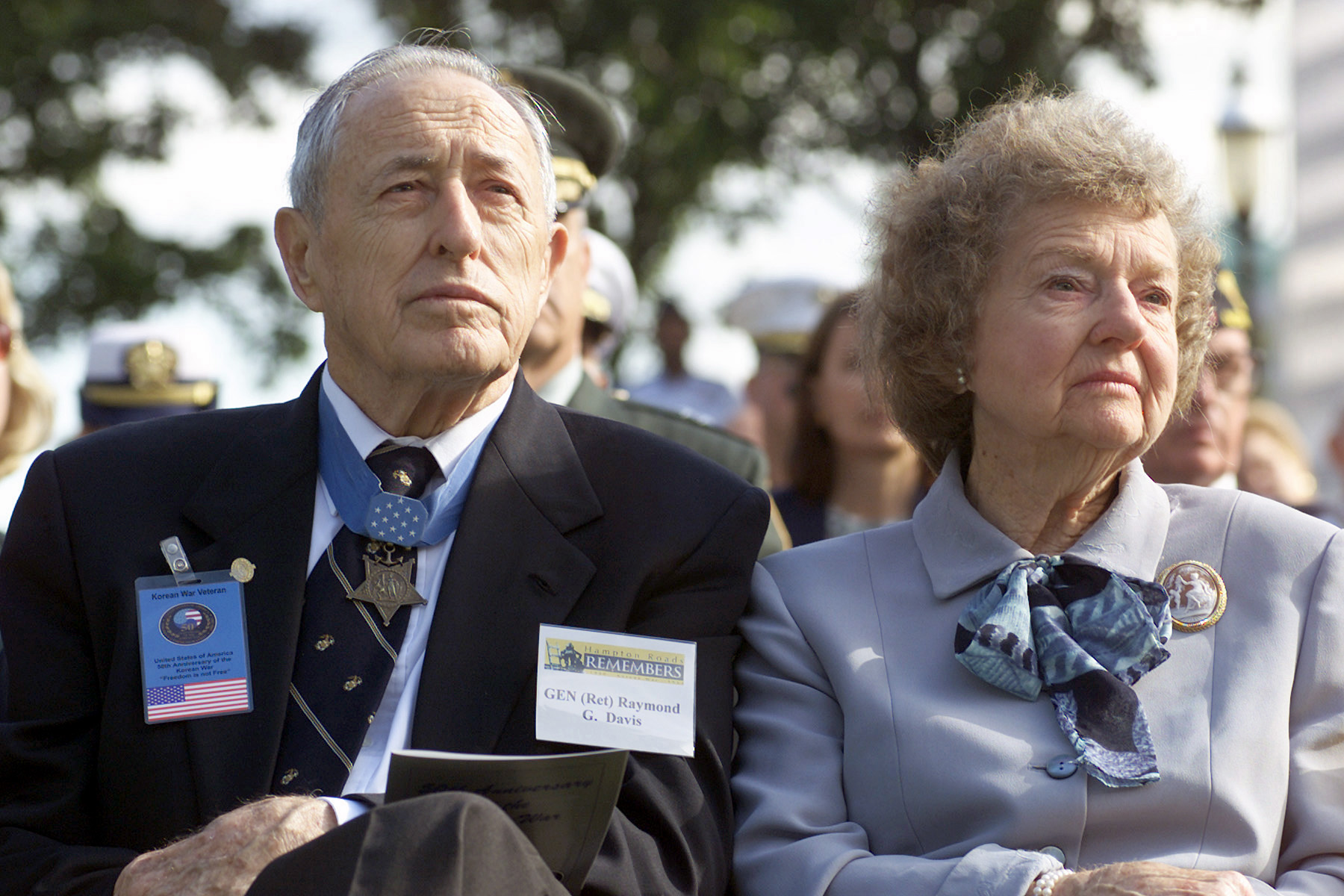
General Davis and his wife at the ceremony commemorating the 50th anniversary of the Korean War in 2000.

== See also ==
- List of Medal of Honor recipients
- List of Korean War Medal of Honor recipients
