= James L. Fowler =

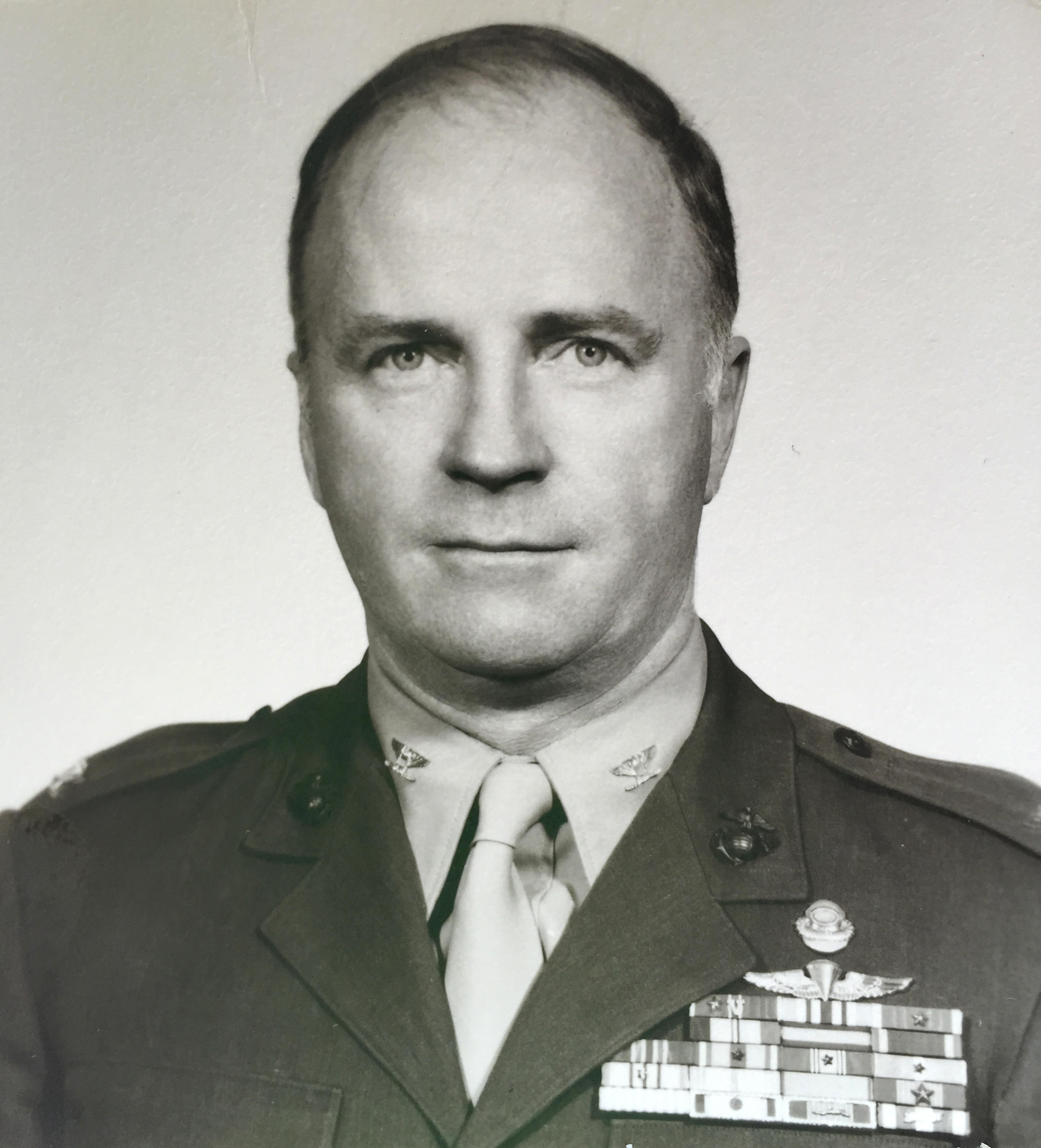
Colonel James L. Fowler

Colonel James Loftus Fowler (January 11, 1931 – January 20, 2015) was an American Marine who was the founder of the Marine Corps Marathon, an annual race since 1976 in Washington, D.C. He was a veteran of the Korean and Vietnam Wars. The race, which now draws tens of thousands of athletes, was intended to promote goodwill for the military after the Vietnam War and serve as a United States Marine Corps recruiting tool. With no qualifying standards or monetary prizes, it gives participants a chance to qualify for the Boston Marathon, earning it the nickname "The People's Marathon."

A native of Mineola, New York, Colonel Fowler was the recipient of two Bronze Stars, a Joint Service Commendation Medal, and two Purple Hearts during his service in the Korean War and the Vietnam War. Fowler earned one of the Purple Hearts in 1968, while serving as a lieutenant colonel in the U.S. Marines as battalion commander of the 3rd Battalion, 4th Marines, in action near the Bến Hải River on the border between North and South Vietnam. This medal was photographed for the image on the United States Postal Service's Purple Heart stamp, first issued in 2003.

He died on January 20, 2015, in Alexandria, Virginia, at the age of 84. He was buried at the Arlington National Cemetery. He was survived by his wife, Betsy Goodwyn Blackwell.

== Education ==
Fowler graduated in 1952 from Dartmouth College. He went on to receive numerous advanced degrees: a law degree from Georgetown University Law Center in 1958, a master of business administration degree from the University of Virginia in 1960, a master of laws degree from Georgetown in 1961, a master's degree in business from Columbia Business School in 1973 and a master's degree in history from Georgetown University in 1979.
