= Wallace H. Robinson =

United States Marine Corps general

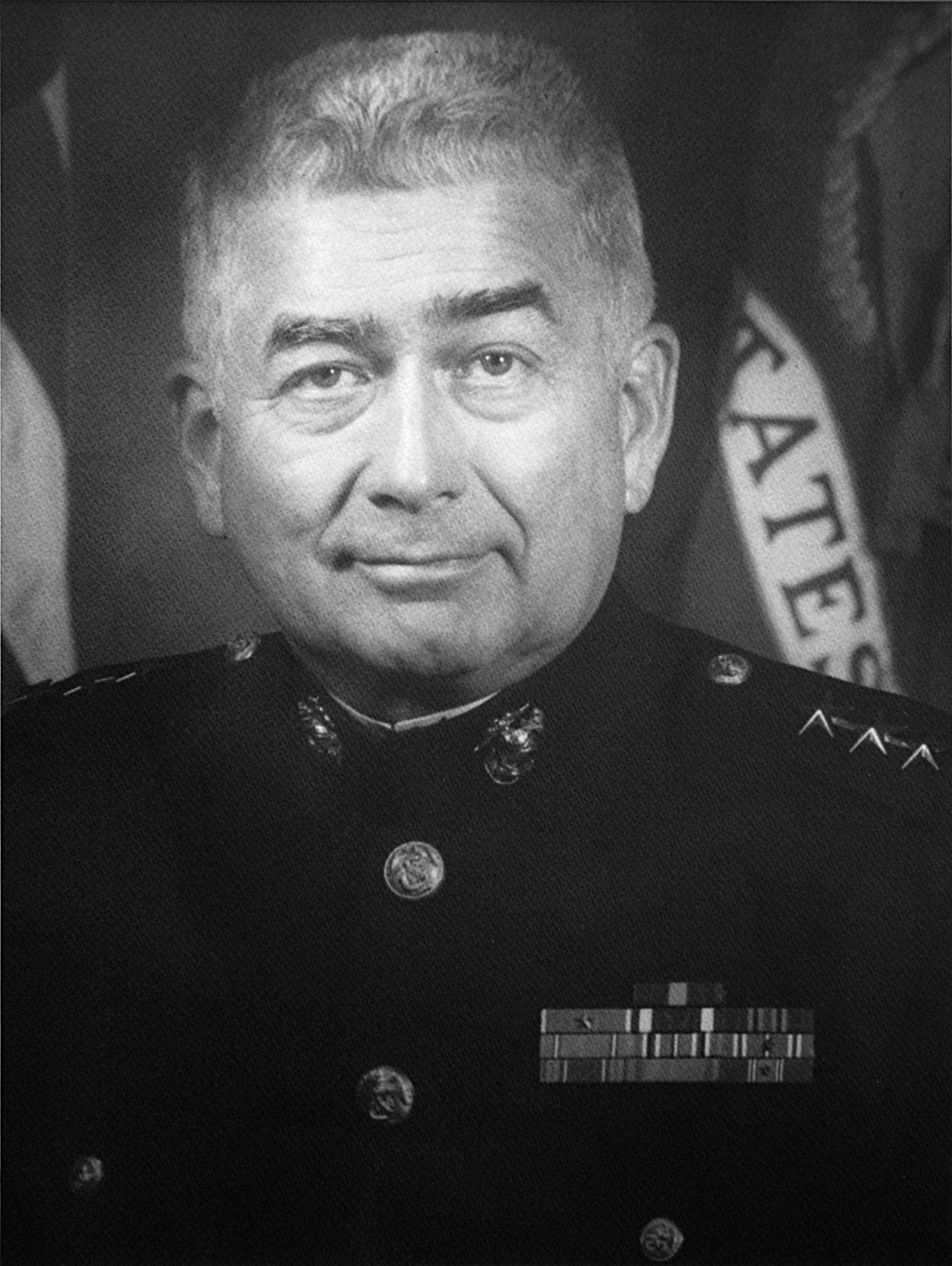
- Robinson as Director of the Defense Supply Agency
- Born: February 11, 1920; Washington, D.C.
- Died: August 17, 2013 (aged 93); Washington, D.C.
- Military career
- Allegiance: United States of America
- Branch: United States Marine Corps
- Service years: 1940–1976
- Rank: Lieutenant General
- Commands: Defense Supply Agency
- Conflicts: World War II
- Awards: Defense Distinguished Service Medal; Distinguished Service Medal; Legion of Merit (2)

Lieutenant General Wallace H. Robinson (February 11, 1920 – August 17, 2013) was a United States Marine Corps general. LtGen Wallace served in combat during World War II. He served as the 20th Quartermaster General of the Marine Corps (1969–1971) and as Director of the Defense Supply Agency (1971–1976).

== Biography ==
Wallace Robinson was born on February 11, 1920, in Washington, D. C., where he graduated from Roosevelt High School in 1936. He attended Virginia Polytechnic Institute, Blacksburg, Virginia, graduating in 1940, with a Bachelor of Science Degree in Civil Engineering, and was commissioned a Marine Corps second lieutenant in June 1940.

== Military service ==
After completing The Basic School, Philadelphia, Pennsylvania, in February 1941, he attended the Base Weapons Course, Marine Corps School, Quantico, Virginia, and on graduation in June 1941, joined 5th Defense Battalion, Fleet Marine Force, at Marine Corps Recruit Depot Parris Island, South Carolina.

While serving overseas during World War II in the Second Defense Battalion, 2nd Marine Brigade, Fleet Marine Force (FMF), he rose from lieutenant to major, participating in the occupation and defense of Samoan, Wallis, and Ellice Islands. During this period, he served variously as platoon, battery and group commander in artillery and automatic weapons organizations. In November 1943, still with the Second Defense Battalion, but attached to the 2nd Marine Division, he participated in the assault and later the occupation and defense Tarawa, Gilbert Islands, as Executive Officer, Betio Groupment.

Returning to Kauai, Hawaiian Islands, in March 1944, he served as Executive, then Commanding Officer of the Second Antiaircraft Artillery Battalion until returning to the United States in October.

In 1945, after nine months in the United States assigned as instructor, then Director of the Officers Antiaircraft Artillery School at Camp LeJeune, North Carolina, he returned to the Pacific and served briefly as Assistant G-4, Headquarters, FMF, Pacific, in Hawaii. He was transferred to Northern China as Executive Officer, then Commanding Officer, 1st Separate Engineer Battalion, III Amphibious Corps, FMF, where he directed major construction projects throughout the III Amphibious Corps area, incident to the occupation of Peking, Tientsin, and other cities in that area.

Bringing his battalion back to the United States in August 1946, he subsequently was assigned as the Base Engineer and Maintenance Officer, Camp Pendleton, California, then the largest base in the Marine Corps. Moving to the Marine Corps Recruit Depot Parris Island, South Carolina, in 1947, he served as Base Maintenance Officer until October 1949 when, after promotion to lieutenant colonel, he was reassigned to Headquarters Marine Corps, in Washington, D. C., where he assumed duties as Assistant Director of the Utilities and Public Works Division, Supply Department.

At the onset of the Korean War in 1950, he was assigned as Officer in Charge, Marine Corps Coastal Survey Team #1, directing survey work in the Persian Gulf area of the Middle East, and returned to the United States in his former billet at Headquarters Marine Corps in late 1951.

He was then selected for assignment to the Industrial College of the Armed Forces and upon graduation therefrom in 1959, was named Special Assistant to the Quartermaster General of the Marine Corps until March 1962, when he was selected to serve as a member of the Secretary of the Navy's Planning Staff for review of the Management of the Department of Navy.

After that study was completed, he was assigned to the 3rd Marine Division, FMF, on Okinawa, as Commanding Officer, 3d Force Service Regiment. In 1964, he returned to the United States for Duty as Chief of Staff, Marine Corps Supply Activity, Philadelphia, Pennsylvania.

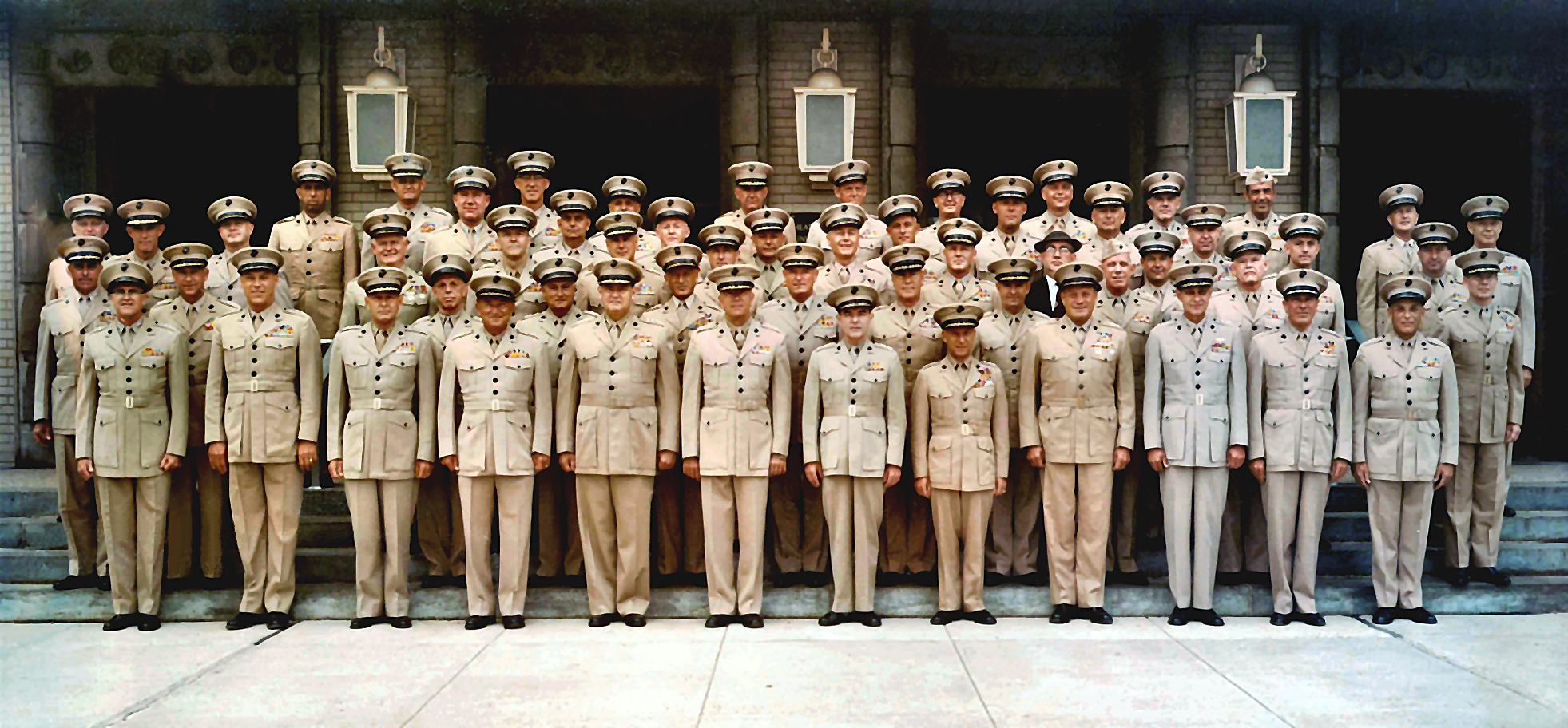
Robinson (3rd from right, 2nd row from top) at the 1967 General Officers Symposium

General Robinson was promoted to brigadier general on March 14, 1966, on which date he assumed command of the Supply Activity. While serving in that assignment, on August 1, 1967, he was promoted to major general.

Detached in January 1969, General Robinson moved to Headquarters Marine Corps where he assumed duty as the twentieth Quartermaster General of the Marine Corps on March 1, 1969. While serving in this capacity, he was nominated for promotion to lieutenant general, his nomination was approved by President Nixon in February 1971, and confirmed by the United States Senate on March 12, 1971. He received his third star upon assuming duties as Director, Defense Supply Agency, Cameron Station, Alexandria, Virginia, on August 1, 1971. He was placed on the retired list on January 1, 1976, but was returned to active duty without interruption of service as Special Assistant to the Commandant of the Marine Corps until February 11, 1976.

Lieutenant General Wallace H. Robinson, Jr., was placed on the retired list on January 1, 1976, and was released from active service on February 11, 1976. He died on August 17, 2013, and is now buried at Arlington Cemetery with his wife, Irine Robinson.

== Education ==
In addition to his engineering degree, General Robinson also held a degree of Master Business Administration, which he received from George Washington University in 1961. He was also a registered civil and industrial engineer.

== Awards and decorations ==
His medals and decorations include:

- Defense Distinguished Service Medal
- Navy Distinguished Service Medal
- Legion of Merit (with one gold star in lieu of a second award)
- Joint Service Commendation Medal
- Navy and Marine Corps Commendation Medal
