= Red Beach Base Area =

Site information
- Type: Marines/Navy/Army

Location
- Coordinates: 16.096°N 108.143°E

Site history
- Built: 1965
- In use: 1965–present
- Battles/wars: Vietnam War

Red Beach Airfield
- IATA: none; ICAO: none

Summary
- Elevation AMSL: 3 ft (0.91 m)

Runways
Direction	Length		Surface
Direction	ft	m	Surface
	1,500	457	PSP

Red Beach Base Area (also known as Camp JK Books, Camp Haskins, Camp Viking, Paddock Compound or Red Beach Camp) is a complex of former U.S. Marines, Navy and Army and Army of the Republic of Vietnam (ARVN) logistics and support bases northwest of Danang.

== History ==
The base was located along Highway 1, 8 km northwest of Danang at Red Beach, the site of the landing of the 9th Marine Regiment, the first US combat troops deployed to South Vietnam on 8 March 1965.

The area comprised a number of separate adjacent bases as follows:

- Camp JK Books, Headquarters of Force Logistics Command, U.S. Marine Corps, responsible to III Marine Amphibious Force (III MAF).
- Camp Haskins, split into Camp Haskins North used as a base for the 31st Naval Construction Regiment and Camp Haskins South which was used as the Headquarters, III MAF after their move from Camp Horn in March 1970
- Camp Viking, base for the 58th Transport Battalion from February 1968 to April 1972 and the 39th Engineer Battalion
- Paddock Compound, base for the 18th Engineer Brigade

The base area was handed over to the ARVN in March 1972. Camp Viking was used by the ARVN 102nd Artillery Battalion.

== Current use ==
The area has largely been turned over to housing although part of it remains in use by the People's Army of Vietnam.
