= Louis Metzger =

Marine corps officer

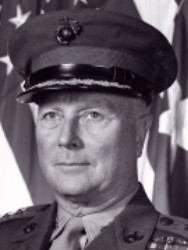
- Born: November 18, 1916; San Francisco, California, U.S.
- Died: July 28, 2005 (aged 88); San Diego, California, U.S.
- Burial place: El Camino Memorial Park
- Spouses: Jane Thornton Metzger (m. 1942; d. 1994); Joan Metzger (m. 1995)
- Children: Dirk; Scott; Peter
- Military career
- Allegiance: United States of America
- Branch: United States Marine Corps
- Service years: 1939–1973
- Rank: Lieutenant General
- Commands: 1st Armored Amphibian Battalion; 1st Battalion, 1st Marines; 9th Marine Amphibious Brigade; I Marine Amphibious Force; 3rd Marine Division; III Marine Amphibious Force
- Conflicts: World War II: Battle of Kwajalein; Battle of Guam; Battle of Okinawa; Korean War Vietnam War
- Awards: Navy Distinguished Service Medal; Legion of Merit (with "V"); Bronze Star Medal (with "V")

Louis Metzger (November 18, 1916 – July 28, 2005) was a decorated United States Marine Corps officer who attained the rank of lieutenant general. He held combat leadership roles in World War II, Korea, and Vietnam and is credited as one of the primary architects of the Marine Corps' armored vehicle force in World War II. Metzger also formed and commanded the 1st Armored Amphibian Battalion during that conflict at age 27.

== Early life and education ==
Louis Metzger was born on November 18, 1916, in San Francisco, California, to Louis M. Metzger and Lillian Baddeley Metzger. His father, Louis, was a prominent businessman and co-principal of the general brokerage firm, Metzger & Franklin, and is credited as one of the "men who made San Francisco". His father died in 1926 when Metzger was 9 years old. Metzger later attended Stanford University and was a member of the Phi Kappa Psi fraternity there. He graduated with a B.A. in economics in 1939.

== Military career ==
On July 1, 1939, Metzger accepted a commission as a second lieutenant in the United States Marine Corps. He completed Officers' Basic School at the Basic School, Philadelphia Naval Shipyard in the summer of 1940. He subsequently joined the Marine detachment on the USS New Orleans which was located around Hawaii at the time. He later served as a company officer in infantry and tank units for the 2nd Marine Division in San Diego, California, in the summer of 1941. At the start of World War II, Metzger sailed to Samoa with the 1st Provisional Marine Brigade. He was promoted to captain in May 1942 before returning to the United States to attend the Armor School in Fort Knox, Kentucky. He was later transferred to the Tank Training Center in Camp Elliott, California and was promoted to major in April 1943.

=== World War II ===
In July 1943, at age 27, Metzger formed the 1st Armored Amphibian Battalion, and assumed command of the battalion a month later. He led the unit in battles in the Marshall Islands (Battle of Kwajalein), Guam (Battle of Guam), and Japan (Battle of Okinawa). He served as commanding officer of the battalion for 25 months. Military historians largely regard Metzger as one of the primary architects of the Marine Corps' armored vehicle force having led the first Landing Vehicle Tracked (LVT(A)) unit and written most of the armored amphibious doctrine for the vehicle's use in combat. He was also awarded the Legion of Merit with Combat "V" for his service during the Battle of Okinawa, where he volunteered to lead in the initial wave of combat on that Japanese island stronghold. In the weeks preceding the amphibious assault on Okinawa, he was promoted to lieutenant colonel.

In August 1945, Metzger was named the Chief of Staff of the Third Fleet Landing Force and was responsible for furnishing Naval forces to occupy Japan. He was given his first Navy Commendation Medal for his role as Chief of Staff. He returned to the 6th Marine Division the following month eventually assuming the role of Operations Officer. In that role, he helped facilitate the surrender and disarmament of the 32nd Japanese Army in Qingdao, China.

After returning home from the Pacific, Metzger spent three years at the Marine Corps' Division of Plans and Policies in Washington, D.C. He followed that by studying a year at the Army Command and General Staff College in Fort Leavenworth, Kansas. Between 1950 and 1953 he served as an instructor and supervisory instructor at the Marine Corps Schools at Quantico.

=== Korean War and subsequent service ===
In June 1953, he became the executive officer of the 1st Marine Division's Kimpo Provisional Regiment during the Korean War. He would later serve as the commanding officer of the 1st Battalion, 1st Marines in Korea. For his service there, he was awarded the Bronze Star Medal.

After returning from Korea, Metzger accepted a role as assistant naval attaché at the U.S. embassy in London, England, where he stayed until June 1956. He was also promoted to colonel in 1955. Upon his return to the United States, Metzger served as branch head at Headquarters Marine Corps and eventually as executive officer of the fiscal division. He graduated from the National War College in 1960 before taking on a role as chief of staff of the 1st Marine Division at Camp Pendleton until May 1962. Subsequently, he served as assistant chief of staff at U.S. Forces Headquarters in Japan and returned to Headquarters Marine Corps in 1964 as assistant deputy chief of staff (programs). He was promoted to brigadier general in 1965. In 1966, he became the first director of the Management Analysis Group (MAG) at Headquarters Marine Corps.

=== Vietnam War ===
Metzger served two tours of duty in the Vietnam War. For his first tour, he was ordered overseas in January 1967 as the commanding general of the 9th Marine Amphibious Brigade. He later served as assistant division commander for the 3rd Marine Division. He was awarded a gold star in lieu of an additional Bronze Star Medal with Combat "V" for operations against enemy combatants that occurred on October 29, 1967. He was promoted to major general in January 1968.

After his first tour, he returned to the Headquarters Marine Corps serving as a deputy chief of staff for three years. Metzger also attended flight school around that time (a notable exception for such a senior officer) to become a helicopter pilot because he wanted to be able to "look his men in the eye and talk to them about their business with first-hand knowledge." In 1971, he returned to the Far East where he served as commanding general of the I Marine Amphibious Force and the Third Marine Division in Okinawa. That year, he was also nominated to the rank of lieutenant general. President Richard Nixon approved the nomination in November and the Senate confirmed it December. He was advanced to three-stars later that month.

In January 1972, he was assigned as the commanding general of the III Marine Amphibious Force. In lieu of a second Distinguished Service Medal, he was awarded a gold star in January 1973. He retired from active duty in February 1973.

== Post-military career ==
Metzger was the foreman of the San Diego County Grand Jury in 1975 and 1976. During his time as the foreman, the jury indicted C. Arnholt Smith for his role in the collapse of U.S. National Bank. In 1979, he was appointed by the court as the trustee of MB Financial, a bankrupt, San Diego–based investment firm. He was also appointed as the permanent bankruptcy trustee for J. David & Co., a La Jolla–based investment firm that was forced into bankruptcy by its investors.

In addition to his finance and trustee work, Metzger served as the president of the board of directors at the San Diego Museum of Art in the 1980s. He also served as the chairman of the board for the San Diego Convention and Visitors Bureau, and wrote numerous articles for military journals.

== Personal life ==
Metzger married Jane Thornton, with whom he attended Stanford University, in August 1942. The couple had three sons together: Dirk, Peter, and Scott. Dirk and Scott are both California-based lawyers. Dirk and Peter are former Marine officers. Peter is also a former CIA intelligence officer who served as a Marine military aide in President Ronald Reagan's White House. Peter's son and Louis's grandson (Peter Metzger II, also a former Marine officer and the fourth in their family) currently serves in Donald Trump's presidential administration on the National Security Council. Jane died of cancer in 1994 after 52 years of marriage. Metzger remarried in 1995 and remained so until his own death from congestive heart failure on July 28, 2005, at the age of 88. He was buried at El Camino Memorial Park in San Diego.

== Decorations ==
Lieutenant General Metzger's military awards and decorations include:

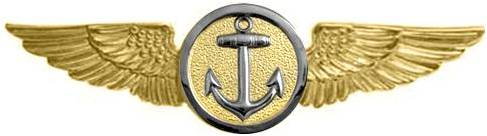

Naval Aviation Observer wings
1st Row	Navy Distinguished Service Medal with one 5/16" Gold Star		Legion of Merit with Combat "V"	
2nd Row	Bronze Star Medal with one 5/16" Gold Star and Combat "V"	Navy and Marine Corps Commendation Medal	Navy Presidential Unit Citation with one bronze star	Navy Unit Commendation
3rd Row	Navy Meritorious Unit Commendation	China Service Medal	American Defense Service Medal with one bronze star and Fleet Clasp	American Campaign Medal
4th Row	Asiatic-Pacific Campaign Medal with three bronze stars	World War II Victory Medal	Navy Occupation Service Medal with Asia clasp	National Defense Service Medal with one bronze star
5th Row	Korean Service Medal with two bronze stars	Vietnam Service Medal with three bronze stars	National Order of Vietnam, 5th Class	Vietnam Gallantry Cross with Palm
6th Row	United Nations Korea Medal	Republic of Korea Presidential Unit Citation	Vietnam Gallantry Cross Unit Citation	Vietnam Campaign Medal
Rifle Expert Badge
