= Leo J. Dulacki =

United States Marine Corps general

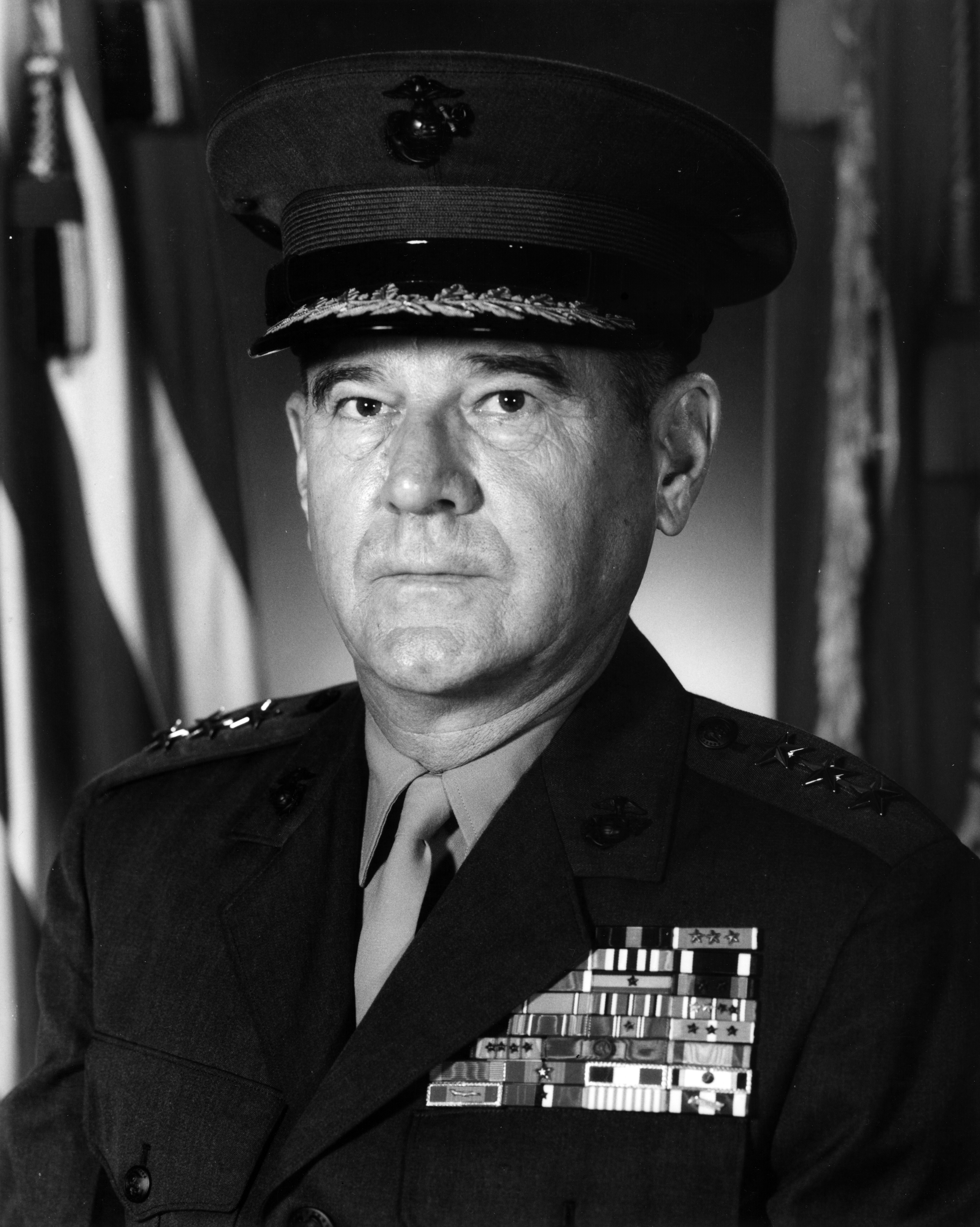
- LTG Leo J. Dulacki, USMC
- Born: Leo John Dulacki; December 29, 1918; Omaha, Nebraska, U.S.
- Died: January 4, 2019 (aged 100); Sun City West, Arizona, U.S.
- Military career
- Allegiance: United States of America
- Branch: United States Marine Corps
- Service years: 1941–1974
- Rank: Lieutenant general
- Service number: 0-8129
- Commands: 5th Marine Division; 4th Marine Division; Chief of Staff of III MAF; 1st Battalion, 7th Marines
- Conflicts: World War II: Doolittle Raid; Battle of Midway; Battle of the Santa Cruz Islands; Gilbert and Marshall Islands campaign; Mariana and Palau Islands campaign; Battle of the Philippine Sea; Korean War: Jamestown Line; Vietnam War: Operation Starlite; Operation Harvest Moon
- Awards: Distinguished Service Medal (2); Legion of Merit (4); Bronze Star Medal (2); Purple Heart

Leo John Dulacki (December 29, 1918 – January 4, 2019) was a highly decorated lieutenant general in the United States Marine Corps. During his 32 years of active service Dulacki held several important intelligence assignments including service in Moscow and Helsinki. He finished his career as director of personnel/deputy chief of staff for manpower at Headquarters Marine Corps.

During World War II he served aboard the aircraft carrier USS Hornet, which was sunk in October 1942. He later commanded the Marine infantry battalion in Korea, where he was wounded and subsequently decorated for his bravery; he also served two tours of duty in Vietnam.

== Early career and World War II ==
Dulacki was born on December 29, 1918, in Omaha, Nebraska, as the son of Stanley and Anna (Jurczak) Dulacki, first generation Polish immigrants. He graduated from Omaha South High School in summer 1936 and subsequently enrolled at Creighton University. During his time at the university, Dulacki was active in golf and the chemistry club, and also served as president of the Polish Club and Student Union Board of Governors. He graduated with a Bachelor of Science degree in June 1941 and was commissioned a reserve second lieutenant within ROTC unit.

Dulacki resigned his reserve commission in order to accept an appointment as a second lieutenant in the Marine Corps on September 2, 1941. Dulacki was subsequently ordered to the Basic School at Philadelphia Navy Yard for basic officer training which he completed in November of that year. He was subsequently attached to the Marine detachment aboard the newly commissioned aircraft carrier USS Hornet under Captain Marc Mitscher. At the time of the Japanese attack on Pearl Harbor, Hornet trained out of Norfolk.

Dulacki served aboard the Hornet during the Doolittle Raid on Tokyo in April 1942 and was promoted to the rank of first lieutenant in September of that year. He was aboard when the carrier participated in the Battle of Midway in June 1942, and later when it was sunk during the Battle of the Santa Cruz Islands on October 26, 1942. He was rescued by escorting destroyers and sent to Pearl Harbor, Hawaii where he was promoted to the rank of captain in March 1943. Dulacki assumed command of the Marine detachment aboard the newly commissioned light aircraft carrier USS Belleau Wood and took part in the Gilbert and Marshall Islands and Mariana and Palau Islands campaigns during 1944. He was promoted to the rank of major in January 1944. Dulacki subsequently took part in the Battle of the Philippine Sea, during which Belleau Wood was severely damaged by a kamikaze in October 1944.

Belleau Wood sailed for Hunters Point Naval Shipyard, California, for repairs in November of that year and Dulacki was detached from the ship in early 1945. He was then ordered to Kansas City, Missouri, as officer in charge of the local Marine Corps recruiting office.

== Postwar service ==
Dulacki served in Kansas City until the summer of 1947, when he was ordered to the Junior Course at the Marine Corps Schools, Quantico. He completed the course in August 1947 and was transferred to the Marine Corps Recruit Depot Parris Island, where he was tasked by Major General Franklin A. Hart with the organization of the Marine Recruiters School. Dulacki then served as officer in charge of the school until June 1948, when he was ordered to Guam and joined the 1st Marine Provisional Brigade as assistant operations officer under Brigadier General Edward A. Craig. He returned to the United States in November of that year and attended Army Language School in Monterey, California, where he studied Russian.

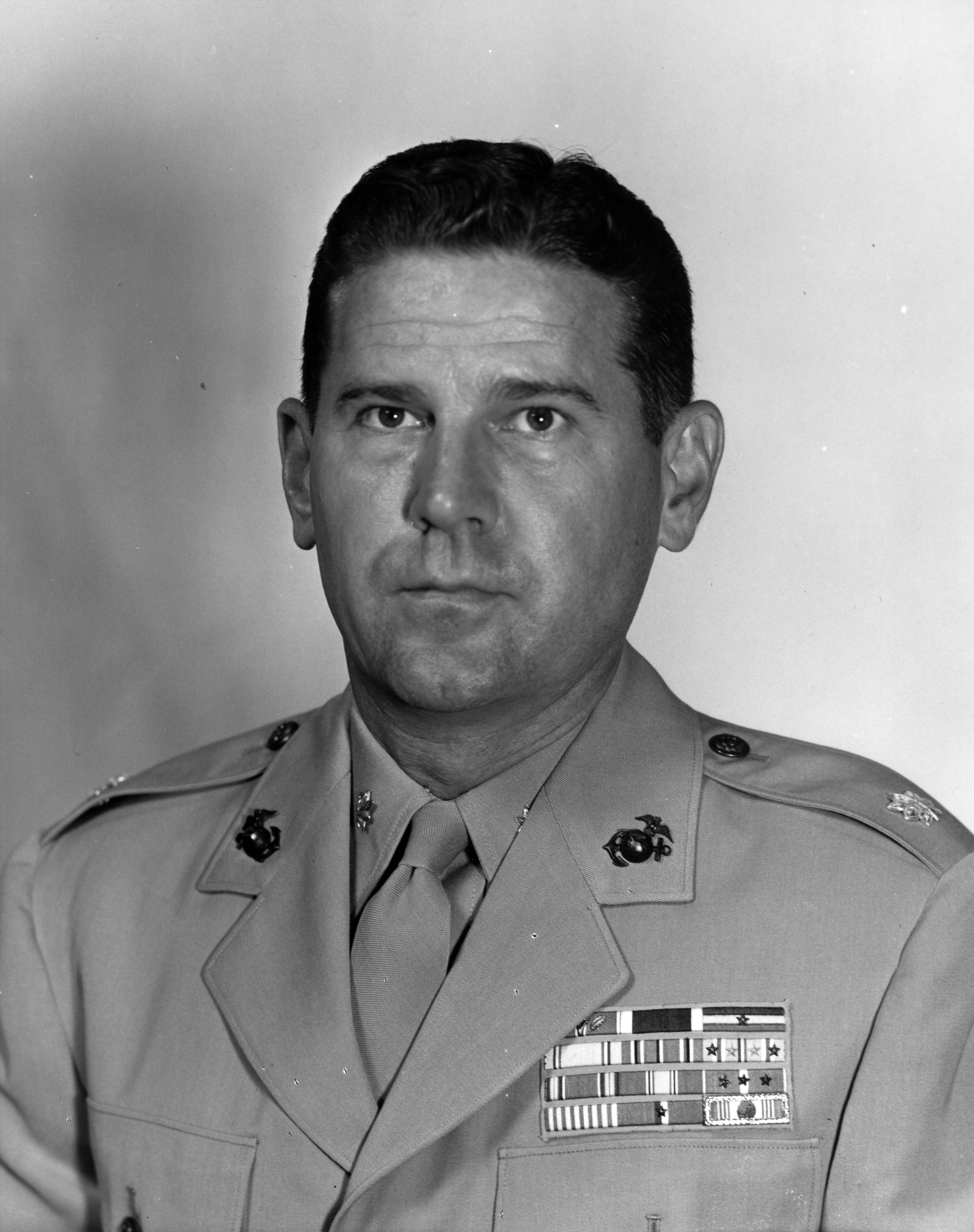
Dulacki as lieutenant colonel following Korea

Upon graduation in October 1949, Dulacki was ordered to Washington, D.C., and attended the Strategic Intelligence School. He was then ordered to Finland and served as Assistant Naval Attache at the American Embassy in Helsinki. During his service there, he was promoted to the rank of lieutenant colonel in January 1951 and received the Commander's Cross of the Order of the Lion of Finland by the Government of Finland.

Dulacki was ordered to Korea in August 1952 and assumed command of the 1st Battalion, 7th Marines, 1st Marine Division. His battalion was deployed on the main line of resistance, the Jamestown Line, which consisted of a series of defensive positions, bunkers, and outposts. During October of that year, the Chinese People's Volunteer Army launched a series of attacks on U.N. positions. Dulacki was wounded by enemy artillery fire, when he was knocked to the ground by the concussion of an enemy artillery round exploding nearby. He led his battalion during the defense of the Hook and successfully defended his objectives. Dulacki remained in his capacity until November 22, 1952, and received the Bronze Star Medal with a Combat "V" for his service on the Jamestown Lines.

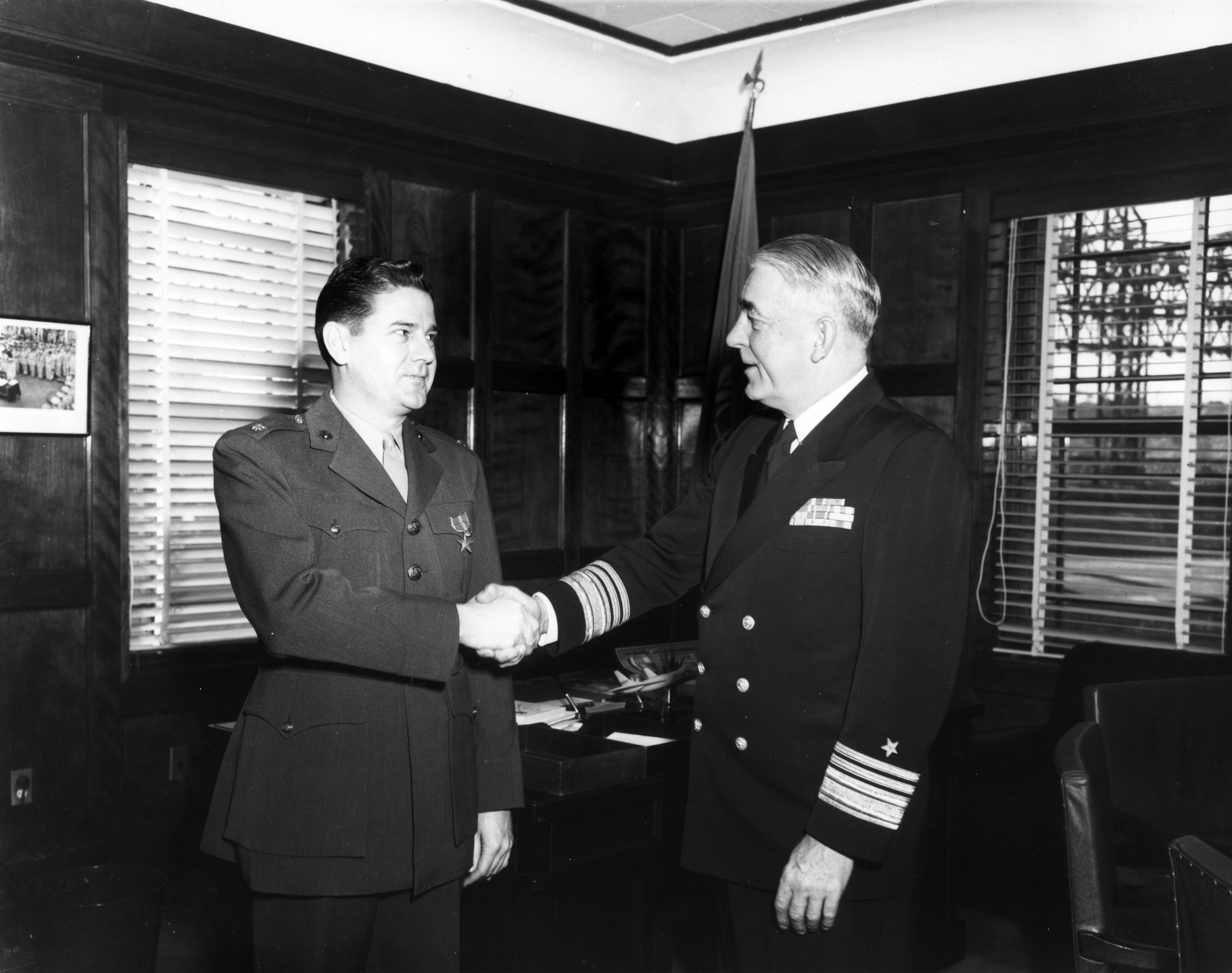
Dulacki (left) receives Bronze Star Medal by Vice admiral Robert P. Briscoe, Commander Naval Forces Far East, for his service in Korea.

He relinquished his command and joined the Korean Truce negotiations team under Rear Admiral John C. Daniel. Dulacki then participated in the Truce talks at Panmunjom on July 27, 1953, and the repatriation of disabled prisoners of war. He distinguished himself in this capacity and received a second Bronze Star Medal.

Dulacki returned to the United States in August 1953 and attended the Senior Course at Marine Corps Schools, Quantico. He graduated in June 1954 and assumed duty as instructor, Intelligence Section at the Schools under Lieutenant General Gerald C. Thomas. He departed Quantico in July 1956 and joined the 1st Marine Division under Major General Robert O. Bare at Camp Pendleton, California. Dulacki served as executive officer, 1st Marine Regiment, and subsequently joined the divisional staff as assistant logistics officer.

During the difficult years of the Cold War, Dulacki left for Moscow in June 1958 and joined the American embassy in Moscow as assistant naval attache and then as naval attache. While in Moscow, he was promoted to the rank of colonel in November 1959 and received the Legion of Merit for his service in that country.

Upon his return to the United States in June 1961, Dulacki was attached to the Joint Chiefs of Staff under General Lyman Lemnitzer and then transferred to the Defense Intelligence Agency in January 1962. He remained in this capacity until May 1964 and received the newly established Joint Service Commendation Medal for service in that capacity. He then attended the Naval War College in Newport, Rhode Island, and graduated in June 1965. During this period, Dulacki also earned a master's degree in International Affairs from George Washington University.

== Vietnam War ==
Dulacki was ordered to South Vietnam in July 1965 and joined the headquarters of III Marine Amphibious Force (III MAF) under Lieutenant General Lewis W. Walt in Da Nang. He served as assistant chief of staff for intelligence under Walt and coordinated collecting, compilation, and analysis of intelligence which was crucial for Operations Starlite, Piranha, and Harvest Moon.

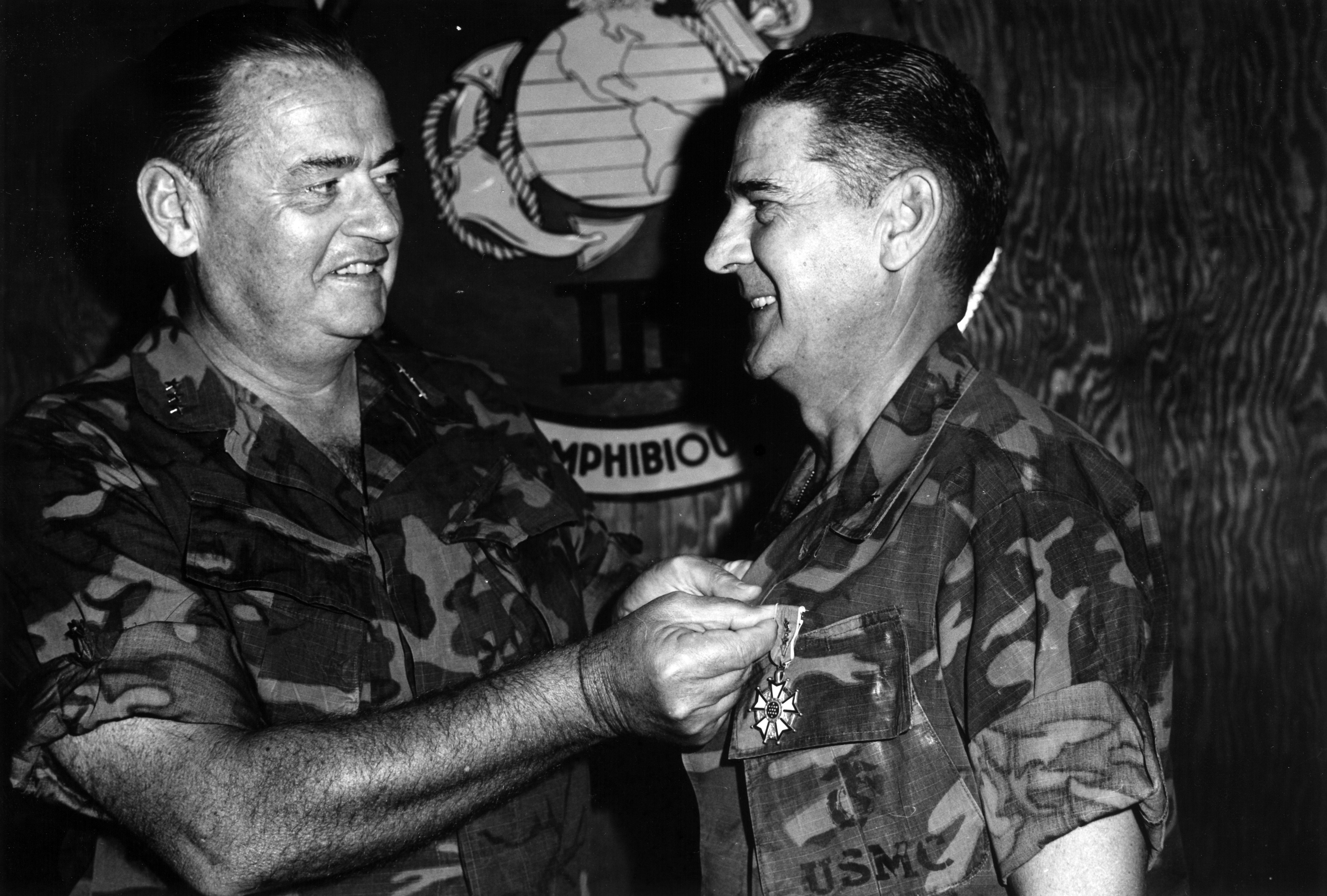
Dulacki (right) receives his fourth Legion of Merit by Commanding general, FMFPAC, Henry W. Buse Jr. during ceremonies at Camp Horn, Vietnam, June 1969.

He served in that capacity until the end of January 1966 and received a second Legion of Merit with a Combat "V" for his service. Dulacki was subsequently transferred to the headquarters of the 3rd Marine Division under Major General Wood B. Kyle and assumed duty as chief of staff. He was stationed at Chu Lai Base and participated in the planning of search and destroy operations in Quảng Nam Province. While in this capacity, he also witnessed the Buddhist Uprising.

Dulacki returned to the United States in May of that year and received a third Legion of Merit for his service with the 3rd Marine Division. Following his return stateside, he assumed duty at Headquarters Marine Corps as the director of the Marine Corps Command Center. He served in this capacity until August 1967, when he was promoted to the rank of brigadier general and appointed assistant director of personnel. The next year, in June 1968, Dulacki transferred to Camp Pendleton, California and was appointed assistant division commander, 5th Marine Division under his former superior, Major General Wood B. Kyle. The division served as a component of the Marine Corps Reserve and trained reservists and replacements during Vietnam War. Following the retirement of General Kyle one month later, Dulacki assumed command of the division and served in this capacity until the end of May 1969. He was decorated with a fourth Legion of Merit for his service with that command.

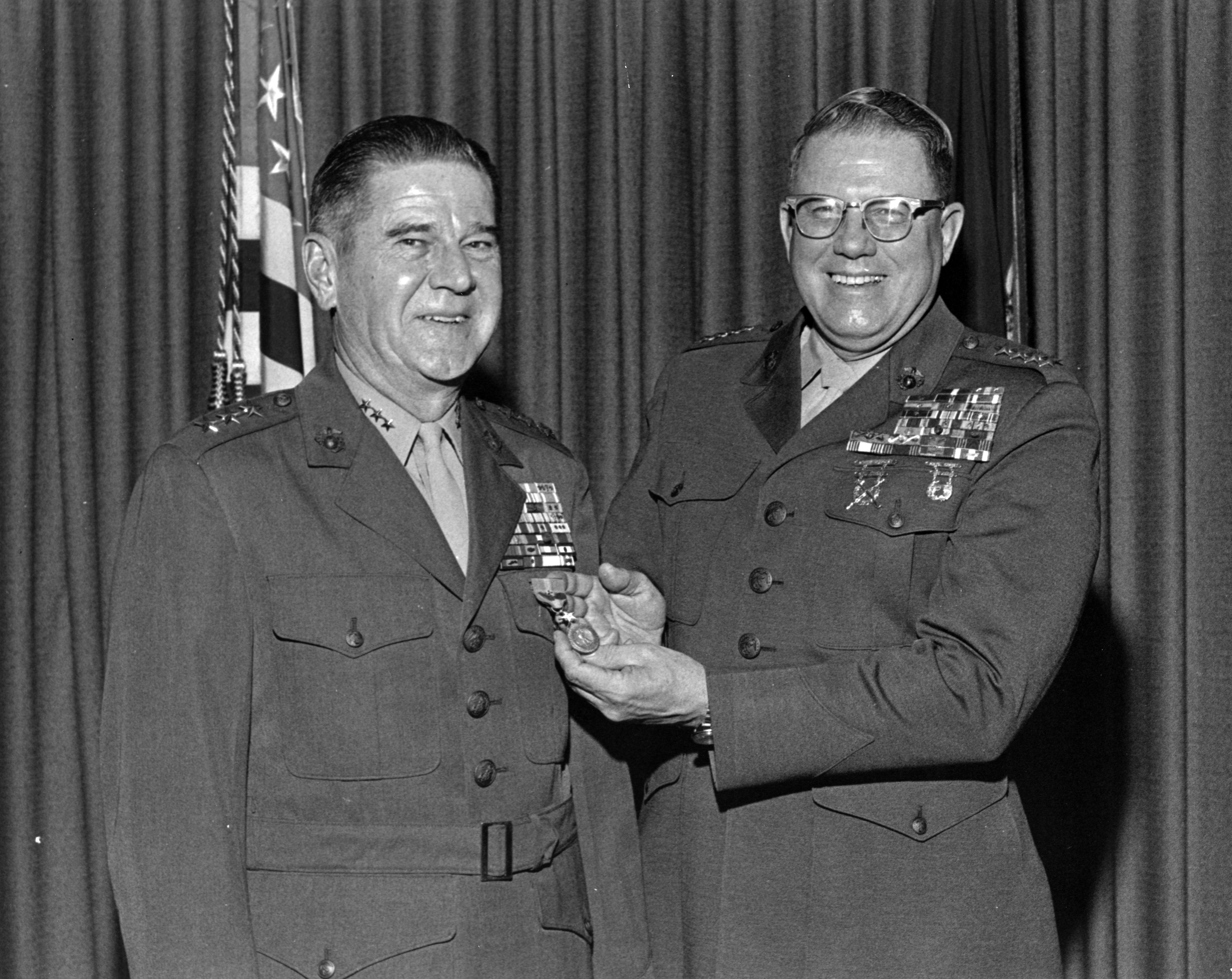
Dulacki (left) receives his second Distinguished Service Medal by Commandant Robert E. Cushman Jr. during his retirement ceremony on December 28, 1973.

Dulacki returned to South Vietnam in June 1969 and assumed duty as operations officer of the III MAF under Lieutenant General Herman Nickerson Jr. He participated in the planning of the redeployment of the 3rd Marine Division, which was detached from III MAF and transferred to Okinawa within Operations Keystone Eagle and Keystone Cardinal. Throughout the rest of 1969, he participated in the planning and execution of several search and destroy operations including Oklahoma Hills, Pipestone Canyon. The units of III MAF inflicted severe losses on the enemy and captured over 17,000 weapons and tons of enemy munitions, supplies, and foodstuffs. Dulacki served in that capacity until December 22, when he succeeded Brigadier General George E. Dooley as chief of staff of III MAF. Dulacki continued in that capacity until mid-June 1970, when he was relieved by Brigadier General Thomas H. Miller and ordered back to the United States.

For his service with III MAF during his second tour in Vietnam, Dulacki was decorated with the Navy Distinguished Service Medal and also received the National Order of Vietnam, Rank Knight, Vietnam Gallantry Cross with Palm and Korean Order of Military Merit, 5th Class.

Following his return, Dulacki assumed command of the 4th Marine Division at Camp Pendleton, California and was again responsible for the training of Marine reservists. He was promoted to the rank of major general on August 17, 1970, and held command of the division until March 1973.

Dulacki then briefly served at Headquarters Marine Corps as Inspector General of the Marine Corps, before he was promoted to the rank of lieutenant general on May 14, 1973, and appointed director of personnel/deputy chief of staff for manpower. He retired from the Marine Corps after almost 32 years of active service on January 1, 1974, and received his second Navy Distinguished Service Medal at his retirement ceremony.

== Retirement ==
Dulacki settled in Carlsbad, California, and was active in several organizations. He served as a member of the board of trustees at the Kosciuszko Foundation between 1974 and 1989, and later in the same capacity with the Devil Pups Youth Foundation until 1990. He also held additional duties as an advisory board member at the National Armed Forces Museum, Smithsonian Institution, and as an honorary trustee of the San Diego Paderewski Society. He was also active in the Marine Corps Oral History Program and received a Certificate of Appreciation from the Commandant of the Marine Corps, Paul X. Kelley in June 1986.

Dulacki was awarded the Alumni Merit Award from his alma mater, Creighton University in 1974 and was inducted into the Attache Hall of Fame of the Defense Intelligence Agency in 1990. His high school, Omaha South High School inducted him into its Hall of Fame in 2013. He died on January 4, 2019, at his retirement home in Sun City West, Arizona, at the age of 100, six days after his birthday.

== Decorations ==
A complete list of the general's medals and decorations include:

1st Row	Navy Distinguished Service Medal with one 5/16" Gold Star			
2nd Row	Legion of Merit with Combat "V" and three 5/16" Gold Stars	Bronze Star Medal with Combat "V" and one 5/16" Gold Star	Joint Service Commendation Medal	Navy Commendation Medal
3rd Row	Purple Heart	Navy Presidential Unit Citation with one star	Navy Unit Commendation	American Defense Service Medal
4th Row	American Campaign Medal	Asiatic-Pacific Campaign Medal with two 3/16 inch silver and two bronze service stars	World War II Victory Medal	National Defense Service Medal with one star
5th Row	Korean Service Medal with three 3/16 inch silver service star	Vietnam Service Medal with four 3/16 inch bronze service stars	Order of the Lion of Finland, rank Commander	Korean Order of Military Merit, 5th Class
6th Row	National Order of Vietnam, Knight	Vietnam Gallantry Cross with Bronze Star	Philippine Republic Presidential Unit Citation	Republic of Korea Presidential Unit Citation
7th Row	Vietnam Gallantry Cross Unit Citation	Philippine Liberation Medal with one star	United Nations Korea Medal	Vietnam Campaign Medal

== See also ==
- 4th Marine Division
- 5th Marine Division

Military offices
Preceded by Donn J. Robertson	Commanding General of the 4th Marine Division; July 15, 1970 – March 4, 1973	Succeeded by John N. McLaughlin
Preceded by Wood B. Kyle	Commanding General of the 5th Marine Division; July 18, 1968 – May 1, 1969	Succeeded by Donn J. Robertson
