= 1st Battalion, 2nd Marines =

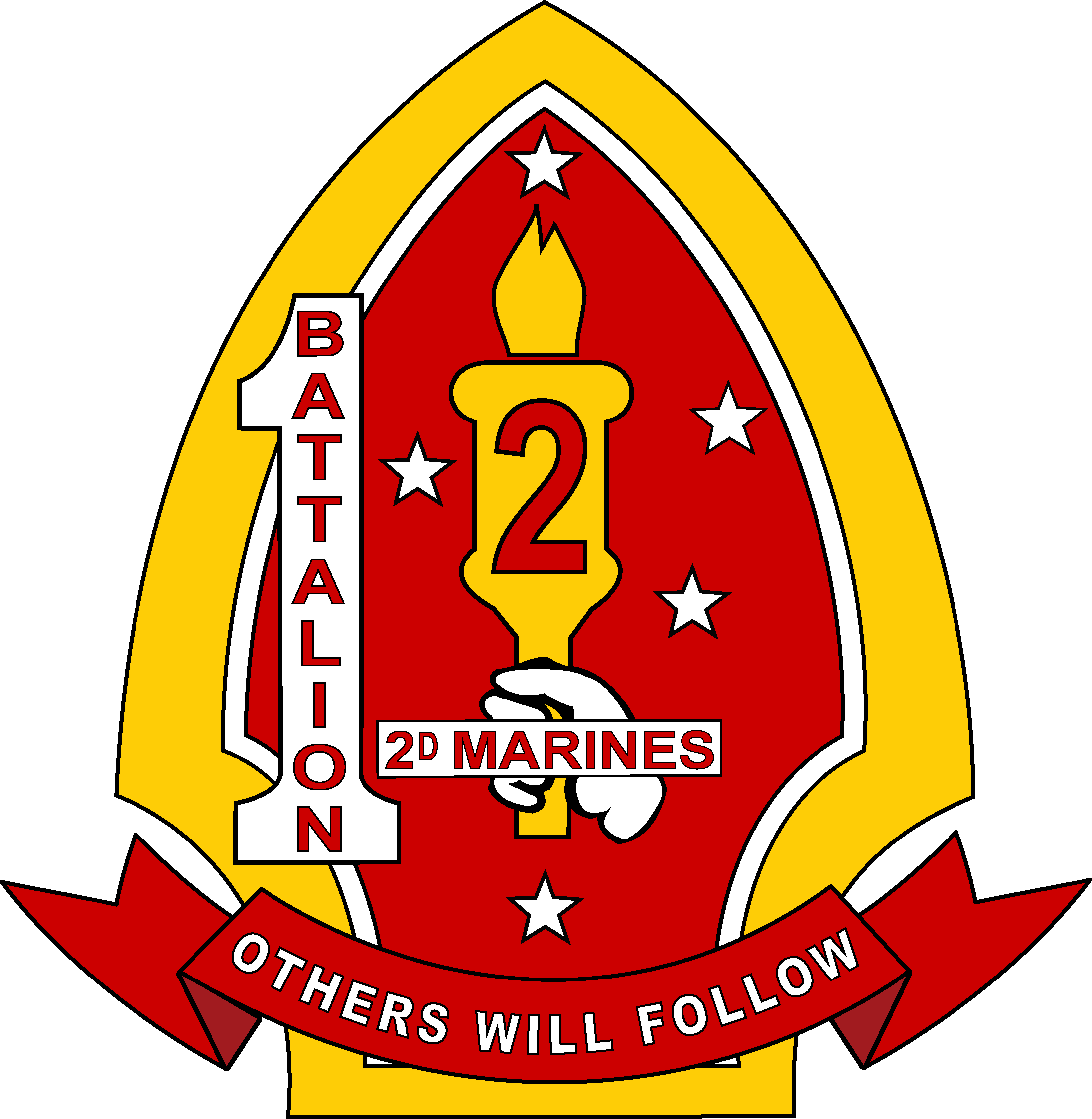
- 1st Battalion, 2nd Marines insignia
- Active: June 1, 1933 – November 1947; October 1949 – present
- Country: United States of America
- Branch: United States Marine Corps
- Type: Infantry
- Role: Offense/Defense/Sustainment, Amphibious Operations
- Part of: 2nd Marine Regiment; 2nd Marine Division
- Garrison/HQ: Marine Corps Base Camp Lejeune
- Motto: "Others will follow"
- Engagements: World War II: Battle of Guadalcanal; Battle of Tarawa; Battle of Saipan; Battle of Tinian; Battle of Okinawa; Operation Desert Storm; War on terror: Operation Iraqi Freedom; Operation Enduring Freedom

Commanders
- Current commander: Lt Col Andrew Manaois
- Notable commanders: Wood B. Kyle

1st Battalion, 2nd Marines (1/2) (pronounced "one-two") is an infantry battalion in the United States Marine Corps based out of Marine Corps Base Camp Lejeune, North Carolina, consisting of approximately 900 Marines and sailors. The battalion, callsign "Typhoon'" falls under the command of the 2nd Marine Regiment and the 2nd Marine Division.

== Subordinate units ==
- Headquarters and Service (H&S) "Hacksaw" Company
- Alpha “Animal” Company
- Bravo “Blackbeard” Company
- Charlie “Palehorse” Company
- Fires and Reconnaissance "Rogue" Company

== History ==
=== Early years ===
1/2 was activated on January 1, 1933, at Camp Haitien, Haiti and spent the next year and a half in Haiti until its deactivation in 1934.

=== World War II ===
1/2 was reactivated in June 1942 deployed to the Pacific theater of World War II. While there, the unit participated in the bloody "island hopping" campaign, fighting at Guadalcanal, Tarawa, Saipan, Tinian, and Okinawa. After the war, 1/2 spent a brief period on occupation duty in Japan, including Nagasaki, before returning to Camp Lejeune where it stood down in November 1947.

=== 1950s–1990s ===
Reactivated again in October 1949, the battalion has since regularly deployed to the Caribbean and Mediterranean regions. 1/2 has seen operational service during the Cuban Missile Crisis (1962), Dominican intervention (1965), operations in the Persian Gulf (1988), Eastern Exit (Somalia evacuation, 1991), Desert Shield and Desert Storm (1990–91), Haitian refugee (1992), Somalia (1993), and Cuba (1994), Operation Noble Obelisk-Freetown, Sierra Leone (1997). The unit has also deployed with the Unit Deployment Program and Camp Lejeune–based MEUs.

=== Global war on terror ===
In December 2001, the Marines of Bravo Company were recalled off of Christmas leave after completing their six-month Unit Deployment Program (UDP) to Okinawa. The Marines were sent to Guantanamo Bay Naval Base, Cuba to provide security for the Guantanamo Bay detention camp, including Camp X-Ray.

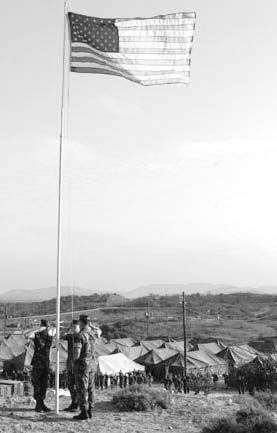
Marine CPL's David J. Docimo, Austin Quehl and Dustin Bray with Bravo Company 1/2, raise the US Flag for the 1st time over "Freedom Heights" Camp X-Ray Cuba 2002

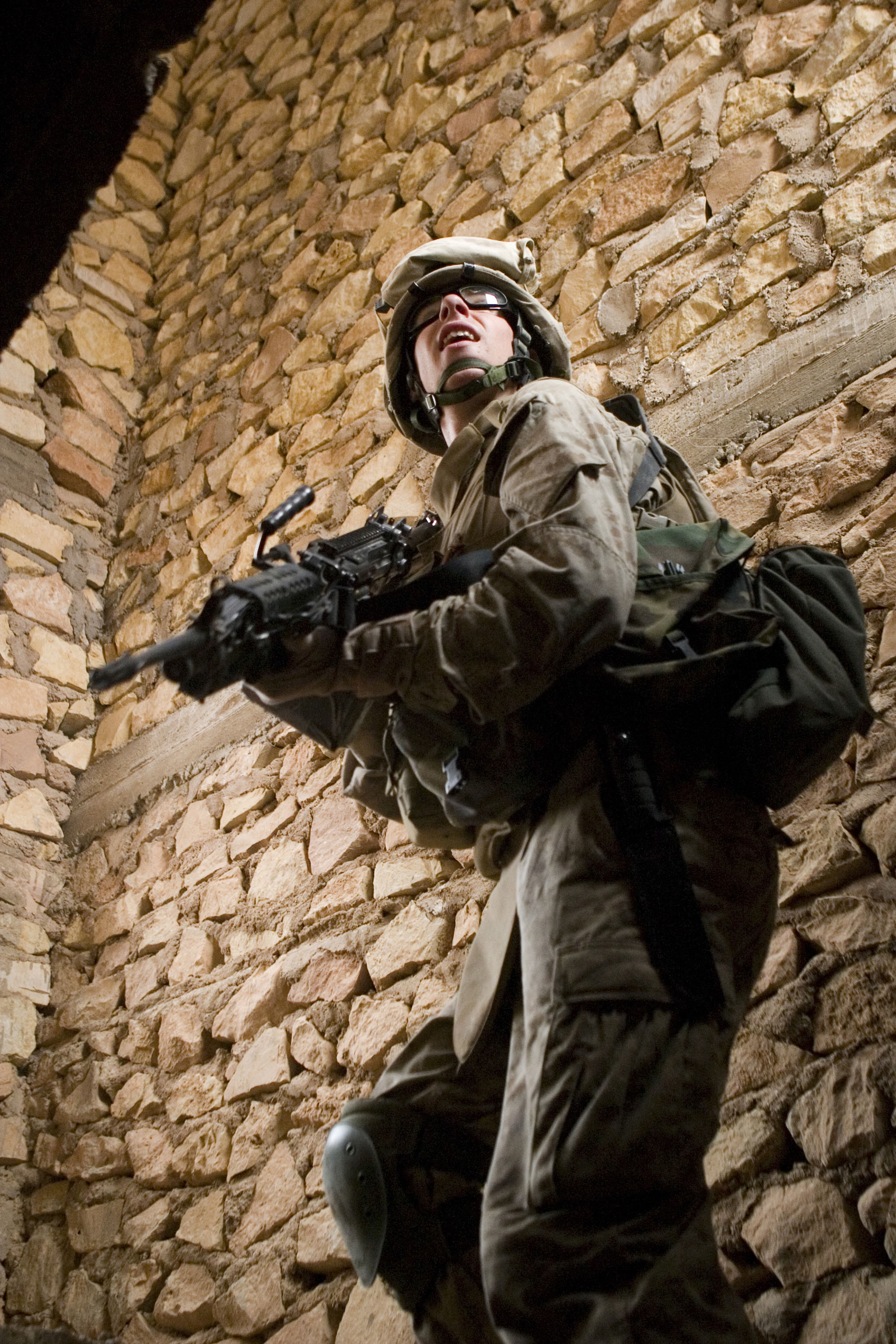
A Marine from 1st Battalion clears a building in Iraq

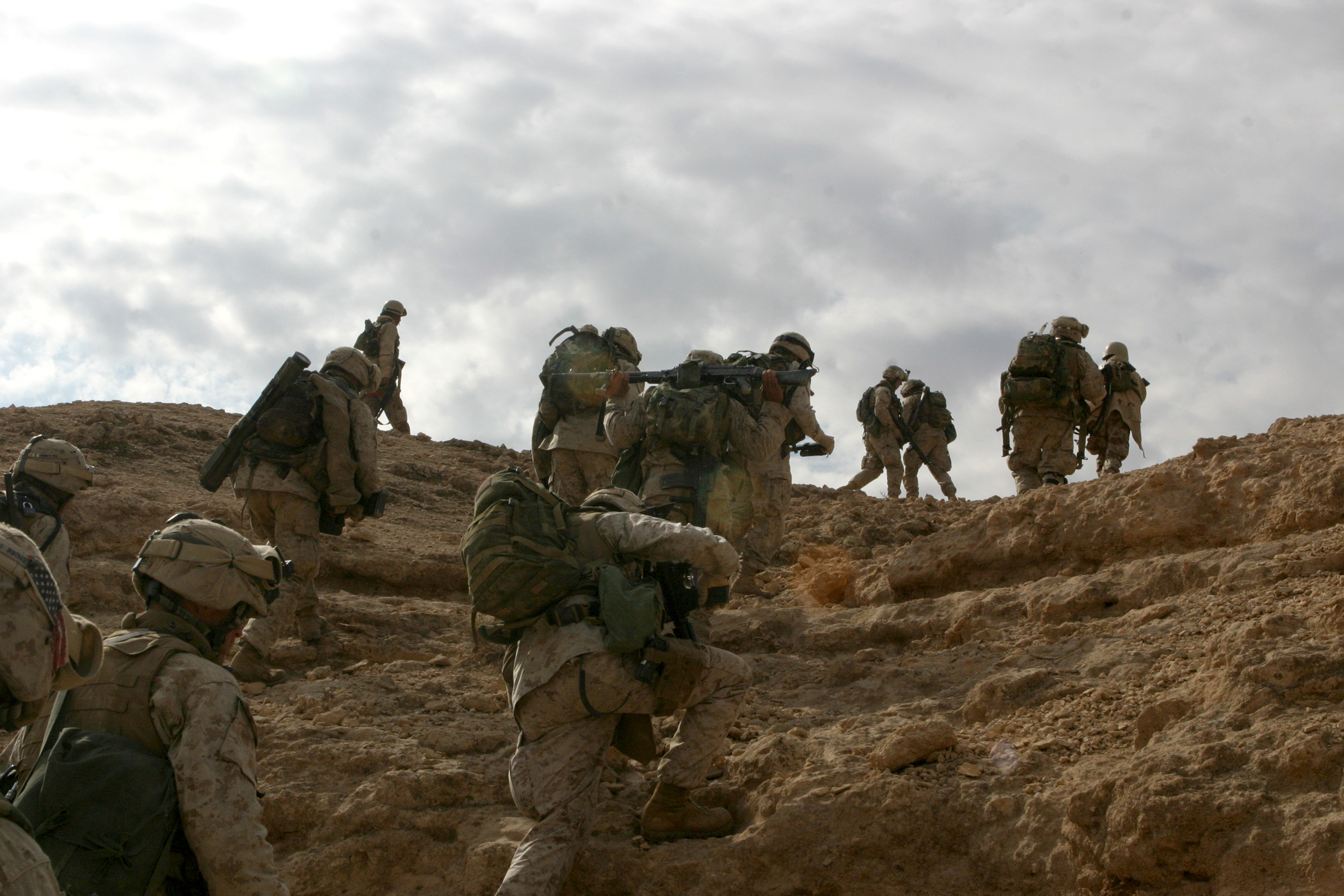
Marines climb a rocky outcrop along the Euphrates River during Operation Koa Canyon in 2006

==== Operation Iraqi Freedom ====
The battalion saw combat during Operation Iraqi Freedom as part of Task Force Tarawa in 2003 and with the 24th Marine Expeditionary Unit in 2004, having combat operations in Iskandariyah, Musayyib, Haswa, and Jurf Al Sakhar, located in the Babil province. In the summer of 2006, the battalion completed their third tour in Iraq having combat operations as part of the 22nd Marine Expeditionary Unit in Hīt located within the Al Anbar province. In March 2007 the battalion on its 4th combat deployment operated in Kahn ar Bagdadi, Ar Rutbah, Albu Hyatt and Anah, located in Al Anbar province. From July 2008 through February 2009 the battalion deployed to Al Habbaniyah in the Al Anbar province. The battalion also spent a portion of its 5th deployment to Iraq in Sinjar, located in the Nineveh province.

==== Operation Enduring Freedom ====
The battalion deployed to Afghanistan in support of Operation Enduring Freedom in March 2010. Their area of operations (AO) included Now Zad, Salaam Bazaar, Karamanda, Kunjak, Musa Qala, and the Musa Qala Wadi down to Sangin. The battalion took heavy casualties but was able to push out a large portion of the Taliban in the AO and double the size of the AO that they were responsible for. For their exceptional actions, First Battalion Second Marines, along with several attachments were awarded the Navy and Marine Corps Presidential Unit Citation. 1/2 came home in late September 2010 when they were relieved by 1st Battalion 8th Marines.

1/2 deployed again in support of OEF in 2014. Charlie Company manned Patrol Base Boldak and conducted operations in Boldak, Habibibad, Showal, and Mataque, denying the Taliban the ability to conduct attacks on Camp Bastion-Leatherneck during retrograde operations. Bravo company patrolled the surrounding area of the Bastion-Leatherneck complex. Operations conducted in the Central Wadi and Nad-I-Ali were conducted to push back the Talibans ability to conduct attacks on coalition forces until full security responsibility of the area was transferred to the Afghan National Security Forces in October 2014. 1/2 was the last U.S. ground combat unit on Camp Leatherneck, flying out on helicopters hours after control of the base was transferred to ANSF. 10 days after 1/2 turned over security to ANSF the Taliban conducted an attack on the Bastion-Leatherneck Complex

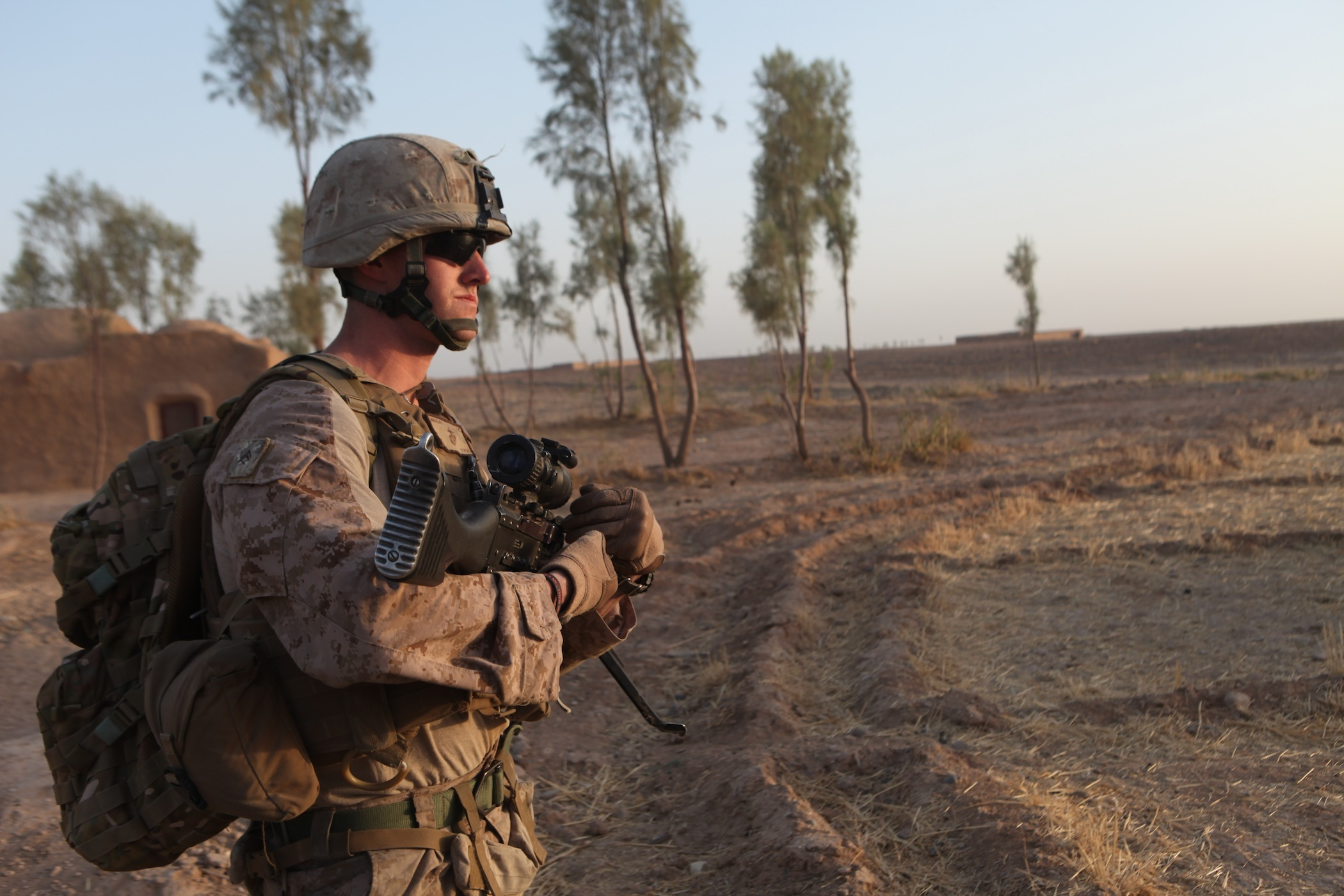
Marines and Sailors with Bravo Company, 1st Bn, 2nd Marines, conduct a security patrol near Camp Leatherneck in Helmand province, Afghanistan, August 23, 2014.

== Notable Former Members ==
- Major General Wood B. Kyle, Executive officer and later battalion commander at Guadalcanal, Tarawa, Saipan and Tinian; received two Silver Stars for that service
- Colonel John W. Ripley, battalion commander from 1979-1981, and the only Marine to be inducted into the US Army Ranger Hall of Fame
- Sergeant Major Justin D. LeHew, recipient of the Navy Cross for action during the Battle of Nasiriyah in 2003, and the Bronze Star for heroic actions during the Battle of Najaf in 2004
- Alfred M. Gray, 29th Commandant of the Marine Corps

== See also ==
- List of United States Marine Corps battalions
- Organization of the United States Marine Corps
