= Donn J. Robertson =

U.S. Marine Corps general (1916–2000)

Donn John Robertson
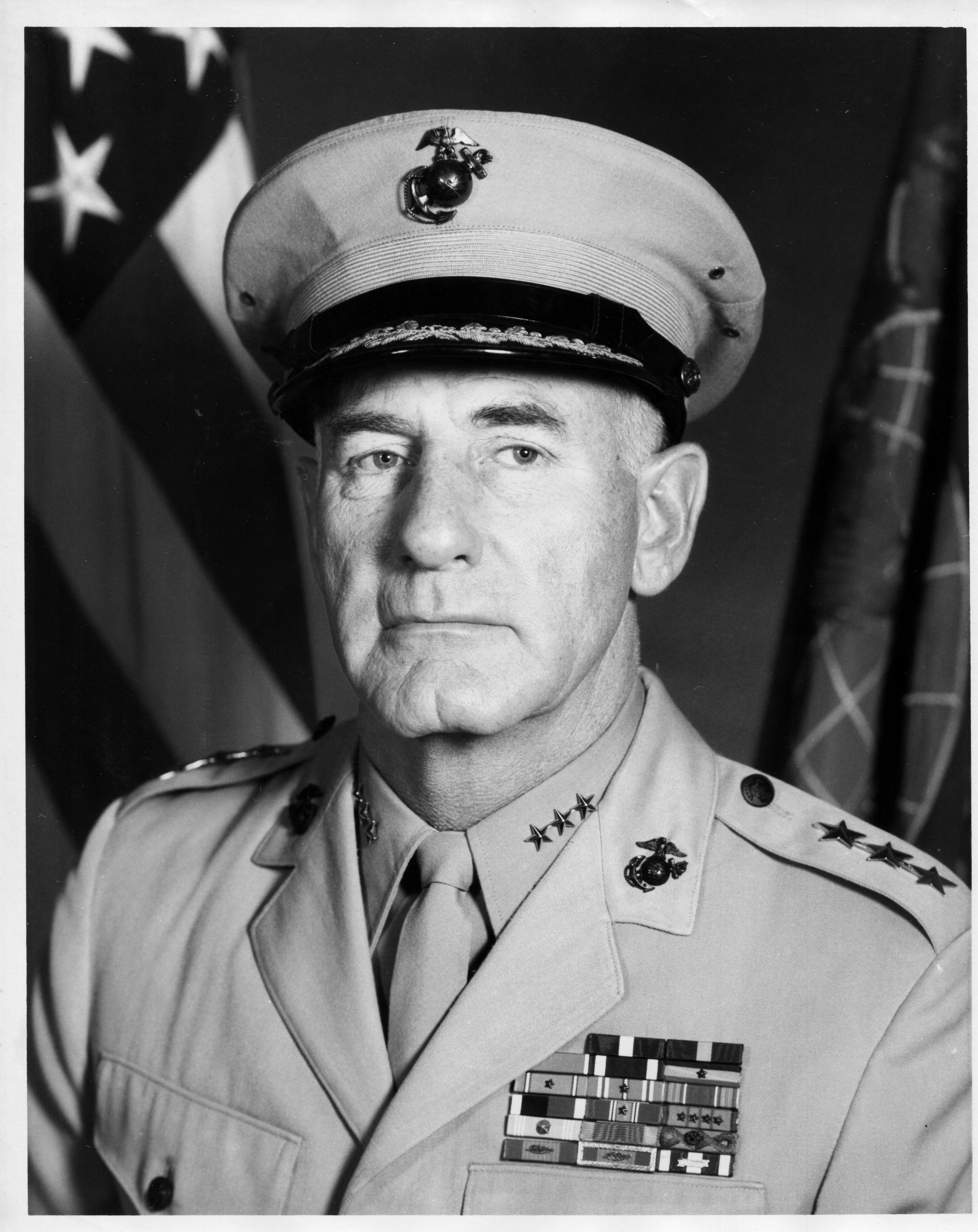
- LTG Donn J. Robertson, USMC
- Born: September 9, 1916; Willow City, North Dakota, U.S.
- Died: March 4, 2000 (aged 83); Falls Church, Virginia, U.S.
- Burial place: Arlington National Cemetery
- Military career
- Allegiance: United States of America
- Branch: United States Marine Corps
- Service years: 1938–1972
- Rank: Lieutenant general
- Service number: 0-5839
- Commands: III Marine Amphibious Force; Marine Corps Reserve; 1st Marine Division; 4th Marine Division; 5th Marine Division; Camp Pendleton
- Conflicts: World War II; Defense of Samoa; Battle of Iwo Jima; Vietnam War; Operation Union II; Operation Swift; Tet Offensive; Operation Allen Brook; Operation Mameluke Thrust
- Awards: Navy Cross; Distinguished Service Medal (2); Legion of Merit

Donn John Robertson (September 9, 1916 – March 4, 2000) was an officer of the United States Marine Corps with the rank of lieutenant general. He is most noted for his service as commanding general of III Marine Amphibious Force and 1st Marine Division during Vietnam War.

== Early career and World War II ==
Donn J. Robertson was born on September 9, 1916, in Willow City, North Dakota, however his family soon moved to Minot, North Dakota, where young Donn graduated local high school in 1934. He subsequently attended University of North Dakota, where he earned a Bachelor of Science degree in summer 1938. During his university years, Robertson captained the basketball team in his senior year and also was commissioned in the Army Reserve. He also met his future wife, Elaine Sophia, and they married on July 29, 1940. Robertson resigned his reserve commission in order to accept appointment of second lieutenant in the Marine Corps on June 1, 1938.

As a newly commissioned officer, Robertson was sent to the Basic School at Philadelphia Navy Yard for officer training, which he completed in June 1939. Additionally, many of his classmates became general officers or had very distinguished careers later: Gregory Boyington, Hugh M. Elwood, Lowell E. English, Carl J. Fleps, Edward H. Hurst, Charles J. Quilter and Alvin S. Sanders.

He was subsequently assigned to the Marine detachment aboard the battleship USS West Virginia and spent most of his time there with patrol cruises in Pacific and Hawaii and also took part in Fleet Problem XXI during 1940.

Robertson was transferred to San Diego, California, where he was appointed company commander within 2nd Marine Division under Major General Clayton B. Vogel. He was promoted to the rank of first lieutenant in August 1941 and later served as Division adjutant under the new division's commander, Major General Charles F. B. Price. Following the Japanese Attack on Pearl Harbor and United States' entry into World War II, General Price was ordered to the Pacific Area at the end of March 1942, to be appointed commanding general of the newly established Samoan Defense Force and aware of Robertson's administration skills, he requested him as his adjutant. Meanwhile, Robertson was promoted to the rank of captain in February 1942.

During his assignment in Samoa, he was promoted to the rank of major in March 1943 and subsequently returned to the United States in March 1944 in order to attend Command and Staff Course at Marine Corps Schools Quantico, Virginia. Robertson graduated in June 1944 and subsequently was transferred to the 5th Marine Division under Major General Keller E. Rockey.

He sailed back to the Pacific theater in September 1944 and was appointed commanding officer of 3rd Battalion, 27th Marine Regiment under Colonel Thomas A. Wornham. Robertson was also promoted to the rank of lieutenant colonel in October 1944. During the Battle of Iwo Jima in February 1945, Robertson led his battalion up to the heavily fortified Hill 362, but his unit was pinned down by intense hostile mortar and machine-gun fire. He left his command post and moved to the forward observation post to personally observe the situation. Robertson then moved along the front line units, inspired his men to heroic effort in resuming the attack until they had advanced up the southern slopes and seized the crest of this vitally strategic hill. His battalion took heavy casualties, but he refused withdrawal of his unit and repulsed several night attacks and prevented the Japanese to penetrate the regimental line.

For his gallantry in action and excellent leadership, Robertson was decorated with the Navy Cross, the United States military's second-highest decoration awarded for valor in combat. He also received the Navy Presidential Unit Citation.

== Postwar service ==
Following the Surrender of Japan in August 1945, Robertson was appointed executive officer of 27th Marine Regiment under Colonel Thomas A. Wornham and took part in occupation duties in Japan. He was stationed in Ōmura until December 1945, when he was attached to the 8th Service Regiment at Sasebo as a regimental executive officer.

Robertson returned stateside in May 1946 and assumed command of Marine Barracks at Marine Corps Air Station at San Diego. This service lasted until November of that year, when he was transferred to the staff of 3rd Marine Brigade at Camp Pendleton under Brigadier General John T. Walker. This unit was used as administrative command for combat veterans returning from occupation duties in Japan and Robertson was responsible for personnel matters as assistant chief of staff for manpower and personnel.

When the 3rd Brigade was absorbed by 1st Marine Division in July 1947, Robertson was appointed to the same capacity under Major General Graves B. Erskine. He remained in that assignment until March 1948, when he was transferred to the Headquarters Marine Corps in Washington, D.C., and appointed officer in charge of Enlisted Detail Branch.

During June 1951, Robertson was ordered to Cuba and assigned to the Marine barracks within Guantanamo Bay Naval Base. He served first as an executive officer and following his promotion to the rank of colonel in January 1954, he was appointed barracks commanding officer.

After two years in the Caribbean, Robertson returned stateside for the Senior Course at the Marine Corps Schools Quantico in June 1953. He graduated during the following June and remained at Quantico Base until October 1954.

Robertson subsequently left for Korea, but too late to see combat. He was assigned to the staff of 1st Marine Division under Major General Robert E. Hogaboom as senior advisor to the Korean Marine Corps. For his service in this capacity, Colonel Robertson received the Korean Order of National Security Merit, 2nd Class with Silver Star.

Following his return to the United States in September 1955, Robertson was appointed officer in charge of the Plans Branch within Division of Operations at Headquarters Marine Corps. This assignment lasted until June 1958, when he was transferred to Hawaii and appointed assistant chief of staff for operations at the headquarters of Fleet Marine Force Pacific under his old superior from Iwo Jima, now Lieutenant General Thomas A. Wornham.

When General Wornham retired early in 1961, Colonel Robertson did not have to wait long and also received orders for transfer, now to the National War College. He was appointed a student in the senior course and graduated in June 1961. Robertson then served as Chief of Staff of Marine Corps Schools at Quantico and remained in this capacity until August 30, 1963, when he was promoted the rank of brigadier general.

With the rank of brigadier general, Robertson was appointed commanding general of Force Troops, Fleet Marine Force Atlantic (FMFLANT) with headquarters at Camp Lejeune, North Carolina. In this capacity, he was responsible for all independent units under FMFLANT such as support artillery units, antiaircraft artillery units, military police battalions, separate engineer units and other miscellaneous force units.

== Vietnam War ==
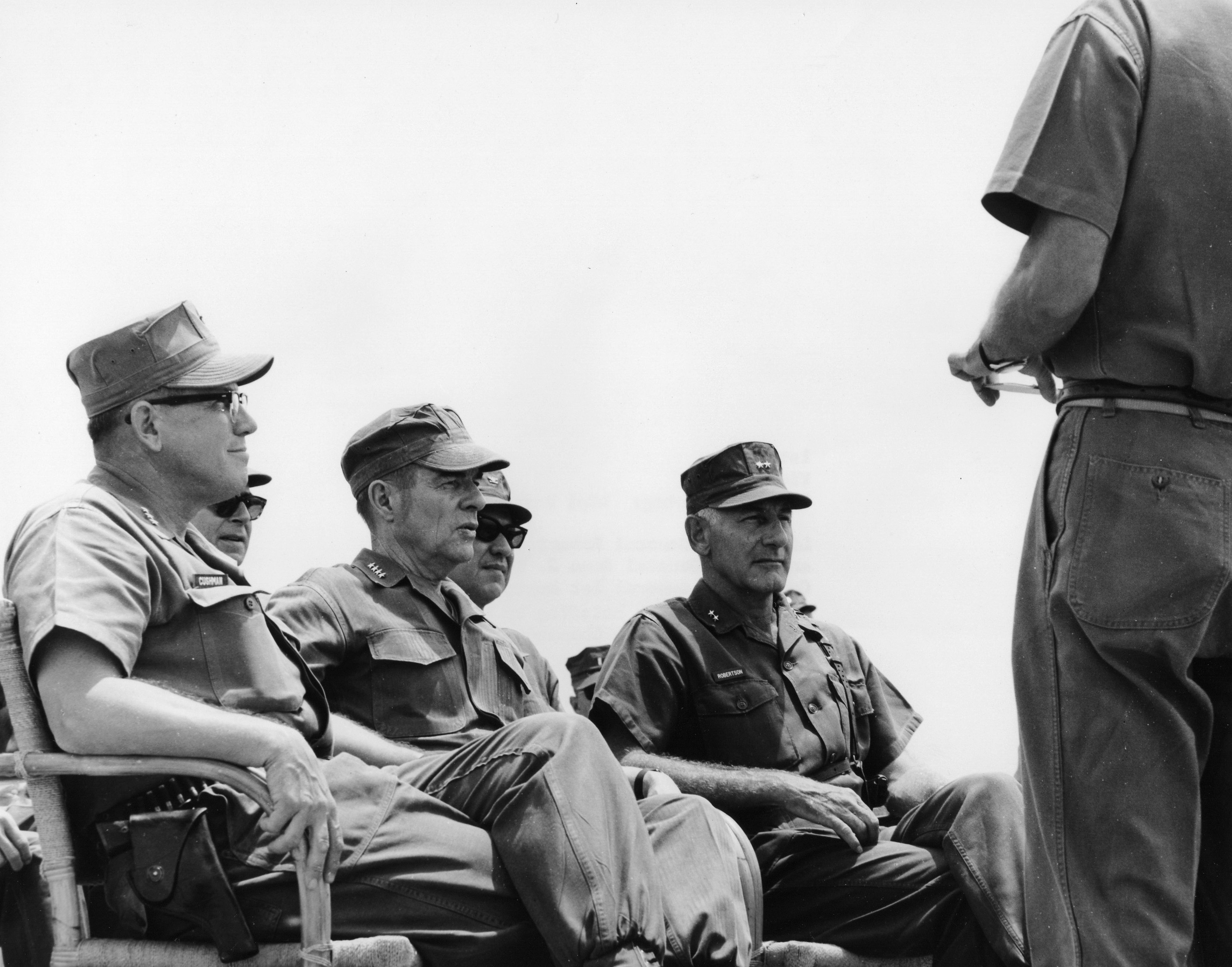
LTG Robert E. Cushman, Jr. (CG III MAC), GEN Wallace M. Greene (CMC) and MG Donn J. Robertson, (CG 1st Marine Division) listening to map briefing by LTC John D. Counselman, Commanding Officer 3rd Battalion, 7th Marines, Da Nang 1967

During September 1965, Robertson was transferred to the Headquarters Marine Corps in Washington, D.C., and appointed Deputy Fiscal Director of the Marine Corps under James F. Wright. While at Marine Corps Headquarters, he was promoted to the rank of major general on May 5, 1967. He also received the Navy Commendation Medal for his service in that capacity.

Robertson left for South Vietnam and assumed command of 1st Marine Division with headquarters located at Chu Lai Base Area at the beginning of June 1967. He led his division during the fighting in Quế Sơn Valley at the end of Operation Union II, a search and destroy mission. During the beginning of August, Robertson launched Operation Cochise with the objective of destroying People's Army of Vietnam (PAVN) 2nd Division Headquarters and logistics base in the vicinity of Quế Sơn Valley. However PAVN and Vietcong forces were able to avoid contact with Marine forces where the ultimate outcome of the operation was modest im comparison with expectations.

At the beginning of September 1967, Robertson planned the Operation Swift in response to the increasing PAVN and Vietcong activity in the Quế Sơn Valley during the upcoming South Vietnamese elections. There were reports of the presence of elements of the PAVN 2nd Division in the area and Robertson was afraid of the violation of the election process. His fears were confirmed when the several companies from 1st Battalion, 5th Marines was ambushed by the enemy in the vicinity of Dong Son village. They were soon afterwards encircled and Robertson ordered its rescue. The operation was successful with over 600 PAVN and Vietcong killed and only 127 on the U.S. side.

When PAVN/Vietcong forces launched Tet Offensive at the end of January 1968, Robertson's division took part in fierce fighting. Elements of the division under his command played a significant role in the Battle of Huế.

Still under his command, 1st Marine Division took part in the Operation Allen Brook at the beginning of May 1968 in order to drive out the PAVN/Vietcong from Go Noi Island, located approximately 25 km south of Da Nang. However, after one year in Vietnam, Robertson was relieved by Major General Carl A. Youngdale on June 26, 1968, and returned to the United States under rotation policy.

For his service in Vietnam with 1st Marine Division, Robertson was decorated with the Navy Distinguished Service Medal and several decorations by the Government of Republic of Vietnam.

== Later service and second tour in Vietnam ==
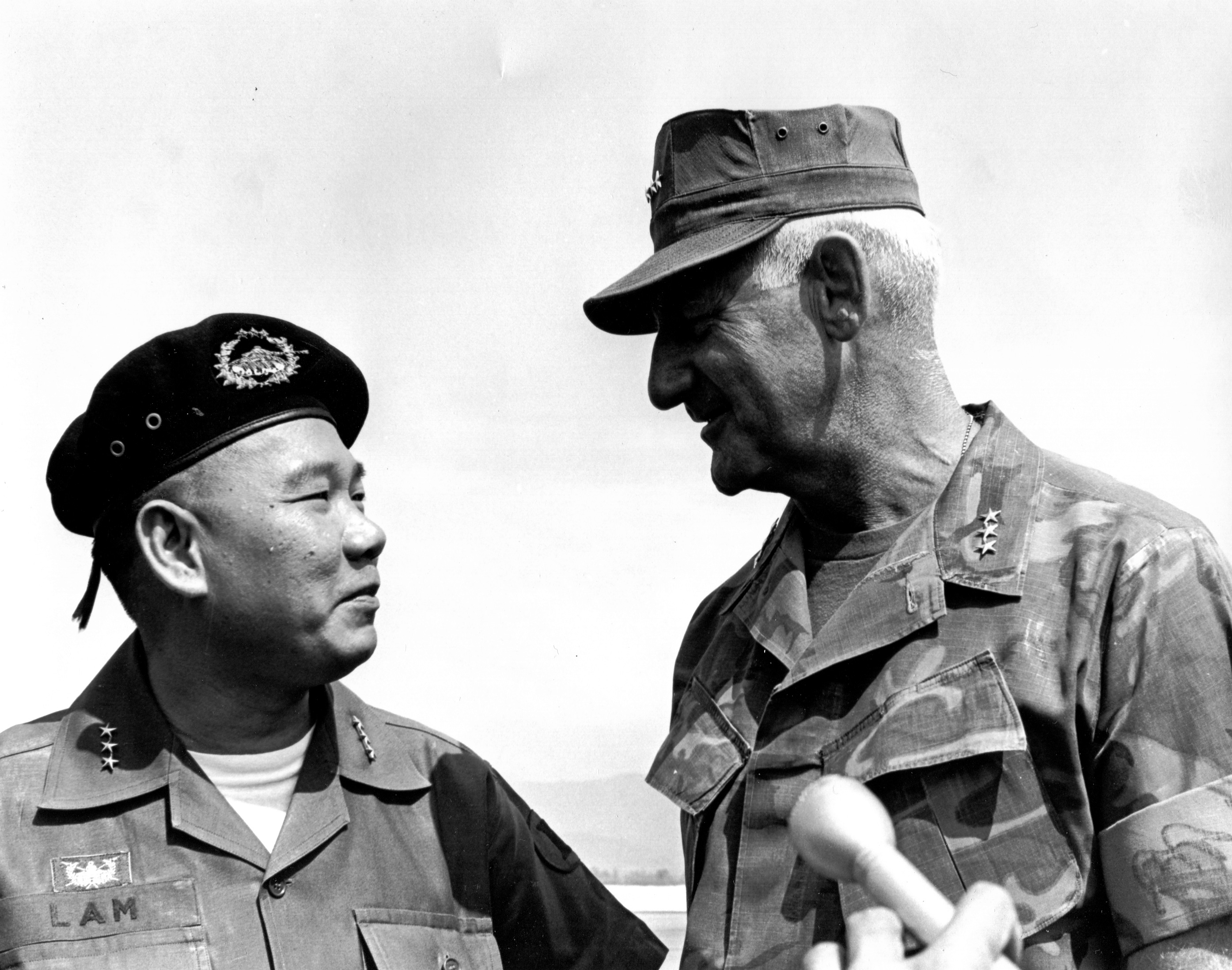
LTG Hoang Xuan Lam, CG of MR1 and LTG Donn J. Robertson, CG of III MAF bid each other farewell as LTG Robertson prepares to transfer III MAF to Okinawa from Vietnam, April 14, 1971.

Following his return stateside, he was appointed commanding general of Camp Pendleton at San Diego. He was also given additional duty as commanding general of the nucleus of 4th Marine Division as main force of the Marine Corps Reserve. In this capacity, he was responsible for the training of all marine reserve ground units. In May 1969, he assumed command of 5th Marine Division, another component of Marine Corps Reserve and Robertson held three commands at the same time. For his service in this capacity, he was decorated with the Legion of Merit.

Due to his experiences with the training of Marine Reserve Units, Robertson was transferred to Washington, D.C., and appointed director of Marine Corps Reserve at Headquarters Marine Corps in September 1970.

In December 1970, Robertson was promoted to the rank of lieutenant general on December 24, 1970, and ordered back to Vietnam as commanding general of III Marine Amphibious Force. In this capacity, he relieved Lieutenant General Keith B. McCutcheon, who struggled with cancer. Robertson assumed command of III Marine Amphibious Force on January 1, 1970, in Da Nang area, which he know well from his previous assignment with 1st Marine Division in 1967–1968. The units of his corps provided air support for Operation Lam Son 719 during February and March 1971.

However, the U.S. Government decided on reducing of Marine troops in Vietnam, and General Robertson was tasked with the redeployment of III Marine Amphibious Force to Okinawa, Japan. He left Vietnam on April 14, 1971, and spent next eight months in Japan, before he was ordered back to the United States in January 1972. Robertson was subsequently attached to the Headquarters Marine Corps, where he awaited retirement, which was granted on April 30, 1972.

Robertson retired from active duty after 34 years of commissioned service, and, during his retirement ceremony, he was decorated with a second Navy Distinguished Service Medal for his second tour of duty in Vietnam.

Following his retirement from the Marine Corps, Robertson resided in Falls Church, Virginia, and served as president of Navy-Marine Corps Relief Society and later as chairman of Marine Corps Historical Foundation.

Robertson died on March 4, 2000, and is buried together with his wife Elaine Sophia Robertson (1916–2016) at Arlington National Cemetery. They had together three sons: Donn John Jr., Tom and David Lean and one daughter Tamara.

== Decorations ==
Robertson was decorated with the Navy Cross for his heroism during the Battle of Iwo Jima from February 19 to March 23, 1945. He was then a lieutenant colonel serving as commanding officer of 3rd Battalion, 27th Marine Regiment, 5th Marine Division. His citation states in part:

"When his battalion was pinned down by intense hostile mortar, machine-gun and grenade fire during a sustained drive to seize heavily fortified Hill 362, on 28 February, Lieutenant Colonel Robertson voluntarily left his position in the forward observation post and, moving along the front line units, inspired his men to heroic effort in resuming the attack until they had advanced up the southern slopes and seized the crest of this vitally strategic hill. With the battalion badly depleted by casualties, only a skeleton platoon left as a reserve, and all regular company commanders and many platoon leaders dead, he rallied his tired, depleted units and directed them to dig in for the night before the enemy, in a desperate attempt to split the regimental front, launched a strong counterattack against the left flank of the battalion. Refusing to permit a complete withdrawal, he dashed fearlessly through heavy machine-gun and mortar fire to the imperiled position and ordered an immediate attack which repulsed the Japanese and regained fifty yards of lost terrain. Then, reorganizing his defenses by consolidating the left of his line with the battalion on his left, he remained throughout the night at the front lines, encouraging his exhausted men to hold fast despite overwhelming odds and directed them in thwarting repeated attempts by the Japanese to penetrate the regimental line."

Here is the ribbon bar of Lieutenant General Donn J. Robertson:

1st Row	Navy Cross		Navy Distinguished Service Medal with one 5/16" Gold Star	Legion of Merit
2nd Row	Navy Commendation Medal	Navy Presidential Unit Citation with two stars	Navy Unit Commendation	American Defense Service Medal with Base Clasp
3rd Row	Asiatic-Pacific Campaign Medal with one 3/16 inch service star	American Campaign Medal	World War II Victory Medal	Navy Occupation Service Medal
4th Row	National Defense Service Medal with one star	Vietnam Service Medal with five 3/16 inch service stars	Korean Order of National Security Merit, 2nd Class with Silver Star	National Order of Vietnam, 3rd Class
5th Row	Vietnam Distinguished Service Order, 1st Class	Vietnam Gallantry Cross with Palm	Vietnam Gallantry Cross Unit Citation	Vietnam Campaign Medal

Military offices
Preceded by Keith B. McCutcheon	Commanding General of the III Marine Amphibious Force; December 24, 1970 – January, 1972	Succeeded by Louis Metzger
Preceded by Leo J. Dulacki	Commanding General of the 5th Marine Division; May 1, 1969 – July 1, 1969	Succeeded by Ross T. Dwyer
Preceded by Wood B. Kyle	Commanding General of the 4th Marine Division; July 18, 1968 – July 14, 1970	Succeeded by Leo J. Dulacki
Preceded by Herman Nickerson Jr.	Commanding General of the 1st Marine Division; June 1, 1967 – June 26, 1968	Succeeded by Carl A. Youngdale
