= Willow City, North Dakota =

- City
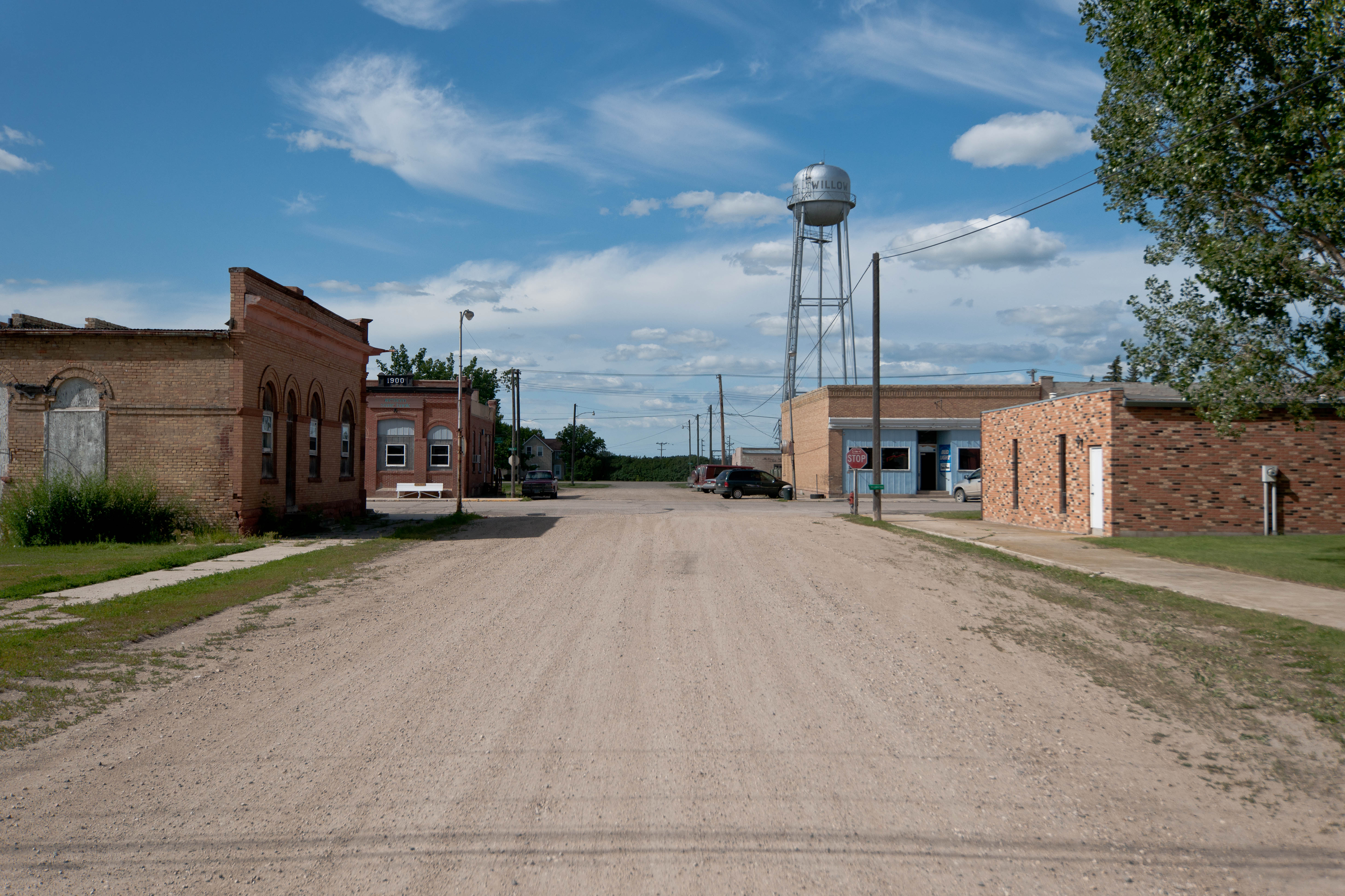
- Downtown Willow City

- Location of Willow City, North Dakota

- Location in the United States
- Coordinates: 48°36′17″N 100°17′36″W
- Country: United States
- State: North Dakota
- County: Bottineau
- Founded: 1887

Area
  - Total: 0.47 sq mi (1.21 km^{2})
  - Land: 0.47 sq mi (1.21 km^{2})
  - Water: 0 sq mi (0.00 km^{2})
- Elevation: 1,470 ft (448 m)

Population (2020)
  - Total: 149
  - Estimate (2024): 148
  - Density: 318.3/sq mi (122.88/km^{2})
- Time zone: UTC–6 (Central (CST))
  - Summer (DST): UTC–5 (CDT)
- ZIP Code: 58384
- Area code: 701
- FIPS code: 38-86380
- GNIS feature ID: 1036336

Willow City is a city in Bottineau County, North Dakota, United States. The population was 149 at the 2020 census.

== History ==
In 1886, the Great Northern Railway laid tracks through Willow City on the way to Bottineau. The community's first election took place in 1890, and the city was incorporated in 1906.

== Geography ==
According to the United States Census Bureau, the city has a total area of 0.46 square miles (1.19 km^{2}), all land.

== Demographics ==
Historical population
Census	Pop.	Note	%±
1900	476		—
1910	623		30.9%
1920	559		−10.3%
1930	577		3.2%
1940	524		−9.2%
1950	595		13.5%
1960	494		−17.0%
1970	403		−18.4%
1980	329		−18.4%
1990	281		−14.6%
2000	221		−21.4%
2010	163		−26.2%
2020	149		−8.6%
2024 (est.)	148		−0.7%
U.S. Decennial Census; 2020 Census

=== 2010 census ===
As of the 2010 census, there were 163 people, 84 households, and 47 families living in the city. The population density was 354.3 inhabitants per square mile (136.8/km^{2}). There were 123 housing units at an average density of 267.4 per square mile (103.2/km^{2}). The racial makeup of the city was 95.1% White, 0.6% African American, 2.5% Native American, and 1.8% from two or more races. Hispanic or Latino of any race were 0.6% of the population.

There were 84 households, of which 14.3% had children under the age of 18 living with them, 44.0% were married couples living together, 7.1% had a female householder with no husband present, 4.8% had a male householder with no wife present, and 44.0% were non-families. 40.5% of all households were made up of individuals, and 19.1% had someone living alone who was 65 years of age or older. The average household size was 1.94 and the average family size was 2.60.

The median age in the city was 51.2 years. 16% of residents were under the age of 18; 6.1% were between the ages of 18 and 24; 17.1% were from 25 to 44; 34.3% were from 45 to 64; and 26.4% were 65 years of age or older. The gender makeup of the city was 54.0% male and 46.0% female.

=== 2000 census ===
As of the 2000 census, there were 221 people, 100 households, and 62 families living in the city. The population density was 486.8 inhabitants per square mile (188.0/km^{2}). There were 143 housing units at an average density of 315.0 per square mile (121.6/km^{2}). The racial makeup of the city was 92.31% White, 0.00% African American, 2.26% Native American, and 4.52% from two or more races.

There were 100 households, out of which 27.0% had children under the age of 18 living with them, 54.0% were married couples living together, 4.0% had a female householder with no husband present, and 38.0% were non-families. 35.0% of all households were made up of individuals, and 18.0% had someone living alone who was 65 years of age or older. The average household size was 2.21 and the average family size was 2.90.

In the city, the population was spread out, with 23.1% under the age of 18, 5.4% from 18 to 24, 19.5% from 25 to 44, 21.7% from 45 to 64, and 30.3% who were 65 years of age or older. The median age was 46 years. For every 100 females, there were 106.5 males. For every 100 females age 18 and over, there were 102.4 males.

The median income for a household in the city was $25,313, and the median income for a family was $34,688. Males had a median income of $28,250 versus $17,500 for females. The per capita income for the city was $11,909. About 6.7% of families and 11.8% of the population were below the poverty line, including none of those under the age of eighteen and 22.5% of those 65 or over.

== Climate ==
This climatic region is typified by large seasonal temperature differences, with warm to hot (and often humid) summers and cold (sometimes severely cold) winters. According to the Köppen Climate Classification system, Willow City has a humid continental climate, abbreviated "Dfb" on climate maps.

Climate data for Willow City, North Dakota (1991–2020 normals, extremes 1893–present)
Month	Jan	Feb	Mar	Apr	May	Jun	Jul	Aug	Sep	Oct	Nov	Dec	Year
Record high °F (°C)	55 (13)	63 (17)	83 (28)	97 (36)	107 (42)	107 (42)	110 (43)	105 (41)	102 (39)	93 (34)	75 (24)	65 (18)	110 (43)
Mean daily maximum °F (°C)	15.1 (−9.4)	20.0 (−6.7)	33.1 (0.6)	51.8 (11.0)	65.7 (18.7)	74.5 (23.6)	80.0 (26.7)	80.1 (26.7)	70.1 (21.2)	53.6 (12.0)	34.9 (1.6)	20.9 (−6.2)	50.0 (10.0)
Daily mean °F (°C)	4.7 (−15.2)	8.9 (−12.8)	22.2 (−5.4)	38.7 (3.7)	51.5 (10.8)	61.7 (16.5)	66.7 (19.3)	65.2 (18.4)	55.2 (12.9)	40.9 (4.9)	24.6 (−4.1)	11.2 (−11.6)	37.6 (3.1)
Mean daily minimum °F (°C)	−5.6 (−20.9)	−2.1 (−18.9)	11.2 (−11.6)	25.5 (−3.6)	37.4 (3.0)	48.9 (9.4)	53.3 (11.8)	50.2 (10.1)	40.3 (4.6)	28.1 (−2.2)	14.3 (−9.8)	1.5 (−16.9)	25.3 (−3.7)
Record low °F (°C)	−54 (−48)	−54 (−48)	−45 (−43)	−22 (−30)	10 (−12)	22 (−6)	30 (−1)	26 (−3)	−14 (−26)	−13 (−25)	−33 (−36)	−44 (−42)	−54 (−48)
Average precipitation inches (mm)	0.46 (12)	0.50 (13)	0.77 (20)	1.11 (28)	2.61 (66)	3.82 (97)	2.81 (71)	2.43 (62)	1.69 (43)	1.32 (34)	0.79 (20)	0.64 (16)	18.95 (481)
Source: NOAA

== Notable people ==
- Dick Anderson, member of the North Dakota House of Representatives
- Donn J. Robertson, United States Marine Corps general

== Gallery ==
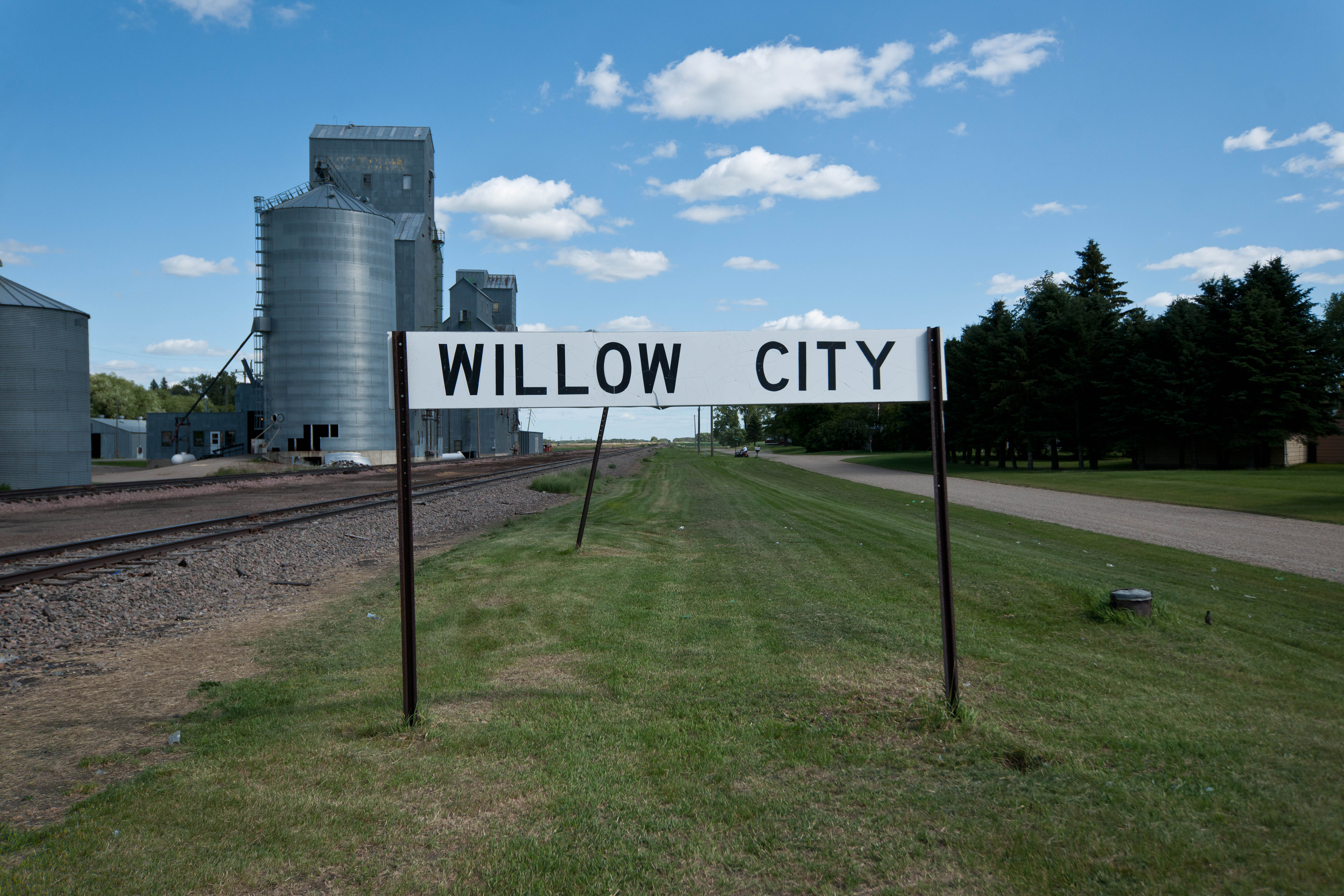

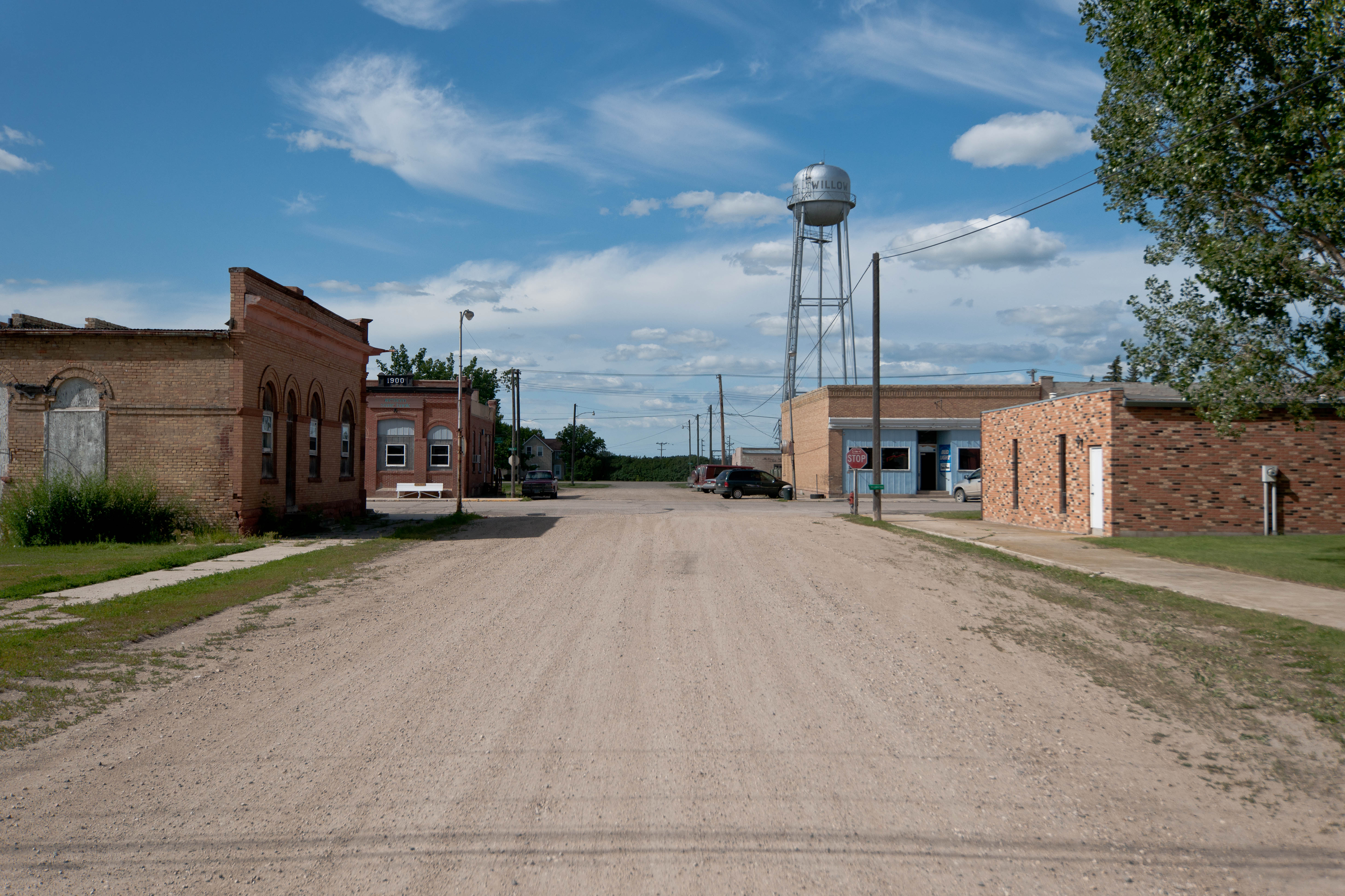

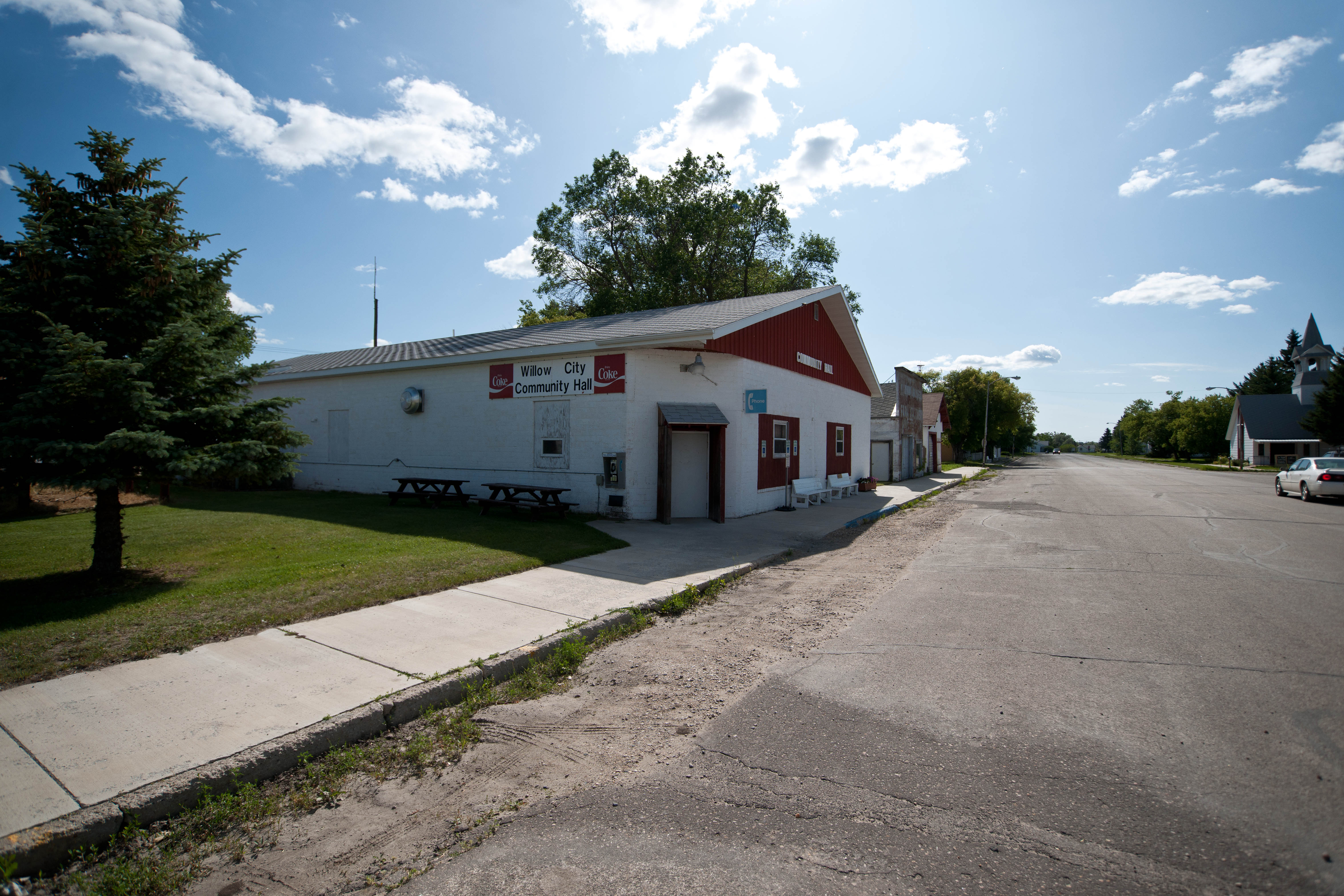
Community Hall

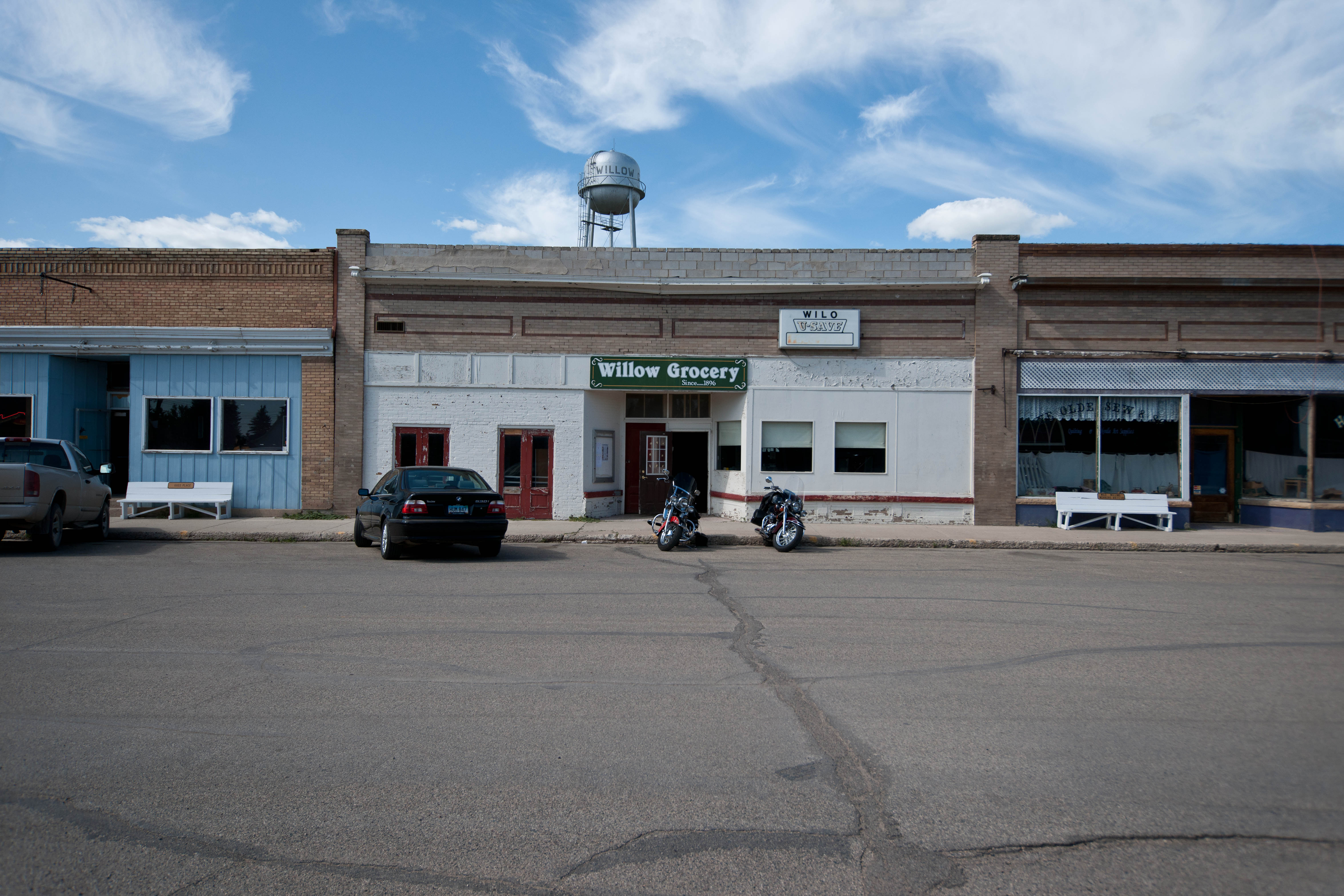

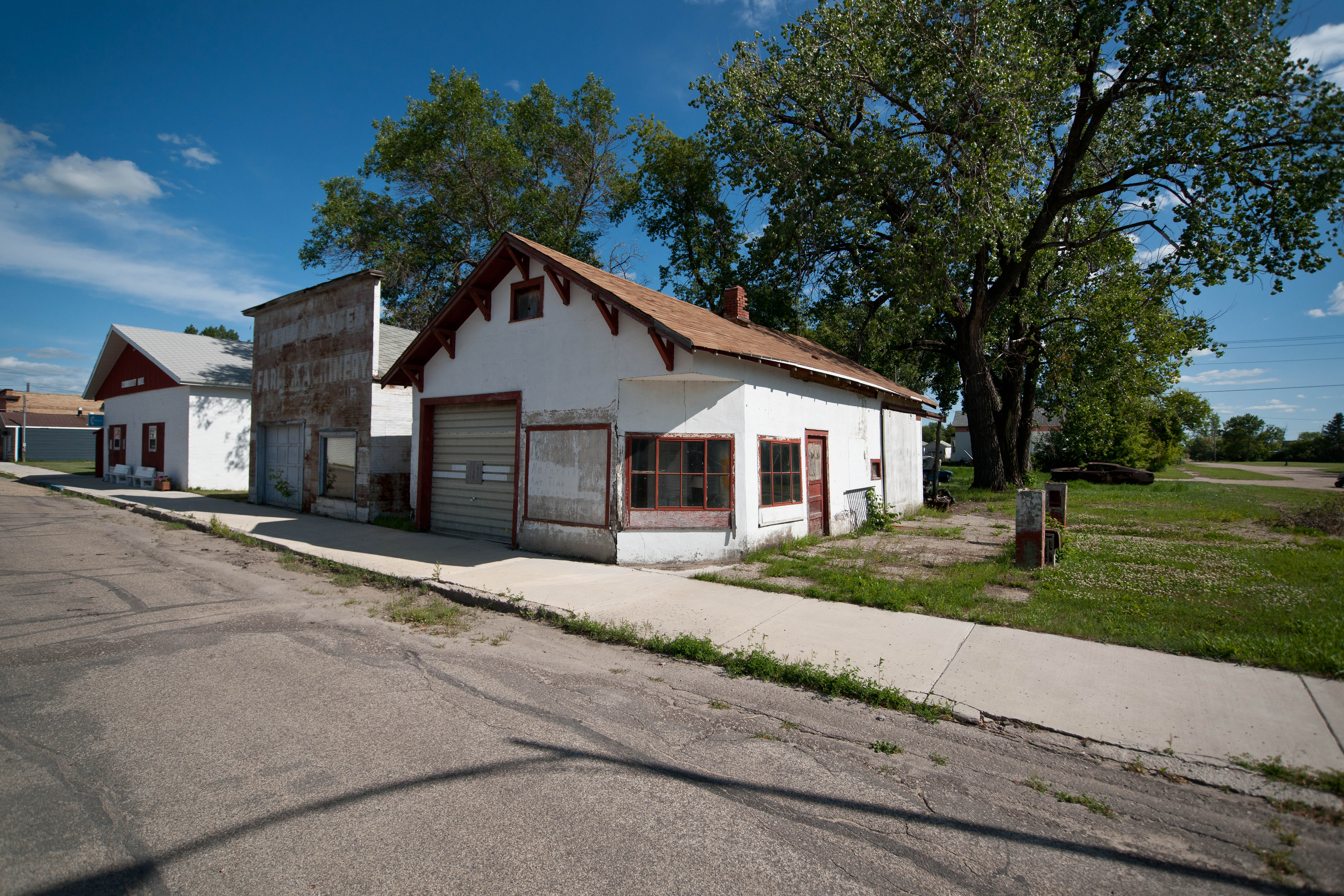

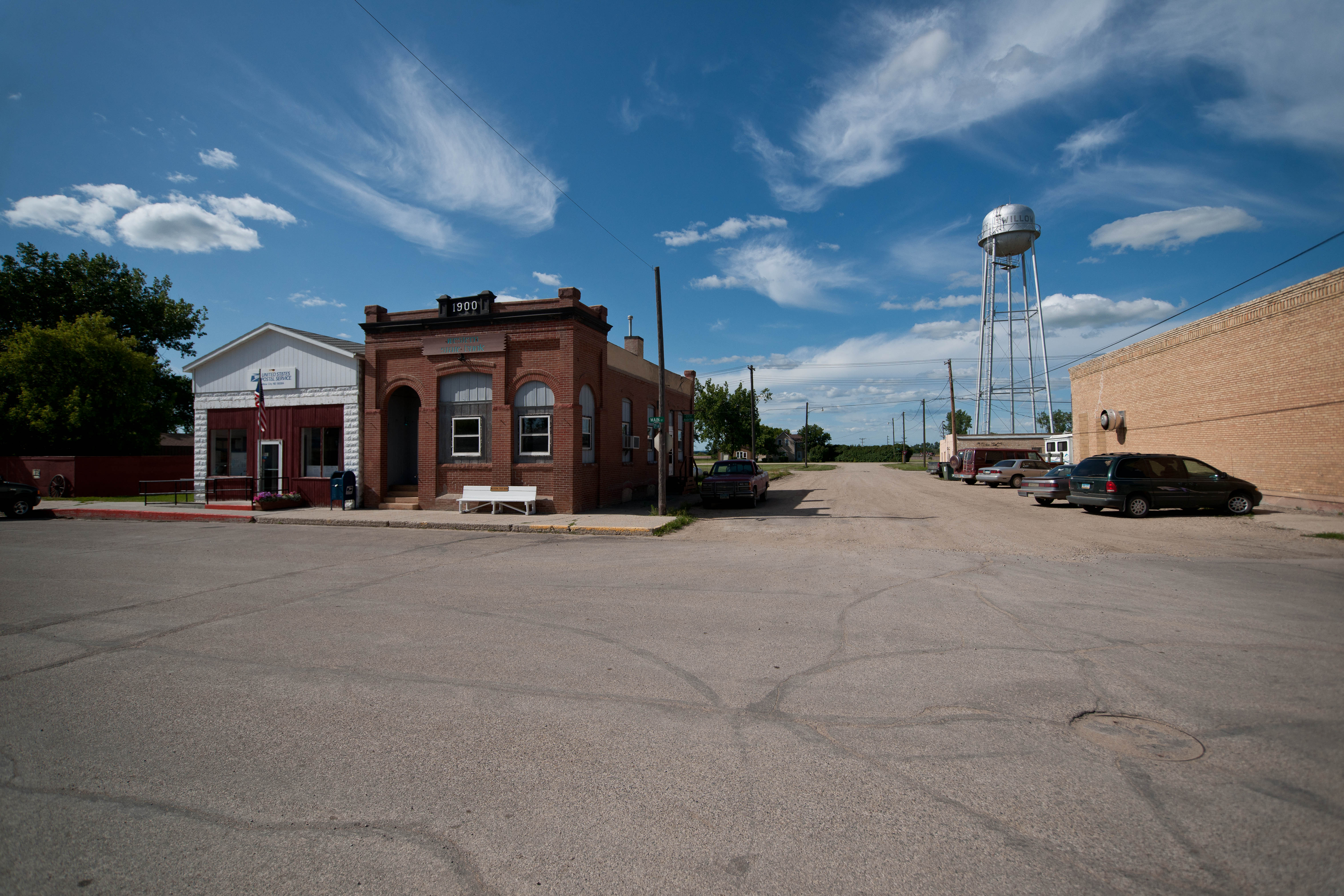

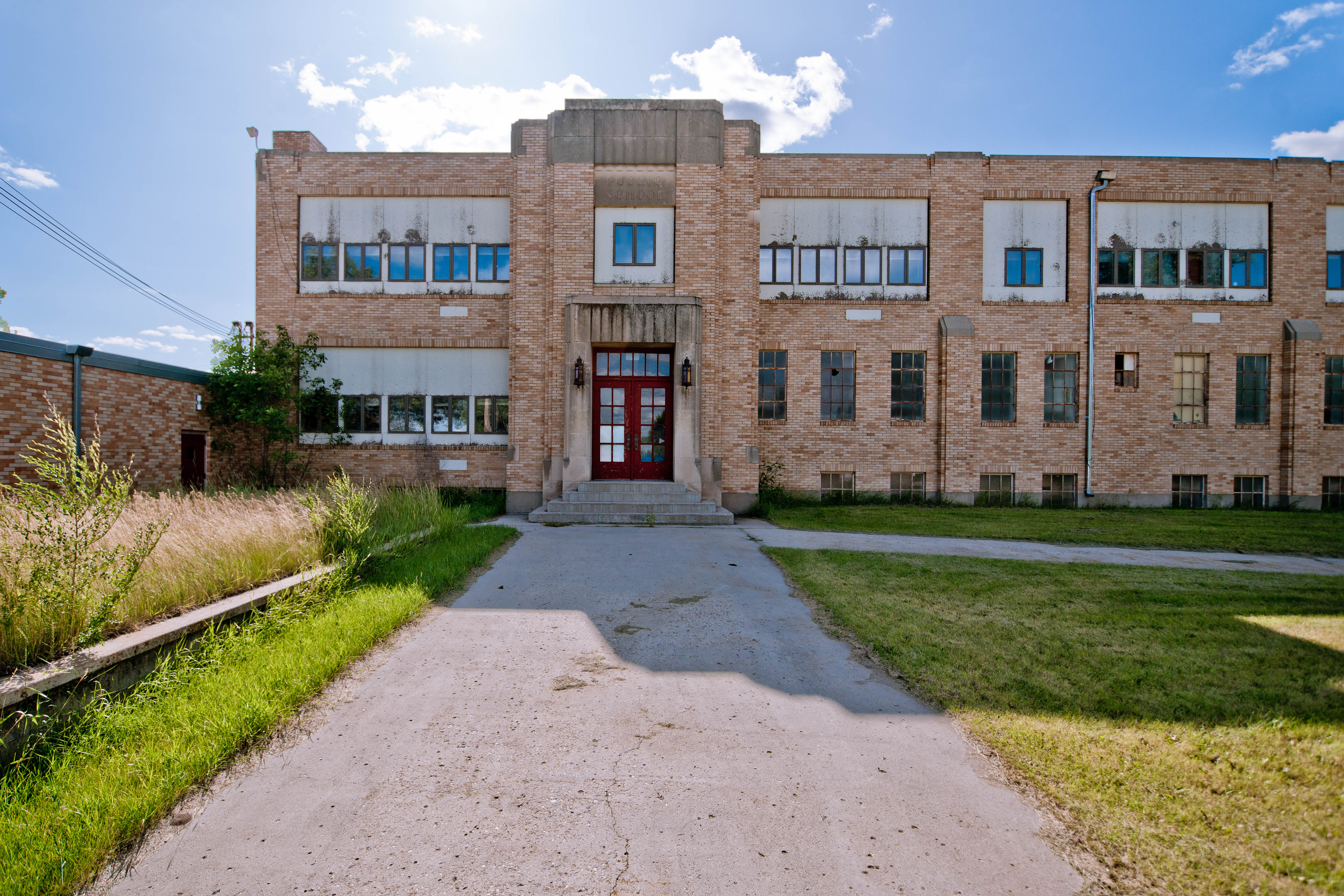

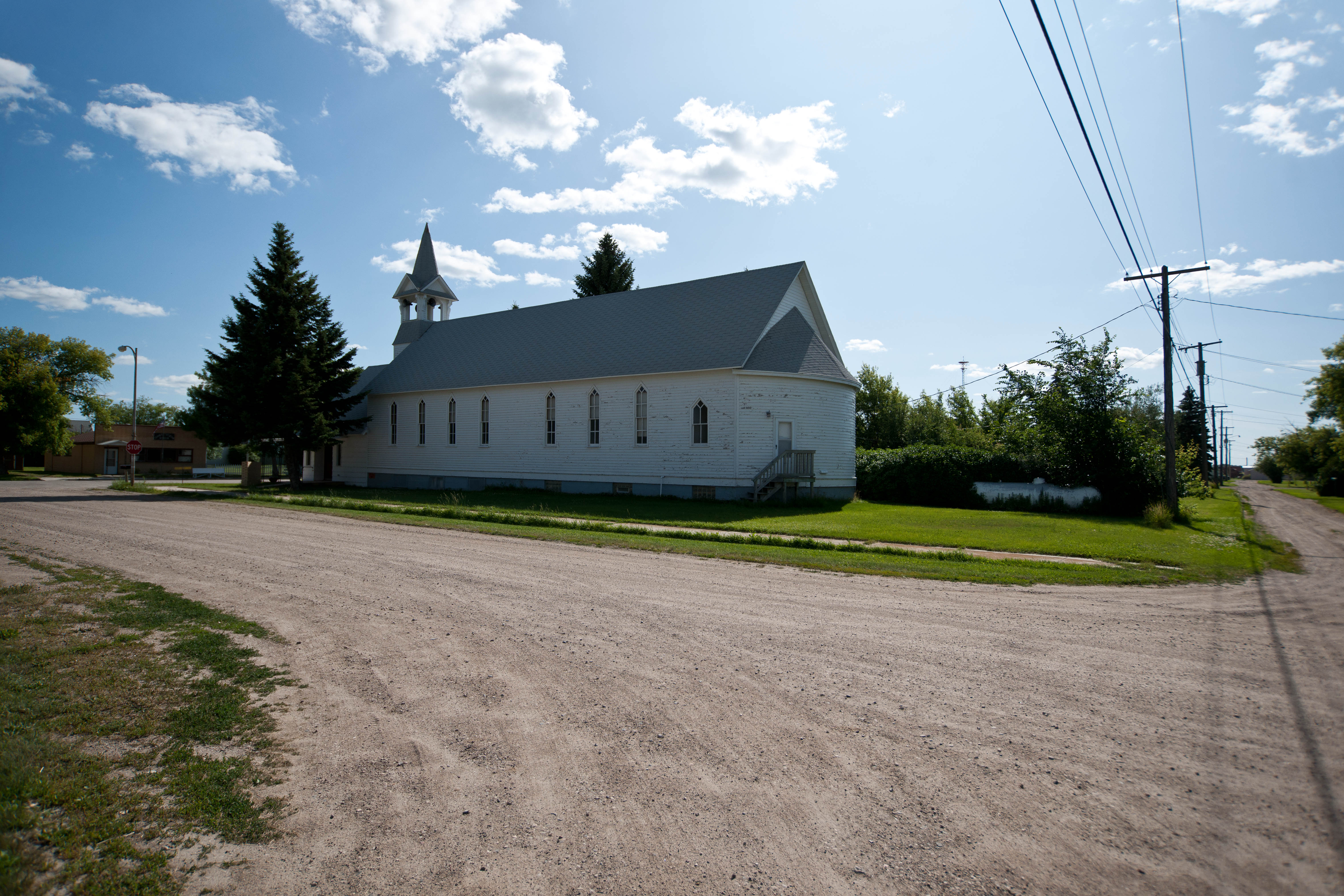
St. Paul's Lutheran Church

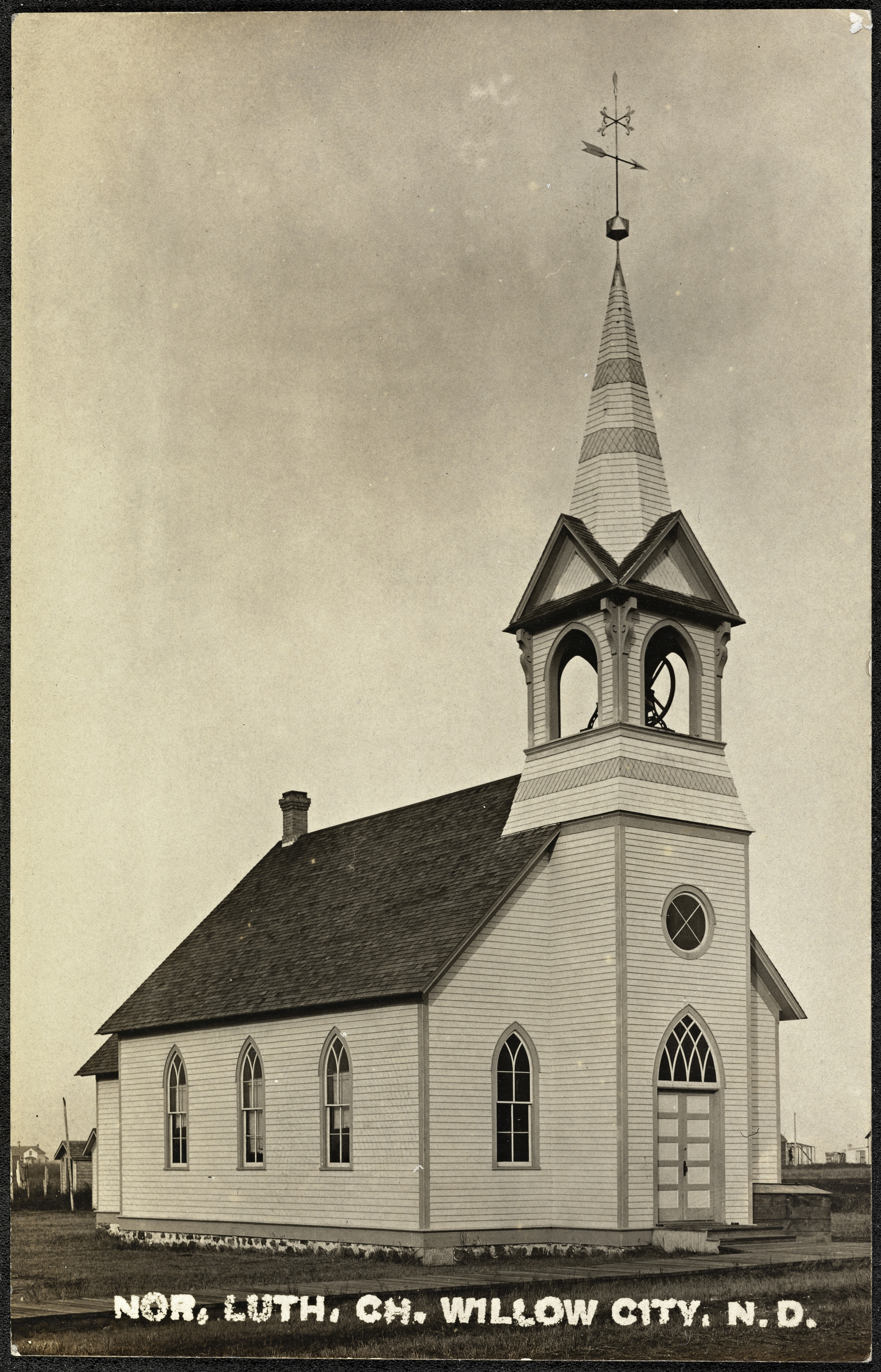
Norwegian Lutheran Church, undated
