= Wood B. Kyle =

U.S. Marine Corps Major General

Wood Barbee Kyle
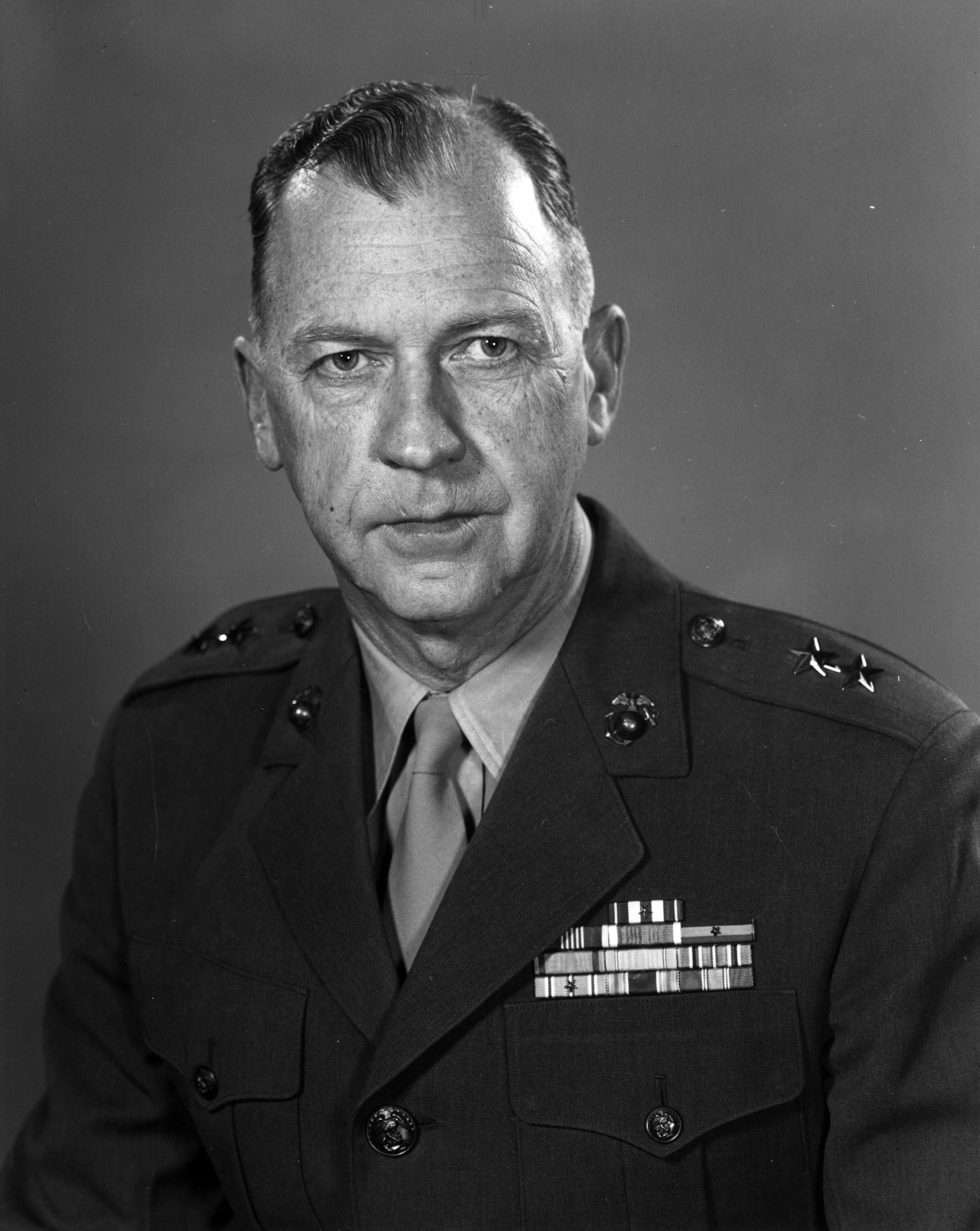
- MG Wood B. Kyle, USMC
- Born: March 3, 1915; Pecos, Texas, U.S.
- Died: October 25, 2000 (aged 85); Carlsbad, California, U.S.
- Military career
- Allegiance: United States of America
- Branch: United States Marine Corps
- Service years: 1936–1968
- Rank: Major general
- Service number: 0-5369
- Commands: Camp Pendleton; 4th Marine Division; 5th Marine Division; 3rd Marine Division; 4th Marine Regiment; 1st Battalion, 2nd Marines
- Conflicts: Yangtze Patrol; World War II: Battle of Guadalcanal; Battle of Tarawa; Battle of Saipan; Battle of Tinian; Vietnam War: Operation Hastings; Operation Prairie
- Awards: Distinguished Service Medal; Silver Star (2); Legion of Merit; Army Commendation Medal; Purple Heart

Wood Barbee Kyle (March 3, 1915 – October 25, 2000) was a highly decorated officer of the United States Marine Corps with the rank of major general. Kyle received two Silver Stars for gallantry in action during Pacific Campaign in World War II. He later took part in the Vietnam War and distinguished himself as commanding general of the 3rd Marine Division.

== Early years ==
Kyle was born on March 3, 1915, in Pecos, Texas, and grew up in Hillsboro, where he attended a local high school. Upon his graduation in the summer of 1932, Kyle went to College Station, where he attended Texas A&M University. While at university, he was a member of ROTC unit and following his graduation in June 1936 with a bachelor's degree, Kyle was commissioned as a second lieutenant in the U.S. Army Reserve.

However, Kyle resigned his U.S. Army commission;to accept an appointment as a second lieutenant in the United States Marine Corps on July 11, 1936. He was subsequently ordered to the Basic School at Philadelphia Navy Yard for his basic officers' training and graduated in April of the following year. He was in the same class as another future general, Lewis W. Walt.

Kyle was subsequently ordered to attached to San Diego, California, and appointed platoon leader in the 6th Marine Regiment, 2nd Marine Brigade. He embarked for China in October 1937 and later took part in the guard duties at the International Settlement of Shanghai. His unit was ordered back to the States in April 1938 and subsequently served at Marine Corps Base San Diego until May 1940. Meanwhile, Kyle was promoted to the rank of first lieutenant in July 1939. He then served with the Marine detachment aboard the aircraft carrier USS Lexington and took part in the patrol cruises off the coast of Hawaii.

== World War II ==
With the Japanese Attack on Pearl Harbor on December 7, 1941, Kyle was promoted to the temporary rank of captain and ordered to San Diego, where he was appointed company commander within 1st Battalion, 2nd Marines under Colonel John M. Arthur. The 2nd Marines were tasked with the training of new recruits, before they were ordered to Koro Island in July 1942. Kyle was promoted to the rank of major during the following month and appointed executive officer of 1st Battalion under Lieutenant Colonel Robert E. Hill.

During the Guadalcanal Campaign, 1st Battalion landed on the island at the beginning of October 1942 and immediately took part in the actions against Japanese units. On November 10, Lt. Col. Hill was severely wounded by enemy artillery fire in Matanikau sector and was evacuated from the island. Despite being injured, Kyle took over the battalion's command and insisted on staying with his soldiers rather than being evacuated. He successfully drove through relentless Japanese resistance to capture his objective. In the final assault launched in the same area, Major Kyle further distinguished himself when, by his dauntless courage and expert professional ability, he completed his assigned mission within four hours of its initiation. He was decorated with the Silver Star for his gallantry in action and the Purple Heart for his wounds.

Kyle remained with 1st Battalion at Guadalcanal until the end of January 1943 and subsequently was ordered to Wellington, New Zealand. He was appointed permanent commanding officer of 1st Battalion and spent following several months with training and reorganization for upcoming combat deployment – Tarawa.

The first battalion was designated regimental reserve, but casualties were so high, that Colonel David M. Shoup ordered Kyle and his unit ashore during the first hours of the landing. Major Kyle immediately directed his companies’ in the bitter assault against a fanatic enemy and despite the extreme danger, personally commanded his men in brilliantly executed attacks against the heavily defended central sector of the island. Assuming control of the remnants of one of the battalions of his regiment the following day, he promptly reorganized the unit for further sustained operations against the strongly entrenched Japanese.

Kyle received his second Silver Star for his actions on Tarawa and was promoted to the rank of lieutenant colonel in December 1943. His battalion was then ordered to Hawaii for rest and refit and Kyle enjoyed peaceful service until the end of May 1944. He then led his battalion to Saipan and Tinian.

He was ordered to the United States under rotation policy in October 1944 and attached to the staff of Camp Pendleton under Major General Charles F. B. Price. Kyle remained in that capacity until January 1945, when he was ordered for instruction to the Army Command and General Staff College at Fort Leavenworth, Kansas. He graduated two months later and was attached as an instructor to the college's faculty.

== Later service ==
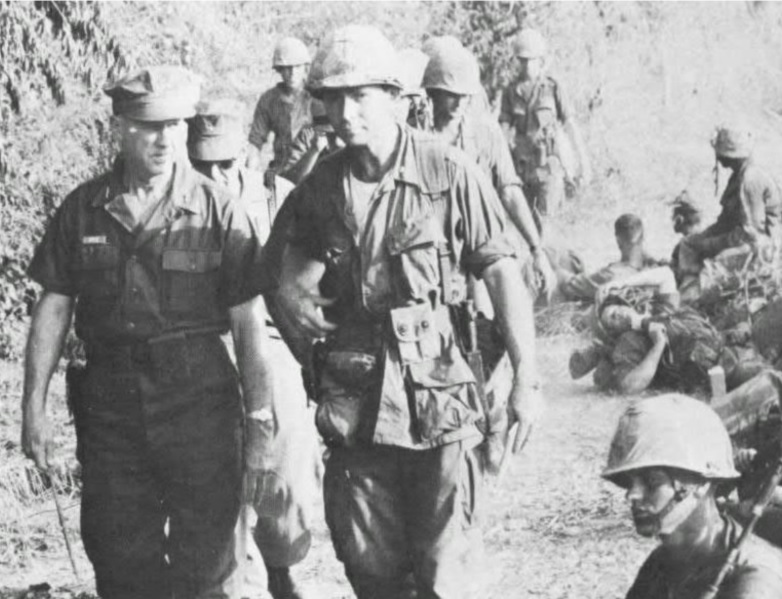
MG Wood B. Kyle (left), CG 3d Marine Division, walks with LTC Paul X. Kelley, CO 2/4 after the battalion secured Phuong Dinh, Vietnam.

Upon detachment from Fort Leavenworth in August 1947, Kyle was decorated with Army Commendation Medal for his service there and ordered to Pearl Harbor for duty at Headquarters Fleet Marine Force, Pacific. Kyle served under Lieutenant General Thomas E. Watson as assistant operations officer and took part in service in Guam, Qingdao and Hawaii.

In June 1949, Kyle was ordered to Washington, D.C., and appointed executive officer of Division of Reserve, Headquarters Marine Corps under Major General Merwin H. Silverthorn. Kyle later served as liaison officer between Marine Headquarters and the Reserve Forces Policy Board and also as assistant director of reserves for a brief period. He was promoted to the rank of colonel in November 1951. During his tenure there, Marine Corps Reserve forces grew from 38,403 to 123,000 reservists.

Kyle was transferred to the staff of Amphibious Training Command, Atlantic Fleet at Little Creek Base, Virginia in June 1952 as served as operations officer until August 1954. He was subsequently ordered to Okinawa, Japan and appointed commanding officer of 4th Marine Regiment.

In July 1956, Kyle was ordered to Carlisle Barracks, Pennsylvania and attended course at Army War College there. Upon graduation in August of that year, he became Chief of Tactics Branch, Tactics and Technique Board, Marine Corps Landing Force Development Center at Quantico, Virginia.

Kyle was ordered to Paris, France, in June 1958 and was appointed Chief of Joint Plans Branch, Operations Division, Headquarters United States European Command under General Lauris Norstad. While in this capacity, he was promoted to the rank of brigadier general on April 1, 1961.

He was ordered back to the United States in August 1961, and his first general officer's billet was as Commanding General Force Troops, Fleet Marine Force Atlantic (FMFLANT) at Camp Lejeune, North Carolina. In this capacity, he was responsible for all independent units under FMFLANT such as support artillery units, anti-aircraft artillery units, military police battalions, separate engineer units and other miscellaneous force units. Kyle remained in that capacity until the end of August 1963, when he was relieved by Brigadier General Donn J. Robertson and ordered back to Headquarters-U.S. Marine Corps.

== Vietnam War ==
After almost three years as deputy chief of staff for research and development, Kyle was promoted to the rank of major general in March 1966 and ordered to South Vietnam. He relieved Major General Lewis W. Walt as commanding general of 3rd Marine Division at Chu Lai Base and immediately took part in the planning of search and destroy operations in Quảng Nam Province.

Kyle also helped with the suppression of the Buddhist Uprising, when rebel ARVN units tried to move to Da Nang and Kyle ordered to block them in their advance. He later commanded 3rd Marine Division during defensive combat operations within the Vietnamese Demilitarized Zone until March 1967, when he relinquished command to Major General Bruno Hochmuth. Kyle was decorated with Navy Distinguished Service Medal and several South Vietnamese military decorations for his service in Vietnam.

Following his return stateside, Kyle was ordered to Camp Pendleton and assumed command of 5th Marine Division. The division did not deploy overseas and served as a training unit. Kyle later served as commanding general of the nucleus of 4th Marine Division, which had the same purpose as 5th Division. He received the Legion of Merit for his service at Camp Pendleton.

Major General Kyle retired from the United States Marine Corps on August 31, 1968, after 32 years of active service. He then settled with his wife in Carlsbad, California, and died on October 25, 2000.

== Decorations ==
A complete list of Kyle's medals and decorations include:

1st Row	Navy Distinguished Service Medal			
2nd Row	Silver Star with one 5/16" Gold Star	Legion of Merit	Army Commendation Medal	Purple Heart
3rd Row	Navy Presidential Unit Citation with two stars	China Service Medal	American Defense Service Medal	American Campaign Medal
4th Row	Asiatic-Pacific Campaign Medal with one 3/16 inch silver service star	World War II Victory Medal	National Defense Service Medal with one star	Vietnam Service Medal with two 3/16 inch service stars
5th Row	Vietnam National Order of Vietnam, Knight	Vietnam Gallantry Cross with Palm	Vietnam Choung My Medal, 1st class	Vietnam Campaign Medal

=== First Silver Star citation ===
Citation:

The President of the United States of America takes pleasure in presenting the Silver Star to Major Wood Barbee Kyle (MCSN: 0-5369), United States Marine Corps, for conspicuous gallantry and intrepidity while serving as Executive Officer of the First Battalion, Second Marines, Reinforced, in action against enemy Japanese forces in the Matanikau River Sector, Guadalcanal, Solomon Islands, from 1 November 1942 to 14 January 1943. Refusing to be evacuated when he was wounded in action during the vital offensive operations of his battalion, Major Kyle assumed command of the battalion after the commanding officer had been forced to withdraw as a result of serious wounds, and with keen initiative and aggressive leadership successfully drove through relentless Japanese resistance to capture his objective. In the final assault launched in the same area, Major Kyle further distinguished himself when, by his dauntless courage and expert professional ability, he completed his assigned mission within four hours of its initiation. His exemplary conduct and unswerving devotion to duty throughout the entire active period were in keeping with the highest traditions of the United States Naval Service.

=== Second Silver Star citation ===
Citation:

The President of the United States of America takes pleasure in presenting a Gold Star in lieu of a Second Award of the Silver Star to Major Wood Barbee Kyle (MCSN: 0-5369), United States Marine Corps, for conspicuous gallantry and intrepidity as Commanding Officer of the First Battalion, Second Marines, SECOND Marine Division, during action against enemy Japanese forces at Tarawa, Gilbert Islands, from 20 to 24 November 1943. Landing with his troops during the initial stages of the fierce hostilities on D-Day, Major Kyle immediately directed his companies in the bitter assault against a fanatic enemy and, despite the extreme danger, personally commanded his men in brilliantly executed attacks against the heavily defended central sector of the island. Assuming control of the remnants of one of the battalions of his regiment the following day, he promptly reorganized the unit for further sustained operations against the strongly entrenched Japanese. By his forceful and inspiring leadership, his daring combat tactics and cool and courageous action in the face of grave peril, Major Kyle contributed materially to the success of our forces in capturing this vital hostile stronghold and his zealous devotion to duty throughout was in keeping with the highest traditions of the United States Naval Service.

== See also ==
- 3rd Marine Division
- 4th Marine Division
- 5th Marine Division
- Buddhist Uprising
- Battle of Guadalcanal
- Battle of Tarawa
- List of 3rd Marine Division Commanders

Military offices
Preceded by Lewis J. Fields	Commanding General of the 4th Marine Division; June 15, 1968 - July 17, 1968	Succeeded by Donn J. Robertson
Preceded by Lewis J. Fields	Commanding General of the 5th Marine Division; April 1, 1967 - July 17, 1968	Succeeded by Donn J. Robertson
Preceded by Lewis W. Walt	Commanding General of the 3rd Marine Division; March 18, 1966 - March 17, 1967	Succeeded by Bruno A. Hochmuth
