= Battle of Dai Do =

Part of the Vietnam War (1968)

- Part of the Vietnam War
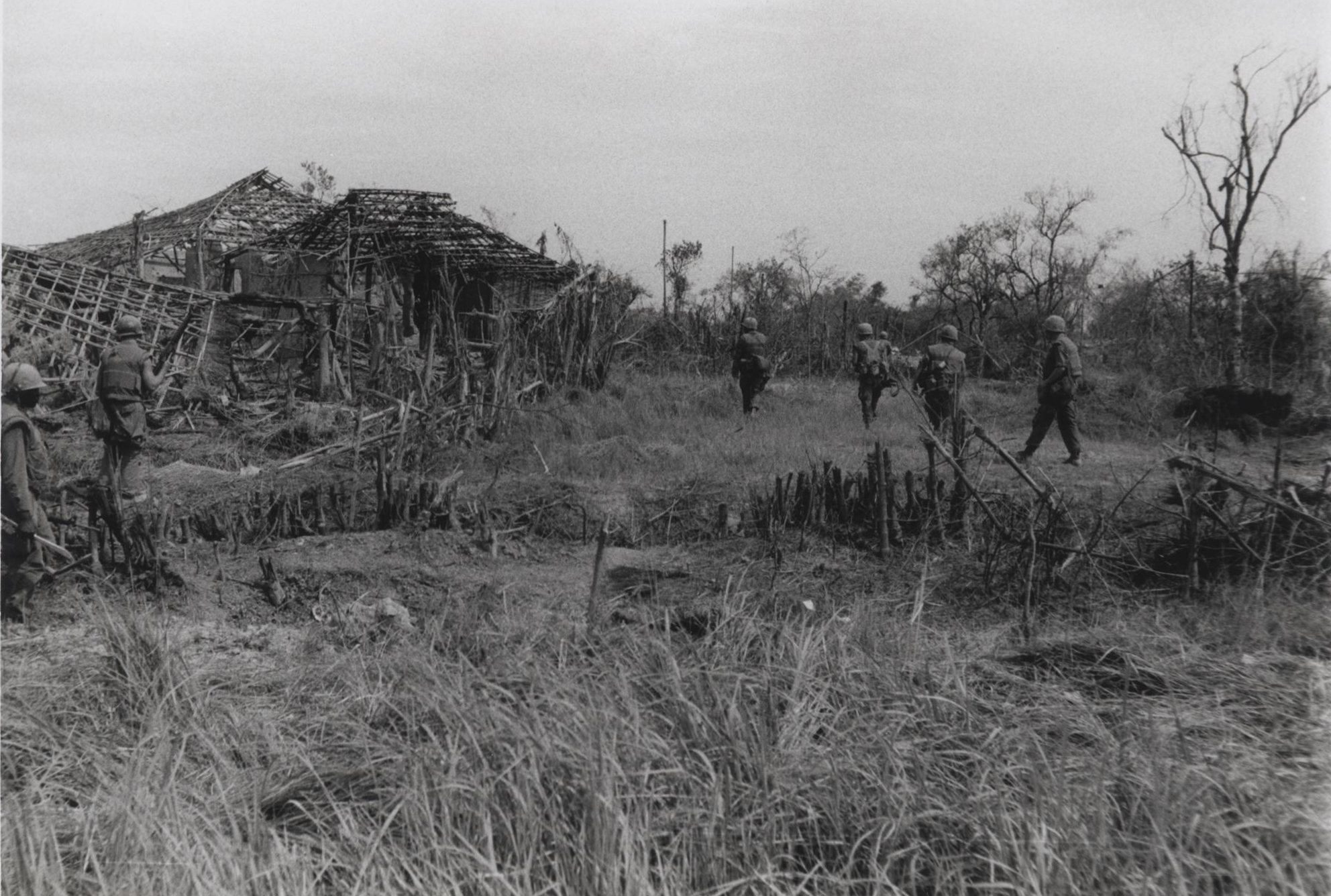
- 2nd Battalion, 4th Marines search Dai Do village
Date	30 April – 3 May 1968
Location	Cửa Việt River, Quảng Trị Province, South Vietnam
Result	Both sides claim victory

Belligerents
United States; South Vietnam	North Vietnam

Commanders and leaders
MG Rathvon M. Tompkins; LTC William Weise; LTC Vũ Văn Giai	MG Trần Quý Hai

Units involved
(United States) XXIV Corps; 1st Amphibian Tractor Battalion; 2nd Battalion, 4th Marines; 1st Battalion, 3rd Marines; 3rd Battalion, 21st Infantry (South Vietnam) I Corps; 2nd Regiment, 1st Division	(Vietnam) DMZ Front; 3rd Battalion, 48th Regiment; 6th Battalion, 52nd Regiment; 64th Regiment; 4th Battalion, 270th Regiment

Casualties and losses
(United States) 81 killed (South Vietnam) 5 killed PAVN Claim: (United States) 500+ killed	US body count: 639+ killed

The Battle of Dai Do (also known as the Battle of Đông Hà) took place from 30 April to 3 May 1968 in Quảng Trị Province during the Vietnam War.

== Background ==
The Cửa Việt River served as a vital supply line for the 3rd Marine Division in northern Quảng Trị Province, running from the Cửa Việt Base to the Đông Hà Combat Base which in turn supported the Marine bases along the Demilitarized Zone (DMZ).

The Cửa Việt area was part of the Napoleon/Saline operational area with the 1st Amphibian Tractor Battalion responsible for securing the Cửa Việt Base and its vicinity. The 1st AMTRAC Battalion had operational control of a rotation of Marine infantry battalions.

== Battle ==
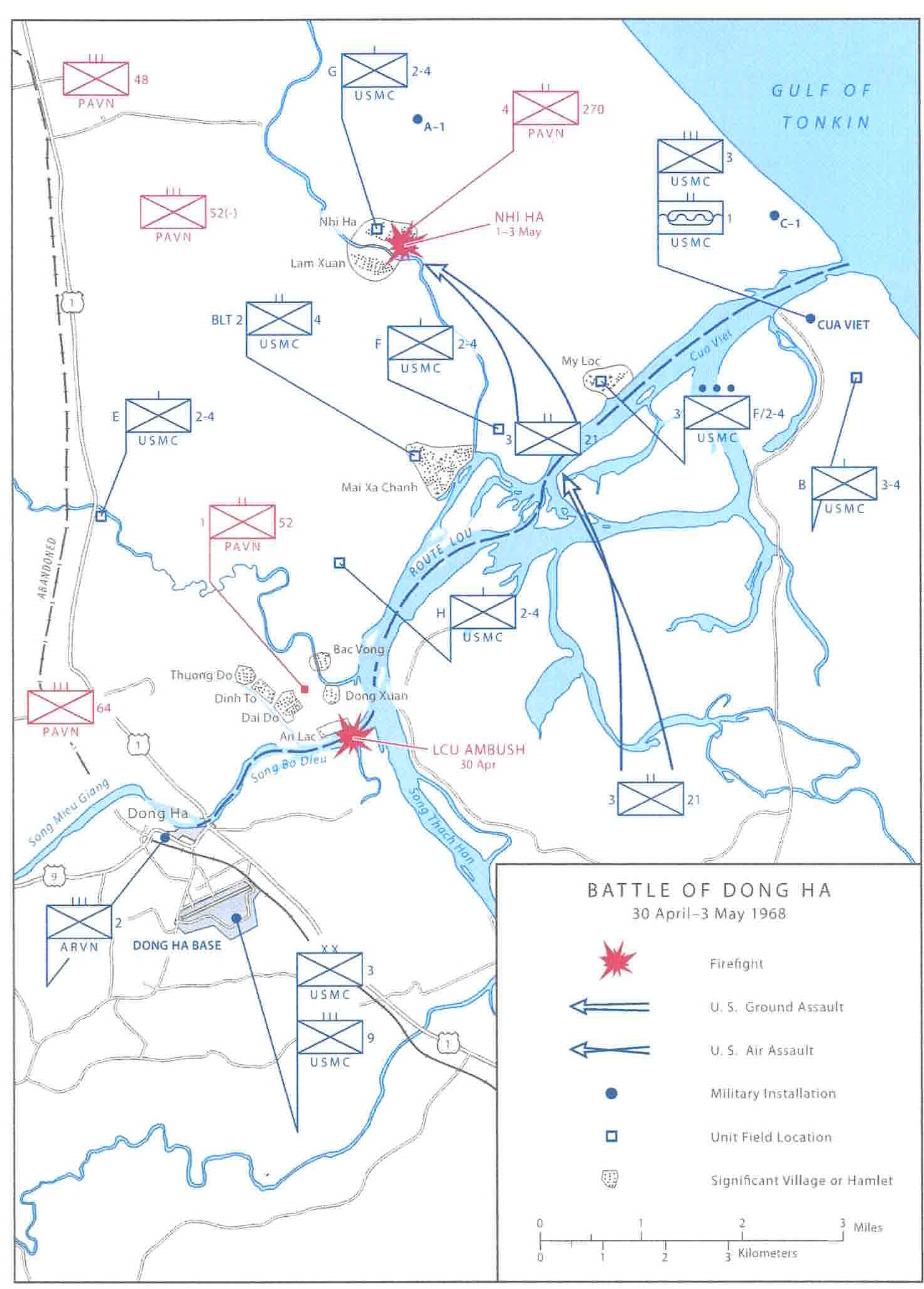
Battle of Dai Do, 30 April - 3 May 1968

In late April, at least four People's Army of Vietnam (PAVN) Battalions, two of them for certain from the 48th and 52nd Regiments of the 320th Division, infiltrated past the Army of the Republic of Vietnam (ARVN) 2nd Regiment to occupy the area around Dai Do (16.841°N 107.111°E) 2.5 km northeast of Đông Hà. The PAVN moved into a series of pre-built mutually supporting bunkers surrounded by barbed wire which had been built over the preceding weeks unnoticed by the ARVN who were responsible for security in the area.

At daybreak on 30 April, the allies discovered PAVN troops dug into the north bank of the Bo Dieu River from Dong Ha to the edge of the Cửa Việt estuary. Major general Rathvon M. Tompkins the 3rd Marine Division commander learned that at least one battalion from the 52nd Regiment and a heavy weapons company had fortified a cluster of hamlets around Dai Do, just two kilometers northeast of Dong Ha. PAVN troops had also been spotted along the river farther east toward the Cửa Việt estuary. The 64th Regiment had established positions along the west side of Highway 1 to block the 9th Marine units based in the Kentucky sector. The 48th Regiment had established a defensive line along Highway 1 to block ARVN battalions at Gio Linh and at Firebase C–4. Adding to his problems, Tompkins also got wind that elements of the PAVN independent 270th Regiment had occupied a hamlet named Nhi Ha, about ten kilometers northeast of Dong Ha, threatening came south into the Napoleon/Saline sector to attack shipping in the Cửa Việt estuary.

At 03:30 on 30 April, PAVN in the hamlet of An Lac (16.838°N 107.120°E) fired on a United States Navy PBR, which returned fire and then returned to Đông Hà Base. At 04:00, the PAVN opened fire on an LCU causing severe damage and killing one sailor. At 07:00, a patrol from Company H, 2/4 Marines operating north of Dai Do was sent to investigate the area. Two platoons from Company F were ordered aboard AMTRACs to move to join Company H. As Company H advanced towards the suspected PAVN position they came under heavy machine gun, mortar and rocket fire from across a stream in the hamlet of Dong Xuan (16.8436°N 107.120°E). Company H was withdrawn to await the arrival of the Company F reinforcements. The reconnaissance platoon and two M48s were also sent as reinforcements. The Marines called in air and artillery strikes which were reported to have knocked out three PAVN machine guns and Company H crossed the stream 400m northwest of Dong Xuan. Company F riding on AMTRACs crossed the stream west of Company H and positioned itself to attack Dai Do. At 14:00, both companies launched their attack and by 15:00 Company H had secured Dong Xuan. Company F's attack on Dai Do was stopped some 300m short of the hamlet, recoilless rifle fire had knocked out two AMTRACs, while mortar and machine gun fire had stopped the infantry advance. An attempt to reinforce Company F by landing Company G nearby was stopped when PAVN forces attacked Company G's landing zone near Lam Xuan. At 16:25, Company B 1/3 Marines aboard AMTRACs landed south of An Lac under cover of Task Force Clearwater gun boats. Company B was met by intense fire which destroyed one AMTRAC and disabled another, nevertheless Company B captured half of An Lac hamlet until its advance was brought to a halt and its commanding officer killed. 1st AMTRAC Battalion commander, Colonel Hull ordered Company F to withdraw from Dai Do and join Company H in Dong Xuan so the Marines would only have two perimeters to defend overnight. That night the PAVN probed the Company F/H position at Dong Xuan but were deterred by Marine artillery. Marines losses for the day were 16 dead while PAVN losses were 90 dead.

The 2/4 Marines commander Lieutenant colonel William Weise felt that inadequate resources were provided for the attack on Dai Do, both in terms of men and air and artillery support. Tompkins could not be sure whether this was the main thrust of the May Offensive along the DMZ or a diversion for a larger attack still to come, however by the end of 30 April it was clear that the PAVN intended to either attack Đông Hà Base or move through the area and attack Quảng Trị. With limited Marine reserves available, Tompkins requested Army reinforcements from XXIV Corps commander Lieutenant general William B. Rosson who sent the 3rd Battalion, 21st Infantry Regiment to a landing zone north of Đông Hà on the morning of 1 May.

On the morning of 1 May, Company B patrols in An Lac found that the PAVN had deserted the hamlet overnight. Outside the hamlet they saw a group of approximately 60 PAVN moving across paddyfields north of An Lac and opened fire on them in what was described as a "turkey shoot". While artillery fire continued to be directed at Dai Do, at 10:00, Company G and two M48s were landed by LCMs at An Lac and moved west through Company B's positions to attack Dai Do. Company G was met by intense fire from the entrenched PAVN and had to knock out each bunker one by one, eventually reaching the north of Dai Do by 14:00 after having suffered heavy losses and both tanks being immobilized. The PAVN then counterattacked from the north and west of Dai Do and from bypassed positions to the south forcing Company G to withdraw and establish a perimeter east of Dai Do. A large PAVN force, including an artillery spotter team was observed in the hamlet of Truc Kinh (16.853°N 107.104°E) 3 km northeast of Dai Do and airstrikes were directed on them resulting in a decline in the effectiveness of PAVN artillery fire. Company F at Dong Xuan attempted to move south to support Company G but was stopped by PAVN fire and returned to Dong Xuan. At 17:00 Company B in An Lac was ordered to move west to support Company G but was stopped by PAVN fire which injured their replacement company commander. Company B was ordered back to An Lac where it linked up with Company E which had marched south along Highway 1 and then northeast across the stream. Marine losses for the day were 24 dead while PAVN losses were 91 dead and two captured.

At 05:00 on 2 May, Company E attacked northeast from An Lac towards Company G's position near Dai Do in the face of heavy PAVN fire. Meanwhile, Company G attacked PAVN positions in southern Dai Dao knocking out bunkers with White Phosphrous grenades, Satchel charges and M72 LAWs. By 09:30, Companies E and G had secured Dai Do. With Dai Do secured, the Marines sought to squeeze the PAVN with a Hammer and anvil approach, while an ARVN mechanized battalion would secure the hamlets of Dong Lai and Thong Nghia (16.846°N 107.0996°E) and establish blocking positions, the Marines would attack northwest taking the hamlets of Dinh To (16.844°N 107.1064°E) and Thuong Do (16.846°N 107.104°E).

At 13:00, Company H attacked northwest from Dai Do towards Dinh To in the face of heavy PAVN fire which stalled their advance through the hamlet, the PAVN then counterattacked and the company commander radioed that he was in danger of being overrun. Company E, although numbering only 30 men, immediately moved forward to support Company H, pushing forward into the PAVN defenses until a large PAVN counterattack stopped their advance and threatened to overwhelm them. Both companies were ordered back to Dai Do under the cover of Marine airstrikes. Hull liaised with the ARVN mechanized battalion which was now west of Dai Do and it was agreed that they would advance 1 km north to Thong Nghia while the Marines renewed their attack on Dinh To. At 16:00, the attack on Dinh To resumed with Company G (now down to 40 men) in the lead, followed by Company F (80 men). Company G pushed through the now lightly defended Dinh To and had reached the outskirts of Thuong Do when it was stopped by PAVN fire from across the stream which still had not been reached by the ARVN. Company F advancing slightly further east meanwhile had met heavy PAVN fire and become separated from Company G. The PAVN then counterattacked at Thuong Do and Company G fought back surrounded by a wall of Marine artillery fire, eventually withdrawing to meet up with Company F and both companies then withdrew to Dinh To and then Dai Do. Marine losses for the day were 40 dead while PAVN losses were almost 380.

Morning of April 30. Attacks by companies H and F.

Afternoon of April 30. Assault by Company B, An Lac.

May 1. Attacks by companies G and B, return of Company E.

May 2. Attack by Company H. Rescue by Company E. Enemy counterattacks.

== Aftermath ==
On the morning of 3 May, the PAVN had largely abandoned the Dai Do area. BLT 1/3 Marines relieved BLT 2/4 Marines and swept through Dinh To and Thuong Do meeting no resistance. The Marines had lost 81 killed in the battle, while they claimed PAVN had lost at least 600 killed. Company E commander Captain James E. Livingston and Company G commander Captain Jay R. Vargas were each awarded the Medal of Honor for their actions during the battle, while 2/4 Marines commander Weise was awarded the Navy Cross. The ARVN had lost five dead and they claimed 39 PAVN were killed in their advance to Thong Nghia.

The PAVN have never released their casualties for Dai Do, but claimed victory stating that they had defeated three Marine Battalions and elements of the non-existent US "73rd Air Cavalry Brigade" on 2 May, killing over 500 Americans.

Max Hastings writing in 2018, described Dai Do as an "act of sustained folly," blaming Hull and Tompkins for not appreciating the tactical situation and continuing with costly frontal attacks on 1 and 2 May. Weise stated "I don't believe Tompkins ever realized what was going on."
