= Operation Napoleon/Saline =

Part of the Vietnam War (1967–1968)

- Part of Vietnam War
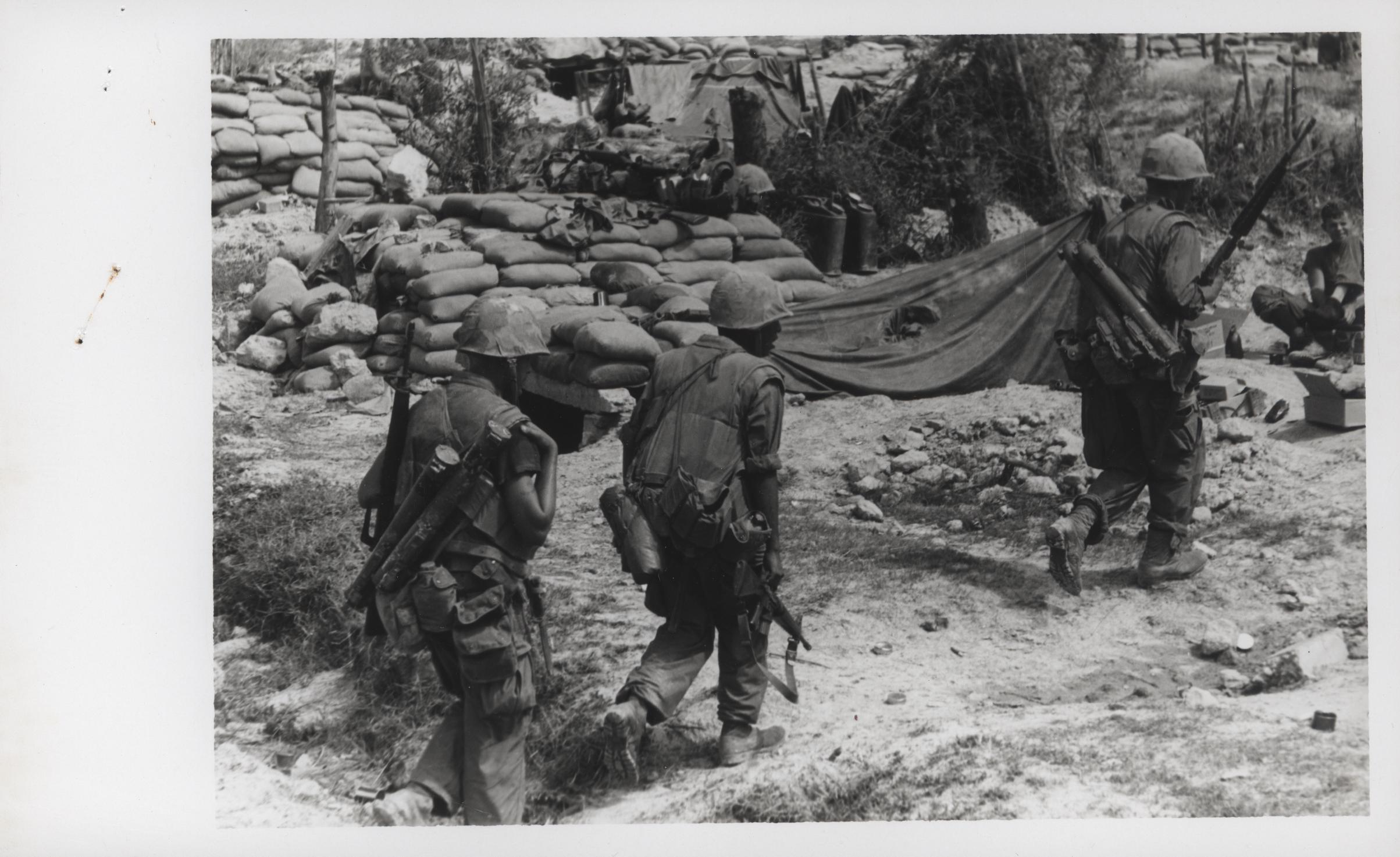
- Marines return from patrol during Operation Napoleon/Saline
Date	November 1967 – 9 December 1968
Location	Cửa Việt River (Song Thach Han), Quảng Trị Province, South Vietnam
Result	Allied victory

Belligerents
United States; South Vietnam	North Vietnam

Commanders and leaders
MG Rathvon M. Tompkins; MG Raymond G. Davis; Col. Milton A. Hull; Lt. Col. William Weise; Col. Ross T. Dwyer	

Units involved
(United States) 1st Amphibian Tractor Battalion; 2nd Battalion, 1st Marines; 3rd Battalion, 1st Marines; 1st Battalion, 3rd Marines; 2nd Battalion, 3rd Marines; 3rd Battalion, 3rd Marines; 1st Battalion, 4th Marines; 2nd Battalion, 4th Marines; 3rd Battalion, 4th Marines; 1st Battalion, 9th Marines; 2nd Battalion, 9th Marines; 2nd Battalion, 26th Marines; 2nd Brigade, 1st Cavalry Division; 3rd Battalion, 21st Infantry Regiment; 1st Brigade, 5th Infantry Division (Mechanized) (South Vietnam) 2nd Regiment	K400 Main Force Battalion; 48th Regiment; 52nd Regiment; 138th Regiment; 270th Regiment; 803rd Regiment

Casualties and losses
395 killed	US body count: 3,500+ killed

Operation Napoleon/Saline was a multi-Battalion operation conducted by the United States Marine Corps and the United States Army along the Cửa Việt River south of the DMZ in Quảng Trị Province. The operation ran from 20 January to 9 December 1968.

== Background ==
The Cửa Việt River served as a vital supply line for the 3rd Marine Division in northern Quảng Trị Province, running from the Cửa Việt Base to the Đông Hà Combat Base which in turn supported the Marine bases along the DMZ.

== Operation Napoleon ==
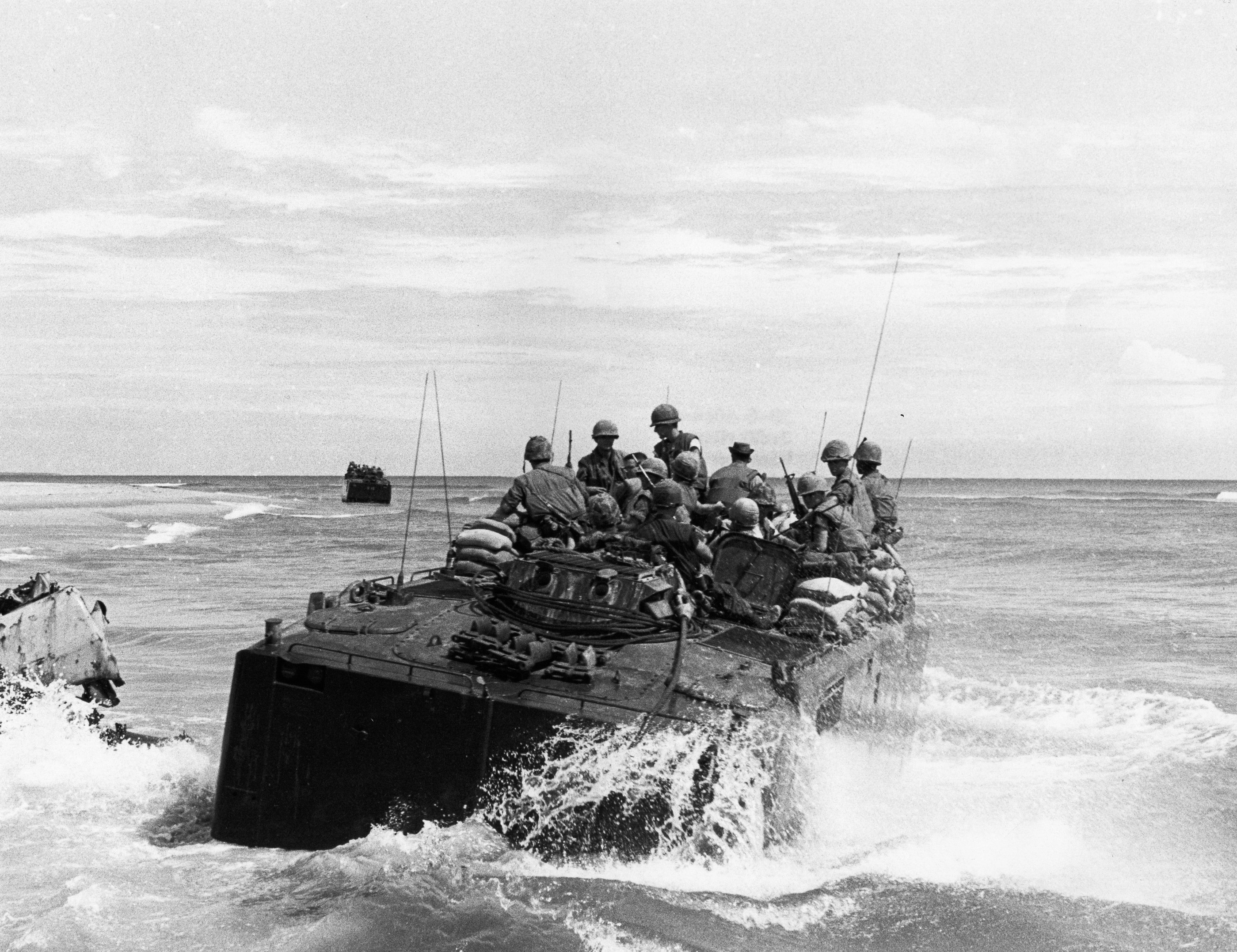
Company A, 1st Amtrac Battalion, operating north of the Cửa Việt River (Song Thach Han), 14 September 1967

The 1st Amphibian Tractor Battalion was moved to the Cửa Việt Base at the mouth of the Cửa Việt River in April 1967 and was responsible for securing the base and its vicinity. In November 1967 the Cửa Việt area was split off from the Operation Kingfisher tactical area of operations as Operation Napoleon. The Napoleon area of operations formed a rectangle covering the area 3 miles (4.8 km) above and 2 miles (3.2 km) below the Cửa Việt River extending 2 miles (3.2 km) inland from the coast. The main positions within this area were the Cửa Việt Base and Strongpoint A-1 (16.924°N 107.173°E). The 1st AMTRAC Battalion was also given responsibility for the construction of Strongpoint C-4 (16.879°N 107.077°E), part of the Strongpoint Obstacle System 2 km north of the Cửa Việt and supporting the Army of the Republic of Vietnam (ARVN) 2nd Regiment, 1st Division in the construction of Strongpoint A-1 (16.933°N 107.131°E).

On 10 December 1967 the 1st AMTRAC Battalion and the attached Company F, 2nd Battalion, 4th Marines were protecting the movement of building materials to Strongpoint C-4, 2 km north of the Cửa Việt River. As two squads from 2/4 Marines patrolled near the village of Ha Loi Tay they were hit by sniper fire, the Marines engaged their attackers killing 8 People's Army of Vietnam (PAVN) soldiers for the loss of 1 Marine killed. The Marines searched the surrounding area and engaged another group of 20-25 PAVN some wearing U.S. military equipment. The squads called for assistance and were reinforced by a platoon and later by another 2 platoons and 2 LVTH-6 howitzer equipped AMTRACs. The Marines then formed a night defensive perimeter. At 06:30 on 11 December the Marines moved back into the area of the previous day's engagement and at 08:00 saw a group of more than 40 PAVN in the area. The Marines attempted to pin the PAVN against an Army of the Republic of Vietnam (ARVN) Battalion at Strongpoint A-1 2.5 km to the west, but the PAVN moved around the Marines and began attacking them from the south, hitting the LVTH-6s with 10 Rocket-propelled grenades to little effect and then with mortar fire before being pushed back after a 30-minute fight. The PAVN launched a renewed assault from the north, northeast and south. The Marines fought back supported by artillery and naval gunfire forcing the PAVN to withdraw leaving 54 dead while the Marines suffered 20 wounded. A search of the area uncovered a large PAVN supply dump which the Marines destroyed before returning to Strongpoint C-4.

On 16 December a PAVN mortar and rocket attack on Cửa Việt Base killed 5 Marines. By the end of 1967 Operation Napoleon had resulted in 87 PAVN dead and 2 captured for the loss of 10 Marine dead.

In January 1968 Company C, 1st Battalion, 3rd Marines was attached to the 1st AMTRAC Battalion in place of Company F 2/4 Marines. On the night of 14 January a Marine squad from Company B, 1st AMTRAC Battalion observed a PAVN unit near the village of Tuong Van Tuong southwest of Cửa Việt Base and called in artillery fire, while this fire hit the unit a sweep of the area the following morning failed to find any PAVN dead.

On the morning of 19 January a patrol from Company C, 1/3 Marines engaged elements of the PAVN K400 Main Force Battalion north of Strongpoint A-1, Marine artillery support was soon matched by PAVN artillery fire from across the DMZ and the fight lasted into the afternoon when the Marines withdrew having lost 3 killed, while PAVN losses were 23 killed.

On 20 January PAVN artillery fire targeted U.S. Navy supply boats on the Cửa Việt River forcing the closure of the waterway. The 1st AMTRAC Battalion and the 2nd ARVN Regiment began an operation near the site of the previous day's engagement and soon engaged a PAVN Battalion near the village of My Loc (16.888°N 107.160°E). PAVN artillery fire was used to cover their withdrawal in the afternoon. Marine losses were 13 dead, while PAVN losses were 40 dead and 2 captured.

At 02:00 on 21 January a 1/3 Marines outpost observed a PAVN unit digging in near the site of the 19 January battle and called in air and artillery strikes. On searching the area in the morning they found 9 PAVN dead. Later that morning a Navy LCM hit a mine on the Cửa Việt River and had to be towed back to Cửa Việt Base.

On the early morning of 22 January a U.S. Navy gunfire support observer at the A-1 Strongpoint observed a 3-500 man PAVN unit in the 19 January battle area and proceeded to call in air and artillery support. An ARVN patrol of the area suggested that more than 100 PAVN had probably been killed. Later that day a Navy LCU hit another mine on the Cửa Việt River and was towed back to the Cửa Việt Base and the river was again closed for demining. III Marine Amphibious Force commander LG Robert E. Cushman Jr. ordered MG Rathvon M. Tompkins to secure the banks of the Cửa Việt River and assigned Shore Landing Force Bravo's Battalion Landing Team 3rd Battalion, 1st Marines for this mission.

== Operation Saline ==
On the morning of 23 January the planning for Operation Badger Catch/Saline began and at 19:00 that evening the 3/1 Marines began landing at Blue Beach on the northern mouth of the Cửa Việt River. The Badger Catch operational area extended 5 km north of the Cửa Việt and 7 km inland overlapping with a large part of the Napoleon area. The ARVN would be responsible for securing the area south of the river.

On the morning of 24 January a PAVN command detonated mine sank an LCM on the river and elements of 3/1 Marines were lifted by HMM-165 helicopters to the suspected command site on an island in the river, but were unable to locate any PAVN. Meanwhile, the rest of 3/1 Marines secured the area east of the village of My Loc.

After taking fire from My Loc the previous day, at dawn on the 25th after preparatory artillery fire Company K, 3/1 Marines began an assault on My Loc but was stopped by heavy weapons fire and could only withdraw with tank support, losing 6 dead. At 10:00 PAVN artillery hit 2 LCMs on the Cửa Việt River wounding 5 Americans, U.S. return fire accidentally hit the Company K 3/1 Marines position. From 10:30 until 14:30 air strikes were called in on My Loc and when Company K assaulted the village again they found that the PAVN had withdrawn leaving 20 dead. The PAVN dead were determined to have come from the 803rd Regiment of the 324B Division which had moved its operational area east in an attempt to disrupt Marine supply lines.

On the afternoon of 26 January as it advanced towards the hamlet of Lam Xuan (16.906°N 107.124°E) 1.5 km northwest of My Loc, Company I 3/1 Marines were ambushed by an entrenched PAVN force. Marine tanks and Ontos were sent to support Company I and after a 5 hour long battle managed to disengage from the ambush site losing 8 Marines while killing 17 PAVN and capturing two.

== Operation Napoleon/Saline ==
At 14:00 on 27 February operational control of 3/1 Marines was transferred to the 1st AMTRAC Battalion.

On the night of 27 February radar-guided bomb attacks were made on Lam Xuan and then at 08:00 the village was hit by naval gunfire, however these attacks did little damage to the PAVN bunkers because when Company L 3/1 Marines attacked the village later that morning they were met by heavy fire and three tanks were disabled by land mines. Company L pulled back for further air and artillery strikes and in the afternoon Company L and Company K resumed the attack while Company M established a blocking position. At dusk the PAVN began to withdraw under cover of artillery fire from across the DMZ. The following day when the Marines entered Lam Xuan they found 69 dead and capture 2 soldiers, Marine losses were 8 dead.

The Tết truce which was to have come into effect across South Vietnam from 18:00 on 29 January was not observed along the DMZ.

On the early morning of 31 January Company M moved from My Loc to attack PAVN positions south of the hamlet of Mai Xa Thi (16.872°N 107.140°E) while Company K established blocking positions to the north. At 07:00 Company K opened fire on the hamlet and at 07:15 Company M began to advance towards the village. The attack was met by machine gun, mortar and artillery fire and Company L and several LVTs were sent to support Company M but were unable to penetrate the PAVN defenses. At 15:00 the two companies were ordered to pull back to allow air strikes against the village and the assault resumed and 16:00 and made slow progress, securing most of the village by 21:30. The next morning the Marines overran the remaining PAVN positions finding 44 dead and capturing two soldiers for the loss of 12 Marines. The village was found to have been the command post of the 3rd Battalion, 803rd Regiment.

On the afternoon of 1 February, suspecting a PAVN counterattack on Lam Xuan, the Company K commander received permission to abandon the hamlet and move 300m east. The move was carried out after dark and at 02:45 on 2 February PAVN mortar and artillery fire began to hit Company K's former positions in Lam Xuan. The PAVN then assaulted Lam Xuan and were met by fire from Company K's new position and by artillery fire. The PAVN attempted to reorient their attack but were pushed back by artillery fire. Two AMTRACs loaded with ammunition attempted to reach Company K but were forced back and then at dawn, reinforced by Company M and two tanks, they reached Company K's position and counterattacked against the PAVN fighting from hedgerow to hedgerow to overrun their positions. PAVN losses were 141 dead and seven captured while Marine losses were eight dead. The Marines then withdrew from Lam Xuan expecting the PAVN to retrieve their dead and the area was hit by artillery fire throughout the night.

On 24 February the Navy established Task Force Clearwater composed on 20 PBRs plus assorted support ships to keep the Cửa Việt River open. Throughout February PAVN gunners killed seven sailors and damaged 27 vessels on the river.

On 29 February Tompkins merged Operation Napoleon and Saline into one operation under the command of the 3rd Marine Regiment commanded by Col. Milton A. Hull, which moved its headquarters to Cửa Việt Base. The Marines and ARVN claimed over 1000 PAVN killed in area during the month of February.

On 1 March Company M 3/1 Marines supported by two LVTE-1s and two LVTH-6s conducted a sweep of Mai Xa Thi. The LVTEs shot line charges into the hamlet to clear houses along the river's edge while the LVTHs fired Canister shot into the village. As the LVTs moved into the hamlet they were met by heavy weapons fire from the west. Company I was ordered to support the west flank of Company M and they engaged the PAVN in battle until dusk, killing 36 PAVN and capturing three. Sweeping the area over the next 2 days the Marines found a further 83 PAVN dead and captured 1 soldier, Marines losses were 27 dead. Prisoner interrogations revealed that the 52nd Regiment of the 320th Division had moved south of the DMZ to replace 803rd Regiment which had moved south into Thừa Thiên Province.

On 4 March 1/3 Marines joined the operation and the following day BLT 2/4 Marines replaced BLT 3/1 Marines.

On 10 March Cửa Việt Base was hit by PAVN artillery, destroying 150 tons of ammunition, damaging numerous buildings and killing one American.

On 18 March as 2/4 Marines patrolled an abandoned hamlet 1 km south of Mai Xa Thi they were engaged by heavy weapons and artillery fire. The Marines called in air and artillery support and on entering the hamlet the next day found 72 dead PAVN and captured four, while the Marines lost 13 dead. Throughout March the Marines killed more than 440 PAVN for the loss of 65 Marines.

On 11 April PAVN artillery hit the Cửa Việt Base's fuel farm destroying 40,000 gallons of petroleum.

During the last week of April the Navy's Task Force Clearwater received intelligence that the PAVN planned to block the Cửa Việt River again.

=== Battle of Dai Do ===
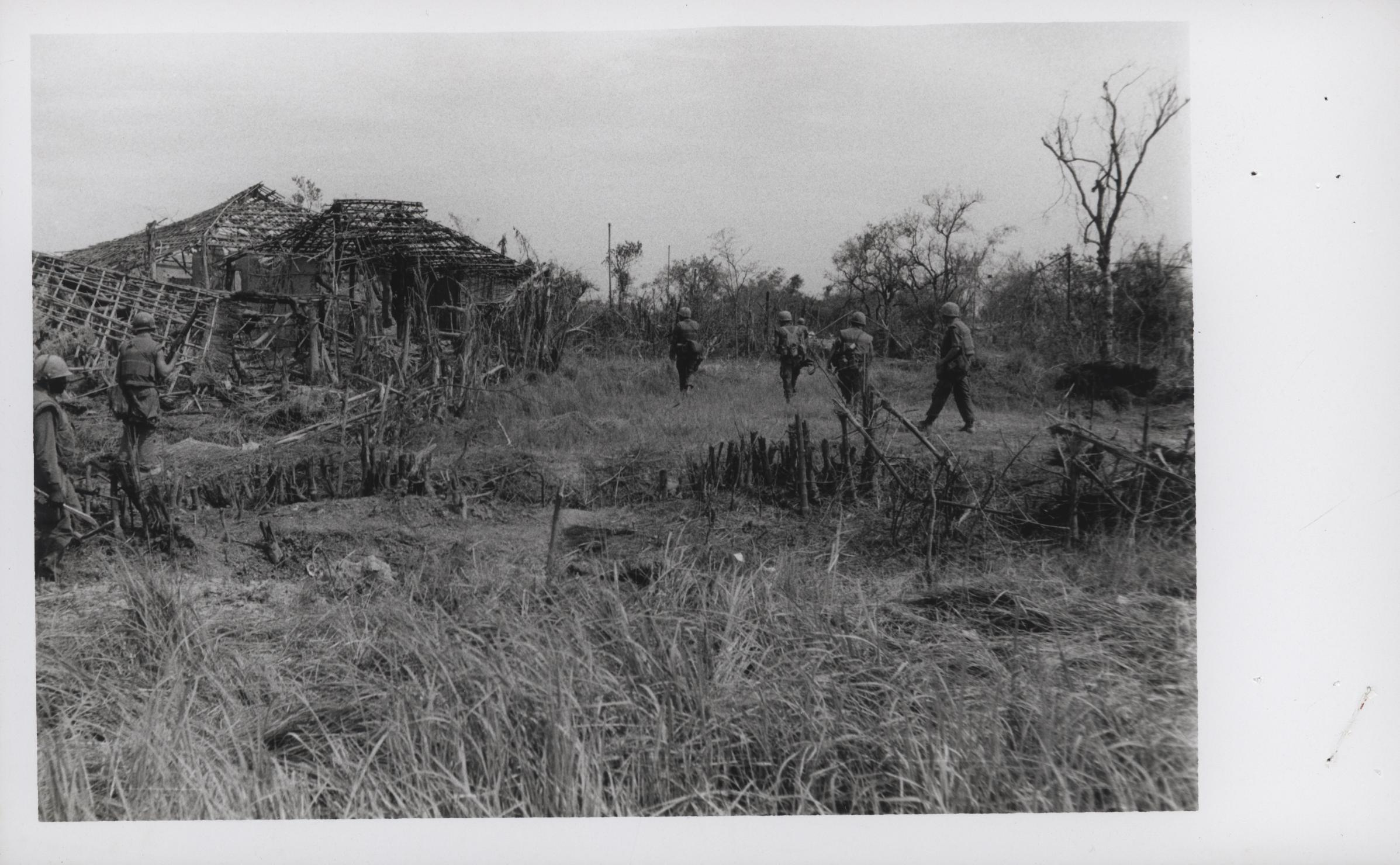
2/4 Marines search Dai Do village, May 1968

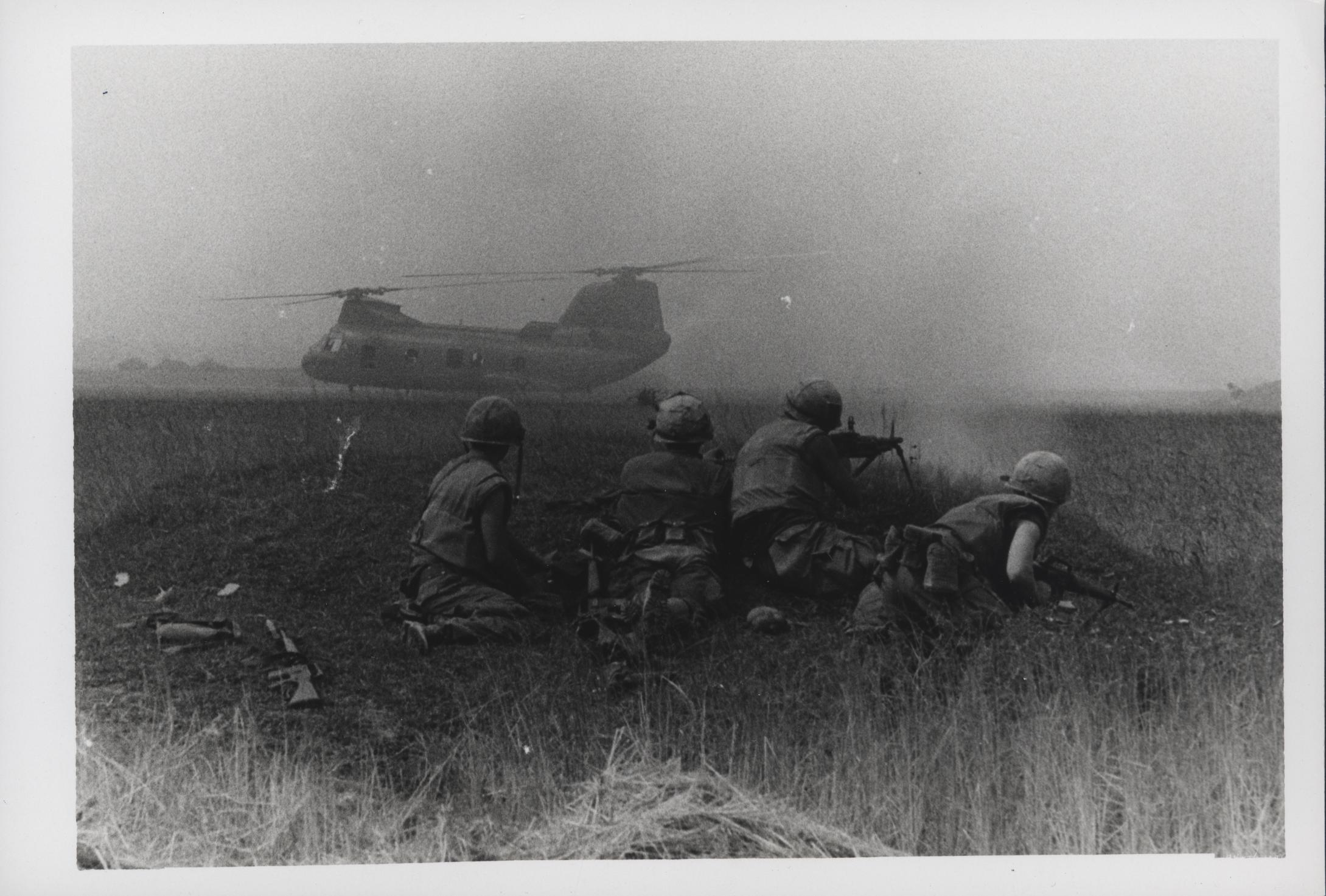
Marines provide machine gun cover for a CH-46 near Đông Hà, 5 May 1968

In late April four PAVN Battalions, including 2 from the 320th Division, infiltrated past the ARVN 2nd Regiment to occupy the area around Dai Do (16.841°N 107.111°E). The PAVN moved into a series of pre-built mutually supporting bunkers surrounded by barbed wire which had been built over the preceding weeks unnoticed by the ARVN who were responsible for security in the area.

At 03:30 on 30 April PAVN in the hamlet of An Loc (16.838°N 107.120°E) fired on a Navy PBR, which returned fire and then returned to Đông Hà Base. At 04:00 the PAVN opened fire on an LCU causing severe damage and killing one sailor. At 07:00 a patrol from Company H 2/4 Marines operating north of Dai Do was sent to investigate the area and was heavily engaged by the PAVN. Additional companies from 2/4 and 1/3 Marines joined the action throughout the day. Marines losses for the day were 16 dead while PAVN losses were 90 dead.

The 2/4 Marines commander Lt. Col. William Weise felt that inadequate resources were provided for the attack on Dai Do, both in terms of men and air and artillery support. Tompkins could not be sure whether this was the main thrust of the May Offensive along the DMZ or a diversion for a larger attack still to come, however by the end of 30 April it was clear that the PAVN intended to either attack Đông Hà Base or move through the area and attack Quảng Trị. With limited Marine reserves available, Tompkins requested Army reinforcements from I Field Force commander LG William B. Rosson who sent the 3rd Battalion, 21st Infantry Regiment to a landing zone north of Đông Hà on the morning of 1 May.

Intense combat took place from 1–2 May around Dai Do with the Marines losing a further 64 killed and the PAVN over 470 killed.

On the morning of 3 May the PAVN had largely abandoned the Dai Do area. The Marines had lost 81 killed in the battle while the PAVN had lost at least 600 killed. Company E commander Captain James E. Livingston and Company G commander Captain Jay R. Vargas were each awarded the Medal of Honor for their actions during the battle, while 2/4 Marines commander Weise was awarded the Navy Cross. The ARVN had lost 5 dead and killed 39 PAVN.

=== May–October ===
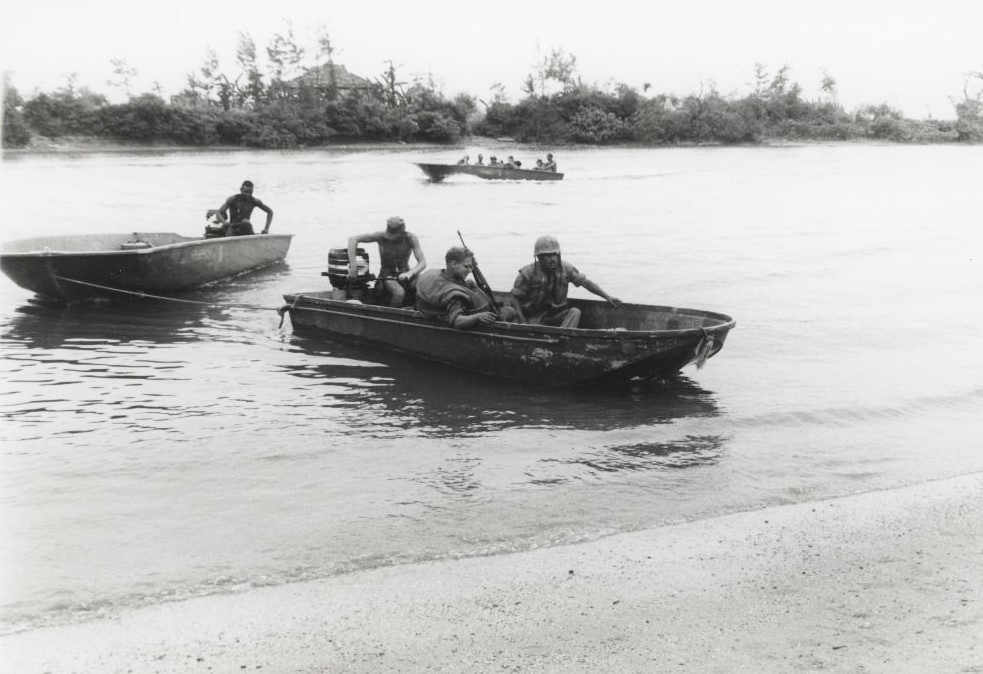
2/4 Marines patrol the Cửa Việt River near Dong Ha, 8 May 1968

While fighting continued around Dai Do, the 3/21st Infantry occupied Lam Xuan taking over from Company G 2/4 Marines. On the afternoon of 2 May as the 3/21st patrolled north of Lam Xuan they were ambushed by the PAVN near the hamlet of Nhi Ha (16.908°N 107.13°E) losing nine dead and four missing. They withdrew to Lam Xuan and called in artillery strikes on the ambush site. On the morning of 3 May the 3/21st returned to the Nhi Ha and recovered their missing and were then hit by three PAVN attacks forcing them to withdraw to Lam Xuan. Marine airstrikes were called in and one Marine F-8 Crusader was shot down and its pilot killed. 3/21st Infantry losses for 3 May were one killed while PAVN losses were 67 killed. On 4 May the 3/21st attacked Nhi Ha again and were once more forced to retreat to Lam Xuan. On the morning of 5 May 3/21st assaulted Nhi Ha again but found that the PAVN had abandoned their positions leaving 64 dead. Total Army losses were 16 dead while PAVN losses were estimated at more than 200.

On the morning of 5 May 1/3 Marines advanced from Thuong Do northwest to Truc Kinh (16.86°N 107.106°E) while the ARVN 2nd Regiment advanced on the opposite bank of the stream to the west. At 11:30 Companies C and D reached the hamlet of Som Soi 300m southeast of Truc Kinh when they were stopped by heavy PAVN fire. At 12:50 the PAVN counterattacked hitting Company D on the east flank and Company C swung to the right to attack the PAVN while Company B moved up from Thuong Do. This manoeuvre exposed the Marines left flank as the ARVN advance had been stalled and the PAVN quickly moved to exploit this gap. An aerial observer alerted the 1/3 Marines commander and Companies I and M 3rd Battalion, 4th Marines landed by helicopter at Thuong Do and moved forward into positions south of Truc Kinh forcing the PAVN to withdraw. On the morning of 6 May Companies C and D resumed their advance and by early afternoon had occupied Truc Kinh meeting minimal resistance. Marine losses over the two day engagement were 15 dead while 173 PAVN had been killed and three captured along with 75 rifles and 19 heavy weapons.

On 6 May northwest of Nhi Ha the PAVN ambushed a patrol of Company A, 3/21st Infantry losing five dead and 14 missing. The 3/21st retreated to Nhi Ha with air and artillery support and two of the missing men rejoined the unit. The following day Company A returned to the ambush site and recovered a further 11 of its missing soldiers. Later that day Tompkins requested of Rosson that the 2nd Brigade, 1st Cavalry Division be redeployed from the Scotland II operational area around Khe Sanh Combat Base into the Napoleon/Saline area. At 17:15 the 1st Battalion, 5th Cavalry Regiment began landing 3 km east of Truc Kinh and swept to the northeast on 7 and 8 May. On 9 May the 2nd Brigade headquarters arrived and took control of the Dai Do area under Operation Concordia Square which ran until 17 May following which the 2nd Brigade returned to Camp Evans.

On 25 May Company E 2/4 Marines engaged a battalion sized PAVN force near Nhi Ha. Company H was lifted into blocking positions south of Nhi Ha while Company E attacked from the north. The day-long battle resulted in 18 Marines and 238 PAVN killed. Meanwhile, near Thuong Nghia the 2nd ARVN Regiment engaged another PAVN battalion killing 122 PAVN. On 26 May MG Raymond G. Davis who had assumed command of the 3rd Marine Division from Tompkins on 21 May, ordered the 1st Battalion, 9th Marines and the 2nd Battalion, 9th Marines to be landed at Nhi Ha and for the 3/3 Marines and the 3rd Battalion, 9th Marines to move overland to Dai Do.

At 13:00 on 26 May 3/9 Marines engaged a 100 strong PAVN force near Truc Kinh killing 56 and capturing five for the loss of ten Marines. At 16:30 Company K 3/3 Marines was engaged by a PAVN force near Truc Kinh, while air support destroyed a PAVN column moving to support the attack on Company K, the company lost 5 missing. The ARVN operating around Thuong Nghia killed 110 PAVN while losing two killed. On 27 May the Marines occupied Truc Kinh recovering the bodies of the five missing Marines, PAVN losses during the day were 28 killed. Over the next two days the Marines and ARVN swept the area capturing 18 PAVN soldiers. Total losses were 41 Marine, 19 ARVN and 545 PAVN dead.

Also on 26 May at the hamlet of Lai An (16.924°N 107.1063°E) 2.5 km northwest of Nhi Ha the Marines surrounded a PAVN battalion. The Marines gradually tightened their cordon and overran Lai An by 30 May killing 90 PAVN and capturing eight for the loss of 20 Marines killed.

The PAVN had suffered severe losses in their May Offensive attacks along the DMZ and the 320th Division was not seen in action for the following two months.

Throughout June the PAVN generally avoided contact with the Marines apart from some small ambushes. PAVN artillery hit the Cửa Việt Base on 21 and 24 June destroying an ammunition dump. On 25 June the 3rd Marine Regiment assumed responsibility for the eastern part of Leatherneck Square.

On 2 July, in conjunction with the Operation Thor air and naval gunfire strikes on PAVN artillery positions north of the DMZ, the 1st and 2nd Battalions, 3rd Marines attacked PAVN position north of Lam Xuan. On 4 July Company C, 1/3 Marines engaged a PAVN force in the ruins of Lai An, establishing a cordon around the area, air and artillery support was called in and on 6 July when the Marines occupied the area they found 134 PAVN dead. On 7 July the Marines overran a PAVN company in the hamlet of Tai Nu 1 km north of Lai An killing 42 PAVN and capturing 23 weapons. 2/3 Marines operating on the right flank overran a PAVN force in the hamlet of An May killing 20 PAVN for the loss of three Marines. On 8 July the two battalions began to withdraw and on 9 July the 3rd Marine Regiment handed control of the Napoleon/Saline sector to the 1st Marine Regiment.

On 22 July a Company H patrol ambushed a Viet Cong (VC) unit southeast of Cửa Việt Base killing ten VC.

On 2 August PAVN forces attacked Ocean View Air Naval Gunfire Liaison Company (ANGLICO) observation post but were driven off by fire from the AMTRACs, M42 Dusters and naval gunfire killing 8 PAVN. Later that day a platoon of PAVN was seen moving nearby and naval gunfire was again called in, resulting in a further 2 PAVN killed.

On 8 August the ARVN 2nd Regiment engaged a PAVN force from the 1st Battalion, 138th Regiment 2 km east of Gio Linh killing over 100 and forcing them to withdraw towards the DMZ.

On the morning of 15 August the ARVN 2nd Regiment and the 11th Armored Cavalry Regiment, supported by Company A, 1st AMTRAC Battalion with 15 LVTs and 2 M48s launched an assault into the southern DMZ which resulted in a reported 421 PAVN killed.

On 21 August, the 1st Marine Regiment handed over responsibility for the Napoleon/Saline area of operations to the 1st Brigade, 5th Infantry Division (Mechanized), which also assumed control of the Kentucky operational area, while the 1st AMTRAC Battalion remained responsible for the defense of the Cửa Việt Base, strongpoint C-4 and Ocean View.

From 17 to 19 October BLT 2nd Battalion, 26th Marines conducted a security operation in the Xuan Khanh Resttlement Area and then a sweep north from Ocean View to the DMZ uncovering numerous mines and booby-traps. On 23 October the ARVN 2nd Regiment supported by Company H, 9th Marines and a tank platoon from Company A, 3rd Tank Battalion launched a raid into the DMZ north of Ha Loi Trung (16.966°N 107.136°E), resulting in 112 PAVN killed.

=== Napoleon/Saline II ===
On 1 November 1/5th Infantry (Mechanized) was moved to Quảng Trị Combat Base and the given responsibility for the Quảng Trị area including the Napoleon/Saline area which was now redesignated Area of Operations Green. This expanded area of operations was designated Napoleon/Saline II. Within the Napoleon/Saline area the 1st AMTRAC Battalion remained responsible for security of the Cửa Việt Base.

== Aftermath ==
Operation Napoleon/Saline concluded on 9 December 1968. The Napoleon/Saline area was absorbed into the Kentucky operational area under the control of Marine Task Force Bravo and the 1/5th Infantry (Mechanized) commenced Operation Marshall Mountain around Quảng Trị. U.S. and ARVN losses were 395 killed while the US/ARVN claimed that PAVN losses exceeded 3500 killed.
