= Battle of Cửa Việt =

Part of the Vietnam War (1973)

- Part of the Vietnam War
| Date | January 25–31, 1973 |
| Location | Cửa Việt Port 16°54′N 107°11′E; Quảng Trị Province, Vietnam |
| Result | North Vietnamese victory |

Belligerents
| North Vietnam | South Vietnam; United States (until 28 January) |

Commanders and leaders
| Lê Trọng Tấn; Cao Van Khanh | (South Vietnam) Ngô Quang Trưởng (South Vietnam) Nguyen Thanh Tri |

Casualties and losses
| South Vietnamese claim: 1,000 casualties | (South Vietnam) 26 armored vehicles destroyed (27 January); 40 killed, 20 armored vehicles destroyed (between 28–31 January); 2 aircraft shotdown (United States) 3 killed 2 aircraft shotdown North Vietnamese claim: 2,330 killed and wounded, 200 captured 113 tanks and APCs destroyed 12 tanks and APCs captured |

Battle of Cửa Việt took place during the Vietnam War between 25–31 January 1973 at the Cửa Việt naval base and its vicinity, in northeast Quảng Trị Province. The battle involved a combined task force of South Vietnamese Marine and armored units that tried to gain a foothold at the Cua Viet Port just as the ceasefire was about to take effect on January 28 in accordance with the Paris Peace Accords. The South Vietnamese forces were finally forced to retreat by a North Vietnamese counterattack with considerable losses on both sides.

== Background ==
In late October 1972 as part of the counteroffensive to the Easter Offensive launched by the People's Army of Vietnam (PAVN), the Army of the Republic of Vietnam (ARVN) began attacks north of Quảng Trị to try to regain positions along the south bank of the Cam Lộ/Cửa Việt River. The attacks were met with stiff PAVN resistance and were stopped at the Thạch Hãn River. A further attack from the coast by the Vietnamese Marines in November made limited gains. By the end of 1972 the Marines and ARVN occupied positions 5 km south of the river. As the ongoing peace negotiations would soon lead to a ceasefire, the South Vietnamese Joint General Staff sought the most advantageous battlefield positions possible and so ordered a further effort to regain the south bank of the Cam Lộ/Cửa Việt River.

== Opposing forces ==
Since March 1972, the Cửa Việt base had been controlled by PAVN, particularly the 5th Regiment of the People's Navy of Vietnam.

On 15 January 1973 planning began for a final assault on Cửa Việt . A special combined unit called Task Force Tango was organized, consisting of the 3rd, 4th and 5th Marine Battalions and elements of the 1st Armored Brigade. The task force was put under the command of Colonel Nguyen Thanh Tri, Deputy Commander of the Republic of Vietnam Marine Division.

== Battle ==
The operation began at 06:55 on 26 January with Task Force Tango advancing in two columns. Besides ARVN firepower, U.S. and naval gunfire of the United States Seventh Fleet was used to soften the target and hinder PAVN reinforcements. The PAVN put up fierce resistance to the attack, destroying 26 M-48s and M-113s with AT-3 missiles and shooting down two Republic of Vietnam Air Force planes with SA-7 missiles.

On 27 January an F-4 Phantom II of VF-143 was shot down while attacking PAVN forces north of Cửa Việt. Both crewmen ejected, the radar intercept officer (RIO) was captured and released on 27 March during Operation Homecoming, while the pilot Commander Harley Hall was killed. His remains were identified on 6 September 1994. An OV-10 Bronco #68-3806, call sign Nail 89 of the 23rd Tactical Air Support Squadron acting as forward air controller for the attempted rescue of the F-4 crew was hit by an SA-7 missile, both crewmen ejected and radio contact was established with one of them who said he was about to be captured. Neither crewman was returned during Operation Homecoming and both are listed as presumptive finding of death.

At 01:45 on 28 January the Marines made a final assault and by 07:00 had broken through the PAVN lines to recapture the base. At 07:45 the USS Turner Joy, one of the two destroyers involved in the Gulf of Tonkin Incident in August 1964, fired the last U.S. naval gunfire support in the Vietnam War and pulled off the gun line. At 08:00 in accordance with the Paris Peace Accords the ceasefire came into effect and the U.S. stopped all support for Task Force Tango. On the evening of 29 January, the PAVN launched a counterattack against Task Force Tango, and by the next day had succeeded in cutting off its lines of communication and began bombarding the encircled Marines. A Republic of Vietnam Navy LCM was destroyed as it tried to resupply the Marines. The Marines attempted to break out on the early morning of 31 January and the PAVN recaptured the base.

== Aftermath ==
South Vietnamese losses were recorded as 40 killed and 20 armored vehicles destroyed in the battle between 28–31 January.
