= Operation Thor =

Part of the Vietnam War (1968)

Coordinates: 17.048°N 107.061°E

- Part of the Vietnam War
Date	1–8 July 1968
Location	around Mũi Lay, North Vietnam
Result	U.S. claims operational success

Belligerents
United States	North Vietnam

Commanders and leaders
General Creighton Abrams; LG Richard G. Stilwell; MG Raymond G. Davis	

Casualties and losses
1 killed 3 aircraft shot down	US body count: 125 killed 63 infantry weapons destroyed 19 artillery guns destroyed 2 SAM launchers destroyed

Operation Thor was a U.S. combined arms operation against People's Army of Vietnam (PAVN) positions around, Mũi Lay, North Vietnam from 1–8 July 1968.

== Background ==
On 24 March 1968 3rd Marine Division commander MG Rathvon M. Tompkins proposed a combined arms operation against the area around Mũi Lay to reduce PAVN infiltration and destroy artillery that had been targeting the Cửa Việt and Đông Hà bases and supporting PAVN infantry operations south of the Vietnamese Demilitarized Zone (DMZ). The operational area would extend from the southern edge of the DMZ 14km north to Mũi Lay and 25km inland from the coast. The plan was submitted to III Amphibious Force (III MAF) and then to LG Richard G. Stilwell's Provisional Corps and then MACV for approval. On 21 June, after consulting with representatives from III MAF, 7th Fleet and 7th Air Force, COMUSMACV General Creighton Abrams approved the plan with a start date of 1 July.

On 28 June reconnaissance aircraft from VMCJ-1 and the 7th Fleet began photo-reconnaissance of the target area and these were then used by Provisional Corps to develop the target lists. Five Marine artillery batteries moved east along Route 9 to new firing positions south of the DMZ, while large quantities of ammunition were brought in to support the artillery.

== Operation ==
On 1 July the 7th Air Force controlled bombing campaign began and 114 B-52 sorties and 664 Air Force, Marine and Navy attack aircraft sorties delivered over 4000 tons of bombs on the target area over two days.

On 3 July, 61 guns from 13 Marine and Army artillery batteries and two Navy cruisers and six destroyers began the artillery bombardment of the target area together with the ongoing airstrikes, delivering over 12,000 rounds on the first day. The North Vietnamese appeared to be unprepared for the assault with Navy ships able to approach to within 10km of the coast without provoking PAVN shore batteries.

By 5 July antiaircraft fire had been so reduced in the target area that O-1 artillery observation aircraft were able to operate over the area without sustaining any hits.

By 6–7 July the Marine/Army artillery was firing approximately 4000 rounds into the target area, while the Navy was firing approximately 3000 rounds and the air elements were dropping over 2000 tons of bombs.

== Aftermath ==
On 8 July the artillery began to return to their pre-operation positions and control over the target sector returned to the 7th Air Force. The operation was regarded as a success due as it was followed by a sharp decline in artillery fire across the DMZ and reduced antiaircraft fire from the target area.

179 artillery positions containing 19 guns, 789 anti-aircraft sites containing 63 weapons, 143 bunkers and storage areas were destroyed, including two SAM-2 sites. 352 secondary explosions and 236 secondary fires were observed. PAVN personnel losses were estimated at 125 dead.

In over 2000 sorties B-52s had dropped a total of 5156 tons of bombs while Air Force, Marine and Navy attack aircraft dropped a total of 3207 tons with three aircraft shot down and one crewman killed. Marine/Army units fired 23,187 rounds of 155mm, 175mm and 8in artillery. Navy ships fired 19,022 rounds of 5in, 6in and 8in artillery.
