= William Weise =

United States Marine Corps general

- Born: 10 March 1929; Philadelphia, Pennsylvania, U.S.
- Died: 11 March 2025 (aged 96); Fairfax, Virginia, U.S.
- Military career
- Allegiance: United States of America
- Branch: United States Marine Corps
- Service years: 1951-1982
- Rank: Brigadier General
- Nickname: Wild Bill
- Commands: 2nd Battalion, 4th Marines
- Conflicts: Vietnam War: Tet Offensive; Operation Napoleon/Saline; Battle of Dai Do
- Awards: Navy Cross; Silver Star; Legion of Merit (2); Purple Heart (3); Vietnamese Cross of Gallantry

William Weise (10 March 1929 – 11 March 2025) was a United States Marine Corps Brigadier General who served in the Vietnam War.

== Early life and education ==
Weise was born in south Philadelphia and graduated from Temple University. He enlisted in the Marine Corps in 1951 in order to use the GI Bill to attend law school.

== Military career ==
=== Vietnam War ===
Lt.Col. Weise assumed command of the 2nd Battalion, 4th Marines in October 1967 and commanded them during Operation Napoleon/Saline and at the Battle of Dai Do where he was seriously injured. For his actions at Dai Do Weise was awarded the Navy Cross.

=== Post-Vietnam ===
Weise retired from the Marine Corps in 1982 after 31 years of service.

In his role as co-chair of the Marine Corps Heritage Center committee he assisted with the funding and creation of the National Museum of the Marine Corps which opened in 2006.
