= Thạch Hãn River =

Coordinates: 16°51′35″N 107°7′50″E

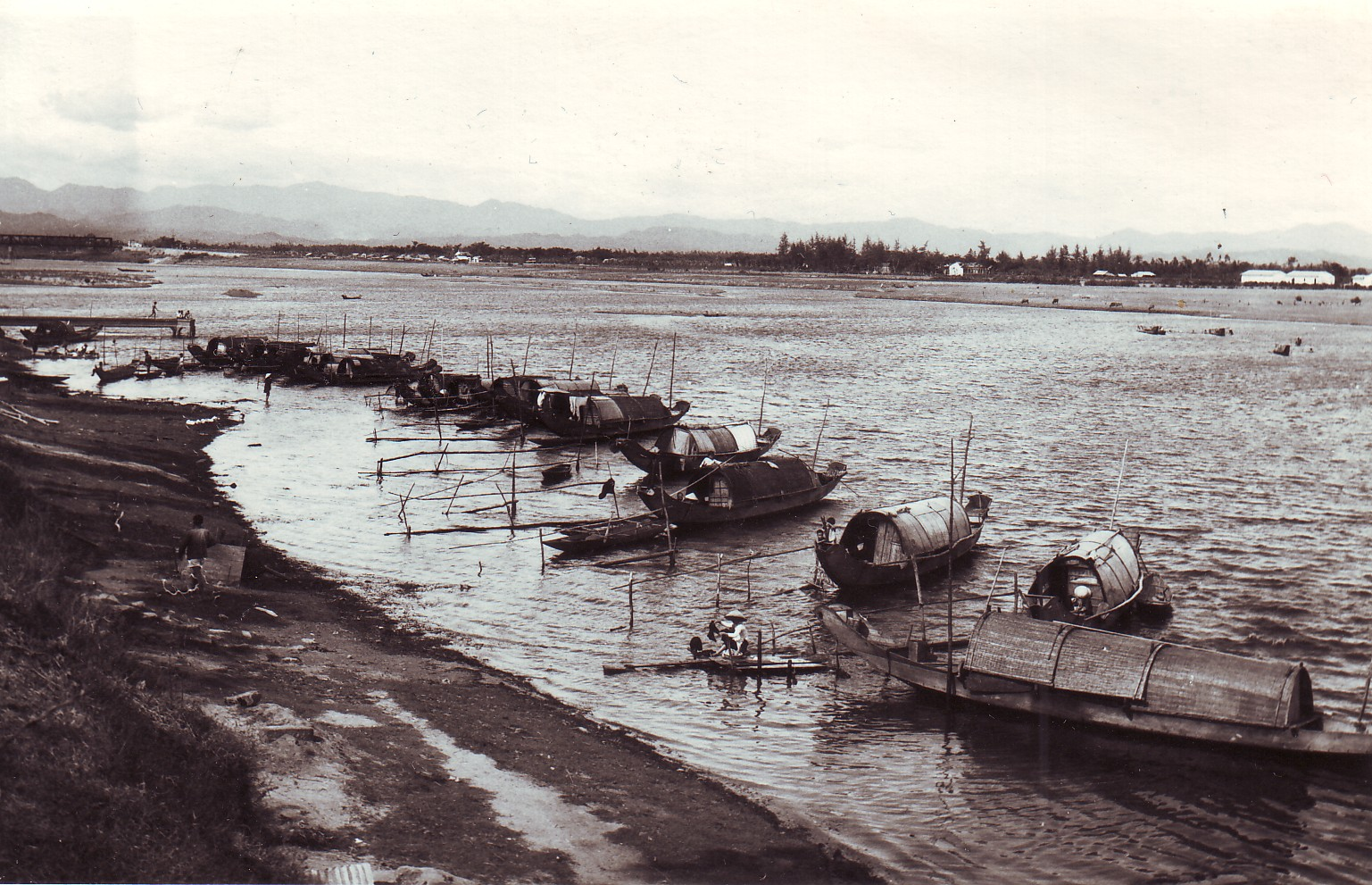
- Sampans along the Thạch Hãn River in August 1967

Location
- Country: Vietnam

Physical characteristics
- Source
  - location: Annamite Mountains
- Mouth
  - location: South China Sea
  - elevation: 0 m (0 ft)
- Length: 170 km (110 mi)

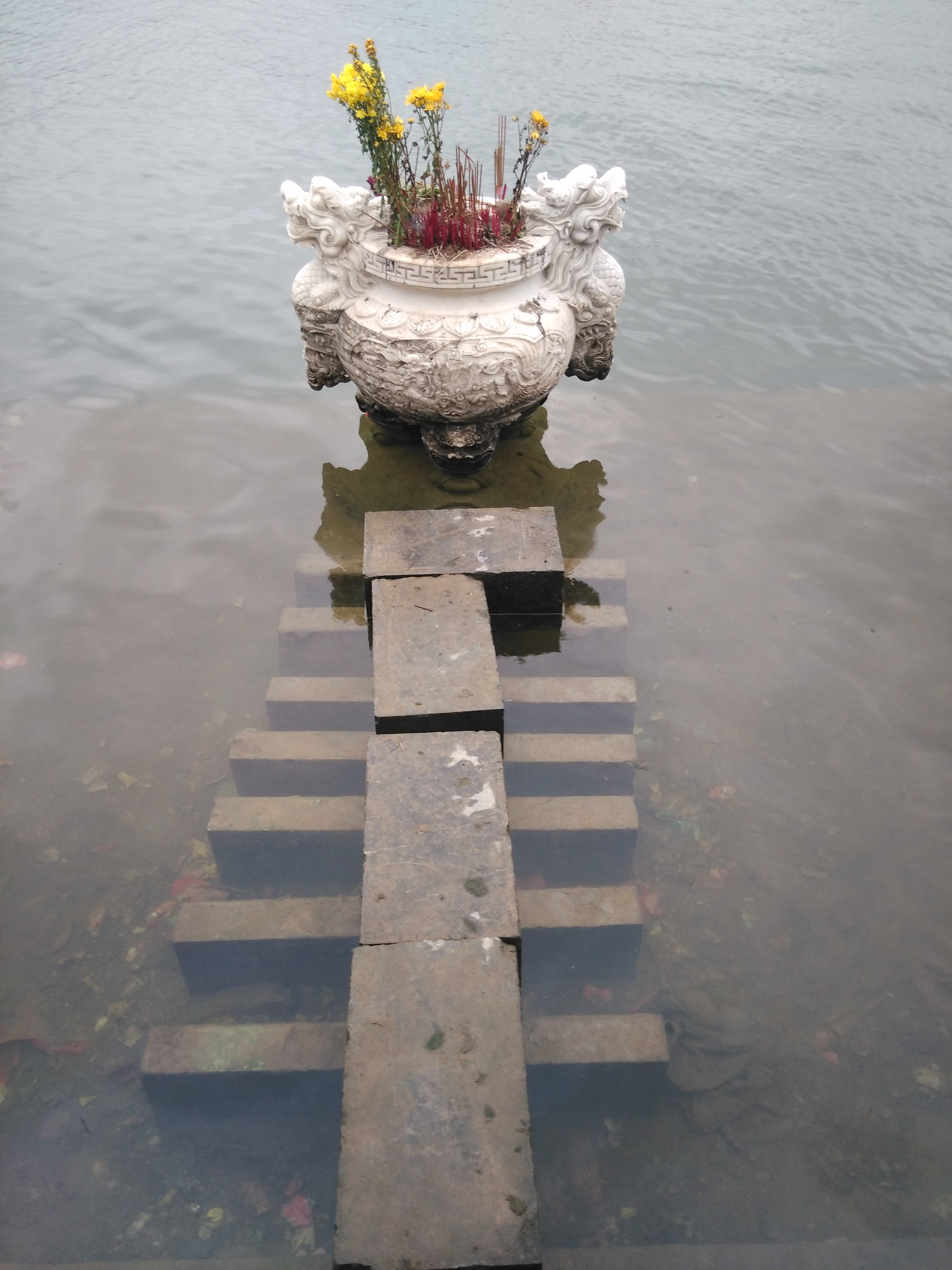
Incense censer to burn incense for martyrs on the banks of Thạch Hãn River

The Thạch Hãn River is a river in Quảng Trị province, Vietnam. It rises in the Annamite Mountains, and enters the South China Sea east of Đông Hà. It is approximately 270 kilometres (170 mi) long, with two main tributaries and with several branches to the sea.

== Tributaries ==
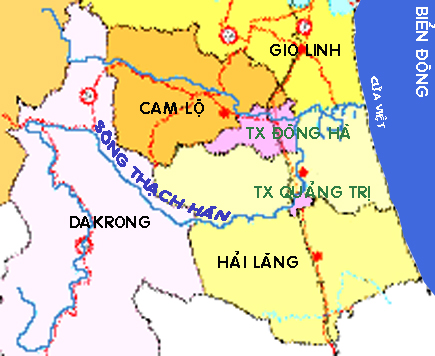
Map of Quang Tri province, showing Thach Han river.

The Thạch Hãn river is formed by the confluence of two rivers which rise in the western highlands of Vietnam; the Đakrông, which flows from the south-west through Đa Krông District, and the Rào Quán, which rises in the mountains north of Khe Sanh.

In the plains the river is joined by three main left bank tributaries; the Ái Tử, the Vĩnh Phước, and the Hiếu, known in its upper reaches as the Cam Lộ. The river enters the sea at Cửa Việt, east of Đông Hà city.

The Thạch Hãn is also connected by distributaries to the Bến Hải River to the north, marking what used to be the Demilitarized Zone, and the Ô Lâu to the south, which reaches the sea at the Tam Giang lagoon.
