= Jay R. Vargas =

United States Marine Corps Medal of Honor recipient

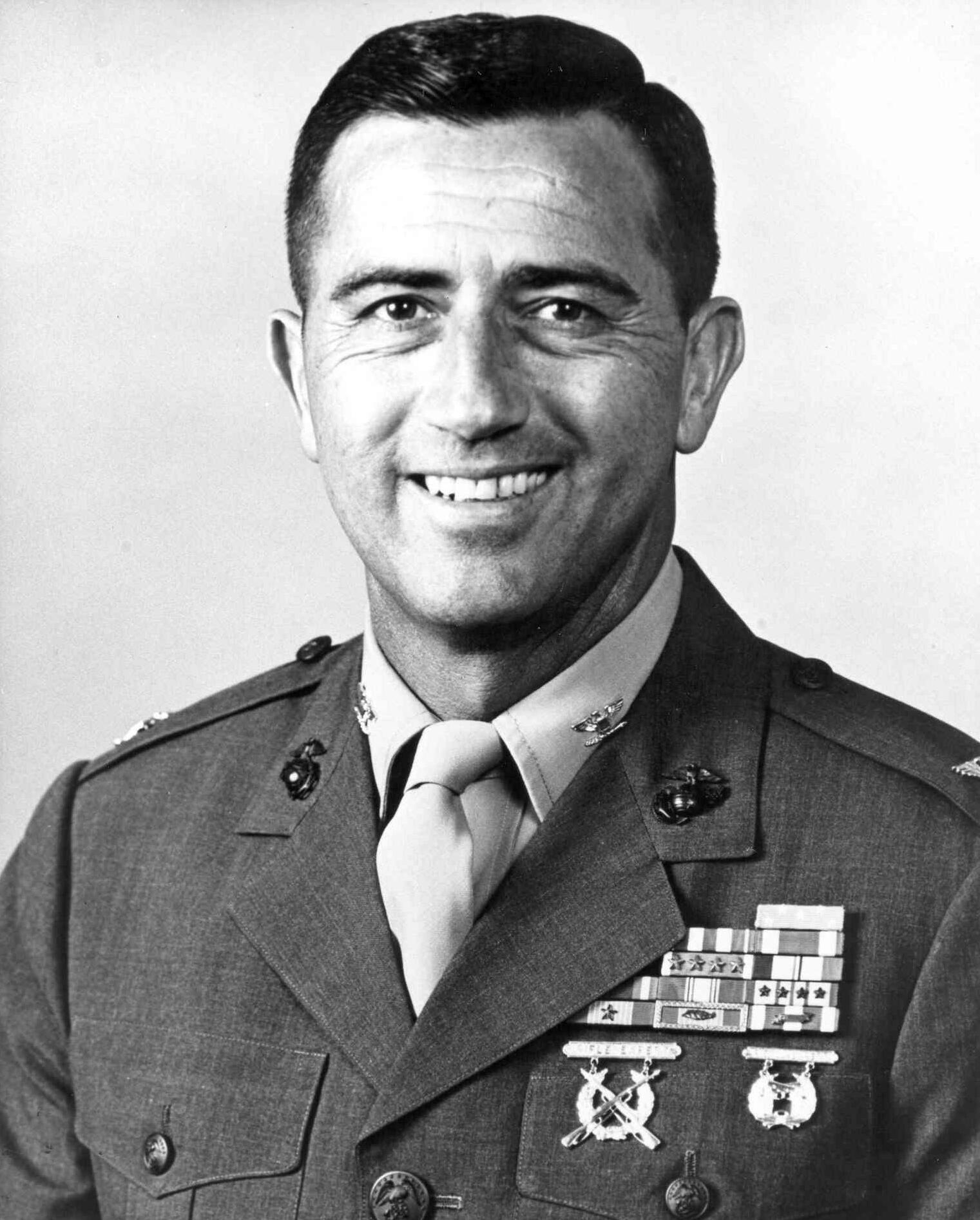
- Jay R. Vargas
- Born: July 29, 1938 (age 88); Winslow, Arizona, U.S.
- Military career
- Allegiance: United States
- Branch: United States Marine Corps
- Service years: 1963–1992
- Rank: Colonel
- Unit: 2nd Battalion 4th Marines
- Commands: 3rd Reconnaissance Battalion
- Conflicts: Vietnam War: Battle of Dai Do
- Awards: Medal of Honor; Silver Star; Purple Heart (5); Meritorious Service Medal
- Other work: Department of Veterans Affairs

Jay R. Vargas (born July 29, 1938) is a retired United States Marine Corps colonel who served in the Vietnam War. He received the Medal of Honor for "conspicuous gallantry and intrepidity at the risk of his life above and beyond the call of duty" in 1968.

Vargas is one of four brothers who has served in combat in the United States Armed Forces in time of war – World War II, the Korean War, and the Vietnam War.

== Education ==
Vargas attended high school in Winslow, Arizona, where he was born. He graduated from Northern Arizona University in 1962 with a B.S. Degree in education and completed a Master of Arts degree with "Honors" at U.S International University in San Diego, California.

== Marine Corps career ==
After completing The Basic School at Marine Corps Base Quantico, Virginia, in June 1963, Vargas was assigned to the 1st Battalion, 5th Marines, 1st Marine Division. For his actions in the Battle of Dai Do, Republic of Vietnam in 1968 as a captain, Vargas was awarded the Medal of Honor by President Richard M. Nixon in a May 1970 ceremony at the White House. He is also a graduate of the Amphibious Warfare School, the Command and Staff College, Quantico, Virginia, and the National War College, Washington, D.C.

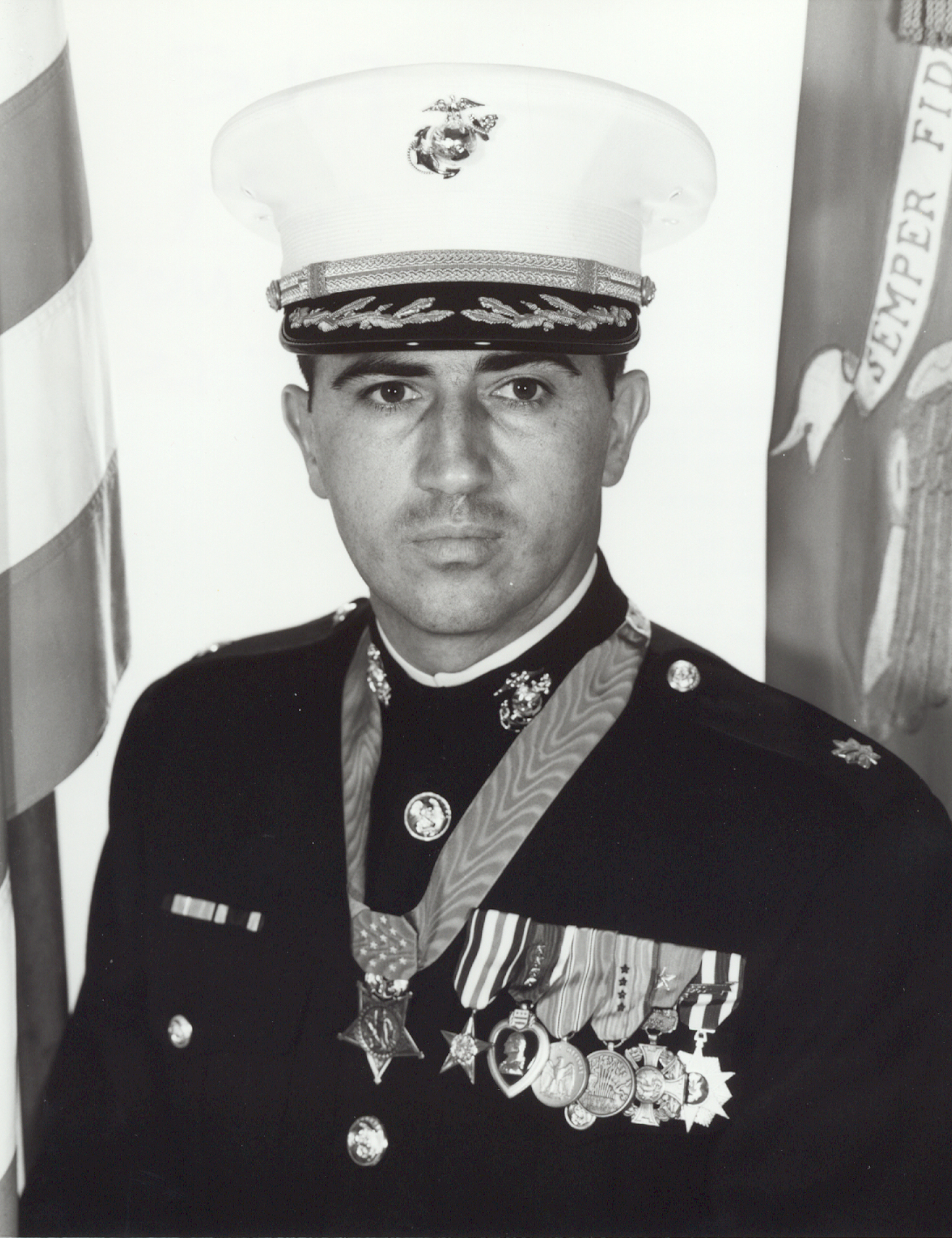
Lieutenant Colonel Jay Vargas with Medal of Honor

Vargas served as a weapons and rifle platoon commander; rifle company executive officer; three times as a rifle company commander (two of which were in combat); S-3 operations officer; recruit depot series commander; instructor, Staff Planning School, LFTCPAC; headquarters company commander, 3rd Marine Division; commanding officer and executive officer, 3rd Reconnaissance Battalion, 3rd Marine Division; commanding officer of the 7th Marine Regiment at Camp Pendleton from 10 August 1984 to 29 May 1986; aide-de-camp to the deputy commanding general, Fleet Marine Force, Pacific; Marine officer instructor, NROTC Unit, University of New Mexico; head, Operations Branch, Headquarters Marine Corps, Washington, D.C.; and as the assistant chief of staff, G-4, 1st Marine Amphibious Force.

After almost thirty years of service, Vargas retired from the Marine Corps in 1992 as a colonel.

== Medal of Honor ==
Medal of Honor citation:

The President of the United States in the name of The Congress takes pleasure in presenting the MEDAL OF HONOR to

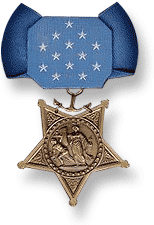

MAJOR JAY R. VARGAS
UNITED STATES MARINE CORPS

for service as set forth in the following CITATION:

For conspicuous gallantry and intrepidity at the risk of his life above and beyond the call of duty while serving as Commanding Officer, Company G, Second Battalion, Fourth Marines, Ninth Marine Amphibious Brigade in action against enemy forces in the Republic of Vietnam from 30 April to 2 May 1968. On 1 May 1968, though suffering from wounds he had incurred while relocating his unit under heavy enemy fire the preceding day, Major (then Captain) Vargas combined Company G with two other companies and led his men in an attack on the fortified village of Dai Do. Exercising expert leadership, he maneuvered his Marines across 700 meters of open rice paddy while under intense enemy mortar, rocket and artillery fire and obtained a foothold in two hedgerows on the enemy perimeter, only to have elements of his company become pinned down by the intense enemy fire. Leading his reserve platoon to the aid of his beleaguered men, Major Vargas inspired his men to renew their relentless advance, while destroying a number of enemy bunkers. Again wounded by grenade fragments, he refused aid as he moved about the hazardous area reorganizing his unit into a strong defense perimeter at the edge of the village. Shortly after the objective was secured, the enemy commenced a series of counterattacks and probes which lasted throughout the night but were unsuccessful as the gallant defenders of Company G stood firm in their hard-won enclave. Reinforced the following morning, the Marines launched a renewed assault through Dai Do on the village of Dinh To, to which the enemy retaliated with a massive counterattack resulting in hand-to-hand combat. Major Vargas remained in the open, encouraging and rendering assistance to his Marines when he was hit for the third time in the three-day battle. Observing his battalion commander sustain a serious wound, he disregarded his excruciating pain, crossed the fire-swept area and carried his commander to a covered position, then resumed supervising and encouraging his men simultaneously assisting in organizing the battalion's perimeter defense. His gallant actions uphold the highest traditions of the Marines Corps and the United States Naval Service.

/S/ RICHARD M. NIXON

== Later years ==
After leaving the military, Vargas, a Republican, served as the Secretary of the California Department of Veterans Affairs from 1993 to 1998. On July 9, 2001, he was appointed to the position of Regional Veterans Liaison for the United States Department of Veterans Affairs by the Secretary of Veterans Affairs, Anthony J. Principi. He served in this position until January 2009.

== Family ==
Jay Vargas—the son of an Italian mother and Hispanic father who came to the United States in 1917—is one of four brothers who has served in the United States Armed Forces in time of war. Like Vargas, each of his brothers are decorated veterans — Angelo served at Iwo Jima in World War II; Frank fought on Okinawa in World War II; and Joseph served in the Korean War. In honor of his mother, Vargas had her name engraved on his Medal of Honor. She died before he received his Medal of Honor; he requested that her name be engraved on the medal and be added to the rolls. As such, the actual recorded recipient of this Medal of Honor is "VARGAS, M. Sando."

== Military awards ==
Vargas' military decorations and awards include:

1st Row	Medal of Honor		
2nd Row	Silver Star	Purple Heart w/ four 5/16" gold stars	Meritorious Service Medal
3rd Row	Combat Action Ribbon	Navy Unit Commendation	National Defense Service Medal w/ one 3/16" bronze star
4th Row	Vietnam Service Medal w/ four 3/16" bronze stars	Republic of Vietnam Gallantry Cross w/ Silver Star and Palm	Republic of Vietnam Campaign Medal w/ 1960- device

== See also ==
- List of Medal of Honor recipients for the Vietnam War
- List of Hispanic Medal of Honor recipients
- Hispanics in the United States Marine Corps
