= Combat Assault Battalion =

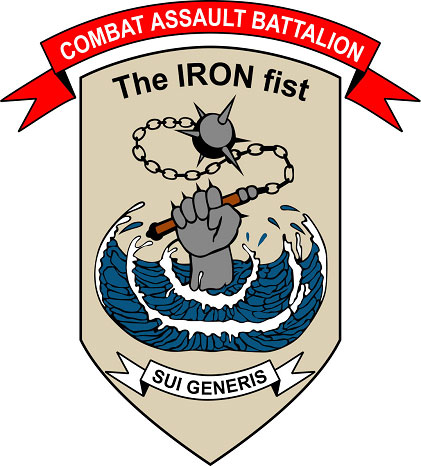
- Combat Assault Battalion's Insignia
- Active: February 16, 1942 – October 12, 2018
- Country: United States of America
- Branch: United States Marine Corps
- Type: Mechanized/Engineering Battalion
- Role: Amphibious Assault
- Part of: 3rd Marine Division; III Marine Expeditionary Force
- Nickname: The Iron Fist
- Motto: "Sui Generis"
- Engagements: World War II; Battle of Guadalcanal; Battle of Finschhafen; Battle of New Britain; Battle of Peleliu; Battle of Okinawa; Korean War; Battle of Inchon; Battle of Chosin Reservoir; Vietnam War; War on terror; Operation Enduring Freedom; Iraq War

Commanders
- Notable commanders: Edwin B. Wheeler

The Combat Assault Battalion was a mechanized battalion of the United States Marine Corps and subordinate element of the 3rd Marine Division and the III Marine Expeditionary Force. The unit was last based at Camp Schwab, Okinawa, Japan.

== Mission ==
To conduct Amphibious Assault, Light Armored Reconnaissance and Combat Engineer operations across the Range of Military Operations (ROMO) in the Pacific Area of Responsibility (AOR) in support of MAGTF expeditionary operations.

== Subordinate units ==
- Headquarters and Services Company
- Combat Engineer Company
- Light Armored Reconnaissance Company
- Assault Amphibian Vehicle Company

== History ==
=== World War II ===
The 1st Amphibian Tractor Battalion was activated February 16, 1942 at New River, North Carolina as part of the 1st Marine Division. The battalion relocated in May 1942 to Wellington, New Zealand and participated in the following World War II campaigns:

- Guadalcanal
- Finschhafen
- New Britain
- Peleliu
- Okinawa

The battalion was decommissioned on November 17, 1945, at Marine Corps Base Camp Pendleton, California. Less than a year later that battalion was reactivated on May 1, 1946, at MCB Camp Pendleton

=== Korean War ===
The battalion participated in the Korean War from the Pusan Perimeter in operations from Inchon to Seoul, Chosin Reservoir, East to Central Front, and the Western Front. Following the war they participated in the defense of the Korean Demilitarized Zone from August 1953 to March 1955. They were relocated during March 1955 to Camp McGill, Japan.

=== Vietnam War ===
The battalion was reassigned March 16, 1965 to the 3d Marine Division and relocated to Camp Hansen, Okinawa.

Company A was deployed to South Vietnam on 7 May 1965 and was attached to the 4th Marine Regiment at Chu Lai Base Area. Company B deployed to South Vietnam on 8 July and was attached to the 9th Marine Regiment at Danang. On 16 July 1965 the remainder of the battalion loaded aboard USS Carter Hall for deployment to South Vietnam, offloading at Red Beach Base Area on 21 July 1965.

The battalion engaged in combat operations from July 1965 through July 1969.

In April 1967 the battalion was moved to Cửa Việt Base and under the name Operation Napoleon together with the 1st Battalion, 3rd Marines was tasked with keeping waterways around the base open. Operation Napoleon/Saline concluded on 9 December 1968.

They relocated during July 1969 to Camp Schwab, Okinawa. On April 1, 1976, the battalion was re-designated as the 1st Tracked Vehicle Battalion with two companies of M60A1 (RISE Passive) Tanks and two companies of AAV-7's as well as 1 Company TOW.

=== 1980s and 1990s ===
On November 10, 1988, the battalion was redesignated as the 1st Armored Assault Battalion. On September 30, 1992, it was redesignated as the Combat Support Group and finally became Combat Assault Battalion on October 5, 1994.

=== Deactivation ===
Combat Assault Battalion was deactivated October 12, 2018 with the Battalion assets divided between the rest of the 3d Marine Division. Most of the Battalion's assets including AAVs and LAV-25 mechanized vehicles were transferred to 4th Marine Regiment. The Battalion's Combat Engineer Company was reallocated to other Marine units, including 3rd Marine Regiment and 1st Combat Engineer Battalion.

== Unit awards ==
A unit citation or commendation is an award bestowed upon an organization for the action cited. Members of the unit who participated in said actions are allowed to wear on their uniforms the appropriate ribbon of the awarded unit citation. The Battalion's flag is decorated with the appropriate streamers. Combat Assault Battalion, and those units for which it carries lineage and honors, was awarded the following:

Streamer	Award	Year(s)	Additional Info
	Presidential Unit Citation Streamer with one Silver and one Bronze Star	1942, 1944, 1945, 1950, 1951, 1965–1967, 1968	Guadalcanal, Peleliu, Okinawa, Korea, Vietnam War
	Navy Unit Commendation Streamer with two Bronze Stars	1952–1953, 1968, 2002–2003	Korea, Vietnam, Western Pacific
	Meritorious Unit Commendation Streamer with one Bronze Star	1967–1968, 1968	Vietnam War
	Asiatic-Pacific Campaign Streamer with one Silver Star and one Bronze Star	1942–1945	Guadalcanal, Finschhafen, New Britain, Peleliu, Okinawa
	World War II Victory Streamer	1942–1945	Pacific War
	Navy Occupation Service Streamer with "ASIA"		
	National Defense Service Streamer with three Bronze Stars	1950–1954, 1961–1974, 1990–1995, 2001–present	Korean War, Vietnam War, Gulf War, war on terrorism
	Korean Service Streamer with two Silver Stars	August 1950 - March 1955	Pusan Perimeter, Inchon-Seoul, Chosin Reservoir, East-Central Front, Western Front, Defense of the Demilitarized Zone
	Vietnam Service Streamer with two Silver Stars	July 1965 - July 1969	Da Nang, Cua Viet
	Global War on Terrorism Service Streamer	2001–present	
	Korea Presidential Unit Citation Streamer		
	Vietnam Gallantry Cross with Palm Streamer		

== See also ==
- List of United States Marine Corps battalions
- Organization of the United States Marine Corps
