= James E. Livingston =

US Marine general and holder of the Medal of Honor

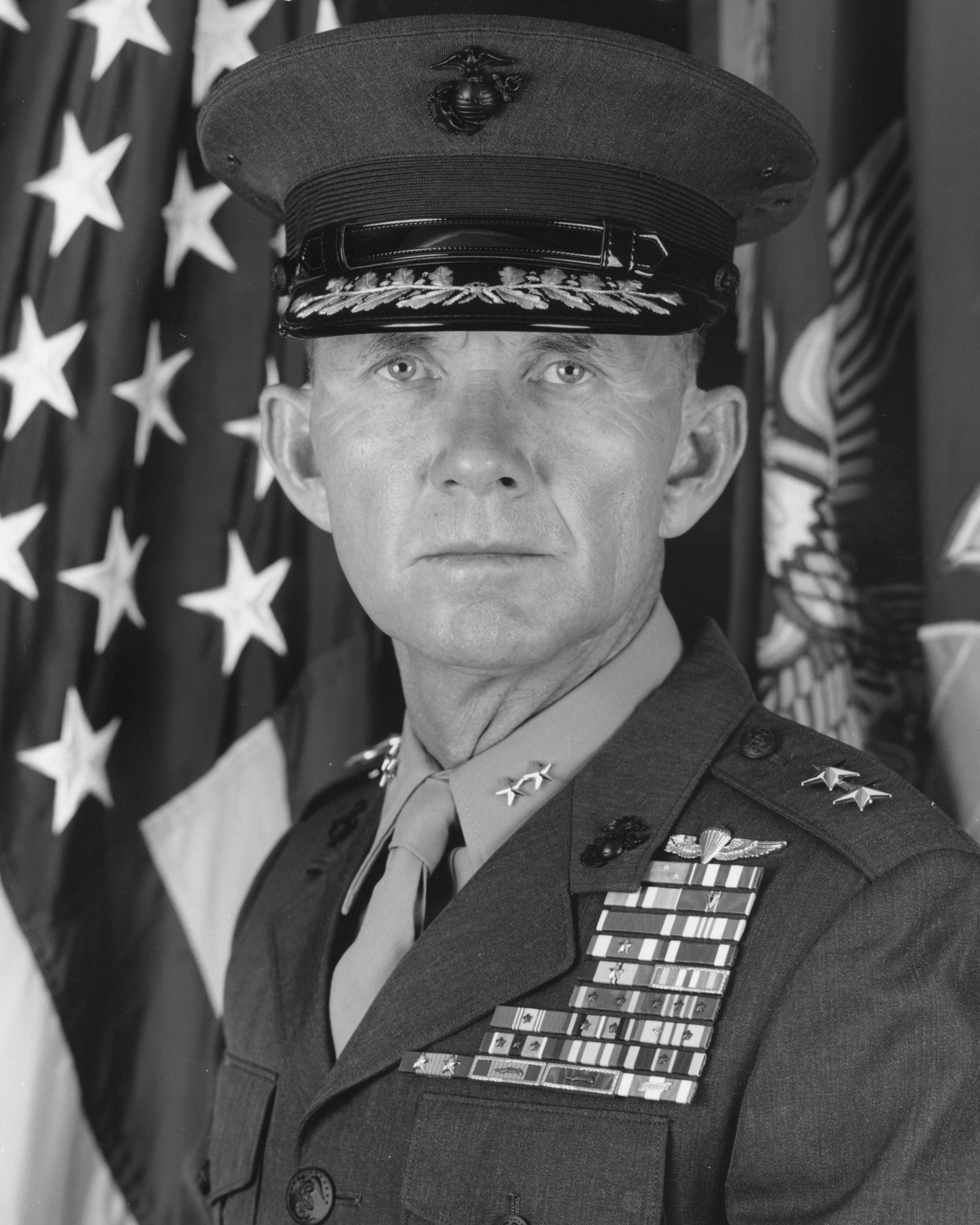
- James E. Livingston
- Born: January 12, 1940 (age 86); Towns, Telfair County, Georgia, U.S.
- Military career
- Allegiance: United States
- Branch: United States Marine Corps
- Service years: 1962–1995
- Rank: Major General
- Unit: 2nd Battalion 4th Marines
- Commands: Marine Forces Reserve; Marine Corps Air Ground Combat Center Twentynine Palms; 6th Marine Regiment
- Conflicts: Vietnam War: Battle of Dai Do
- Awards: Medal of Honor; Navy Distinguished Service Medal; Silver Star; Defense Superior Service Medal; Bronze Star Medal w/ Combat "V"; Purple Heart (3)

James Everett Livingston (born January 12, 1940) is a retired United States Marine major general. He was awarded the United States' highest military decoration, the Medal of Honor, for heroic actions in 1968 during the Vietnam War. Livingston served on active duty in the Marine Corps over 33 years before retiring on September 1, 1995. His last assignment was the Commanding General of Marine Forces Reserve in New Orleans, Louisiana.

== Early life ==
James Livingston was born on January 12, 1940, in Towns, Georgia, the son of Ruth and Myret Livingston. Growing up, he and his brother helped their parents work their 3,000-acre farm.

He graduated from Lumber City High School in 1957. He entered North Georgia College and State University (The Military College of Georgia) in 1957 and was a member of the school's nationally recognized Corps of Cadets until he transferred to pursue a major that the school did not offer. In 1962, Livingston earned a Bachelor of Science degree in civil engineering from Auburn University. While at Auburn University he pledged and was initiated into the Alpha-Delta chapter of Sigma Pi fraternity. He was commissioned a second lieutenant in the United States Marine Corps in June 1962.

== United States Marine Corps ==
Livingston's early assignments included service as a platoon commander, intelligence officer and as a Recruit Training Regiment series commander. Promoted to captain in June 1966, Livingston served as the Commanding Officer of the Marine detachment aboard the Aircraft Carrier USS Wasp, before joining the 3rd Marine Division in the Republic of Vietnam in August 1967.

On May 2, 1968, while serving as Commanding Officer, Company E, 2nd Battalion, 4th Marines, Livingston distinguished himself above and beyond the call of duty in action against enemy forces during the Battle of Dai Do, and earned the Medal of Honor. He returned to the United States in November 1968 and completed the Amphibious Warfare School in Quantico, Virginia. He was presented the Medal of Honor on May 14, 1970, by President Richard Nixon.

After his second tour in Vietnam, Livingston served as an instructor at the United States Army Infantry School, Director of Division Schools for the 1st Marine Division, and later, as S-3 of the 3rd Battalion, 7th Marines. In March 1975 he returned to Vietnam and served as Operations Officer for the Vietnam evacuation operations, which included Operation Frequent Wind, the evacuation of Saigon. Livingston graduated from Marine Corps Command and Staff College in May 1977. Livingston then commanded the Marine Barracks, United Kingdom, London. In 1980 Livingston was selected to attend the Air War College and graduated with a Master's degree in 1981. After graduation, he returned to the Marine Corps Recruit Depot, Parris Island and served as Commanding Officer, 3rd Recruit Training Battalion. He was next assigned as the Assistant Chief of Staff for Operations and Training at the Marine Recruit Depot, Parris Island, South Carolina. During this period, he earned a master's degree in management from Webster University in 1984. He then assumed command of 6th Marines, 2nd Marine Division from February 8, 1986, to June 24, 1987. His next assignment was before the Joint United States Assistance Group in the Republic of the Philippines.

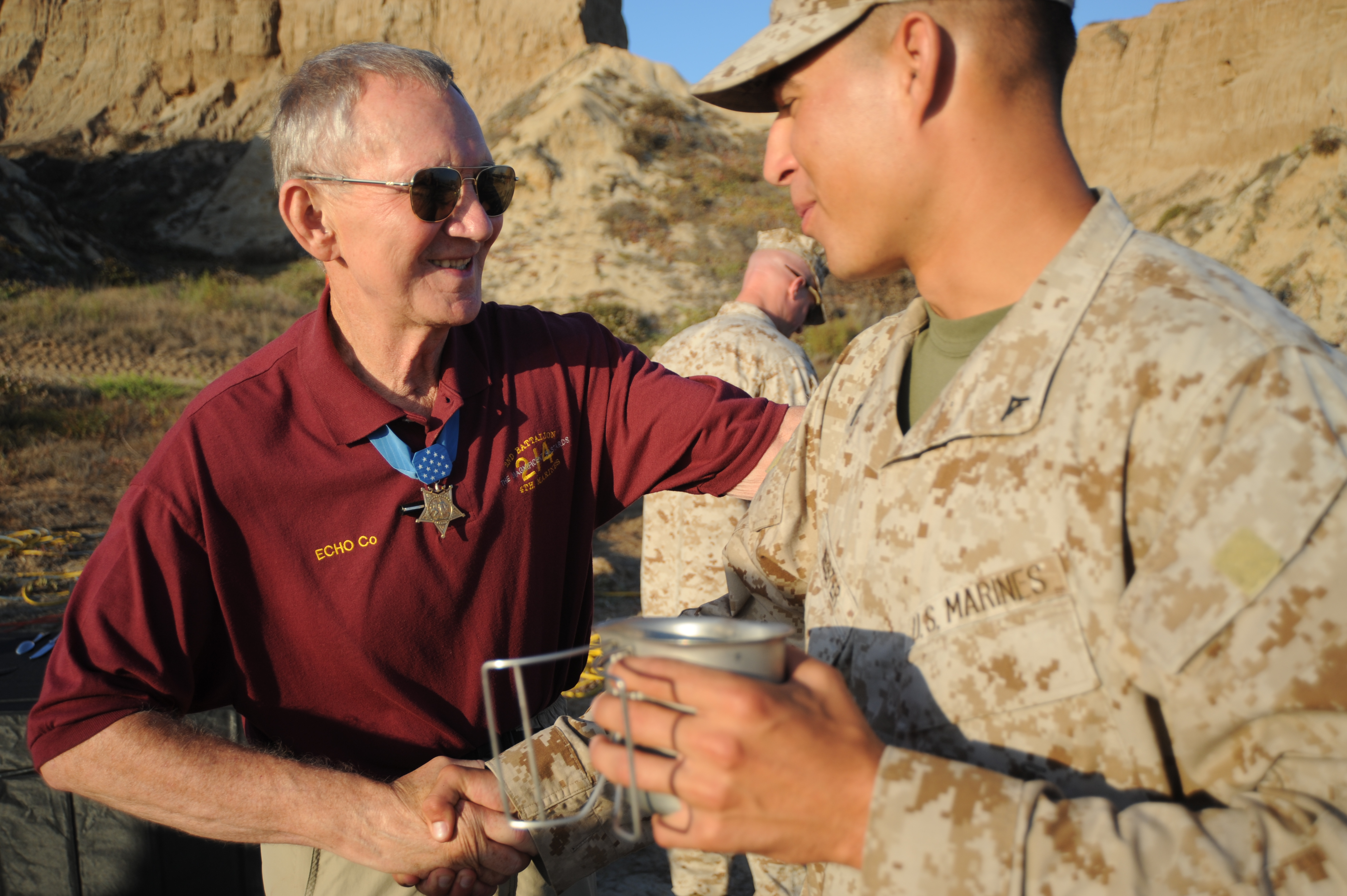
Livingston visits with Marines at Camp Pendleton in 2009

Following advancement to brigadier general on June 10, 1988, Livingston served as Deputy Director for Operations at the National Military Command Center in Washington, D.C. During Operations Desert Shield and Desert Storm, Livingston commanded the Marine Air Ground Combat Center, 29 Palms, California and developed the Desert Warfare Training Program. After command of the 1st Marine Expeditionary Brigade, he was advanced to major general on July 8, 1991, and assumed command of the 4th Marine Division. In July 1992, he assumed command of the newly created Marine Reserve Force, and continued through its reorganization in October 1994, with its new title, "Marine Forces Reserve".

Livingston is a graduate of the Amphibious Warfare School, the Marine Corps Command and Staff College and the Air War College.

=== Retirement ===
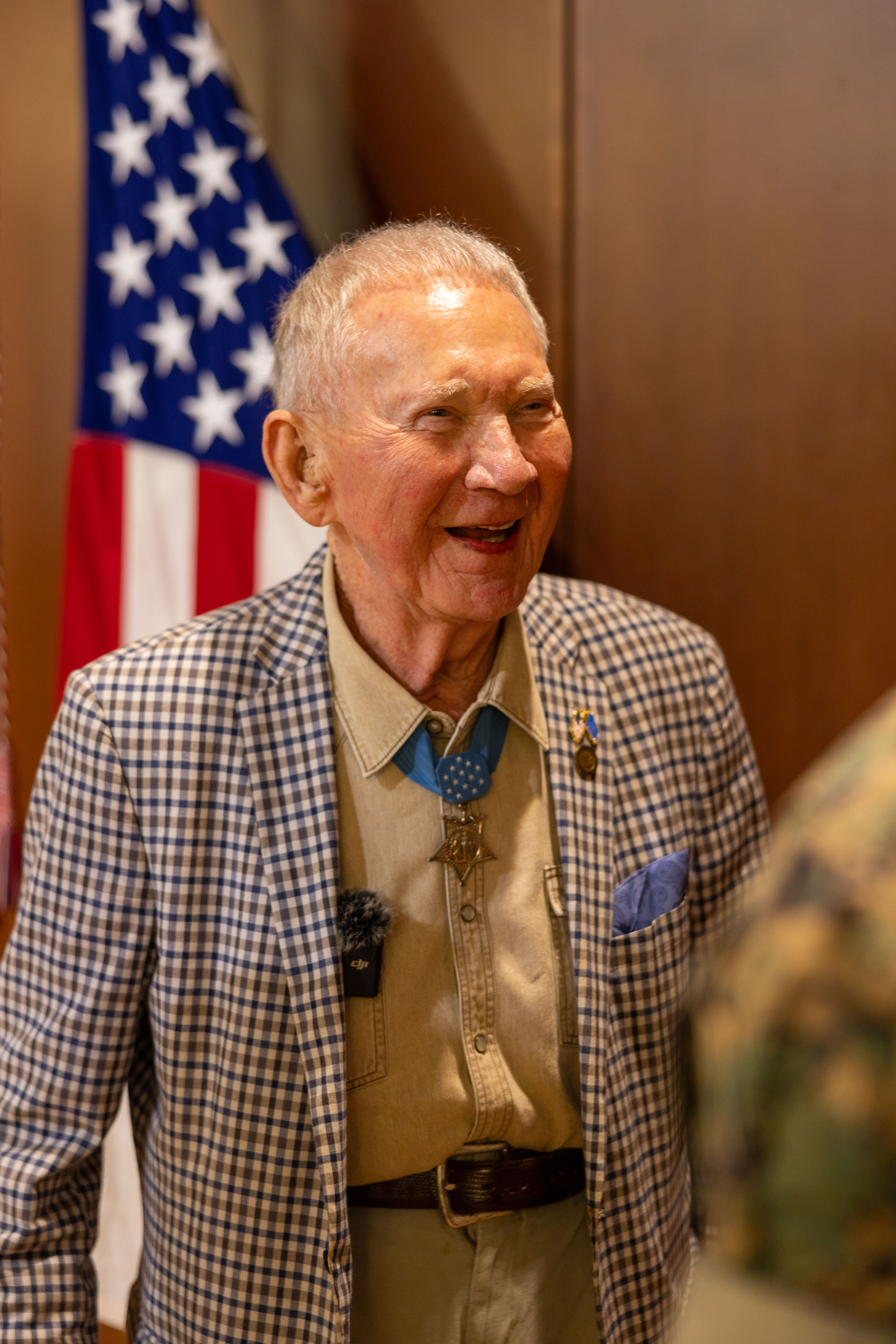
Retired MajGen James E. Livingston, age 85, Medal of Honor recipient and first commander of Marine Forces Reserves visits Marine Corps Support Facility, New Orleans, May 30, 2025.

In retirement, Livingston serves on the board of trustees of the National World War II Museum.

Livingston wrote his autobiography, Noble Warrior: The Story of Maj. Gen. James E. Livingston, Medal of Honor, with historians Colin D. Heaton and Anne-Marie Lewis. It was placed on the Commandant of the Marine Corps reading list in 2011.

On November 6, 2007, the Fred Thompson presidential campaign announced that Livingston would serve as the National Co-Chair of Veterans for Fred Thompson.

In the 2016 presidential election, Livingston was a political supporter of Jeb Bush, and Co-Chair of National Veterans for Jeb. In November 2015, he was featured in an ad called "Honor" in which he referred to President Barack Obama as a "Commander-in-Chief [who] requires training wheels."

In the 2020 presidential election, Livingston endorsed Donald Trump in a letter with dozens of other flag officers stating that a Biden presidency would lead to in influence of the government by "socialists and Marxists". In October 2024, Livingston joined 15 other Medal of Honor recipients in publicly endorsing Donald Trump for president.

== Military awards ==
Livingston's decorations and awards include:

Navy and Marine Corps Parachutist Insignia
| 1st Row | Medal of Honor | Navy Distinguished Service Medal | Silver Star | Defense Superior Service Medal |
| 2nd Row | Bronze Star Medal w/ Combat "V" | Purple Heart w/ two 5/16" Gold Stars | Defense Meritorious Service Medal | Meritorious Service Medal w/ one 5/16" Gold Star |
| 3rd Row | Navy and Marine Corps Commendation Medal | Combat Action Ribbon w/ one 5/16" Gold Star | Joint Meritorious Unit Award | Navy Unit Commendation w/ two 3/16" Bronze Stars |
| 4th Row | Navy Meritorious Unit Commendation w/ three 3/16" Bronze Stars | National Defense Service Medal w/ one 3/16" Bronze Star | Armed Forces Expeditionary Medal w/ two 3/16" Bronze Stars | Vietnam Service Medal w/ one 3/16" Silver Star and one 3/16" Bronze Star |
| 5th Row | Humanitarian Service Medal w/ three 3/16" Bronze Stars | Navy Sea Service Deployment Ribbon | Navy & Marine Corps Overseas Service Ribbon w/ one 3/16" Bronze Star | Marine Corps Drill Instructor Ribbon |
| 6th Row | Republic of Vietnam Gallantry Cross w/ two 5/16" Gold Stars | Republic of Vietnam Meritorious Unit Citation (Gallantry Cross) w/ Palm and Frame | Republic of Vietnam Meritorious Unit Citation (Civil Actions) w/ Palm and Frame | Republic of Vietnam Campaign Medal w/ 1960– Device |
Office of the Joint Chiefs of Staff Identification Badge

=== Medal of Honor citation ===
The President of the United States in the name of The Congress takes pleasure in presenting the MEDAL OF HONOR to CAPTAIN JAMES E. LIVINGSTON
UNITED STATES MARINE CORPS for service as set forth in the following CITATION:

For conspicuous gallantry and intrepidity at the risk of his life above and beyond the call of duty while serving as Commanding Officer, Company E, Second Battalion, Fourth Marines, Ninth Marine Amphibious Brigade in action against enemy forces in the Republic of Vietnam. On 2 May 1968, Company E launched a determined assault on the heavily fortified village of Dai Do, which had been seized by the enemy on the preceding evening isolating a Marine company from the remainder of the battalion. Skillfully employing screening agents, Captain Livingston maneuvered his men to assault positions across 500 meters of dangerous open rice paddy while under intense enemy fire. Ignoring hostile rounds impacting near him, he fearlessly led his men in a savage assault against enemy emplacements within the village. While adjusting supporting arms fire, Captain Livingston moved to the points of heaviest resistance, shouting words of encouragement to his Marines, directing their fire, and spurring the dwindling momentum of the attack on repeated occasions. Although twice painfully wounded by grenade fragments, he refused medical treatment and courageously led his men in the destruction of over 100 mutually supporting bunkers, driving the remaining enemy from their positions, and relieving the pressure on the stranded Marine company. As the two companies consolidated positions and evacuated casualties, a third company passed through the friendly lines launching an assault on the adjacent village of Dinh To, only to be halted by a furious counterattack of an enemy battalion. Swiftly assessing the situation and disregarding the heavy volume of enemy fire, Captain Livingston boldly maneuvered the remaining effective men of his company forward, joined forces with the heavily engaged Marines, and halted the enemy's counterattack. Wounded a third time and unable to walk, he steadfastly remained in a dangerously exposed area, deploying his men to more tenable positions and supervising the evacuation of casualties. Only when assured of the safety of his men did he allow himself to be evacuated. Captain Livingston's gallant actions uphold the highest traditions of the Marine Corps and United States Naval Service.

/S/ RICHARD M. NIXON

=== Silver Star citation ===
Citation:

The President of the United States of America takes pleasure in presenting the Silver Star to Captain James Everett Livingston (MCSN: 0-84449), United States Marine Corps, for conspicuous gallantry and intrepidity in action while serving as Commanding Officer of Company E, Second Battalion, Fourth Marines, 9th Marine Amphibious Brigade, in connection with combat operations against the enemy in the Republic of Vietnam. On 18 March 1968, Captain Livingston's company was participating in a battalion assault against North Vietnamese Army positions in the fortified village of Vinh Quan Thuong in Quang Tri Province when a platoon from an adjacent company became pinned down by the heavy enemy fire. In an attempt to relieve the beleaguered unit, Captain Livingston maneuvered his company forward until the intensity of the fire from the enemy's well-placed, mutually supporting bunkers forced his unit to withdraw to a more advantageous position. Coordinating with the commander of the second company, he then led his unit forward under cover of supporting air strikes and again was halted by the hostile fire. Observing a third company commence an assault against the enemy's flank, Captain Livingston, completely disregarded his own safety as he jumped to his feet during a heavy rocket attack, rallied his men and led them in an aggressive charge against the North Vietnamese positions. His bold actions inspired all who observed him as the Marines seized the village, inflicting 127 North Vietnamese confirmed killed. By his courage, gallant leadership and selfless devotion to duty at great personal risk, Captain Livingston upheld the highest traditions of the Marine Corps and of the United States Naval Service.

== Honors ==
On November 19, 1993, the State of Georgia dedicated a historical marker in Lumber City, Georgia, honoring Livingston and his Medal of Honor actions.

== See also ==
- List of Medal of Honor recipients for the Vietnam War
