= Cửa Việt Base =

Cửa Việt Base
- Quảng Trị, Quảng Trị province in Vietnam
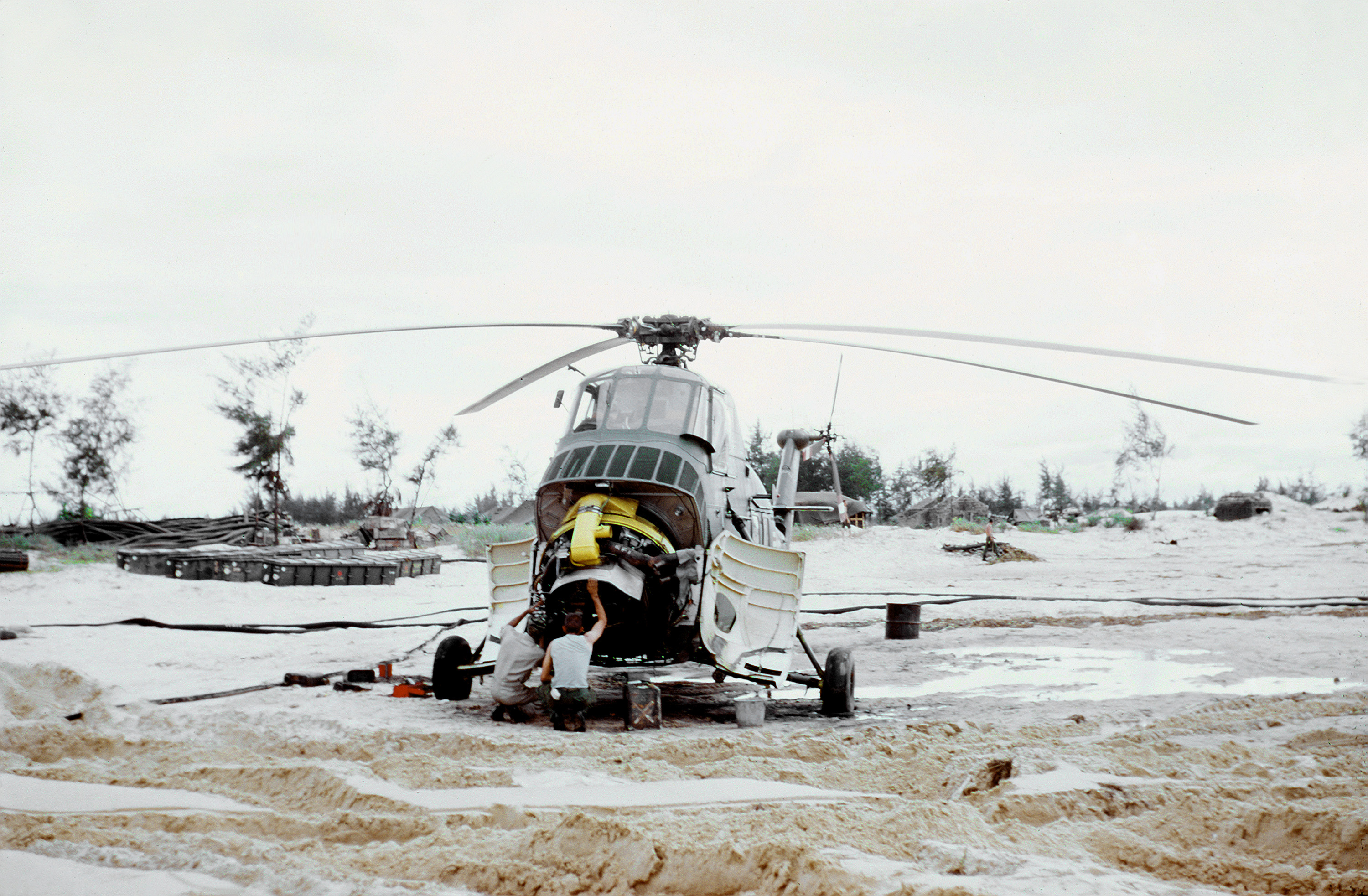
- Marine UH-34D at the base in October 1966

Site information
- Type: Marines/Navy base
- Operator: Army of the Republic of Vietnam (ARVN); United States Marine Corps; United States Army (U.S. Army)
- Condition: Abandoned

Location
- Shown within Vietnam
- Coordinates: 16.905°N 107.187°E

Site history
- Built: 1966
- In use: 1966-1975
- Battles/wars: Vietnam War; Battle of Cua Viet

Garrison information
- Garrison: 3rd Marine Division; ARVN 1st Division; ARVN 3rd Division

Cửa Việt Base (also known as Cửa Việt Combat Base, Cửa Việt Naval Support Activity, Camp Kistler or simply Cửa Việt) is a former U.S. Marine Corps, U.S. Navy, U.S. Army and Army of the Republic of Vietnam (ARVN) base north of Quảng Trị in central Vietnam.

== History ==
=== 1966-7 ===
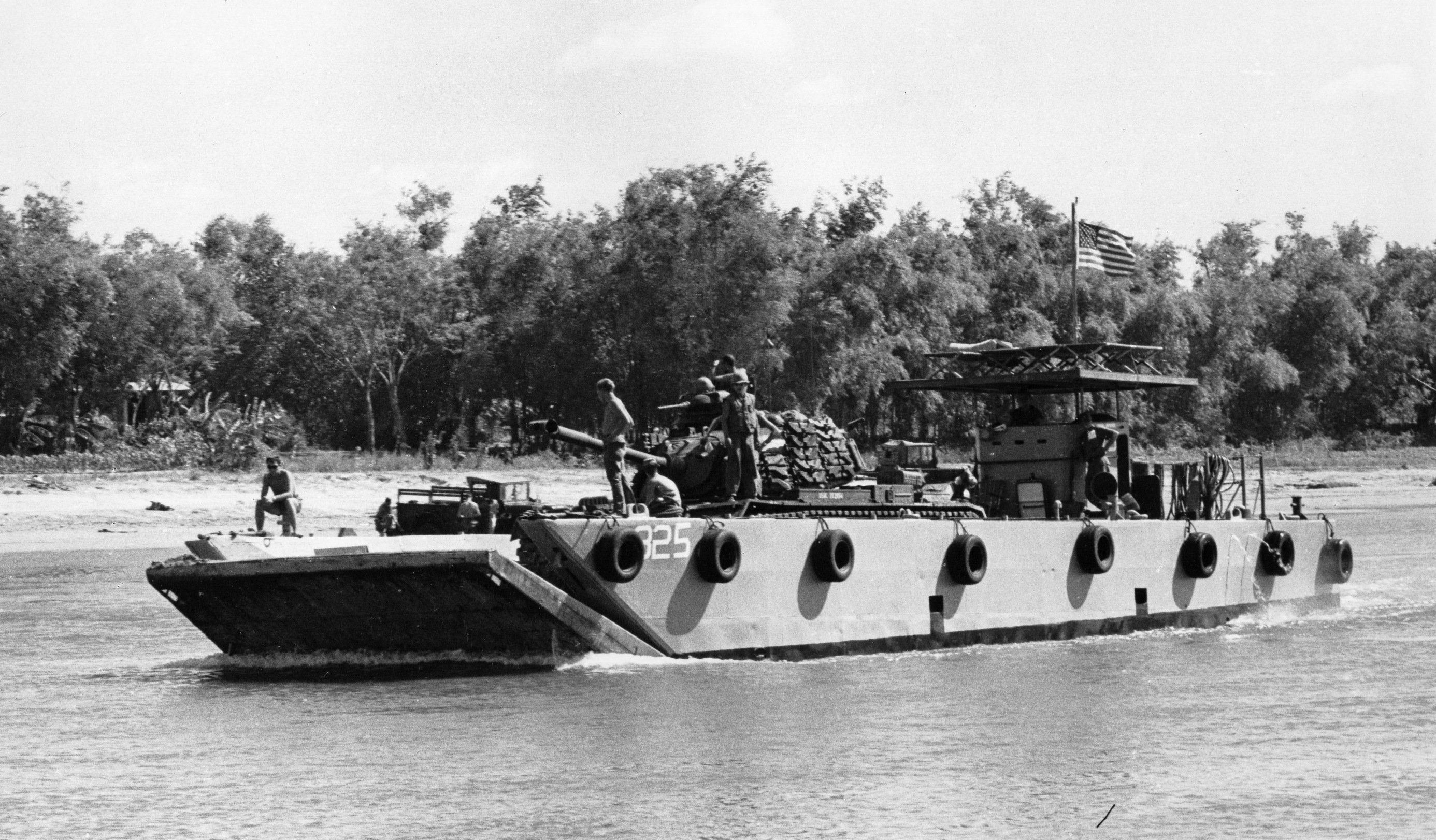
An LCM-8 transports a 3rd Tank Battalion M48 up the Dong Ha River, 6 July 1967

The base was located at the mouth of the Cửa Việt/Thạch Hãn River approximately 16 km north of Quảng Trị and only approximately 10 km south of the Vietnamese Demilitarized Zone (DMZ).

The base was first established by the 3rd Marine Division in 1966 as a logistics and support base for Marine units along the DMZ and particularly the Đông Hà Combat Base once the Cửa Việt/Thạch Hãn River had been dredged to allow passage for LCUs.

In February 1967 the 12th Marines stationed 6 LVTH-6 at the base.

On 18 March an LST ramp opened at the base allowing supplies to be transhipped on LCUs and LCMs to Đông Hà. A petroleum, oil & lubricants (POL) facility was also established at the base, protected by a company from the 1st Battalion, 9th Marines.

In April 1967 under the name Operation Napoleon the 1st Amphibian Tractor Battalion with the 1st Battalion, 3rd Marines was tasked with keeping waterways around the base open. On 16 May the base was hit People's Army of Vietnam (PAVN) rocket and artillery fire resulting in 5 Marines killed. Throughout the latter part of 1967 the base was subjected to frequent PAVN artillery and rocket fire from north of the DMZ.

During the northeast monsoon season the base's LST facility was closed from 7–29 December, limiting the flow of supplies to Marine bases.

=== 1968–71 ===
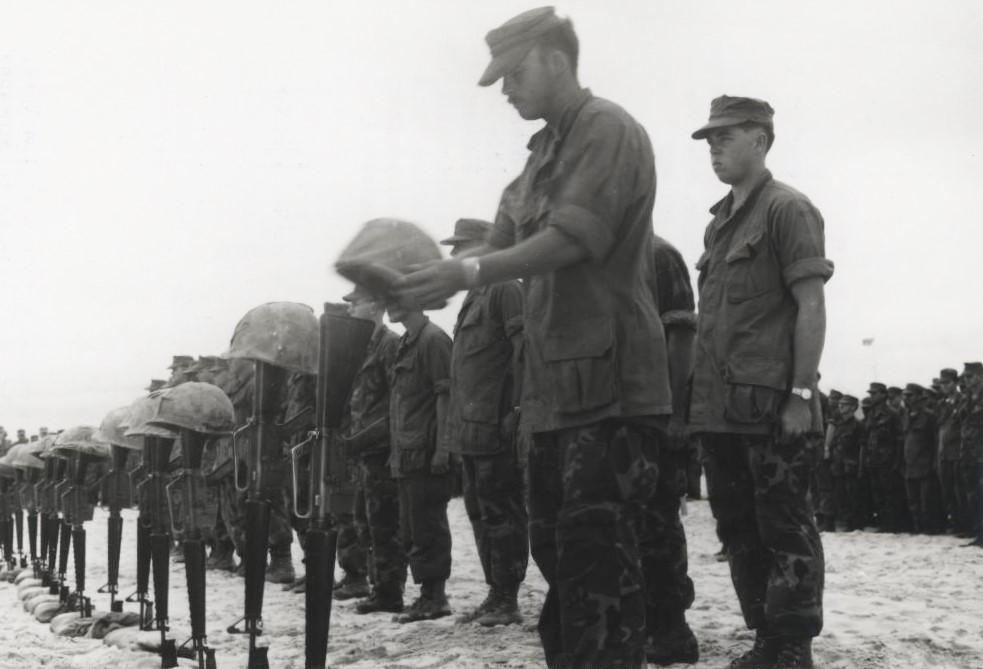
2/4 Marines memorial service at Cua Viet Base in 1969

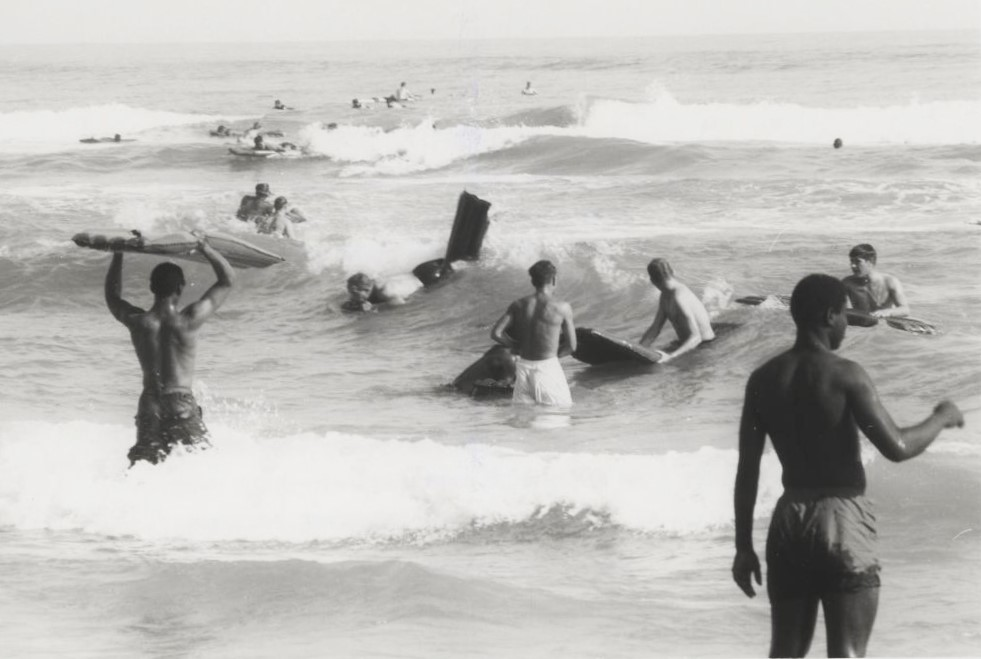
1/9 Marines enjoy the surf during 2 day rest and recreation at Cua Viet beach in 1969

On 20 January 1968 PAVN artillery fire targeted navy boats on the river forcing the closure of the waterway. PAVN artillery fire, mines and fire from the north bank of the river continued to menace shipping for the following days and the Marines suffered 16 dead in clearing out PAVN ambush sites. From 23–26 January the 3rd Battalion, 1st Marines launched Operation Badger Catch to secure the north bank of the river and prevent PAVN reinforcements from entering the area.

On 24 February the Navy established Task Force Clearwater composed on 20 PBRs plus assorted support ships to keep the river open. On 29 February 3 Marines moved to the base to take control of the newly merged Operation Napoleon/Saline. The Marines and ARVN claimed over 1000 PAVN killed in area during the month of February.

On 10 March the base was hit by PAVN artillery, destroying 150 tons of ammunition, damaging numerous buildings and killing 1 American. On 11 April PAVN artillery hit the base's fuel farm destroying 40,000 gallons of petroleum. On 13 June PAVN artillery destroyed 104,000 gallons of petroleum at the base. On 19, 21 and 24 June the base was hit by PAVN artillery fire resulting in the destruction of ammunition and petroleum storage facilities.

An in-country rest and recreation center was established at the base and it was used for rehabilitation of Marine units coming in from operations along the DMZ.

On 21 February 1969 at 03:15 a U.S. Navy LCM-6 tied up at the base was damaged by an explosion, killing one sailor. At 04:00 two other LCMs were damaged by explosions. At 04:20 an explosive ordnance team detonated another satchel charge attached to an LCM and at 05:48 another explosion hit an LCM. U.S. Navy personnel saw a swimmer in the water and fired on him and at dawn found a dead North Vietnamese swimmer wearing Soviet scuba gear.

In September 1969 as part of Operation Keystone Cardinal the 3rd Marine Division began its withdrawal from Vietnam. The 4th Marines assumed responsibility for the Cua Viet area from the 3rd Marines, before departing from Cua Viet themselves on 22 October. The Marines handed over control of their tactical area of operations (including base) to the 1st Brigade, 5th Infantry Division and the ARVN 1st Division.

On 15 February 1970 Naval Support Activity Cửa Việt was disbanded and responsibility for the base was handed over to the US Army.

=== 1972–5 ===
In late October 1972 as part of the counteroffensive to the Easter Offensive, the Army of the Republic of Vietnam (ARVN) began attacks north of Quảng Trị to try to regain positions along the south bank of the Cam Lộ/Cửa Việt River. The attacks were met with a stiff PAVN resistance and were stopped at the Thạch Hãn River. A further attack from the coast by the Vietnamese Marines in November made limited gains. By the end of 1972 the Marines and ARVN occupied positions 5 km south of the river. As the ongoing peace negotiations would soon lead to a ceasefire, the South Vietnamese Joint General Staff sought the most advantageous battlefield positions possible and so ordered a further effort to regain the south bank of the Cam Lộ/Cửa Việt River.

On 15 January 1973 planning began for a final assault on Cửa Việt . A special combined unit called Task Force Tango was organized, consisting of the 3rd, 4th and 5th Marine Battalions and elements of the 1st Armored Brigade. The task force was put under the command of Colonel Nguyen Thanh Tri, Deputy Commander of the RVN Marine Division.

The operation began at 06:55 on 26 January with Task Force Tango advancing in two columns. Besides ARVN firepower, naval gunfire of the United States Seventh Fleet was used to soften the target and hinder PAVN reinforcements. The PAVN put up fierce resistance to the attack, destroying 26 M-48s and M-113s with AT-3 missiles and shooting down two Republic of Vietnam Air Force planes with SA-7 missiles. At 01:45 on 28 January the Marines made a final assault and by 07:00 had broken through the PAVN lines to recapture the base. At 08:00 in accordance with the Paris Peace Accords the ceasefire came into effect and the U.S. stopped all support for Task Force Tango. On the evening of 29 January, the PAVN launched a counterattack against Task Force Tango, and by the next day had succeeded in cutting off its lines of communication and began bombarding the encircled Marines. A Republic of Vietnam Navy LCM was destroyed as it tried to resupply the Marines. The Marines attempted to break out on the early morning of 31 January and the PAVN recaptured the base.

Following the capture of the base the PAVN integrated it into their logistics network in northern Quảng Trị Province. During the 1975 Spring Offensive, the PAVN moved the 66th Mechanized Infantry Battalion, 202nd Armored Brigade by rail to Vinh and then by ship to Cửa Việt.
