= James J. McMonagle =

United States Marine Corps general

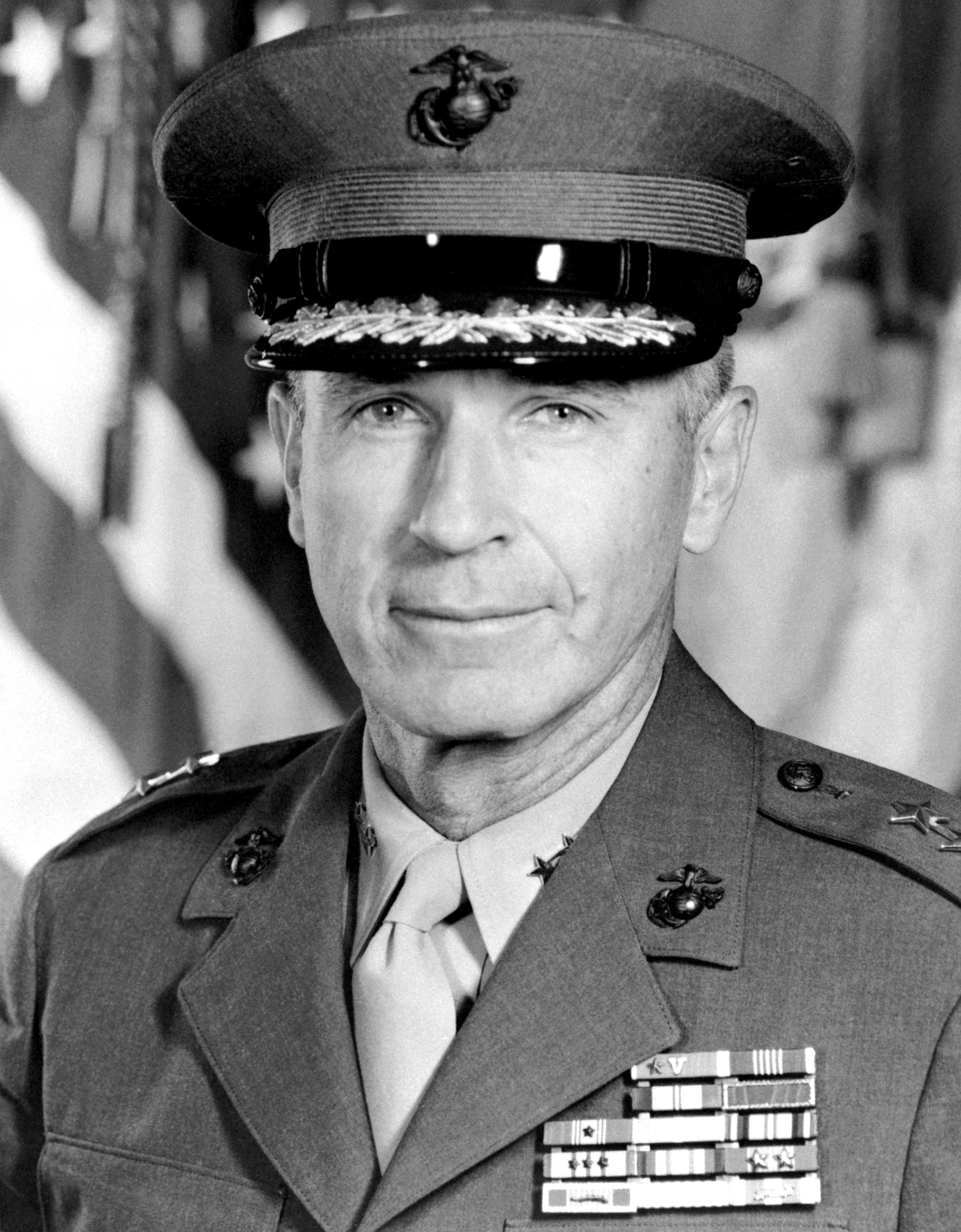
- Born: February 18, 1932; San Antonio, Texas, U.S.
- Died: October 7, 2024 (aged 92)
- Military career
- Allegiance: United States of America
- Branch: United States Marine Corps
- Service years: 1953–1988
- Rank: Major General
- Commands: 1st Marine Division
- Conflicts: Vietnam War; Korean War
- Awards: Legion of Merit

James Joseph McMonagle (February 18, 1932 – October 7, 2024) was a retired United States Marine Corps Major General who served as Commanding General of the 1st Marine Division and Marine Corps Recruit Depot Parris Island.

== Marine career ==
McMonagle was commissioned in the United States Marine Corps as a Second Lieutenant after graduation from University of Notre Dame in 1953. He graduated from The Basic School at Marine Corps Base Quantico and served as Infantry Platoon Leader in Korea near the Demilitarized Zone with 3rd Battalion, 1st Marines. After service in Korea, he was deployed to Lebanon as communications officer for 1st Battalion, 8th Marines in to handle an international crisis between Lebanon and the newly-formed United Arab Republic. The Marines served as a peace-keeping force. McMonagle served as rifle company commander with 2nd Marine Division. He attended Amphibious Warfare School in 1961 and was promoted to Major in July 1964. As a Lieutenant Colonel, McMonagle was assigned command of the 2nd Battalion, 3rd Marines and deployed to Republic of Vietnam in 1968. For his combat service in Vietnam, McMonagle was awarded the Legion of Merit with Combat “V”. McMonagle later earned a Master's degree after graduation from the College of Naval Warfare, Naval War College on July 1, 1974. McMonagle was promoted to Colonel in 1975. His staff assignments include Marine officer instructor at the University of Mississippi; Executive Officer, 8th Marine Regiment; Fleet Marine Force, Atlantic; and Headquarters Marine Corps, Washington, D.C. In 1979, McMonagle was promoted to the rank of Brigadier General. In 1980, McMonagle was Deputy Commanding General of Marine Corps Recruit Depot San Diego. As a Major General, McMonagle was reassigned as Commanding General, 1st Marine Division, I Marine Amphibious Force on August 13, 1986. McMonagle relinquished command to Major General John P. Monahan on July 19, 1988 and retired from active duty after 35 years of service.

== Awards and decorations ==
U.S. military decorations
Legion of Merit with Combat Distinguishing Device and gold award star
Meritorious Service Medal
Navy and Marine Corps Commendation Medal
Combat Action Ribbon with gold award star
U.S. Unit Awards
Navy Unit Commendation
U.S. Service (Campaign) Medals and Service and Training Ribbons
National Defense Service Medal with bronze campaign star
Korean Service Medal
Armed Forces Expeditionary Medal
Vietnam Service Medal with two bronze service stars
Sea Service Deployment Ribbon
Vietnam Gallantry Cross
Vietnam Civil Actions Medal
United Nations Service Medal
Vietnam Campaign Medal

U.S. badges, patches and tabs
Rifle Expert Badge
Pistol Expert Badge
