= Operation Colorado =

Part of the Vietnam War (1966)

- Part of the Vietnam War
Date	6–22 August 1966
Location	Hiệp Đức District, Quảng Nam Province, South Vietnam 15.67°N 108.336°E
Result	U.S./ARVN claim victory

Belligerents
South Vietnam; United States	North Vietnam

Commanders and leaders
(South Vietnam) Hoàng Xuân Lãm (United States) Charles F. Widdecke	

Units involved
(United States) 1st Marine Division: 1st Battalion, 5th Marines; 2nd Battalion, 5th Marines; 2nd Battalion, 11th Marines; (South Vietnam) 2nd Infantry Division (South Vietnam) Marine Division	2nd Division

Casualties and losses
(South Vietnam) 26 killed (United States) 99 killed	350 killed 20+ captured

Operation Colorado/Lien Ket 52 was a US Marine Corps and Army of the Republic of Vietnam (ARVN) operation that took place in the Hiệp Đức District, lasting from 6–22 August 1966 planned by Major General Lewis J. Fields, Commanding General of 1st Marine Division.

== Background ==
On 30 July 1966 the 5th Marine Regiment was instructed to begin planning a search and destroy operation in the Hiệp Đức and Song Ly Ly vallies with the ARVN 2nd Division to locate and engage the People's Army of Vietnam (PAVN) 2nd Division. The operation plan called for the ARVN 2nd and 4th Battalions supported by the 2nd and 3rd APC Troops of the 4th Armored Cavalry to advance southwest from Thăng Bình towards Quế Sơn where 3 Vietnamese Marine Battalions would form blocking positions. Meanwhile, the 2nd Battalion, 5th Marines would be landed by helicopters southwest of Hiệp Đức and they would move eastwards towards the ARVN, with the 1st Battalion, 5th Marines reinforcing if required.

== Operation ==
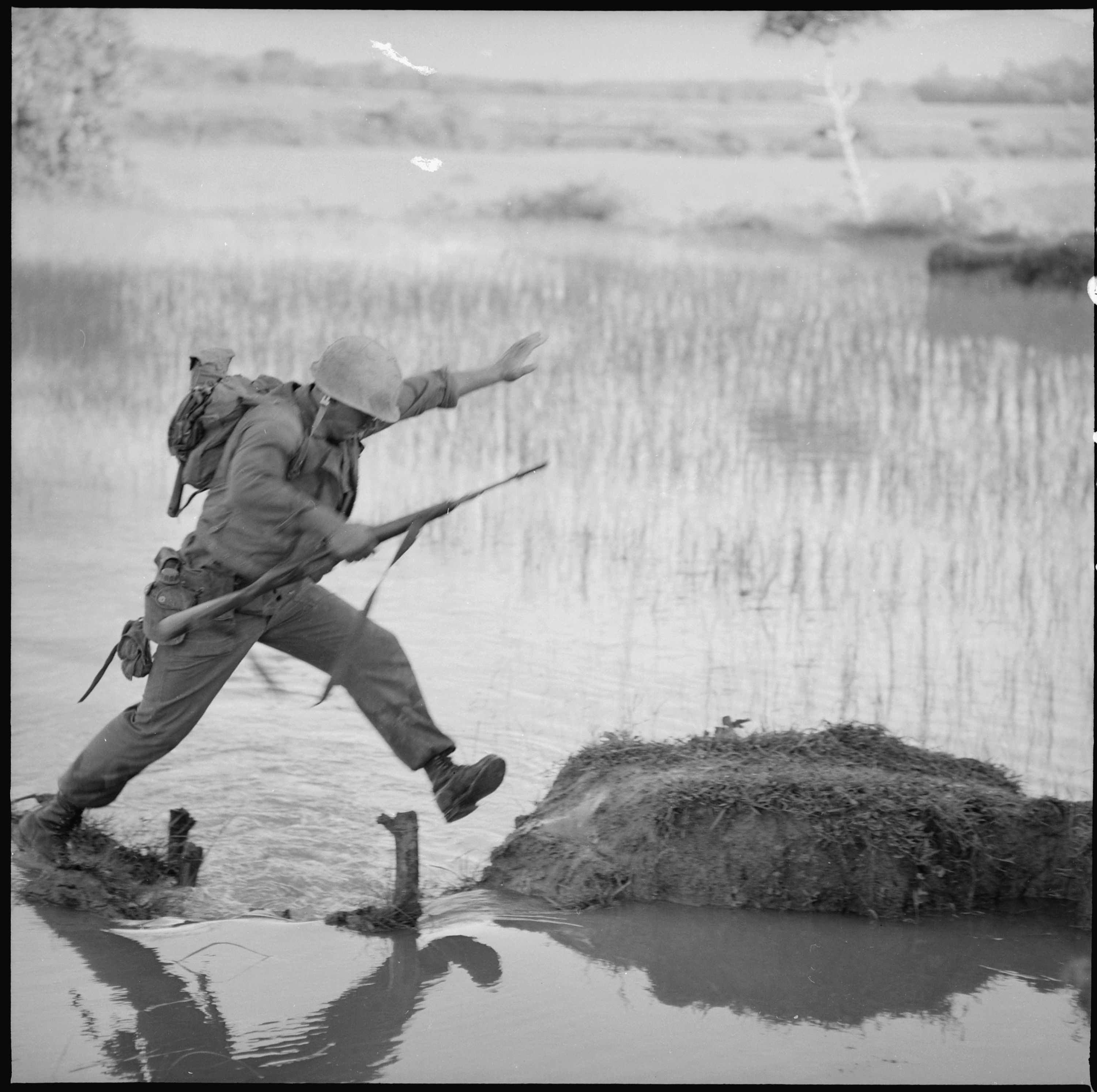
A Marine from Company H, 2/5th Marines crosses a rice paddy

=== 6 August ===
On the morning of 6 August after preparatory air and artillery strikes, helicopters from MAG-16 and MAG-36 began ferrying the Vietnamese and U.S. Marines to their landing zones. The Vietnamese Marines were heavily engaged on landing, killing 50 and capturing 20 PAVN from the 1st Battalion, 3rd Regiment before breaking contact at nightfall.

=== 7 August ===
On the morning of 7 August the Vietnamese Marines moved north towards the hamlet of Thach Thu'ong (3) which the PAVN were believed to have fortified. The attack was delayed due to heavy rains and poor visibility prevented airstrikes until the afternoon. The Vietnamese made a frontal attack on the hamlet but were driven back twice before withdrawing to allow artillery and airstrikes to hit the PAVN positions.

=== 8 August ===
On the morning of the 8th the Vietnamese Marines secured Thach Thu'ong (3) with no opposition as the PAVN had retreated during the night. 37 PAVN bodies were located in the village. Also that day after 2 days without enemy contact the 2/5 Marines returned to Tam Kỳ.

=== 10 August ===
At 08:30 as the 1/5 Marines which had been deployed in the Quế Sơn Valley with no enemy contact was preparing to move from Đại Đồng east towards Route 1 it began to receive harassment fire. By 15:00 as the Marine column approached the hamlet of Cam Khe in a heavy rainstorm approximately 30 PAVN were seen running across a paddyfield and were engaged by the Marines. Soon the entire Regiment was fighting the PAVN at close quarters, unable to call in supporting arms because of the poor visibility. At 17:30 the rains lifted and UH-1 gunships from VMO-6 and A-4s from MAG-12 began hitting the PAVN positions. By nightfall the PAVN had disengaged with the loss of over 100 dead, while the Marines had lost 14 dead and 65 wounded.

=== 13 August ===
At 10:30 two PAVN Battalions engaged the Vietnamese Marine/ARVN Cavalry force near Vinh Huy in an all-day battle before disengaging at nightfall. South Vietnamese losses were 26 dead and 54 wounded while over 140 PAVN bodies were left behind.

== Aftermath ==
Operation Lien Ket concluded on 14 August with the Vietnamese Marines/ARVN returning to Thăng Bình. Operation Colorado concluded on 22 August the Marines had suffered 99 dead and 212 wounded and the PAVN 283 killed.
