= Clifford B. Drake =

United States Marine Corps general

Clifford Barnes Drake
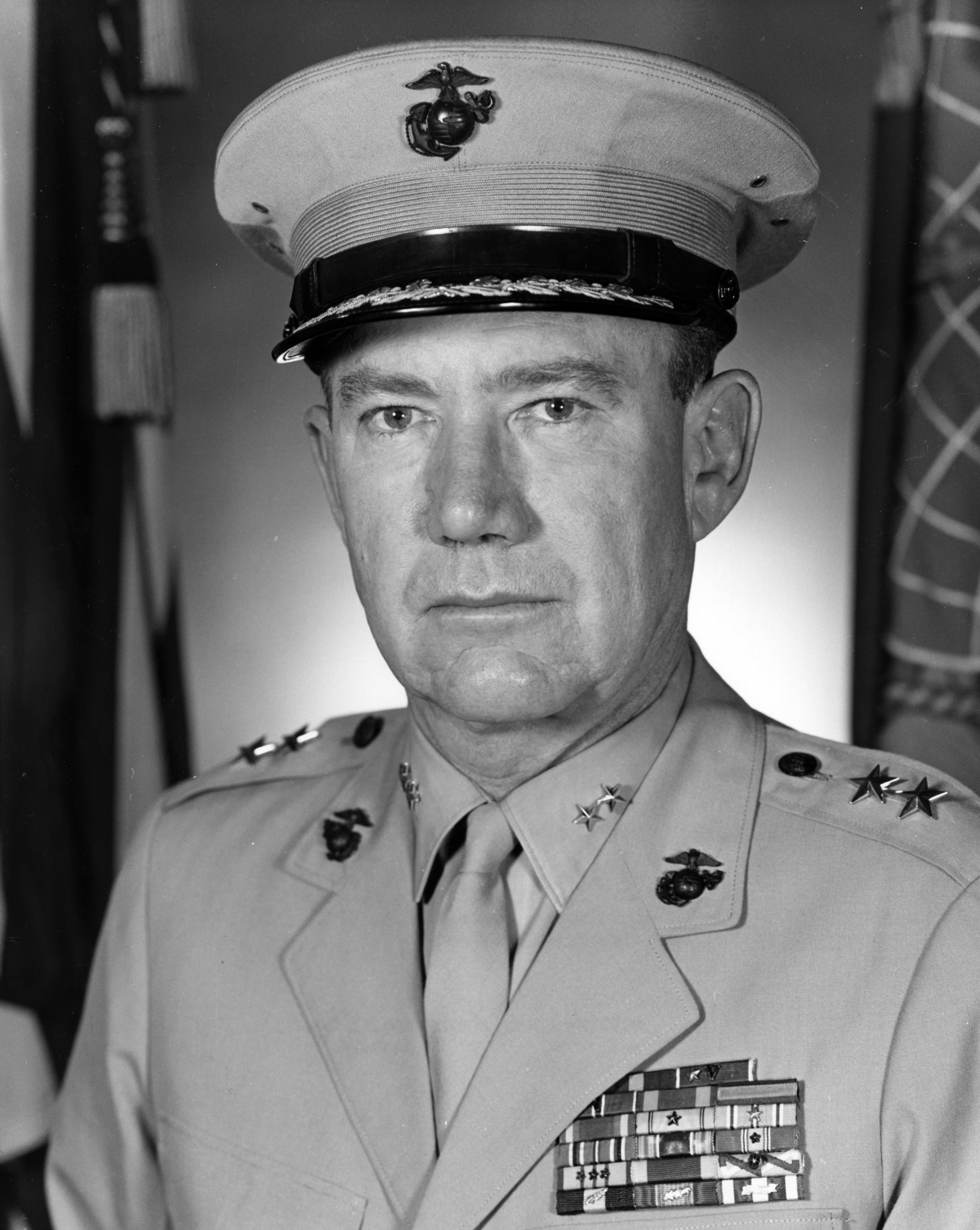
- MG Clifford B. Drake, USMC
- Born: November 7, 1918; New York City, New York, U.S.
- Died: October 25, 1994 (aged 75); Seminole, Florida, U.S.
- Military career
- Allegiance: United States of America
- Branch: United States Marine Corps
- Service years: 1940–1972
- Rank: Major general
- Service number: 0-6676
- Commands: Marine Corps Reserve; 12th Marine Regiment; 1st Battalion, 14th Marines; 2nd Battalion, 14th Marines
- Conflicts: World War II: Attack on Pearl Harbor; Solomon Islands campaign; Battle of Kwajalein; Battle of Saipan; Battle of Tinian; Battle of Iwo Jima; Vietnam War: Tet Offensive
- Awards: Distinguished Service Medal; Legion of Merit (3); Bronze Star Medal; Air Medal

Clifford Barnes Drake (November 7, 1918 – October 25, 1994) was a highly decorated officer of the United States Marine Corps with the rank of major general. He served as an artillery officer during World War II and later took part in the Vietnam War as deputy commander of XXIV Corps.

== Early career and World War II ==
Clifford B. Drake was born on November 7, 1918, in New York City, but his family moved to Los Angeles, California, where he attended high school in 1935 and then the University of California (UCLA), earning a Bachelor of Arts degree in Physics in June 1940. While at UCLA, he was a member of a Reserve Officers' Training Corps unit and was commissioned a second lieutenant in the Coast Artillery Reserve Corps.

Drake resigned his reserve rank in order to accept an appointment as second lieutenant in the United States Marine Corps on July 1, 1940. He was sent to Officer Candidates School at Quantico, Virginia, for further officer education. After a three-months course there, he was attached to the Marine detachment aboard the battleship USS California.

While serving on the California, Drake was present at Pearl Harbor on December 7, 1941, during the Japanese attack. He was officer of the deck on that day and was relieved by Ensign Herbert C. Jones around 7:30 am. Drake went for breakfast and heard explosions and the engines of the attacking Japanese aircraft 20 minutes later. The general quarters alarm then summoned the crew to battle stations, and Drake went to the foretop of the ship, where he directed its defense. Ensign Jones was later killed by a bomb explosion and received the Congressional Medal of Honor for his actions on California.

The damaged and partially flooded California settled into the mud with only her superstructure remaining above the surface. Drake was subsequently transferred to 3rd Defense Battalion under Lieutenant Colonel Robert H. Pepper and continued in the defense of Pearl Harbor. He showed great organizational skills and was promptly promoted to the rank of first lieutenant following the attack.

Drake was then attached to the Marine detachment aboard the transport ship USS Argonne for a brief period, before he was posted to the staff of Vice Admiral Robert L. Ghormley, Commander, South Pacific Area. While in this capacity, Drake was promoted to the rank of captain in May 1942 and also served in this command under Admiral William Halsey during the Solomon Islands campaign.

He was ordered back to the United States in early 1943 in order to attend the Army Field Artillery School at Fort Sill, Oklahoma. He completed the course in June 1943 and was promoted to the rank of major at the same time. Ordered to Camp Pendleton, California, he was attached to the newly activated 14th Marine Artillery Regiment as executive officer of 1st Battalion. His regiment was subsequently attached to the newly created 4th Marine Division under Major General Harry Schmidt as its main artillery component. The 14th Marines later relocated to Camp Dunlap for further training and Drake received word of its upcoming combat deployment to the Pacific: the Marshall Islands.

The main target of the landing for the 4th Marine Division, was Roi Namur atoll, which served as a large air base and center of air activity in the Marshall Islands. With the securing of that atoll, Allied forces would have a new base for future offensives in the Pacific. Drake and his 1st Battalion deployed their 75mm Howitzers on the island of Ennubirr in the evening of January 31, 1944. They landed on Blue Beach 4 at 5:00pm and provided support fire for the advancing Allied units. The atoll was declared secure on February 2 and 1st Battalion was ordered to serve as a garrison unit until February 29.

The 1st Battalion then rejoined rest of the regiment, which had in the interim been ordered to Maui, Hawaii, for rest and further training. In mid-May, the 14th Marines were ordered back to the combat area, when they received orders for the forthcoming assault on Saipan in the Marianas. Drake landed with his battalion on Yellow Beach and participated in combat against enemy until July 9, 1944.

Following the capture of Saipan, the 4th Marine Division was ordered to take part in the landing on near Tinian on July 24. The 1st Battalion was the first artillery unit ashore and immediately commenced a barrage of gunfire. During the morning of the following day, Japanese artillery hit the command post of the 1st Battalion and almost wiped out the unit's command structure, including its commander, Lieutenant Colonel Harry J. Zimmer.

Drake took charge and supervised the evacuation of wounded and dead. He reestablished the battalion's command post and continued in its mission, providing artillery support to the 25th Marine Regiment. He led the battalion until the end of hostilities on August 1 and subsequently returned to Maui, Hawaii during the first week of August. For his actions on 25 July, when the battalion's command post was shelled, Drake received the Legion of Merit with Combat "V" and Navy Presidential Unit Citation.

While in Hawaii, Drake assumed command of the 2nd Battalion, 14th Marines and took part in several ship-to-shore maneuvers until January 27, 1945. The 2nd Battalion subsequently sailed for its new destination, Iwo Jima.

Drake went ashore with his battalion in the evening on February 19, 1945, and immediately deployed his howitzers. which began firing the same evening during the advance of the 25th Marines. Drake was later decorated with the Bronze Star Medal with Combat "V" for his service on Iwo Jima. He also received the Navy Unit Commendation.

== Postwar service ==
The 14th Marines returned to the United States in October 1945 and following the disbandment of the regiment at the end of November of that year, Drake was transferred to the Marine Corps Base San Diego, where he remained until April 1946. He was subsequently ordered to nearby Coronado Base, as an artillery instructor within Troop Training Unit, Pacific Fleet under Major General Harry K. Pickett. He later served as assistant chief of staff for personnel within this command.

Drake was transferred to Washington, D.C., in March 1948 and appointed administrative assistant and aide to the Vice Chief of Naval Operations, Admiral Arthur W. Radford. He continued in this capacity under Admirals John D. Price and Lynde D. McCormick and was promoted to the rank of lieutenant colonel in August 1949.

He also earned a Master of Arts degree in education from Stanford University in June 1951 and subsequently joined the 2nd Marine Division at Camp Lejeune, North Carolina. Drake served under Major General Edwin A. Pollock as assistant chief of staff for personnel and then as commander of the 4th and later 3rd Battalions, 10th Marine Regiment. He finished his tenure with the 10th Marines as regimental operations officer in October 1953 and subsequently served as head of Enlisted Coordinator Section, Personnel Department at Headquarters Marine Corps.

In November 1956, Drake was ordered to England as a student in the Joint Service Staff College in Latimer, Buckinghamshire. Upon graduation in June of the following year, he became the Marine Corps representative to the British Joint Service Amphibious Warfare Center at Poole, Dorset. He was promoted to colonel in September 1957 and returned to the United States in April 1959.

One month later, Drake was appointed executive officer of the personnel division at Headquarters Marine Corps and served in that capacity under Major General August Larson until July 1961, when he was ordered to the Far East. He subsequently assumed duties as commanding officer of the 12th Marine Artillery Regiment, 3rd Marine Division and served in that capacity until August 1962.

Upon his return stateside, Drake attended National War College in Washington, D.C., and graduated in June 1963. His next duty brought him to Quantico, where he was named director, Marine Corps Command and Staff College.

== Vietnam War ==
Drake was promoted to the rank of brigadier general in January 1966 and appointed director, Marine Corps Reserve at Headquarters Marine Corps. He was responsible for the administration of all reserve marine troops, which were used as reinforcements for combat units in Vietnam. He was promoted to the rank of major general on August 2, 1967. Drake served in that capacity until April 1968 and received his second Legion of Merit for his service there.

He was subsequently ordered to Vietnam, where he assumed duties as deputy commander of XXIV Corps under Lieutenant General Richard G. Stilwell. He served in that capacity during the Tet Offensive and was decorated with Distinguished Service Medal for his service during that period. He also received the Air Medal for his participation in observation flights over the combat area as well as several decorations from the Government of South Vietnam.

In June 1969, Drake was relieved by Major General Edwin B. Wheeler and returned to the United States, where he assumed duties as assistant chief of staff for operations at Headquarters Marine Corps. He served in that capacity until October 1972, when he retired from the Marine Corps after 32 years of active service. During his retirement ceremony, Drake received his third Legion of Merit.

== Retirement ==
Drake settled in Alexandria, Virginia, where he lived with his wife Margery Forbes Jones. The couple had two children: Christopher, born in 1950, and Carolyn, born in 1951. He died on October 25, 1994, in Seminole, Florida.

== Awards and decorations ==
Here is the ribbon bar of General Drake:

1st Row	Navy Distinguished Service Medal		Legion of Merit with Combat "V" and two 5/16" Gold Stars
2nd Row	Bronze Star Medal with Combat "V"	Air Medal	Navy Presidential Unit Citation
3rd Row	Navy Unit Commendation	American Defense Service Medal with Base Clasp	American Campaign Medal
4th Row	Asiatic-Pacific Campaign Medal with one silver 3/16 inch service star	World War II Victory Medal	National Defense Service Medal with one star
5th Row	Vietnam Service Medal with three 3/16 inch service stars	National Order of Vietnam, Knight	Vietnam Navy Distinguished Service Order, 1st Class
6th Row	Vietnam Gallantry Cross with Palm	Navy Gallantry Cross with gold anchor	Vietnam Campaign Medal

== See also ==
- Battle of Tinian
- Marine Corps Reserve
- XXIV Corps

Military offices
Preceded by Joseph L. Stewart	Director of Marine Corps Reserve; January 1966 - April 1968	Succeeded by Charles F. Widdecke
