= Sơn Thắng massacre =

1970 massacre in South Vietnam

- Sơn Thắng massacre (Vietnam)
- Location: Sơn Thắng, Quế Sơn County, Quang Nam Province, South Vietnam (now Quế Sơn Commune, Da Nang, Vietnam)
- Date: 19 February 1970
- Target: Sơn Thắng hamlet
- Attack type: Massacre
- Deaths: 7 women and 9 children (16 Total)
- Perpetrators: Company B, 1st Battalion, 7th Marines

The Sơn Thắng massacre (/sənˈtæŋ/ sən-TANG, Vietnamese: [ʂəːŋ˧˧ tʰaŋ˦˧˥]) was a massacre conducted by the United States Marine Corps on 19 February 1970, in which seven women and nine children were killed. The Marines reported the civilians killed as being Vietcong (VC) killed in a firefight. These incidents were reported by civilians and charges were brought against the Marines. Four Marines were court-martialed and one was sentenced to five years in prison and the other to life, but Major General Charles F. Widdecke reduced each sentence to less than a year.

== Background ==
On 12 February, a VC ambush had killed nine Marines from Company B, 1st Battalion, 7th Marines.

A five-man Marine "hunter-killer" patrol led by Lance Corporal Randell D. Herrod, who had been in the country for seven months, alongside Private Thomas R. Boyd Jr., PFC Samuel G. Green, PFC Michael A. Schwarz and Lance Corporal Michael S. Krichten had been in Vietnam for only a month, was sent out from Firebase Ross. The company commander, first lieutenant Lewis Ambort, had ordered the team to avenge the company's casualties and "get some gooks tonight."

The Sơn Thắng hamlet was located 2 miles (3.2 km) southwest of Firebase Ross. The villagers had previously been told to move to a "safe-zone" in the region, but they declined.

== Massacre ==
Upon arriving at Sơn Thắng, the team had encountered three small huts in the area. They had ordered the inhabitants, all women and young children out. Herrod had then ordered the team to fire upon the group, killing them all. The team then proceeded to a second hut and did the same there. Following this, the team had come upon a third hut and proceeded to also kill all of the inhabitants. Overall, seven women and nine children were killed.

Upon returning to the base, the team "reported a fire-fight with 15-20 Việt Cộng" and that six enemies were killed.

The following morning, after advice from Vietnamese civilians, another Marine patrol entered Sơn Thắng and found the dead. Marines Battalion headquarters challenged first lieutenant Ambort's after action report and he eventually admitted to having falsified it. On 20 February, 1st Marine Division commander MG Edwin B. Wheeler reported to III Marine Amphibious Force that a "possible serious incident" had occurred at Sơn Thắng.

== Aftermath ==
On 23 February, Ambort was removed from command and the next day a pre-trial investigation commenced which charged the five Marines on the patrol with murder. Ambort received a letter of reprimand and fine for making a false report. On 15 May, four members of the patrol were court-martialed, while the other member, Krichten agreed to assist the prosecution. The trial began in June. Schwarz was found guilty of 12 counts of premeditated murder and sentenced to life in prison with hard labor and dishonorably discharged. Green was found guilty of 15 counts of unpremeditated murder. He was sentenced to five years in prison with hard labor and dishonorably discharged. Green was surprised by the leniency of his own sentence, remarking "Five years for that?"

Herrod and Boyd were both acquitted. Extremely favorable testimony as character witness was given by Herrod's friend, Oliver North, whose life was saved by him a few months earlier. On 15 December 1970, Major General Charles F. Widdecke reduced each of Schwartz and Green's sentences to one year. They were both released from prison in 1971.

The massacre and its legal implications were written about by Professor Gary D. Solis, a Marine Corps veteran and law professor at Georgetown University in the book Son Thang: An American War Crime.

In 1977, at the urging of Future Secretary of the Navy James Webb, the Marine Corps platoon commander and company commander in the Son Thang area, Green's dishonorable discharge was upgraded to a general discharge. However this was a moot point since Green shot himself in July 1975. Following his acquittal, Herrod was discharged. In 1991, he wrote a book about his court-martial called Blue's Bastards: A True Story of Valor Under Fire. Herrod died on 22 September 2017, at the age of 68.

== See also ==
- List of massacres in Vietnam
- List of war crimes
- United States war crimes
