= Charles F. Widdecke =

U.S. Marine Corps Major General

Charles Fred Widdecke
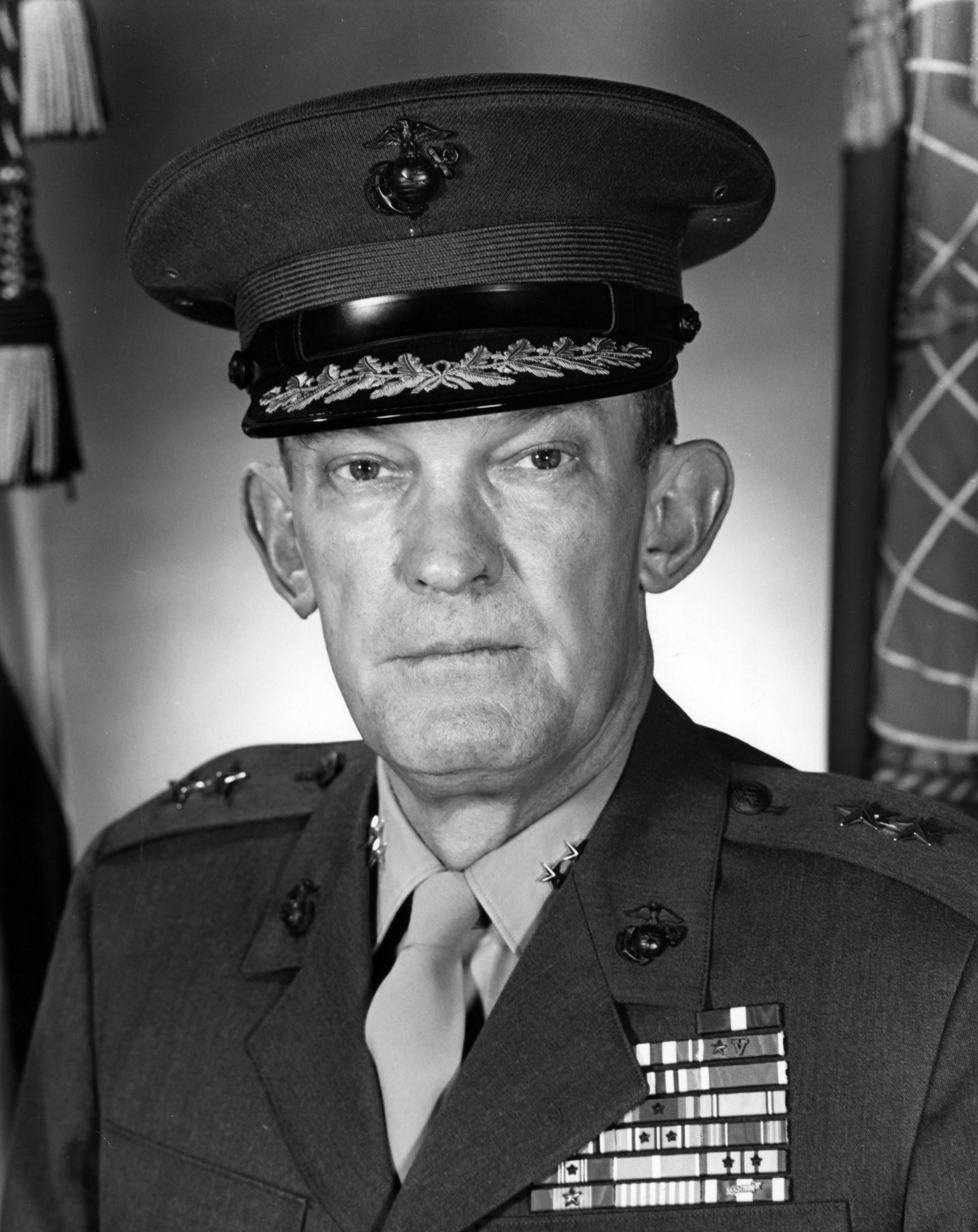
- MG Charles F. Widdecke, USMC
- Born: May 11, 1919; Bryan, Texas, US
- Died: May 13, 1973 (aged 54); La Paz, Mexico
- Military career
- Allegiance: United States of America
- Branch: United States Marine Corps
- Service years: 1941–1971
- Rank: Major general
- Service number: 0-8547
- Commands: I Marine Amphibious Force; 1st Marine Division; Marine Corps Reserve; 5th Marine Regiment; 2nd Battalion, 1st Marines
- Conflicts: World War II: Battle of Eniwetok; Recapture of Guam; Korean War; Vietnam War: Operation Kansas; Operation Colorado; Operation Imperial Lake; Operation Catawba Falls
- Awards: Navy Cross; Distinguished Service Medal; Silver Star; Legion of Merit (2); Purple Heart

Charles Fred Widdecke (May 11, 1919 – May 13, 1973) was a highly decorated officer of the United States Marine Corps who reached the rank of major general. Widdecke received the Navy Cross, the United States military's second-highest decoration awarded for valor in combat, for his actions during the Recapture of Guam in July 1944. He later commanded the 1st Marine Division at the end of Vietnam War.

== Early years and World War II ==
Charles F. Widdecke was born on May 11, 1919, in Bryan, Texas, the son of Henry A. Widdecke and his wife Josephine Baker. He attended high school in Dallas in 1937 and then graduated from the University of Texas at Austin in June 1941 with a Bachelor of Arts degree. While at university, Widdecke was named a Phi Beta Kappa and also enlisted in the Marine Corps Reserve in May 1941.

After graduation, Widdecke attended the Officer Candidate School at the Marine Corps School in Quantico. After completing his courses he was commissioned in the Marine Corps Reserve as a second lieutenant on November 1, 1941. He was then ordered to the Reserve Officer Course, also at Quantico. While he was on this course, the Japanese attacked Pearl Harbor in December 1941.

Widdecke then served as a recruiting officer in San Antonio, Texas, until April 1942, when he joined the 2nd Raider Battalion at San Diego under the command of Lieutenant Colonel Evans Carlson. He was also integrated in the regular Marine Corps during that time.

With the activation of 22nd Marine Regiment under Colonel John T. Walker, Widdecke was promoted to the rank of first lieutenant and appointed commander of Headquarters Company of 1st Battalion. His unit subsequently sailed to Samoa, in the South Pacific, at the end of June 1942 and served as a jungle training unit until February 1944. During that time, Widdecke was promoted to captain and was appointed commander of 1st Battalion's Company C.

The 22nd Marines were ordered to take part in the assault on Eniwetok Atoll on February 22 and Widdecke led his company ashore on Parry Island under heavy enemy mortar and machine gun fire. With his men, he participated in a headlong attack against the entrenched Japanese. For his gallantry in action, Widdecke was decorated with the Silver Star and also received the Navy Unit Commendation.

After the battle, Widdecke and his regiment were ordered to Guadalcanal for rest and further training in April 1944. The 22nd Marines were now attached to the 1st Provisional Marine Brigade under Brigadier General Lemuel C. Shepherd.

The 1st Brigade received orders to take part in the assault on Guam in July 1944. The regiment landed on Guam on July 21 as the left flank of the invasion force. Widdecke and his men secured a position on the beach in the face of strong opposition and prepared for the attack against the fanatic Japanese holding Orote Peninsula and its strategic airfield. Under his leadership, his company sustained the momentum of the subsequent attacks despite the bitterness of the action and the many casualties sustained by his Marines. With his company's advance disrupted by heavy machine-gun, rifle, artillery and mortar barrages, on July 25, Widdecke organized his men led them in a charge through heavy fire. The Japanese position was captured although Widdecke was himself seriously wounded.

Widdecke was decorated with the Navy Cross, the second highest decoration in bravery and was ordered to the field hospital. His wounds required special treatment and he was evacuated to the United States for further hospitalization in September 1944. He remained in the Naval Hospital in San Diego until March 1945.

== Postwar career ==
After recovering from his wounds, for which he received a Purple Heart, Widdecke was promoted to the rank of major. He was subsequently attached to the Division of Reserve at Headquarters Marine Corps. He served under Major General William T. Clement until February 1948, when he was sent to Quantico to attend the Junior Course at Marine Corps School. On completing the course in August 1948, he sailed for Guam, where he was appointed assistant chief of staff for personnel within 1st Provisional Marine Brigade under Brigadier General Edward A. Craig. In April 1949, Widdecke was posted to Fleet Marine Force, Pacific, also at Guam, as assistant chief of staff for personnel.

In June 1950, Widdecke was ordered back to the United States and appointed an instructor in the Tactical Operations Group, Marine Corps Educational Center, at Quantico. While in this capacity, he was promoted to the rank of lieutenant colonel in November 1951. Widdecke remained at Quantico and served as an instructor in the Tactics section, Senior Course from July 1952 to August 1953. This assignment ended, when he was ordered to the Army Command and Staff College at Fort Leavenworth in Kansas for regular courses.

Widdecke graduated in June 1954 and immediately left for Korea, where he assumed command of the 2nd Battalion, 1st Marines, 1st Marine Division. However, the armistice was already in effect and he took part only in the defense of Korean Demilitarized Zone. In January 1955, he was appointed commander of the Headquarters Battalion, 1st Marine Division. Two months later, he returned with the division to Camp Pendleton. His next duties brought him to Washington, D.C., in July 1955, when he was appointed assistant director of Marine Corps Institute and commanding officer of the institute's detachment. Widdecke remained in this capacity only until January 1956, when he was chosen by Commandant Randolph M. Pate as his Aide-de-Camp.

He left Washington in July 1958 and returned to San Diego, where he assumed duties as the commanding officer of the 1st Recruit Training Battalion at Marine Corps Recruit Depot. Widdecke served later as executive officer of Recruit Training Command there and was promoted to the rank of colonel in July 1960. He left California in August 1961 in order to attend Army War College at Carlisle Barracks, Pennsylvania.

He was then ordered to Panama and spent the next three years as head of the military assistance, plans and policy, Joint Staff of United States Southern Command under General Andrew P. O'Meara. During his time there, Widdecke was engaged in the administration of military and economic aid to South American countries and received the Joint Service Commendation Medal for this service.

== Vietnam War ==
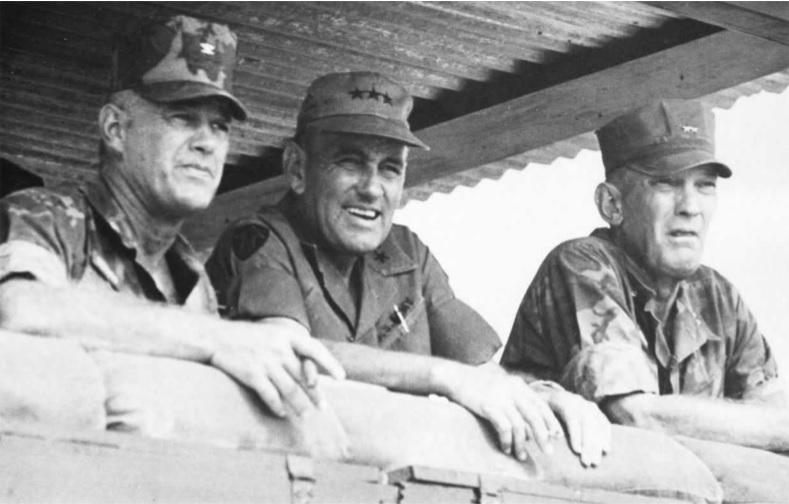
Lieutenant General James W. Sutherland, center, commander of XXIV Corps, looks out from FSB Ryder with Colonel Edmund G. Derning, Jr., left, commander 7th Marines, and Major General Charles F. Widdecke, commander of the 1st Marine Division

In August 1965, Widdecke assumed command of the 5th Marine Regiment at Camp Pendleton and supervised its deployment to Okinawa, Japan in early 1966. The 5th Marines were stationed in Japan until the end of May of that year, when Widdecke led them to Da Nang in South Vietnam. During July 1966, the commanding general of 1st Marine Division, Lewis J. Fields, planned and ordered Operation Colorado. The main objective of this search and destroy operation was to locate and destroy units of the 2nd North Vietnamese Division in the Quảng Nam Province.

He later acted as chief of staff, Task Force X-Ray under Brigadier General William A. Stiles in the Chu Lai area and took part in combat with Vietcong and North Vietnamese troops. Widdecke served in Vietnam until the end of December 1966 and received the Legion of Merit with "V" Device and the Vietnam Gallantry Cross with Bronze Star for his service in Vietnam.

Widdecke was posted to Honolulu, Hawaii, and appointed chief of staff, Fleet Marine Force, Pacific under Lieutenant General Victor H. Krulak. While in this capacity, Widdecke was promoted to the rank of brigadier general.

In September 1968, Widdecke was transferred to the Headquarters Marine Corps in Washington, D.C. and relieved Major General Clifford B. Drake as director of Marine Corps Reserve. During his tenure, he was responsible for the administration of all reserve marine troops, which were used as reinforcements for combat units in Vietnam. He was also promoted to the rank of major general on August 7, 1969, and received his second Legion of Merit for his service in this capacity.

However Widdecke was ordered back to Vietnam in April 1970, when the commander of 1st Marine Division, Edwin B. Wheeler, suffered serious injuries in a helicopter crash. Widdecke was appointed his substitute.

Widdecke oversaw Operation Imperial Lake during September of that year with the task of destroying North Vietnamese troops in Que Son. During that operation the Son Thang massacre occurred. Controversy arose when Widdecke reduced the sentences of the two convicted Marines from five years and life imprisonment respectively to one year of prison. He later led Operation Catawba Falls against communist forces in the same region. Following the operations in Quảng Nam Province in the fall-winter period of 1970, Widdecke began preparing 1st Marine Division for redeployment to the United States.

The 1st Marine Division arrived at Camp Pendleton on April 30, 1971, where it was welcomed by President Richard Nixon and a crowd of 15,000 spectators. Following the President's speech, Widdecke turned over the command to Brigadier General Ross T. Dwyer and personally assumed command of I Marine Amphibious Force, which controlled Marine air and ground units on the West Coast. For his second tour of duty in Vietnam, Widdecke was decorated with Navy Distinguished Service Medal and several decorations from the Government of South Vietnam.

Widdecke retired from the Marine Corps on July 1, 1971, after 30 years of military service. He died on May 13, 1973, while on a trip to La Paz, Mexico, two days after his 54th birthday.

== Decorations ==
Here is the ribbon of General Widdecke:

1st Row	Navy Cross		Navy Distinguished Service Medal	Silver Star
2nd Row	Legion of Merit with Combat "V" and one 5/16" Gold Star	Joint Service Commendation Medal	Purple Heart	Navy Unit Commendation with one star
3rd Row	American Defense Service Medal	American Campaign Medal	Asiatic-Pacific Campaign Medal with two 3/16 inch service stars	World War II Victory Medal
4th Row	National Defense Service Medal with one star	Korean Service Medal	Vietnam Service Medal with four 3/16 inch service stars	National Order of Vietnam, Knight
5th Row	Vietnam Distinguished Service Order, 1st Class	Vietnam Gallantry Cross with Bronze Star	United Nations Korea Medal	Vietnam Campaign Medal

Military offices
Preceded by Edwin B. Wheeler	Commanding General of the 1st Marine Division; April 27, 1970 - April 29, 1971	Succeeded by Ross T. Dwyer
Preceded by Clifford B. Drake	Director of Marine Corps Reserve; September 1968 - April 1970	Succeeded by Donn J. Robertson

== See also ==
- Recapture of Guam
- 1st Marine Division
- List of 1st Marine Division Commanders
