= John F. Sattler =

United States Marine Corps general

John Francis Sattler
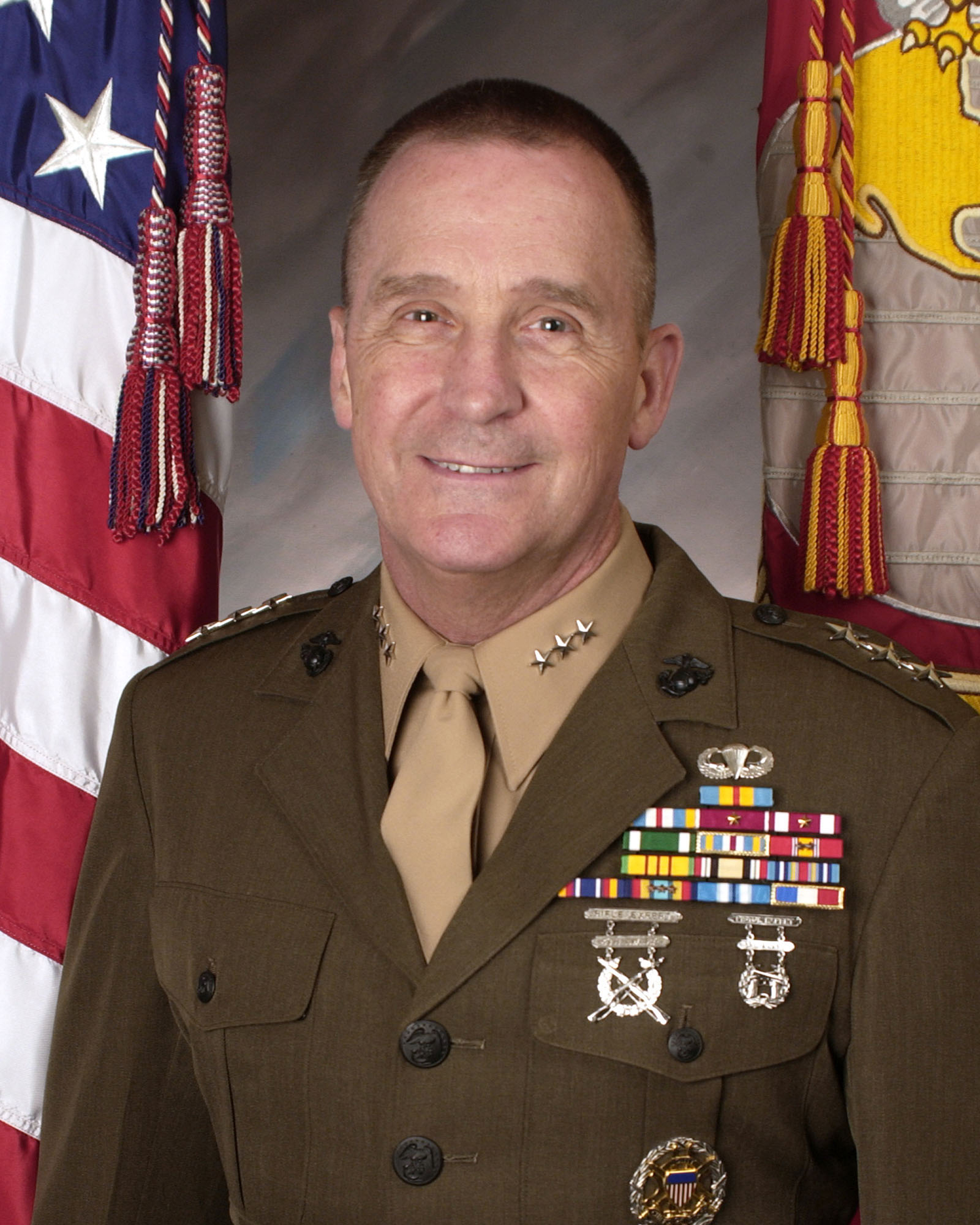
- LtGen John F. Sattler, USMC (Ret.)
- Born: March 21, 1949 (age 77); Monroeville, Pennsylvania, U.S.
- Military career
- Allegiance: United States
- Branch: United States Marine Corps
- Service years: 1971–2008
- Rank: Lieutenant General
- Commands: 2nd Battalion, 4th Marines; 2nd Marine Regiment; 2nd Marine Division; Public Affairs Division; 1st Marine Expeditionary Force
- Conflicts: Operation Iraqi Freedom
- Awards: Defense Distinguished Service Medal; Defense Superior Service Medal; Legion of Merit

John F. Sattler is a retired United States Marine Corps Lieutenant General and was the Director of Strategic Plans and Policy, U.S. Joint Chiefs of Staff. He was also concurrently the United States' representative to the Military Staff Committee of the United Nations.

== Biography ==
Sattler was born on March 21, 1949, and raised in the Pittsburgh suburb of Monroeville, Pennsylvania. He received his commission as second lieutenant in June 1971, following graduation from the United States Naval Academy, where he earned a Bachelor of Science degree in Economics. Sattler was an accomplished wrestler at the Naval Academy, and qualified and wrestled in the NCAA national tournament three different years.

In February 1972, after completing The Basic School (TBS), he was transferred to 2nd Battalion, 4th Marines in Okinawa where he served as a Rifle Platoon Commander. Returning to the United States in 1973, he was assigned to the Reserve Division at Headquarters Marine Corps where he served until his reassignment to Amphibious Warfare School as a student in 1976. Graduating with honors in 1977, he was assigned to The Basic School where he served as a Tactics Instructor, Staff Platoon Commander (SPC), and an Infantry Officer Course Instructor.

Following his tour at Marine Corps Base Quantico, Sattler returned to 2nd Battalion, 4th Marines on Okinawa for duty as Battalion Operations Officer. Upon return to the United States in 1981, he served as Infantry Weapons Procurement Officer at Headquarters Marine Corps until 1985. He graduated with honors from Marine Corps Command and Staff College in 1986, and reported to 2nd Marine Division for his third tour with 2nd Battalion, 4th Marines, this time as the executive officer.

In 1988, Sattler was assigned as Commander, Ground Combat Element for Special Purpose Marine Air-Ground Task Force 4-88. SPMAGTF 4-88 was a ad-hoc collection of units, not part of the usual Marine Expeditionary Unit cycle, that was deployed in the Persian Gulf/Arabian Gulf in 1988, the year of Operation Praying Mantis. He served as J-3, Ground Officer for Operation Solid Shield, a large-scale amphibious training exercise in the Atlantic, which included the 4th and 6th Marine Expeditionary Brigades from the II Marine Expeditionary Force, and Army elements from the XVIII Airborne Corps; the 82nd Airborne Division; and the 101st Airborne Division (Air Assault). Following that assignment, he spent a year at Headquarters Marine Corps before being assigned to the Industrial College of the Armed Forces (ICAF) at the National Defense University, Washington, D.C. He graduated with distinction in June 1991 and reported for duty as Congressional Liaison Officer to the U.S. House of Representatives. He detached from this assignment in August 1995, and took command of 2nd Marine Regiment on August 12, 1995. Sattler relinquished command of 2nd Marines to Colonel Gordon C. Nash on 29 May 1997. He was promoted to brigadier general at his change of command and assumed his duties as Assistant Division Commander, 2nd Marine Division that same day.

In September 1998, Sattler reported to the Joint Staff and assumed duties as the Deputy Director for Operations (Combating Terrorism) J-34. In July 2000, he transferred to Headquarters Marine Corps to assume the duties as the Director, Public Affairs Division. In July 2001, he assumed duties as the Commanding General of 2nd Marine Division at Marine Corps Base Camp Lejeune, North Carolina. In November 2002, he assumed duties as Commander, Combined Joint Task Force – Horn of Africa. In August 2003, he assumed duties as Director of Operations, U.S. Central Command. Sattler was promoted to his current rank and assumed command of I Marine Expeditionary Force on September 12, 2004, during which time he deployed to Iraq. On August 3, 2005, Lieutenant General Sattler also assumed the duties as Commander, U.S. Marine Forces Central Command (MARCENT).

On July 5, 2006, the Pentagon announced Sattler's nomination to be the U.S. Joint Chiefs of Staff's Director of Strategic Plans and Policy (J-5). Lieutenant General Sattler relinquished command of the I Marine Expeditionary Force and Marine Forces Central Command on August 14, 2006. He was assigned as Director for Strategic Plans and Policy, Joint Staff on September 1, 2006. Lieutenant General Sattler retired effective 1 August 2008.

Lieutenant General Sattler (Ret) currently holds the Distinguished Chair of Leadership at the Stockdale Center for Ethical Leadership, located at the United States Naval Academy.

== Awards ==
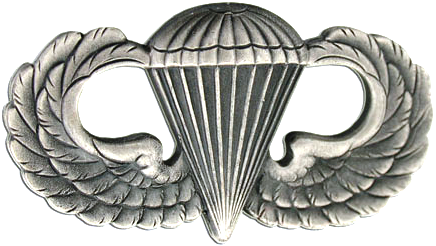

Basic Parachutist Insignia
| | Defense Distinguished Service Medal | Defense Superior Service Medal | |
| Legion of Merit w/ 1 award star | Meritorious Service Medal w/ 1 award star | Navy and Marine Corps Commendation Medal | Joint Meritorious Unit Award |
| National Defense Service Medal w/ 2 service star | Vietnam Service Medal | Iraq Campaign Medal | Global War on Terrorism Expeditionary Medal |
| Global War on Terrorism Service Medal | Navy Sea Service Deployment Ribbon w/ 3 service stars | Arctic Service Ribbon | Philippine Presidential Unit Citation |

== See also ==
- United States Central Command
- U.S. Joint Chiefs of Staff
