= I Marine Expeditionary Force =

Military unit of the United States Marine Corps

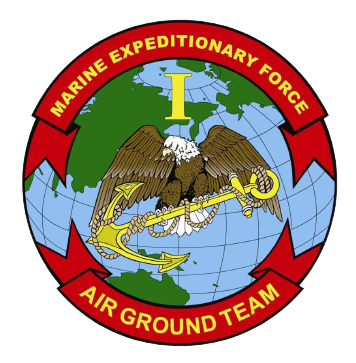
- I MEF insignia
- Active: 8 November 1969 – present
- Country: United States of America
- Branch: United States Marine Corps
- Type: Marine Air-Ground Task Force
- Role: Expeditionary combat force
- Size: 53,000 apprx.
- Part of: U.S. Marine Forces Pacific
- Garrison/HQ: MCB Camp Pendleton, California, U.S.
- Engagements: Operation Desert Storm; Global War on Terrorism; Operation Enduring Freedom; Iraq War; Invasion of Iraq; First Battle of Fallujah; Second Battle of Fallujah

Commanders
- Current commander: LtGen Christian F. Wortman
- Notable commanders: Gen Joseph F. Dunford, Jr., Gen Anthony Zinni, Gen Michael Hagee, Gen James T. Conway, Gen James Mattis, Gen John F. Sattler

The I Marine Expeditionary Force ("I" pronounced "One") is a Marine Air Ground Task Force (MAGTF) of the United States Marine Corps primarily composed of the 1st Marine Division, 3rd Marine Aircraft Wing, and 1st Marine Logistics Group. It is based at Marine Corps Base Camp Pendleton.

I Marine Expeditionary Force is the largest of the three MEFs in the Fleet Marine Force and is often referred to as the "Warfighting MEF" for its consistent involvement and contributions in major armed conflicts. It is presently commanded by Lieutenant General Christian F. Wortman. The deputy commander is Brigadier General Michael R. Nakonieczny.

== Etymology ==
Pronunciation of the Roman numeral designator: As a Roman numeral the capital letter "I", representing one, is properly pronounced as "One". However, there are some who erroneously pronounce the number as either "First", or either intentionally, or unknowingly, pronounce it as "Eye", as in the letter "I".

The convention of using Roman numerals to designate a MEF, which is itself the Marine Corps equivalent organization to an Army corps, stems from the U.S. Army practice that began during the First World War, and continues today, of numbering corps (two or more divisions with supporting troops, and sometimes including separate brigades, regiments, groups, or battalions, all under a unified corps headquarters, usually commanded by a lieutenant general) with Roman numerals. Corps, themselves being the first-level sub-unit of a "field army", or a numbered, or named, army (e.g., First U.S. Army, or the Army of the Potomac).

During the First World War, the 4th Marine Brigade, as part of the U.S. Army 2nd Infantry Division, came under the U.S. Army I Corps, American Expeditionary Forces. With the expansion of the Marine Corps to six divisions and five air wings during the Second World War, the Marine Corps created two "Amphibious Corps", I Marine Amphibious Corps (later re-designated as III Amphibious Corps) and V Amphibious Corps, continuing the custom begun by the Army. Modern Marine Expeditionary Forces, or MEFs (for a time known as Marine Amphibious [italics added] Forces, or MABs) continue the U.S. Marine Corps legacy as corps-equivalent organizations designated by Roman numerals.

== Mission ==
When directed, I MEF deploys and is employed as a Marine Air Ground Task Force (MAGTF) in support of Combatant Commander (COCOM) requirements for contingency response or Major Theater War; with appropriate augmentation, serves as the core element of a Joint Task Force (JTF); prepares and deploys combat-ready MAGTF's to support COCOM presence and crisis response; and supports service and COCOM initiatives as required.

== Lineage ==
NATO Symbol

I

- Activated on 8 November 1969 at Okinawa, Japan as the I Marine Expeditionary Force
- Redesignated on 18 August 1970 as the I Marine Amphibious Force (I MAF)
- Relocated in April 1971 to Camp Pendleton, California
- Redesignated on 5 February 1988 as the "I Marine Expeditionary Force"

== Organization ==
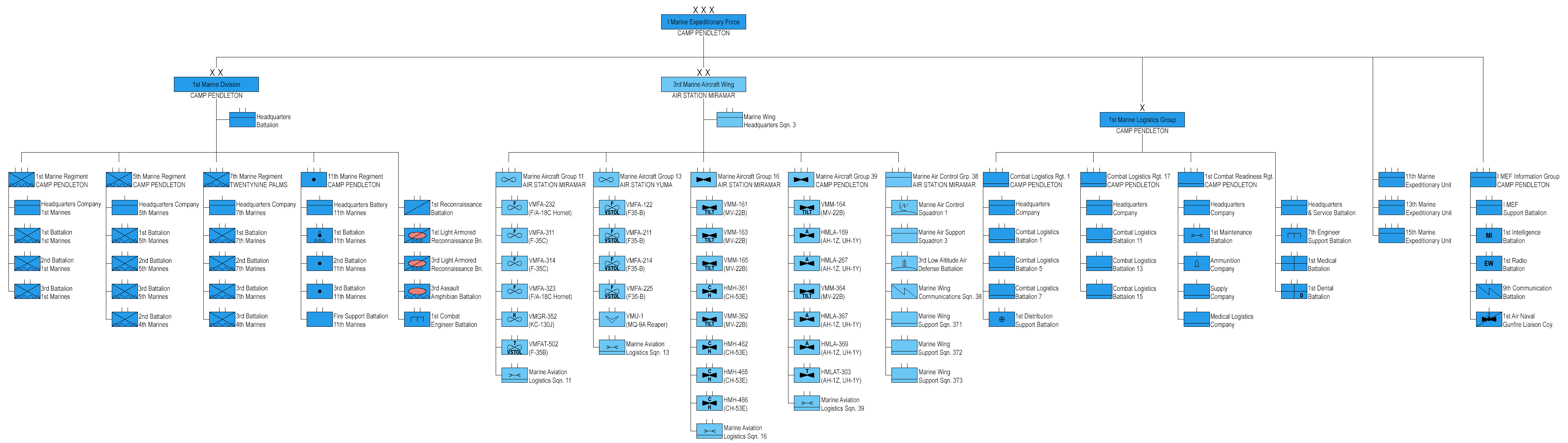
I Marine Expeditionary Force organization as of May 2026 (click to enlarge)

=== Units ===
- Ground combat element: 1st Marine Division
- Aviation combat element: 3rd Marine Air Wing
- Logistics combat element: 1st Marine Logistics Group
- Command element: I Marine Expeditionary Force Information Group
  - I MEF Support Battalion
  - 1st Intelligence Battalion
  - 1st Radio Battalion
  - 9th Communication Battalion
  - 1st Air Naval Gunfire Liaison Company (ANGLICO)
- 11th Marine Expeditionary Unit
- 13th Marine Expeditionary Unit
- 15th Marine Expeditionary Unit

== Recent service ==
I Marine Expeditionary Force during the 2003 invasion of Iraq.

- Operation Desert Shield – Southwest Asia – August 1990 – April 1991
- Operation Desert Storm – Southwest Asia – August 1990 – April 1991
- Operation Restore Hope- December 1992 – May 1993
- Operation Southern Watch – Iraq – January 1998 – February 1998
- Operation Desert Thunder – Iraq – February 1998 – June 1998
- Operation Enduring Freedom – Kuwait, Afghanistan – November 2002
- Operation Iraqi Freedom – Iraq – March 2003 – 2010

== List of commanders ==
From 1969 through 1990 Commanding General, I MEF was normally concurrently assigned as Commanding General, 1st Marine Division and on occasion also Commanding General, Marine Corps Base Camp Pendleton.

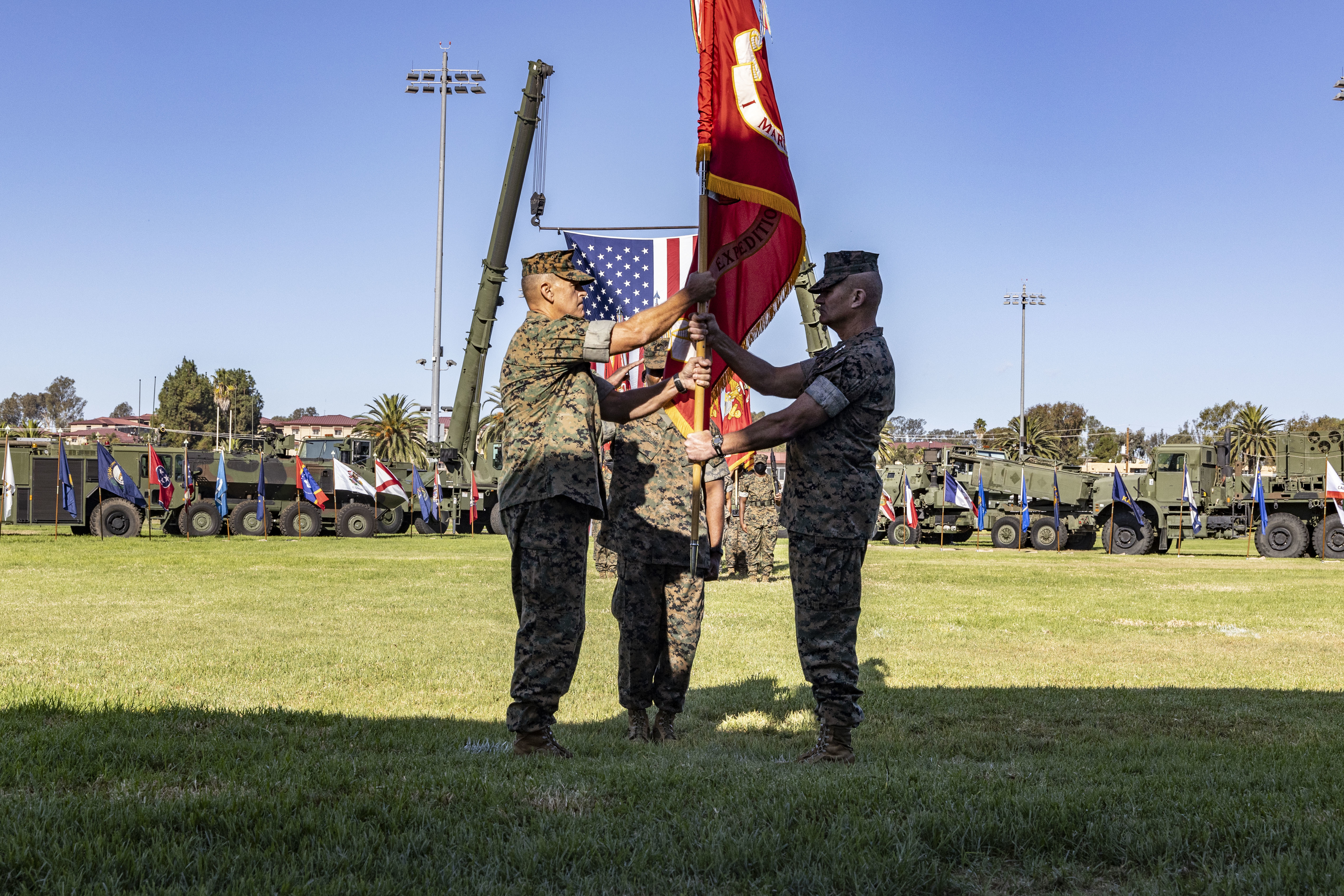
Lt. Gen. Karsten S. Heckl, former commanding general, I Marine Expeditionary Force (MEF), passes the colors to Lt. Gen. George W. Smith Jr., signifying the change of command of I MEF during a formal ceremony on September 23, 2021.

No.	Commander		Term			Ref
No.	Portrait	Name	Took office	Left office	Term length	Ref
-	William K. Jones	Major General; William K. Jones (1916–1998)	Nov 1969	April 1970	180 days	-
-	Charles F. Widdecke	Major General; Charles F. Widdecke (1919–1973)	30 Apr 1971	1 Jul 1971	62 days	-
-	Ross T. Dwyer	Major General; Ross T. Dwyer (1919–2001)	1 Jul 1971	10 Aug 1972	1 year, 40 days	-
-	James L. Day	Major General; James L. Day (1925–1998)	1 Jul 1981	13 Aug 1982	1 year, 43 days	-
-	Ernie Cheatham	Major General; Ernie Cheatham (1929–2014)	13 Aug 1982	13 Jun 1985	2 years, 304 days	-
-	Clyde D. Dean	Major General; Clyde D. Dean (1930–2001)	13 Jun 1985	23 Apr 1986	304 days	-
-	James J. McMonagle	Major General; James J. McMonagle (1932–2024)	14 Aug 1986	19 Jul 1988	1 year, 340 days	-
-	John P. Monahan	Major General; John P. Monahan (1932–2023)	20 Jul 1988	7 Aug 1990	2 years, 18 days	-
-	Walter E. Boomer	Lieutenant General; Walter E. Boomer (born 1938)	15 August 1990	6 September 1991	1 year, 22 days	-
-	Robert B. Johnston	Lieutenant General; Robert B. Johnston (1937–2023)	6 September 1991	July 1993	~1 year, 298 days	-
-	George R. Christmas	Lieutenant General; George R. Christmas (born 1940)	July 1993	July 1994	~1 year, 0 days	-
-	Anthony Zinni	Lieutenant General; Anthony Zinni (born 1943)	July 1994	October 1996	~2 years, 92 days	-
-	Carlton W. Fulford Jr.	Lieutenant General; Carlton W. Fulford Jr. (born 1944)	October 1996	April 1998	~1 year, 182 days	-
-	Bruce B. Knutson Jr.	Lieutenant General; Bruce B. Knutson Jr. (born 1946)	April 1998	7 July 2000	~2 years, 97 days	-
-	Michael W. Hagee	Lieutenant General; Michael W. Hagee (born 1944)	7 July 2000	18 November 2002	2 years, 134 days	
-	James T. Conway	Lieutenant General; James T. Conway (born 1947)	18 November 2002	12 September 2004	1 year, 299 days	-
-	John F. Sattler	Lieutenant General; John F. Sattler (born 1949)	12 September 2004	14 August 2006	1 year, 336 days	
-	James Mattis	Lieutenant General; James Mattis (born 1950)	14 August 2006	5 November 2007	1 year, 83 days	
-	Samuel T. Helland	Lieutenant General; Samuel T. Helland (born 1947/1948)	5 November 2007	16 October 2009	2 years, 348 days	
-	Joseph Dunford	Lieutenant General; Joseph Dunford (born 1953)	16 October 2009	19 October 2010	1 year, 3 days	
-	Thomas D. Waldhauser	Lieutenant General; Thomas D. Waldhauser (born 1955)	19 October 2010	12 September 2012	1 year, 329 days	
-	John A. Toolan	Lieutenant General; John A. Toolan (born 1954)	12 September 2012	11 July 2014	1 year, 302 days	
-	David H. Berger	Lieutenant General; David H. Berger (born 1959)	11 July 2014	27 July 2016	2 years, 16 days	
-	Lewis A. Craparotta	Lieutenant General; Lewis A. Craparotta (born 1959)	27 July 2016	30 July 2018	2 years, 3 days	
-	Joseph Osterman	Lieutenant General; Joseph Osterman (born 1959)	30 July 2018	31 July 2020	2 years, 1 day	
-	Karsten Heckl	Lieutenant General; Karsten Heckl (born 1964)	31 July 2020	23 September 2021	1 year, 54 days	
-	George W. Smith Jr.	Lieutenant General; George W. Smith Jr.	23 September 2021	18 August 2023	1 year, 329 days	
-	Bradford J. Gering	Major General; Bradford J. Gering; Acting	18 August 2023	16 February 2024	182 days	
-	Michael S. Cederholm	Lieutenant General; Michael S. Cederholm	16 February 2024	21 August 2025	1 year, 186 days	
-	Christian F. Wortman	Lieutenant General; Christian F. Wortman	21 August 2025	Incumbent	1 year, 16 days	-
