= 2nd Battalion, 14th Marines =

2nd Battalion, 14th Marine Regiment
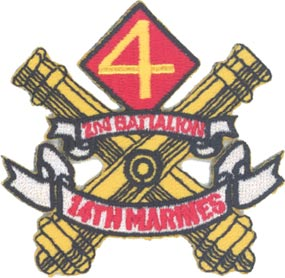
- 2nd Battalion, 14th Marine Regiment insignia
- Active: 26 Mar 1943 – 15 Nov 1945: 1 Jul 1962 – present
- Country: United States of America
- Branch: United States Marine Corps
- Type: Artillery
- Role: Artillery of 4th Marine Division
- Part of: 14th Marine Regiment; 4th Marine Division
- Garrison/HQ: Grand Prairie, Texas
- Engagements: World War II; Battle of Kwajalein; Battle of Tinian; Battle of Iwo Jima; Operation Desert Storm; Global War on Terror; Iraq War

Commanders
- Notable commanders: Clifford B. Drake

2nd Battalion, 14th Marines (2/14) is a reserve artillery battalion comprising three firing batteries and a headquarters battery. The battalion headquarters is in Grand Prairie, Texas. In 2006 the battalion became the first fully operational HIMARS battalion in the Marine Corps. Fox Battery, based in Oklahoma City, Oklahoma. was deployed in July 2007 in support of Operation Iraqi Freedom, and has the distinction of being the first Marine Corps HIMARS battery to deploy into combat.

== Mission ==
Augment and reinforce active Marine forces in time of war, national emergency or contingency operations.

== Current units ==
- Headquarters Battery – Grand Prairie, Texas
- Battery D (Delta Battery) – El Paso, Texas
- Battery F (Fox Battery) – Oklahoma City, Oklahoma
- Battery K (Kilo Battery) – Huntsville, Alabama

== History ==
The battalion was commissioned on 26 March 1943 at Marine Corps Base Camp Pendleton, California. On 19 August 1943, 2/14 was assigned to the 14th Marine Regiment. During January 1944, 2/14 was deployed to the Marshall Islands and participated in the following World War II Pacific campaigns: Battle of Kwajalein, Battle of Tinian and the Battle of Iwo Jima. They were redeployed during October 1945 to Camp Pendleton, California and deactivated on 15 November 1945.

The 2/14 was reactivated on 1 July 1962 at NAS Dallas in Grand Prairie, Texas. In February 1966, 2/14 was assigned to the 4th Marine Division as part of Marine Forces Reserve. They relocated to a standalone reserve facility near downtown Fort Worth, Texas in 1988. In March 2000 they returned to Grand Prairie, Texas at the Grand Prairie Armed Forces Reserve Complex.

The battalion participated in Operation Desert Shield and Operation Desert Storm, Southwest Asia, November 1990 – April 1991. The battalion has additionally deployed batteries in support of Operation Iraqi Freedom from 2001 - 2007, Operation Enduring Freedom 2011, Operation Freedom Sentinel with Task Force Southwest 19-2 in 2019, and Operations Allies Welcome, and Operation Allies Refuge in 2021.

== Unit awards ==
A unit citation or commendation is an award bestowed upon an organization for the action cited. Members of the unit who participated in said actions are allowed to wear on their uniforms the awarded unit citation. 2nd Battalion, 14th Marines has been presented with the following awards:

Streamer	Award	Year(s)	Additional Info
	Presidential Unit Citation Streamer	1944, 2021	Saipan & Tinian, Kabul Afghanistan
	Navy Unit Commendation Streamer with one Bronze Star	1945	Iwo Jima
	Meritorious Unit Commendation Streamer	1990–91	Southwest Asia
	Asiatic-Pacific Campaign Streamer with four Bronze Stars		Kwajalein, Saipan, Tinian, Iwo Jima
	World War II Victory Streamer	1941–1945	Pacific War
	National Defense Service Streamer with two Bronze Stars	1961–1974, 1990–1995, 2001–present	Vietnam War, Gulf War, war on terrorism
	Iraq Campaign Streamer	2007-2008	
	Global War on Terrorism Expeditionary Streamer	2001-2021	
	Global War on Terrorism Service Streamer	2001–2021	

== See also ==
- List of United States Marine Corps battalions
- Organization of the United States Marine Corps

== Notes ==
- Brown, Ronald J. (1990). A Brief History of the 14th Marines (PDF). Washington, D.C.: History & Museums Divisions, Headquarters United States Marine Corps.
- Rottman, Gordon L. (2002). U.S. Marine Corps World War II Order of Battle – Ground and Air Units in the Pacific War. Westport, Connecticut: Greenwood Press. ISBN 0313319065.
