= 1st Battalion, 14th Marines =

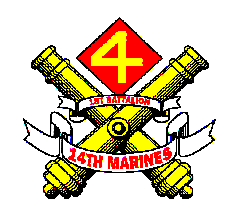
- 1/14 Insignia
- Active: May 1, 1943 – March 24, 2007
- Country: United States of America
- Branch: United States Marine Corps
- Type: Artillery
- Role: Provide fire support to the 4th Marine Division
- Part of: Unit is decommissioned
- Nickname: At the Ready
- Mottos: "Servire, Defensor, Vindico" (to serve, to protect, to deliver)
- Engagements: World War II: Battle of Kwajalein; Battle of Saipan; Battle of Tinian; Battle of Iwo Jima; Global War on Terror: Operation Iraqi Freedom

Commanders
- Notable commanders: Clifford B. Drake

1st Battalion 14th Marines (1/14) was a reserve artillery battalion comprising three firing batteries and a headquarters battery. The battalion was based in Alameda, California. Its primary weapon system was the M198 Howitzer. It was part of the 14th Marine Regiment of the 4th Marine Division.

== Mission ==
To provide artillery support to a maneuver element or reinforcing fire to another artillery organization.

== Subordinate units ==
Name	Location
Headquarters and Service Battery	Alameda, California
Battery A (Alpha Battery)	Spokane, Washington
Battery B (Bravo Battery)	Pico Rivera, California
Battery C (Charlie Battery)	Jackson, Mississippi and Waterloo, Iowa

== History ==
=== World War II ===
The battalion was activated on May 1, 1943, at Camp Lejune, North Carolina. It relocated during August 1943 to Camp Pendleton, California and was assigned to the 4th Marine Division. During World War II it participated in the Battles of Kwajalein, Saipan, Tinian and Iwo Jima. 1/14 redeployed in October 1945 to Camp Pendleton and was deactivated on November 15 of the same year.

=== Reactivation and name changes ===
The battalion was reactivated on February 1, 1966, at Treasure Island, San Francisco, California, as Headquarters Battery, 14th Marines and assigned to the 4th Marine Division, Fleet Marine Force, Marine Forces Reserve. It was redesignated February 1, 1967, as Headquarters Battery, 3rd Field Artillery Group, Force Troops. It was redesignated again on September 1, 1979, as Headquarters Battery, 5th Battalion, 14th Marines and finally on October 1, 1985, as 1st Battalion, 14th Marines.

=== 1990s ===
The battalion was called to active duty in support of Operation Desert Shield on December 10, 1990. HQ Battery from Treasure Island, CA, "A" Battery from Spokane, WA, and "B" Battery from Pico Rivera, CA mobilized to Camp Lejeune, NC and the battalion was sent to Norway in support of Exercise Battle Griffin. The Persian Gulf War ended before the unit could be redeployed to the Middle East theater of operations. The battalion returned home in July 1991. "C" Battery, 1st Battalion 14th Marines from Jackson, Mississippi, was activated separately on 10 December 1990 in support of Operation Desert Shield and deployed to Camp Pendleton, California and then to Camp Foster, Okinawa, Japan to await final orders to deploy to the Persian Gulf. Similarly, those orders never came. The Marines from Charlie Battery returned home to Jackson, Mississippi, in August 1991. HQ Battery relocated during February 1992 to Alameda NAS from Treasure Island.

=== Global war on terror ===
The battalion was mobilized in June 2005 in support of Operation Iraqi Freedom and for the deployment redesignated as Task Force MP.

=== Decommissioning ===
1st Battalion, 14th Marines was deactivated on March 24, 2007, and redesignated the 4th Force Reconnaissance Headquarters.

== See also ==
- List of United States Marine Corps battalions
- Organization of the United States Marine Corps
