= Adolph G. Schwenk =

United States Marine Corps general (1922–2004)

Adolph Glaser Schwenk
- Born: March 26, 1922; New York City, New York, U.S.
- Died: March 24, 2004 (aged 81) Fayetteville, North Carolina, U.S.
- Buried: Arlington National Cemetery; Arlington, Virginia
- Allegiance: United States of America
- Branch: United States Marine Corps
- Service years: 1944–1982
- Rank: Lieutenant General
- Commands: 1st Marine Division; 3rd Marine Division
- Conflicts: World War II; Chinese Civil War: Operation Beleaguer; Korean War; Vietnam War
- Awards: Navy Distinguished Service Medal; Legion of Merit (2)

Adolph Glaser Schwenk (March 26, 1922 – March 24, 2004) was a United States Marine with the rank of Lieutenant General.

== Early life and World War II ==
Adolph G. Schwenk was born on March 26, 1922, in New York City. He enlisted in the Marine Corps in September 1942 while attending Wesleyan University. He subsequently attended Yale University under the V-12 Navy College Training Program before attending MCRD Parris Island in February 1944.

Commissioned as a second lieutenant on July 12 of that year, Schwenk was eventually sent to the Pacific Theater and assigned to the 3rd Battalion, 25th Marines, 4th Marine Division. Schwenk was promoted to first lieutenant in January 1946 and was assigned to occupation duty in China with the 1st Marine Division.

== Korea and Vietnam ==
Lieutenant Schwenk returned to the United States in December 1946 and served in several billets over the next few years. He eventually deployed to Korea as a captain and remained there until August 1953. He was awarded the Legion of Merit for his service in Korea. After the Korean War, he served at a number of locations, including Rome, Italy, and Marine Corps Air Station Iwakuni, Japan. In July 1967, he was promoted to colonel.

In February 1968, Colonel Schwenk took command of the 27th Marines in Vietnam. He remained in Vietnam until April 1969 and was awarded a second Legion of Merit. Upon his return to the United States, he attended the Army War College, graduating in June 1970.

== Later career and life ==
In August 1971, he was promoted to brigadier general and became the executive officer of the 1st Marine Division. From August 1972 to April 1973, brigadier general Schwenk was the commanding general of the 1st Marine Division. He was promoted to major general in 1975 and assumed command of the 3rd Marine Division from July 1977 to July 1978. Promoted to lieutenant general in 1978, he assumed his final position as commanding general of Fleet Marine Force, Atlantic in October 1980. General Schwenk ultimately retired from the Marines on July 1, 1982, and was awarded the Navy Distinguished Service Medal for his service.

He and his wife settled in the town of Pinehurst, North Carolina. Adolph G. Schwenk died on March 24, 2004, at Womack Army Medical Center in Fayetteville. He was buried in Arlington National Cemetery in Arlington, Virginia.

== See also ==
- List of 1st Marine Division commanders
- List of 3rd Marine Division commanders

Military offices
Preceded by George W. Smith	Commanding General of the 3rd Marine Division; July 17, 1977 – July 10, 1978	Succeeded by Calhoun J. Killeen
Preceded by Ross T. Dwyer	Commanding General of the 1st Marine Division; August 11, 1972 – April 30, 1973	Succeeded by Kenneth J. Houghton
