= Ross T. Dwyer =

U.S. Marine Corps Major General

Ross Thomas Dwyer
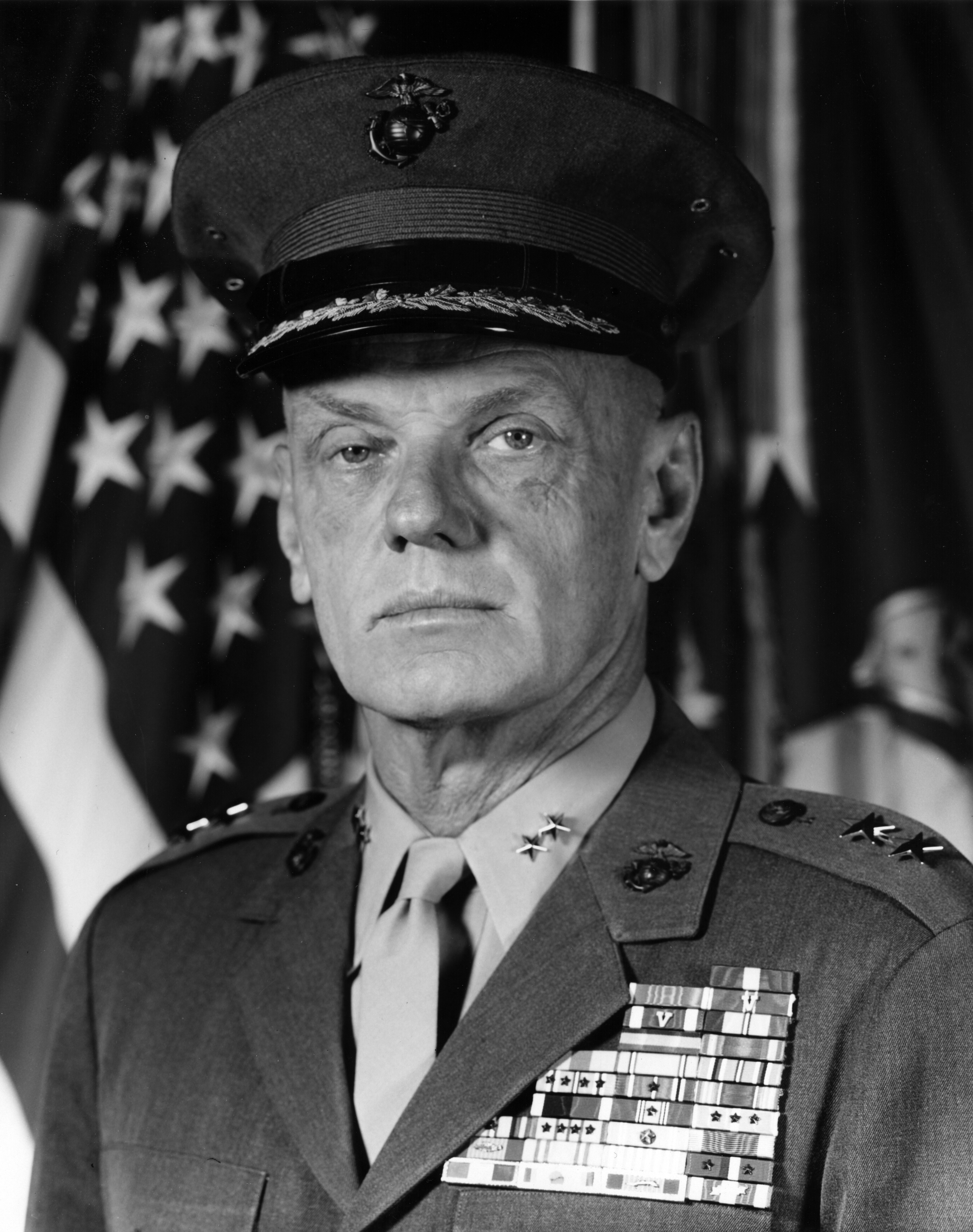
- Major General Ross T. Dwyer, USMC
- Born: July 20, 1919; Honolulu, Territory of Hawaii
- Died: October 8, 2001 (aged 82); Riverside, California, U.S.
- Military career
- Allegiance: United States of America
- Branch: United States Marine Corps
- Service years: 1941–1974
- Rank: Major general
- Commands: 2nd Battalion, 6th Marines; 1st Marine Regiment; 5th Marine Division; 1st Marine Division; I Marine Amphibious Force
- Conflicts: World War II: Guadalcanal Campaign; Gilbert and Marshall Islands campaign; Battle of the Philippine Sea; Battle of Iwo Jima; Korean War; Vietnam War: Tet Offensive; Operation Taylor Common
- Awards: Distinguished Service Medal; Legion of Merit (3); Bronze Star

Ross Thomas Dwyer (July 20, 1919 – October 8, 2001) was a United States Marine Corps major general who retired in 1974 after over 32 years of service. MajGen Dwyer served in combat in World War II, the Korean War, and in the Vietnam War. His commands included the 5th Marine Division and the 1st Marine Division.

== Biography ==
Ross T. Dwyer was born in Honolulu, Territory of Hawaii, on July 20, 1919. He graduated from Punahou School in Honolulu in 1937. He studied economics at Stanford University, where he was a member of the Chi Psi fraternity, earning his Bachelor of Arts degree in 1942. In 1941, while at Stanford, he joined the United States Marine Corps Reserve. He was commissioned a Marine Corps second lieutenant on September 26, 1942.

=== World War II ===
During World War II, Dwyer served as a 5-inch battery and machine gun officer with the Marine detachment aboard the USS South Dakota in both the European Theater of Operations and the Pacific Theater, participating in four major naval campaigns. After his sea duty, he became a tank instructor at Camp Pendleton, California.

=== Post-war ===
Immediately following the war, Dwyer returned to Hawaii as the commanding officer of the Marine Barracks, Naval Air Station (NAS) Kaneohe Bay and then at the Naval Air Facility (NAF) Johnson Islands (Pacific Ocean). He next served briefly with the 2nd Marines as a company commander.

In February 1948, he entered the Amphibious Warfare School, Junior Course, Marine Corps Schools, Quantico, Virginia. Upon graduation in August 1948, he joined the 2nd Marine Division, where he served consecutively as a company commander with the 8th Marines and 6th Marines; as officer in charge (OIC), Division NCO School; S-3, 2nd Battalion, 6th Marines; and S-3, 2nd Battalion, 8th Marines. He was promoted to major in January 1951, and was transferred to Headquarters Marine Corps in June of that year, where he served as head, Enlisted Promotion Section, Personnel Department.

=== Korean War ===
In September 1952, Dwyer was ordered to Korea. During the Korean War, he served as executive officer (XO) of the USMC Advisory Group to the 1st Korean Marine Corps Regiment; As S-3, 5th Marines; Assistant G-3 (Ops) and Assistant G-3 (Plans) for the 1st Marine Division.

=== After Korea ===
Dwyer returned to the States in August 1953 and served for two years as an aide to the Joint Chiefs of Staff. In December 1955, he was promoted to lieutenant colonel.

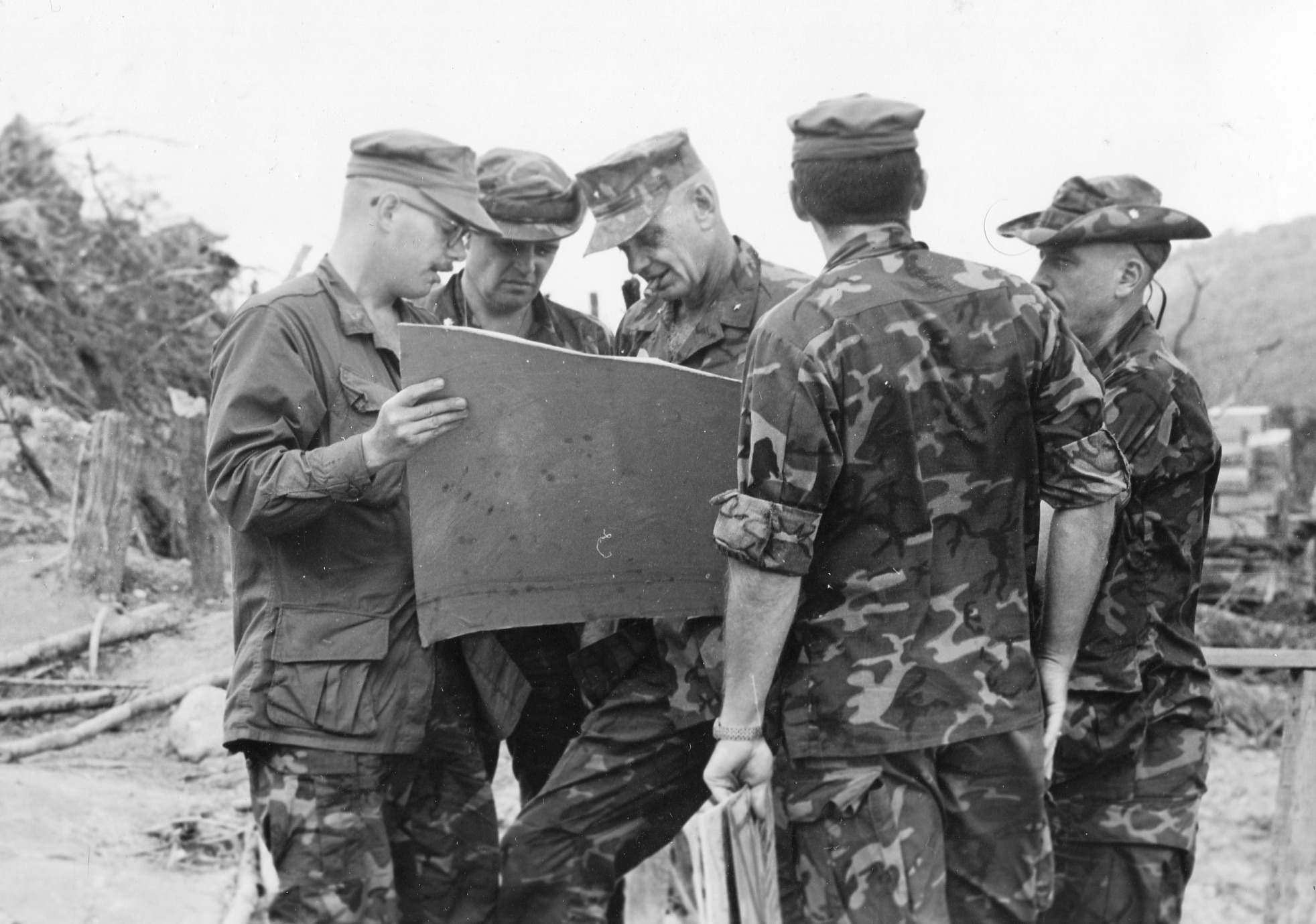
Brigadier General Ross T. Dwyer, Commanding General of Task Force Yankee receives a situation briefing from officers of 3rd Marines during Operation Taylor Common, 1969.

From 1955 to 1958, Dwyer served as an instructor at Marine Corps Schools, Ouantico, followed by a tour of duty in London on the staff of CINCNELM/CINCUSNAVEUR, After attending the Armed Forces Staff College, he joined the 2nd Marine Division and assumed command of the 2nd Battalion, 6th Marines as Assistant Force Marine Officer, Amphibious Plans and operations officer. While in this assignment he participated in contingency operations in Lebanon in 1958. He was deployed to the U.S. 6th Fleet as commander, Task Force 62 (Landing Force) and later was deployed as the commanding officer, Battalion Landing Team (BLT) 2/6 during the Cuban contingency operations.

In December 1962, LtCol Dwyer became Asst G-1 of the 2nd Marine Division. Ordered overseas in June 1963, he joined the 1st Marine Aircraft Wing (1st MAW) in Japan as Assistant G-1, later becoming G-1. While serving in this capacity, he was promoted to colonel in July 1964.

He returned to U.S. in July 1964. From September 1, 1964, to late January 1965, was assigned as head, Western Region Team, Joint Plans Group, DC/s, Plans and Programs, at Headquarters Marine Corps. From February 1965 to June 1967, Dwyer served as USMC Aide to the Secretary of the Navy (SecNav). In May 1968, Col Dwyer graduated from the National War College, Washington, D.C.

=== Vietnam War ===
In June 1968, Dwyer reported to the Republic of Vietnam, and was assigned as the CO, 1st Marines, 1st Marine Division (Reinforced), FMF. He was promoted to brigadier general on August 14, 1968, and subsequently served as assistant division commander, 1st Marine Division; Commanding General (CG) Task Force Yankee, 1st Marine Division; and finally as G-3, III Marine Amphibious Force.

=== Post-Vietnam ===
Following his return to the States in late June 1969, Dwyer commanded the 5th Marine Division until it was deactivated in December 1969. He then commanded the 5th Marine Expeditionary Brigade, which was redesignated the 5th Marine Amphibious Brigade on September 1, 1967.

On April 30, 1971, Dwyer became commanding general of 1st Marine Division at Camp Pendleton, California, and also assumed additional duties as commanding general of I Marine Amphibious Force. Dwyer was promoted to major general in August 1971.

After leaving the 1st Marine Division on August 10, 1972, he served as deputy director, Joint Staff, Joint Chiefs of Staff, Washington, D.C., until February 1973, when he became deputy commander, Fleet Marine Force, Atlantic. He received a second gold star in lieu of a third award of the Legion of Merit upon his retirement on September 1, 1974.

Dwyer died on October 8, 2001, at the age of 82.

== Awards ==
His personal decorations include:

| 1st Row | Navy Distinguished Service Medal | | | |
| 2nd Row | Legion of Merit with two 5/16" Gold Stars | Bronze Star Medal with Combat "V" | Joint Service Commendation Medal | Navy Commendation Medal with Combat "V" |
| 3rd Row | Combat Action Ribbon | Navy Presidential Unit Citation | Navy Unit Commendation with one star | Marine Corps Expeditionary Medal |
| 4th Row | American Defense Service Medal | American Campaign Medal | European-African-Middle Eastern Campaign Medal with one 3/16 inch service star | Asiatic-Pacific Campaign Medal with seven 3/16 inch service stars |
| 5th Row | World War II Victory Medal | Navy Occupation Service Medal | National Defense Service Medal with one star | Korean Service Medal with three 3/16 inch service stars |
| 6th Row | Armed Forces Expeditionary Medal with one star | Vietnam Service Medal with four 3/16 inch service stars | Order of Military Merit, Chungmu Cordon Medal | Korean Hua Rang Medal |
| 7th Row | National Order of Vietnam, Knight | Vietnam Gallantry Cross with Palm | Philippine Republic Presidential Unit Citation | Korean Presidential Unit Citation |
| 8th Row | Vietnam Gallantry Cross Unit Citation | Philippine Liberation Medal with two stars | United Nations Korea Medal | Vietnam Campaign Medal |

== See also ==
- 1st Marine Division
- 5th Marine Division

Military offices
| Preceded by Charles F. Widdecke | Commanding General of the 1st Marine Division; April 30, 1971 - August 10, 1972 | Succeeded by Adolph G. Schwenk |
| Preceded by Donn J. Robertson | Commanding General of the 5th Marine Division; July 1, 1969 - November 26, 1969 | Succeeded by Unit deactivated |
