= Edwin B. Wheeler =

U.S. Marine Corps general (1918–1985)

Edwin Bliss Wheeler
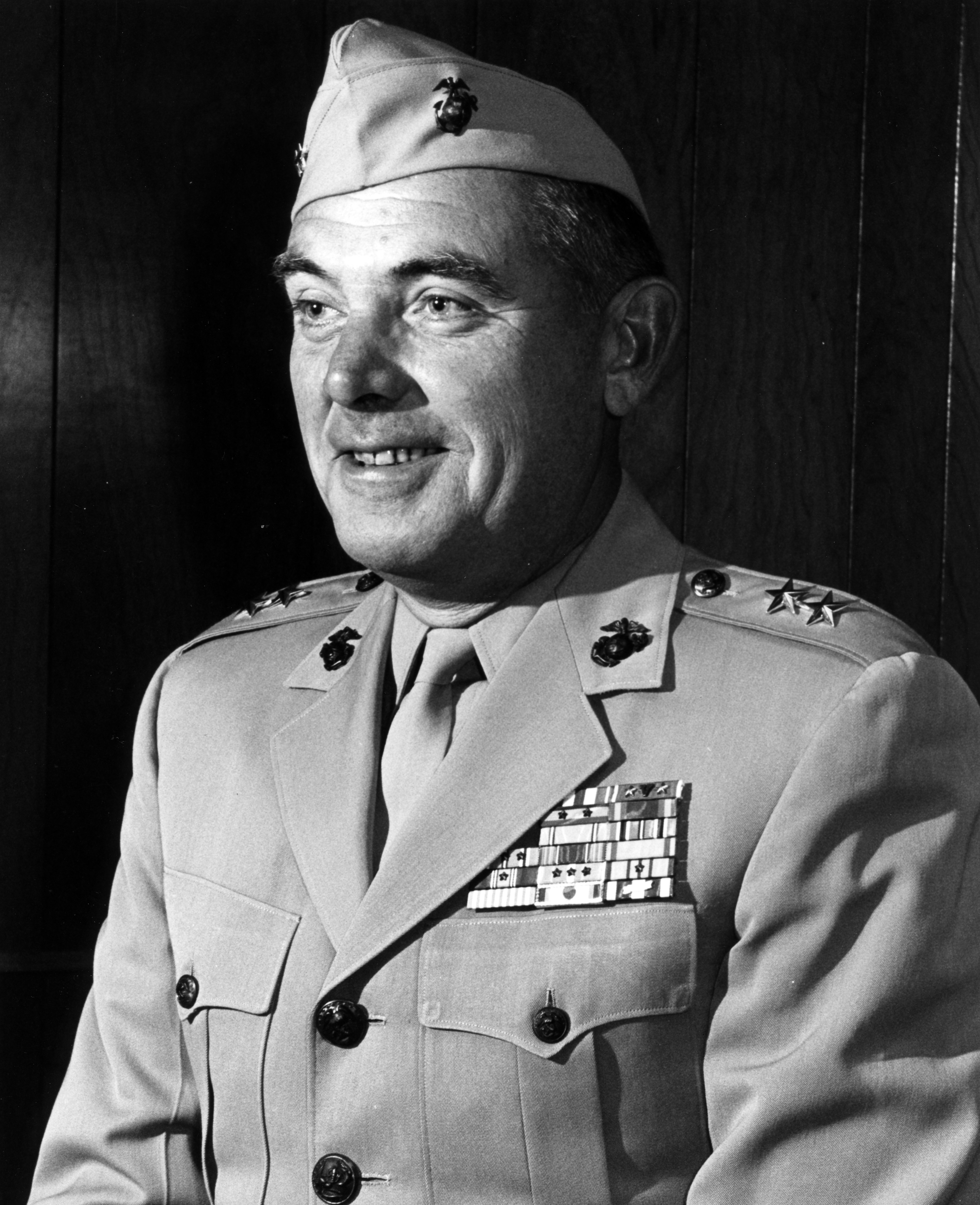
- MG Edwin B. Wheeler, USMC
- Born: March 17, 1918; Port Chester, New York, US
- Died: October 14, 1985 (aged 67); Dallas, Texas, US
- Burial place: Arlington National Cemetery
- Military career
- Allegiance: United States of America
- Branch: United States Marine Corps
- Service years: 1941–1972
- Rank: Major general
- Service number: 0-7807
- Commands: 1st Marine Division; 2nd Marine Division; 3rd Marine Regiment; 1st Battalion, 5th Marines; The Basic School
- Conflicts: World War II: Battle of Tulagi; Battle of Guadalcanal; Battle of Edson's Ridge; Actions along the Matanikau; New Georgia Campaign; Korean War: Battle for Outpost Vegas; Vietnam War
- Awards: Distinguished Service Medal; Silver Star; Legion of Merit (5)

Edwin Bliss Wheeler (March 17, 1918 – October 14, 1985) was a highly decorated officer of the United States Marine Corps with the rank of major general. He served with famous Marine Raiders during World War II and earned the Silver Star for gallantry in action. Wheeler served two tours of duty in Vietnam, as commanding officer of 3rd Marine Regiment in 1964–1965 and later as commanding general of 1st Marine Division in 1969–1970.

== Early career and World War II ==
Edwin B. Wheeler was born on March 17, 1918, in Port Chester, New York, and later attended local Port Chester High School in 1935. He then enrolled Williams College in Williamstown, Massachusetts, and graduated in 1939 with Bachelor of Arts degree. Wheeler then went to study on New York University School of Law, but left the studies in order to serve with the United States Marine Corps. He enlisted as private in March 1941 and was attached to the Officer Candidates School at Quantico, Virginia. Wheeler completed the training on May 29 of that year and was commissioned second lieutenant on the same date.

After subsequent brief service at Quantico Base, Wheeler was attached to 1st Battalion, 5th Marines under the command of famous marine, Lieutenant Colonel Merritt A. Edson. Following the debate over the creation of own marine elite units, Commandant of the Marine Corps Thomas Holcomb ordered creation of two raider battalions. Edson and his battalion were redesignated 1st Separate Battalion in January 1942 and subsequently 1st Marine Raider Battalion one month later.

Wheeler was appointed rifle platoon leader and took part in the extensive amphibious training and preparation for deployment to the Pacific area. He sailed for Samoa in July 1942 and after brief stay there, 1st Marine Raiders embarked for Tulagi at the beginning of August 1942. They landed in the morning of August 7 and encountered the Japanese garrison of 3rd Special Naval Landing Forces. The battle lasted only for two days and Wheleer participated in the annihilation of 307 Japanese from total 310 on Tulagi (only three Japanese were taken prisoners).

The 1st Raider Battalion then took part in the mopping up operations on Tulagi and subsequently was ordered to the action on Guadalcanal on September 8. Wheeler also got promotion to the rank of first lieutenant at that time. He participated in the Battle of Edson's Ridge and Actions along the Matanikau river and was appointed commander of rifle company.

Following the Guadalcanal campaign, Wheeler led a long-range amphibious reconnaissance patrol of the 1st Raider Battalion on the island of Kolombangara, New Georgia and spent almost three weeks behind enemy lines. He gathered important intell from his mission and was decorated with the Legion of Merit with Combat "V" for his service.

Wheeler then retook command of his rifle company and led it to the action during New Georgia Campaign on July 10, 1943, when he directed his company with such skill and aggressiveness that heavy casualties were inflicted on the enemy and seven of their machine guns were captured. On 20 July 1943, commanding a composite company, he directed the company with such courage heavy casualties were again inflicted on the enemy. Wheeler subsequently promoted to the rank of captain and received the Silver Star for gallantry in action in New Georgia.

He was then ordered to the United States and spent remained of the war at the staff of Marine Corps Schools, Quantico. Wheeler was also promoted to the rank of major, while served there.

== Postwar service ==
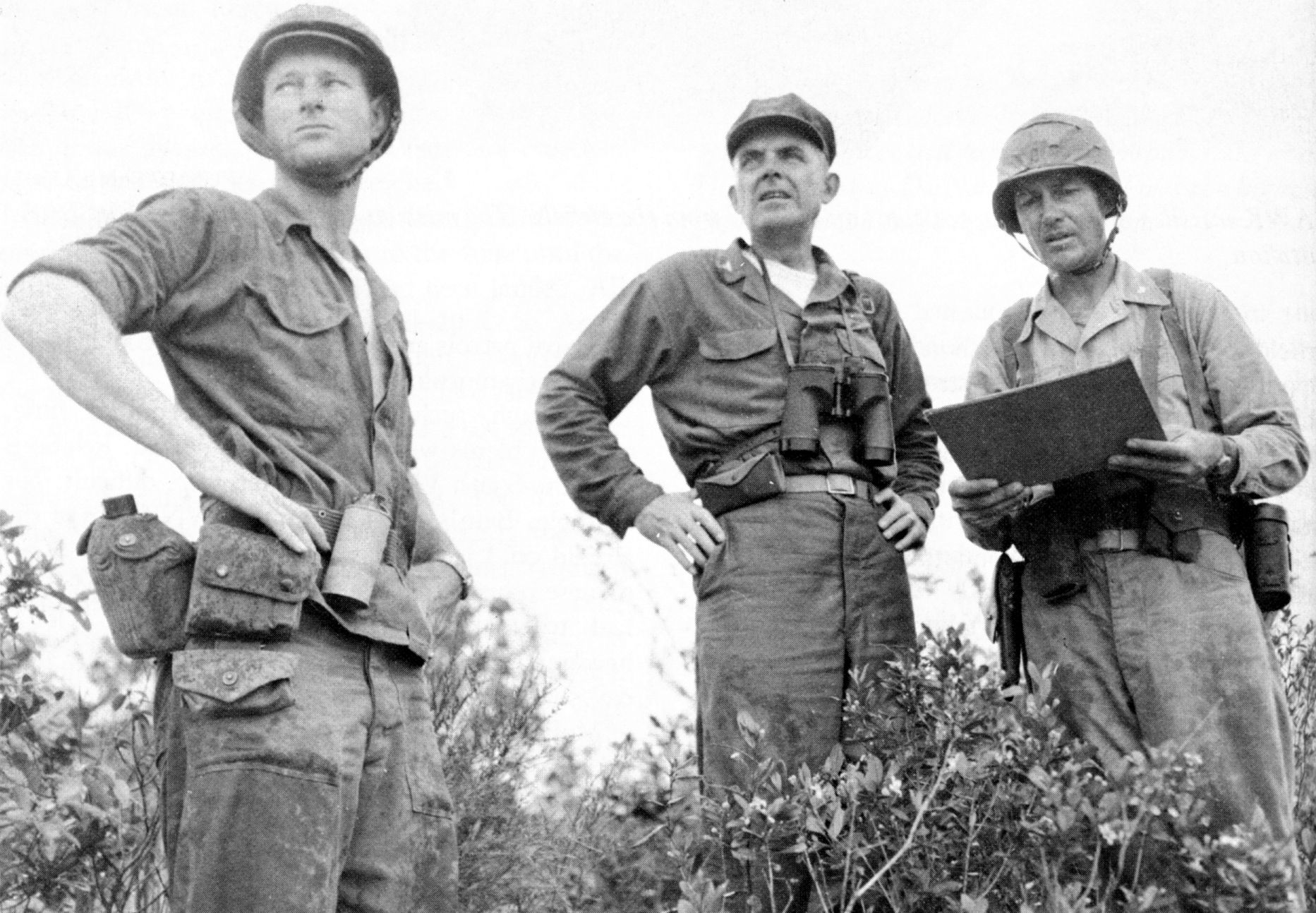
Colonel Edwin B. Wheeler, Commanding Officer, 3d Marines (center), discusses the tactical situation with Lieutenant Colonel David A. Clement, commanding officer of the newly arrived 2d Battalion, 3d Marines (right). The other officer in the picture is First Lieutenant Marx H. Branum, the forward air controller for the battalion.

Upon the end of World War II, Wheeler served as assistant operations officer with 1st Special Marine Brigade at Camp Lejeune, North Carolina and then for three years with the staff of Fleet Marine Force Pacific during Chinese Civil War. Wheeler returned stateside in June 1949 and assumed duties with the Division of Plans and Policies at Headquarters Marine Corps, where he served until June 1952. He was also promoted to the rank of lieutenant colonel during that time.

He was then ordered to South Korea and appointed commanding officer of 1st Amphibian Tractor Battalion and took part in the combat against Chinese communists on East Central Front. Wheeler then assumed command of 1st Battalion, 5th Marines, before relieving Lieutenant Colonel Jonas M. Platt as executive officer of 5th Marine Regiment. In this capacity, Wheeler took part in the engagements within Reno-Carson-Vegas Complex during spring 1953 and finally returned to the United States in May 1953. He was decorated with his second Legion of Merit with Combat "V" for his service in Korea.

Following his return stateside, Wheeler was attached to the staff of Marine Corps Schools, Quantico under Lieutenant General Clifton B. Cates and also attended Senior Course there. He remained in Quantico for next three years and subsequently was ordered to Paris, France for study at NATO Defense College. Wheeler graduated in February 1957 and then served at the Headquarters of Supreme Headquarters Allied Powers Europe until June 1959.

Wheeler then returned to the United States and following the promotion to the rank of colonel in July 1959, he was ordered to Washington, D.C., for duty as Aide-de-camp to the United States Secretary of the Navy. He served as aide to three secretaries: William B. Franke, John B. Connally, Fred Korth and remained in that capacity until August 1962. Following this period, Wheeler remained in Washington and served as commanding officer of Marine Corps Institute and local Marine barracks until July 1964.

== Vietnam war era ==
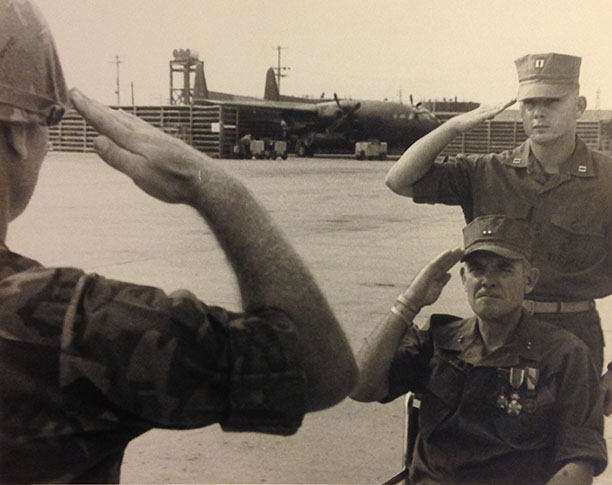
MG Edwin B. Wheeler departs Vietnam for treatment in the U.S.

Colonel Wheeler subsequently traveled to Okinawa, Japan, where assumed command of 3rd Marine Regiment on August 1, 1964. On the following day, the Gulf of Tonkin incident occurred and it became obvious that the Marines would respond soon. Wheeler supervised the preparation of the regiment for combat deployment and subsequently led his regiment to Da Nang at the beginning of April 1965. In addition to the Da Nang area, Wheeler and his troops was responsible for the defense of Phu Bai, where they encountered Vietcong (VC) units.

The 3rd Marines then were stationed at Da Nang Airfield and repelled several VC attacks. Wheeler was ordered back to the States in September 1965 and also received third Legion of Merit with Combat "V" for his service in Vietnam.

He was then appointed commanding officer of the Basic School at Marine Corps Base Quantico, Virginia and was responsible for the initial training of all newly commissioned marine officers until September 1966, when he was promoted to the rank of brigadier general. Wheeler then assumed duties as assistant division commander within 2nd Marine Division under Major General Ormond R. Simpson. He spent following year with calm service at Camp Lejeune, North Carolina before assumed command of the division in November 1967. For his new assignment, Wheeler received his second star of major general in August 1968 and commanded the division until May 1969 and received his fourth Legion of Merit for that service.

Wheeler then began his second tour of duty in Vietnam as Deputy Commander of XXIV Corps under Lieutenant General Richard G. Stilwell and Lieutenant General Melvin Zais. He remained in that capacity just until December 1969, when he relieved his old superior, Ormond R. Simpson as commanding general of 1st Marine Division.

The 1st Marine Division was stationed in Quảng Nam Province and was to provide security for the city of Da Nang and assist Vietnamese forces "as requested" in support of pacification, while continuing surveillance, reconnaissance, and psychological warfare within its TAOR.

On April 18, Wheeler, members of his staff, and Colonel Edward A. Wilcox (1st Marines) were on an inspection of a search and destroy operation, while their helicopter crashed on approach to a jungle landing zone 15 miles (24 km) southwest of Da Nang. Wheeler suffered a broken leg and was ordered to the hospital in Da Nang. He relinquished command to Major General Charles F. Widdecke on April 27, 1970, and was ordered to the States for treatment at Bethesda Naval Hospital. Wheeler received the Navy Distinguished Service Medal for his second tour in Vietnam and also several decorations by the Government of South Vietnam.

Wheeler was appointed assistant chief of staff for personnel at Headquarters Marine Corps. He retired from the Marine Corps after 31 years of active service on September 1, 1972, and received his fifth Legion of Merit at the retirement ceremony.

== Retirement ==
Upon his retirement from the military, Wheeler settled in California with his wife Ghierstien. He was appointed Deputy Secretary of health, education and welfare for California State by then-Governor Ronald Reagan and served in this capacity for next two years. His wife Ghierstien died in August 1976 and Wheeler moved to Dallas, Texas, where he later married his second wife Betsy in 1977.

When Ronald Reagan was elected 40th President of the United States, he appointed Wheeler to the American Battle Monuments Commission. Within this capacity, Wheeler took part in several inspection trips of American military cemeteries and monuments in Europe.

Wheeler died of a heart attack on October 14, 1985, at Baylor University Medical Center. He is buried at Arlington National Cemetery, Virginia.

== Decorations ==
Here is the ribbon bar of Major General Edwin B. Wheeler:

| 1st Row | Navy Distinguished Service Medal | Silver Star | Legion of Merit with Combat "V" and four 5/16" Gold Stars | Navy Presidential Unit Citation with two stars |
| 2nd Row | Navy Unit Commendation | American Defense Service Medal | American Campaign Medal | Asiatic-Pacific Campaign Medal with three 3/16 inch service stars |
| 3rd Row | World War II Victory Medal | China Service Medal | National Defense Service Medal with one star | Korean Service Medal with three 3/16 inch service stars |
| 4th Row | Vietnam Service Medal with three 3/16 inch bronze service stars | Vietnam National Order of Vietnam, Knight | Vietnam Army Distinguished Service Order, 1st Class | Vietnam Gallantry Cross with Palm |
| 5th Row | Vietnam Gallantry Cross Unit Citation | Republic of Korea Presidential Unit Citation | United Nations Korea Medal | Vietnam Campaign Medal |

Military offices
| Preceded by Ormond R. Simpson | Commanding General of the 1st Marine Division; December 15, 1969 - April 26, 1970 | Succeeded by Charles F. Widdecke |
| Preceded by Ormond R. Simpson | Commanding General of the 2nd Marine Division; November 22, 1967 - May 18, 1969 | Succeeded by Michael P. Ryan |

== See also ==
- Marine Raiders
- Battle of Tulagi
- 1st Marine Division
- List of 1st Marine Division Commanders
- List of 2nd Marine Division Commanders
