= Thăng Bình district =

Coordinates: 15.667°N 108.383°E

Thăng Bình district Huyện Thăng Bình
- District
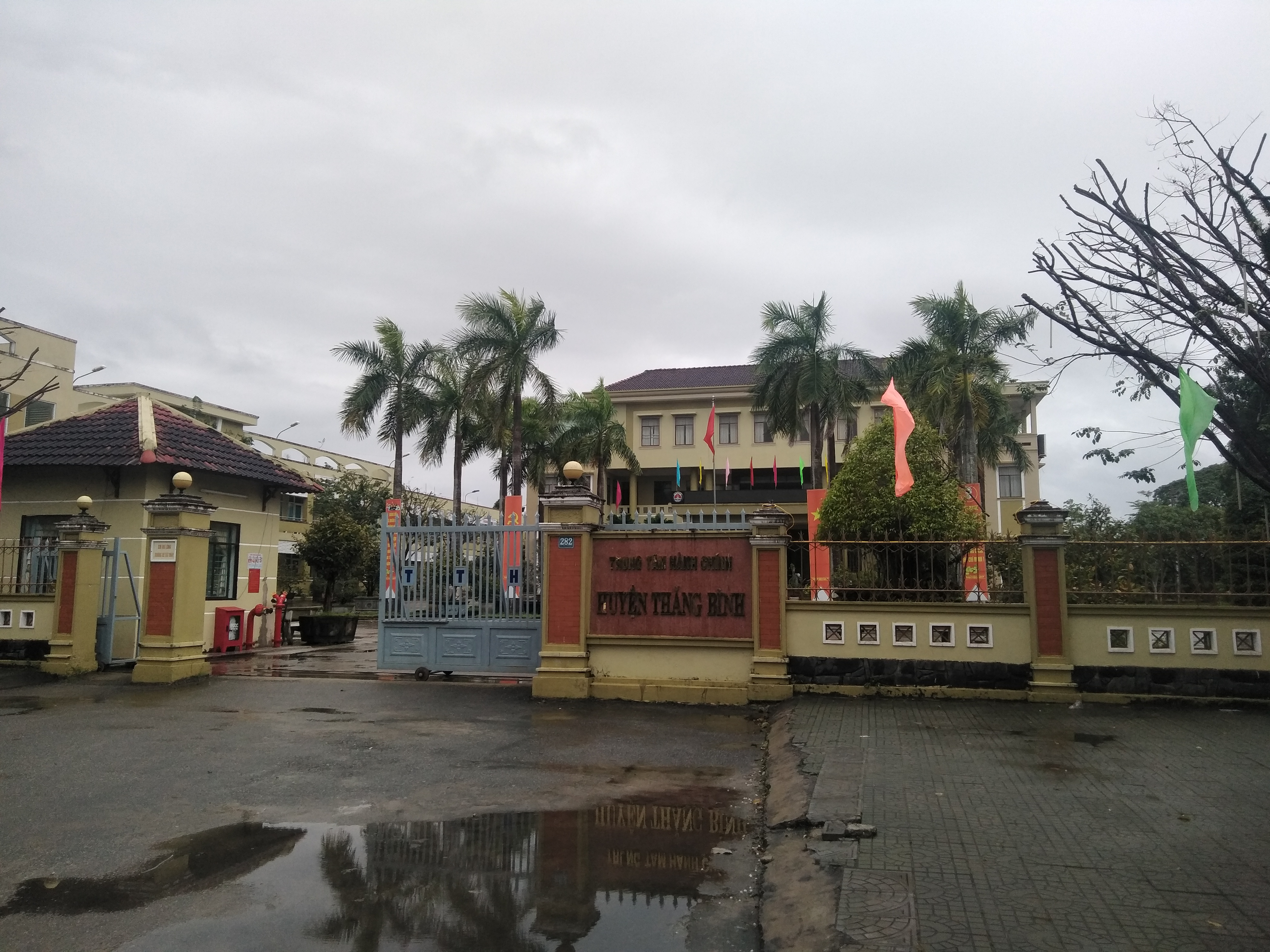
- Thăng Bình administrative divisions

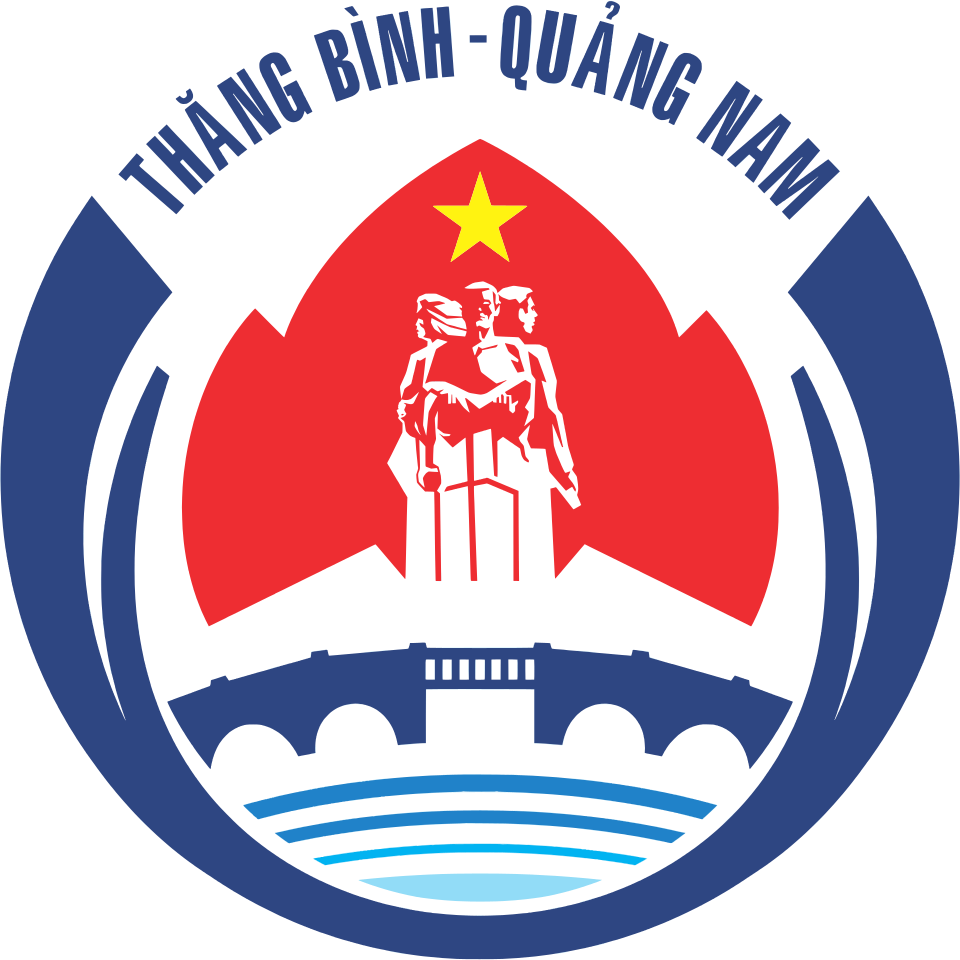
- Seal
- Interactive map of Thăng Bình district
- Country: Vietnam
- Region: South Central Coast
- Province: Quảng Nam province
- Capital: Hà Lam

Area
  - Total: 149 sq mi (385 km^{2})

Population (2003)
  - Total: 192,300
- Time zone: UTC+7 (Indochina Time)

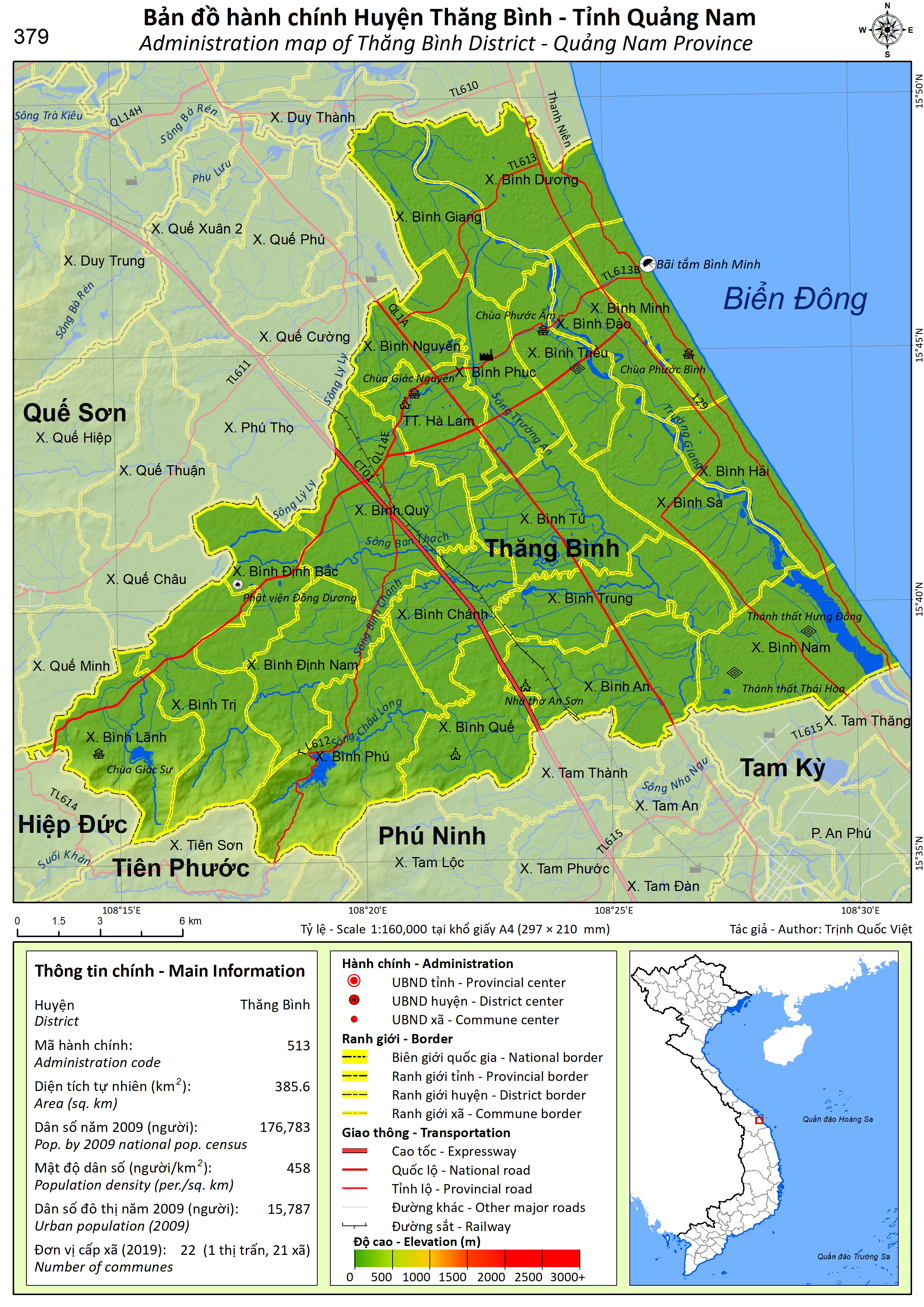
Administration map of Thăng Bình district

Thăng Bình is a former rural district (huyện) of Quảng Nam province in the South Central Coast region of Vietnam. As of 2003 the district had a population of 186,964. The district covers an area of 385 km^{2} (149 sq mi). The district capital lies at Hà Lam.
