= John P. Monahan =

United States Marine Corps general (1932–2023)

- Born: October 15, 1932
- Died: July 20, 2023 (aged 90); Lexington, Virginia, U.S.
- Burial place: Arlington National Cemetery
- Military career
- Allegiance: United States
- Branch: United States Marine Corps
- Service years: 1955–1990
- Rank: Major general
- Nickname: Phil
- Commands: Marine Corps Base Camp Pendleton; I Marine Expeditionary Force
- Awards: Defense Distinguished Service Medal

John Philip Monahan (October 15, 1932 – July 20, 2023) was a major general in the United States Marine Corps who served as commanding general of I Marine Expeditionary Force.

== Biography ==
Monahan was born on 15 October 1932. In 1955, he graduated from the United States Naval Academy with a degree in electrical engineering. While at the Naval Academy, Monahan captained the 1954 Navy Midshipmen football team to victory in the 1955 Sugar Bowl.

Monahan was commissioned into the Marine Corps as a Second Lieutenant and eventually retired in 1990 as Commander of I Marine Expeditionary Force and Commander of Marine Corps Base Camp Pendleton.

After retiring from the Marine Corps in 1990, Monahan served as Director of Football Operations at the University of Virginia and subsequently at Boston College.
