= Marine Corps Institute =

Educational institution of the US Marine Corps

The Marine Corps Institute, commonly referred to as MCI, developed and maintained a curriculum of Marine Corps education. Subjects included infantry strategy/tactics, leadership skills, MOS qualifications, personal finance, and mathematics. Completion of MCI courses was generally required for promotion to the next Marine enlisted rank.

== History ==
Founded in part by then-Col. John A. Lejeune, since February 1920, the Marine Corps Institute facilitated the training and education of individual Marines. MCI ensured access to products and provided opportunities to improve performance, to enhance Professional Military Education, and to provide promotion opportunity, together with sponsors of Marine Corps education and training programs.

As a tenant company of the Marine Barracks, Washington, D.C., MCI also coordinated and executed the Hosting and Parade Escort plan for the Evening and Sunset Parades. It provided ceremonial Officers and NCOs for the Parade Staffs and other assigned ceremonies in order to promote the Marine Corps heritage and to enhance the Marine Corps image to the general public.

MCI company also maintained individual MOS and Battle Skills proficiency both in garrison and field environments to prepare the individual Marine for combat.

The Marine Corps Institute was located at the historic Washington Navy Yard in Washington, D.C., S.E.

On 1 September 2015, the Marine Corps Institute Distance Learning mission transitioned to the College of Distance Education and Training (CDET) at Marine Corps University (MCU), Marine Base Quantico (VA). Marine Corps Institute was deactivated at Marine Barracks Washington, DC on 1 October 2015.

== Accreditation ==
The Marine Corps Institute was accredited by the Distance Education Accrediting Commission (formerly the Distance Education and Training Council) since 1977.
