= List of 3rd Marine Division commanders =

3rd Marine Division Insignia

The 3rd Marine Division is an infantry division of the United States Marine Corps based at Camp Courtney, Marine Corps Base Camp Smedley D. Butler and Okinawa, Japan. It is one of three active duty divisions in the Marine Corps and together with the 1st Marine Aircraft Wing (1stMAW) and the 3rd Marine Logistics Group (3rd MLG) forms the III Marine Expeditionary Force (III MEF). The division was first formed during World War II and saw four years of continuous combat in the Vietnam War.

During its history, four commanding generals became the Commandant of the Marine Corps (David M. Shoup, Robert E. Cushman Jr., Louis H. Wilson Jr. and Robert Neller) and another four commanding generals became Assistant Commandant of the Marine Corps (Charles D. Barrett, Allen H. Turnage, Lewis W. Walt and Raymond G. Davis).

Three commanding generals were recipients of Medal of Honor, the United States of America's highest and most prestigious personal military decoration that may be awarded to recognize U.S. military service members who distinguished themselves by acts of valor. They were: David M. Shoup, Louis H. Wilson Jr. and Raymond G. Davis.

== Commanding generals ==
=== World War II ===
#	Picture	Name	Rank	Start	End	Notability	Ref
1		Charles D. Barrett	Major general	September 16, 1942	September 14, 1943	Veteran of World War I and Banana Wars; oversaw the formation of the division; Served as Assistant Commandant of the Marine Corps and later assumed command of I Marine Amphibious Corps; Navy Distinguished Service Medal	
2		Allen H. Turnage	Major general	September 15, 1943	September 14, 1944	Veteran of World War I, Banana Wars, Yangtze Patrol; led the division during Bougainville Campaign and recapture of Guam. Later served as Assistant Commandant of the Marine Corps or Commanding general of Fleet Marine Force, Pacific; Navy Cross, Navy Distinguished Service Medal and Legion of Merit.	
3		Alfred H. Noble (Acting)	Brigadier general	September 15, 1944	October 13, 1944	Veteran of World War I, Banana Wars, Bougainville Campaign and recapture of Guam; While serving as Assistant Division Commander he assumed temporary command; later commanded Department of the Pacific or Fleet Marine Force, Atlantic; Navy Cross, Distinguished Service Cross, two awards of Silver Star, two awards of Legion of Merit with Combat "V".	
4		Graves B. Erskine	Major general	October 14, 1944	October 20, 1945	Veteran of World War I, Banana Wars, battles of Kwajalein, Saipan, Tinian or Guam; led the division during Battle of Iwo Jima; later commanded 1st Marine Division, Camp Pendleton or Fleet Marine Force, Pacific; Navy Distinguished Service Medal, Silver Star, two awards of Legion of Merit with Combat "V" or two awards of Purple Heart.	
5		William E. Riley	Brigadier general	October 21, 1945	December 28, 1945	Veteran of World War I, Banana Wars, campaigns of Bougainville and the Philippines; led the division back to the United States for deactivation; later served as a chief of staff of the United Nations Truce Supervision Organization in Palestine; Navy Distinguished Service Medal, two awards of Silver Star, two awards of Legion of Merit with Combat "V" or two awards of Purple Heart.	

=== Reactivation ===
#	Picture	Name	Rank	Start	End	Notability	Ref
6		Merrill B. Twining (Acting)	Brigadier general	January 7, 1952	February 14, 1952	Veteran of Yangtze Patrol and Guadalcanal Campaign; oversaw the reactivation of the division; later commanded 1st Marine Division during Korean War and served as commandant of Marine Corps Schools, Quantico; two awards of Legion of Merit with Combat "V" and Navy Commendation Medal.	
7		Robert H. Pepper	Major general	February 15, 1952	May 9, 1954	Veteran of World War I, World War II and Korean War; also commanded 1st Marine Division, Marine Corps Recruit Depot Parris Island or Fleet Marine Force, Pacific; Legion of Merit with Combat "V" and Navy Commendation Medal	
8		James P. Riseley	Major general	May 10, 1954	June 30, 1955	Veteran of Guadalcanal Campaign, battles of Tarawa, Saipan and Tinian; later commanded Camp Pendleton or served as director of personnel at Headquarters Marine Corps; Legion of Merit with Combat "V" and Bronze Star Medal.	
9		Thomas A. Wornham	Major general	July 1, 1955	July 26, 1956	Veteran of Yangtze Patrol, Battle of Iwo Jima and Korean War; later commanded Marine Corps Recruit Depot San Diego or Fleet Marine Force, Pacific; Navy Cross, Navy Distinguished Service Medal, Legion of Merit with Combat "V" and Bronze Star Medal.	
10		Victor H. Krulak (Acting)	Brigadier general	July 27, 1956	September 6, 1956	Veteran of Yangtze Patrol, Raid on Choiseul, Battle of Okinawa and Korean War; Former Paramarine; later commanded Marine Corps Recruit Depot San Diego or Fleet Marine Force, Pacific; Navy Cross, Navy Distinguished Service Medal, three awards of Legion of Merit with Combat "V", Bronze Star Medal and Purple Heart. Father of late Commandant of the Marine Corps, Charles C. Krulak.	
11		Alan Shapley	Major general	September 7, 1956	July 1, 1957	Veteran of Bougainville Campaign, recapture of Guam, Battle of Okinawa and Korean War; Former Marine Raider; later commanded Camp Pendleton, Marine Corps Reserve or Fleet Marine Force, Atlantic; Navy Cross, Silver Star, two awards of Legion of Merit with Combat "V" and Bronze Star Medal.	
12		Francis M. McAlister	Major general	July 2, 1957	March 28, 1958	Veteran of Banana Wars, Yangtze Patrol, Bougainville Campaign, recapture of Guam, Battle of Peleliu, Battle of Okinawa and Korean War; later commanded Department of the Pacific; Silver Star, three awards of Legion of Merit with Combat "V", Bronze Star Medal with Combat "V" and Purple Heart.	
13		David M. Shoup	Major general	March 29, 1958	April 1, 1959	Veteran of Yangtze Patrol, battles of Tarawa, Saipan and Tinian; later served as the 22nd Commandant of the Marine Corps; Medal of Honor, Navy Distinguished Service Medal, two awards of Legion of Merit with Combat "V", two awards of Purple Heart and British Distinguished Service Order.	
14		Rathvon M. Tompkins (Acting)	Colonel	April 2, 1959	May 8, 1959	Veteran of Guadalcanal Campaign, battles of Tarawa, Saipan, Korean War and Vietnam War; later commanded 3rd Marine Division during the Battle of Khe Sanh in Vietnam War; also commanded Camp Lejeune or Marine Corps Recruit Depot Parris Island; Navy Cross, two awards of Navy Distinguished Service Medal, Silver Star, two awards of Legion of Merit with Combat "V", two awards of Bronze Star Medal with Combat "V" and Purple Heart.	
15		Lewis C. Hudson (Acting)	Brigadier general	May 9, 1959	June 19, 1959	Veteran of the battles of Kwajalein, Saipan, Tinian and Iwo Jima; later commanded Troop Training Unit, Atlantic Fleet; Navy Cross, Legion of Merit with Combat "V" and Purple Heart.	
16		Robert B. Luckey	Major general	June 20, 1959	August 31, 1960	Veteran of Banana Wars, Yangtze Patrol, Guadalcanal Campaign or Battle of Okinawa; later commanded Fleet Marine Force, Atlantic; Legion of Merit and two awards of Bronze Star Medal with Combat "V".	
17		Donald M. Weller	Major general	September 1, 1960	September 1, 1961	Veteran of Bougainville Campaign, recapture of Guam and Battle of Iwo Jima; Pioneer of Naval gunfire support; later served as deputy commander, Fleet Marine Force Pacific; Legion of Merit with Combat "V" and two awards of Bronze Star Medal with Combat "V".	
18		Robert E. Cushman Jr.	Major general	September 2, 1961	June 3, 1962	Veteran of Bougainville Campaign, recapture of Guam, Battle of Iwo Jima or Vietnam War; Served as the 25th Commandant of the Marine Corps; also served as Deputy Director of the Central Intelligence Agency or Commanded III Marine Expeditionary Force in Vietnam; Navy Cross, four awards of Navy Distinguished Service Medal, Legion of Merit with Combat "V" and Bronze Star Medal with Combat "V".	
19		Henry W. Buse Jr.	Major general	June 4, 1962	May 9, 1963	Veteran of Guadalcanal Campaign, Battle of Cape Gloucester and Korean War; later served as commanding general, Fleet Marine Force, Pacific or Chief of Staff, Headquarters Marine Corps; two awards of Navy Distinguished Service Medal, Silver Star, two awards of Legion of Merit with Combat "V" and two awards of Bronze Star Medal with Combat "V".	
20		James M. Masters Sr.	Major general	May 10, 1963	June 16, 1964	Veteran of Yangtze Patrol, New Britain campaign, Battle of Cape Gloucester and Okinawa; later served as commanding general, United States Marine Corps Training and Education Command; Navy Cross, Navy Distinguished Service Medal, Legion of Merit with Combat "V" and Bronze Star Medal.	
21		William R. Collins	Major general	June 17, 1964	June 4, 1965	Veteran of Battle of Iwo Jima and Vietnam War; Led 3rd Marine Division to Vietnam; later served as commanding general, III Marine Expeditionary Force or Assistant Chief of Staff for Operations at Headquarters Marine Corps; Silver Star, two awards of Legion of Merit with Combat "V" and Joint Service Commendation Medal.	
22		Lewis W. Walt	Major general	June 5, 1965	March 17, 1966	Veteran of Yangtze Patrol, Guadalcanal Campaign, Battle of Cape Gloucester, Korean War and Vietnam War; later served as commanding general, III Marine Expeditionary Force or Assistant Commandant of the Marine Corps; two awards of Navy Cross, two awards of Navy Distinguished Service Medal, Silver Star, two awards of Legion of Merit with Combat "V", Bronze Star Medal with Combat "V" and two awards of Purple Heart.	
23		Wood B. Kyle	Major general	March 18, 1966	March 17, 1967	Veteran of Yangtze Patrol, Guadalcanal Campaign, battles of Tarawa, Saipan, Tinian and Vietnam War; later served as commanding general, Camp Pendleton or 4th Marine Division; Navy Distinguished Service Medal, Two awards of Silver Star, Legion of Merit and Purple Heart.	
24		Bruno Hochmuth	Major general	March 19, 1967	November 14, 1967	Veteran of Yangtze Patrol, battles of Saipan, Tinian, Okinawa and Vietnam War; Died in helicopter crash while in command of the division; previously served as commanding general, Marine Corps Recruit Depot San Diego; two awards of Navy Distinguished Service Medal, Legion of Merit and two awards Purple Heart.	
25		Louis Metzger (Acting)	Brigadier general	November 15, 1967	November 27, 1967	Veteran of battles of Saipan, Tinian, Okinawa, Korean and Vietnam Wars; Assumed temporary command following the death of Hochmuth; later served as commanding general, III Marine Expeditionary Force; two awards of Navy Distinguished Service Medal, two awards of Legion of Merit with Combat "V" and two awards Bronze Star Medal with Combat "V".	
26		Rathvon M. Tompkins	Major general	November 28, 1967	May 20, 1968	Veteran of Guadalcanal Campaign, battles of Tarawa, Saipan, Korean War and Vietnam War; later commanded 3rd Marine Division during the Battle of Khe Sanh in Vietnam War; also commanded Camp Lejeune or Marine Corps Recruit Depot Parris Island; Navy Cross, two awards of Navy Distinguished Service Medal, Silver Star, two awards of Legion of Merit with Combat "V", two awards of Bronze Star Medal with Combat "V" and Purple Heart.	
27		Raymond G. Davis	Major general	May 21, 1968	April 14, 1969	Veteran of Guadalcanal Campaign, battles of Cape Gloucester, Peleliu, Korean War and Vietnam War; later served as commanding general, Marine Corps Combat Development Command or Assistant Commandant of the Marine Corps; Medal of Honor, Navy Cross, two awards of Navy Distinguished Service Medal, two awards of Silver Star, two awards of Legion of Merit with Combat "V", Bronze Star Medal with Combat "V" and Purple Heart.	
28		William K. Jones	Major general	April 15, 1969	March 30, 1970	Veteran of Guadalcanal Campaign, battles of Cape Gloucester, Peleliu, Korean War and Vietnam War; later served as commanding general, Fleet Marine Force, Pacific; Navy Cross, three awards of Navy Distinguished Service Medal, Silver Star, Legion of Merit, Bronze Star Medal and Purple Heart.	
29		Louis H. Wilson Jr.	Major general	March 31, 1970	March 22, 1971	Veteran of Bougainville Campaign, recapture of Guam and Vietnam War; later served as 25th Commandant of the Marine Corps; Medal of Honor, two awards of Defense Distinguished Service Medal, three awards of Legion of Merit with Combat "V" and three awards of Purple Heart.	
30		Louis Metzger	Major general	March 23, 1971	January 7, 1972	Veteran of battles of Saipan, Tinian, Okinawa, Korean and Vietnam Wars; previously served as temporary division commander following the death of Hochmuth; later served as commanding general, III Marine Expeditionary Force; two awards of Navy Distinguished Service Medal, two awards of Legion of Merit with Combat "V" and two awards Bronze Star Medal with Combat "V".	
31		Joseph C. Fegan Jr.	Major general	January 8, 1972	January 7, 1973	Veteran of battles of Saipan, Tinian, Korean and Vietnam Wars; later served as commanding general, Marine Corps Recruit Depot San Diego or Marine Corps Combat Development Command; Navy Distinguished Service Medal, two awards of Silver Star, three awards of Legion of Merit and three awards Purple Heart; A son of Marine Major general Joseph C. Fegan.	
32		Michael P. Ryan	Major general	January 8, 1973	August 31, 1973	Veteran of Guadalcanal Campaign, battles of Tarawa, Saipan, Tinian, Korean and Vietnam Wars; later commanded III Marine Expeditionary Force or Marine Corps Reserve; Navy Cross, Legion of Merit with Combat "V" or British Distinguished Service Cross.	
33		Fred E. Haynes Jr.	Major general	September 1, 1973	August 22, 1974	Veteran of Battle of Iwo Jima or Korean and Vietnam Wars; also served as commanding general of Camp Lejeune or 2nd Marine Division; Four awards of Legion of Merit with Combat "V" or Bronze Star Medal with Combat "V".	
34		Kenneth J. Houghton	Major general	August 23, 1974	August 13, 1975	Veteran of battles of Tarawa, Saipan, Tinian or Korean and Vietnam Wars; also commanded 1st Marine Division, III Marine Expeditionary Force or Marine Corps Recruit Depot San Diego; Navy Cross, Navy Distinguished Service Medal, two awards of Silver Star, three awards of Legion of Merit with Combat "V", two awards of Bronze Star Medal with Combat "V" or three awards Purple Heart.	
35		Herbert L. Wilkerson	Major general	August 14, 1975	July 19, 1976	Veteran of Guadalcanal Campaign, Korean or Vietnam Wars; previously served as commanding general, Camp Lejeune; two awards of Legion of Merit with Combat "V" and Navy Commendation Medal with Combat "V".	
36		George W. Smith	Major general	July 20, 1976	July 16, 1977	Veteran of Battle of Okinawa, Korean or Vietnam Wars; previously served as commanding general, Camp Lejeune; Silver Star and Two awards of Legion of Merit with Combat "V". Father of Marine Lieutenant general George W. Smith Jr.	
37		Adolph G. Schwenk	Major general	July 17, 1977	July 10, 1978	Veteran of World War II, Korean War and Vietnam War; later commanded Fleet Marine Force, Atlantic; Navy Distinguished Service Medal and two awards of Legion of Merit with Combat "V"	
38		Calhoun J. Killeen	Major general	July 11, 1978	July 11, 1979	Veteran of Korean War and Vietnam War; later served as deputy commander, Fleet Marine Force, Pacific; two awards of Legion of Merit with Combat "V" and Bronze Star Medal with Combat "V".	
39		Kenneth L. Robinson	Major general	July 12, 1979	July 24, 1980	Veteran of Korean War and Vietnam War; later commanded Camp Pendleton; Legion of Merit with Combat "V"	
40		Stephen G. Olmstead	Major general	July 25, 1980	June 21, 1982	Veteran of Korean War and Vietnam War; later commanded III Marine Expeditionary Force; Defense Distinguished Service Medal, Navy Distinguished Service Medal, Legion of Merit and Bronze Star Medal.	
41		Robert E. Haebel	Major general	June 22, 1982	July 6, 1984	Veteran of Korean War and Vietnam War; also commanded Marine Corps Recruit Depot Parris Island or Camp Pendleton; Navy Distinguished Service Medal, Legion of Merit with Combat "V", Bronze Star Medal with Combat "V" and two awards of Purple Heart.	
42		Edwin J. Godfrey	Major general	July 7, 1984	September 30, 1987	Veteran of Vietnam War; later commanded Fleet Marine Force, Pacific; Navy Distinguished Service Medal, Defense Superior Service Medal and Legion of Merit with Combat "V".	
43		Norman H. Smith	Major general	October 1, 1987	September 30, 1989	Veteran of Vietnam War; later served as deputy chief of staff for manpower and reserve affairs at Headquarters Marine Corps; Navy Distinguished Service Medal, Defense Superior Service Medal, two awards of Legion of Merit and two awards of Bronze Star Medal with Combat "V".	
44		Henry C. Stackpole III	Major general	September 30, 1989	September 1, 1991	Veteran of Vietnam War; later served as commanding general, Fleet Marine Force, Pacific or Deputy Chief of Staff for Plans, Policies and Operations at Headquarters Marine Corps; Silver Star, two awards of Defense Superior Service Medal, Legion of Merit, two awards of Purple Heart and two awards of Navy Commendation Medal with Combat "V".	
45		Michael J. Byron (general)	Major general	September 2, 1991	September 1, 1993	Veteran of Vietnam War; later served as director for plans and policy (J-5) for the United States Atlantic Command and U.S. Military Representative to the NATO Military Committee; two awards of Defense Distinguished Service Medal, Navy Distinguished Service Medal, Silver Star, Legion of Merit, two awards of Bronze Star Medal with Combat "V", Purple Heart and Navy Commedantion Medal with Combat "V".	
46		Ray L. Smith	Major general	September 2, 1991	December 2, 1993	Veteran of Vietnam War; later served as commanding general, Camp Lejeune; Navy Cross, Defense Distinguished Service Medal, Navy Distinguished Service Medal, two awards of Silver Star, two awards of Legion of Merit, Bronze Star Medal with Combat "V", three awards of Purple Heart and two awards of Navy Commedantion Medal with Combat "V".	
47		Donald R. Gardner	Major general	December 3, 1993	June 30, 1994	Veteran of Vietnam War; later served as commanding general, Camp Lejeune or President of Marine Corps University; Navy Distinguished Service Medal, Silver Star, two awards of Legion of Merit with Combat "V", Purple Heart and Navy Commedantion Medal with Combat "V".	
48		David F. Bice	Major general	July 1, 1994	September 1, 1995	Veteran of Vietnam War; later served as Inspector General of the Marine Corps or Commanding general, Camp Pendleton; Navy Distinguished Service Medal, Defense Superior Service Medal, Legion of Merit and Navy Commedantion Medal with Combat "V".	
49		Raymond P. Ayres	Major general	September 2, 1995	June 30, 1997	Veteran of Vietnam War; later served as deputy chief of staff, plans, policies and operations; Defense Distinguished Service Medal, Defense Superior Service Medal, two awards of Legion of Merit and Bronze Star Medal with Combat "V".	
50		Dennis M. McCarthy	Major general	July 1, 1997	October 1, 1997	Veteran of Vietnam War; first Reserve general officer to command an active duty Marine Division; later commanded Marine Corps Reserve and also served as Assistant Secretary of Defense for Reserve Affairs; Navy Distinguished Service Medal, Defense Superior Service Medal, Meritorious Service Medal and Navy Commendation Medal with Combat "V".	
51		Jerry D. Humble	Major general	October 2, 1997	December 1, 1999	Veteran of Vietnam War and Operation Desert storm; later served as commanding general, Marine Corps Recruiting Command; Defense Distinguished Service Medal, Navy Distinguished Service Medal and three awards of Legion of Merit with Combat "V".	
52		Gordon C. Nash	Major general	December 2, 1999	May 23, 2002	Veteran of Vietnam War and Operation Desert storm; later served as commanding general, Marine Corps Recruiting Command; Defense Distinguished Service Medal, Navy Distinguished Service Medal and three awards of Legion of Merit with Combat "V".	
53		Joseph F. Weber	Major general	May 24, 2002	July 7, 2004	Veteran of Iraq War; Later served as commanding general, United States Marine Corps Forces Command or III Marine Expeditionary Force; Defense Distinguished Service Medal, Legion of Merit, Bronze Star Medal and three awards of Defense Meritorious Service Medal.	
54		Christian B. Cowdrey	Brigadier general	July 8, 2004	January 11, 2006	Veteran of Operations Desert Shield, Desert Storm or Restore Hope; Later served as commanding general, III Marine Expeditionary Force; Defense Superior Service Medal, two awards of Legion of Merit, Meritorious Service Medal and Navy Commedantion Medal.	
55		Mastin M. Robeson	Major general	January 12, 2006	April 26, 2007	Veteran of Gulf War or Operation Restore Hope; Later served as commanding general, Marine Corps Forces Special Operations Command or III Marine Expeditionary Force; Defense Distinguished Service Medal, Defense Superior Service Medal, Legion of Merit or two awards of Meritorious Service Medal.	
56		Joseph V. Medina (Acting)	Brigadier general	April 27, 2007	June 11, 2007	Veteran of Kosovo War or Operation Iraqi Freedom; previously served as commanding general, Marine Corps Base Camp Smedley D. Butler; Defense Distinguished Service Medal, Defense Superior Service Medal, two awards of Legion of Merit, Defense Meritorious Service Medal or three awards of Meritorious Service Medal.	
57		Robert Neller	Major general	June 12, 2007	August 20, 2008	Veteran of Invasion of Panama, Iraq War or Operation Restore Hope; The 37th Commandant of the Marine Corps; Defense Distinguished Service Medal, Legion of Merit, Bronze Star Medal and Defense Meritorious Service Medal.	
58		James B. Laster	Major general	August 21, 2008	April 10, 2009	Veteran of War in Afghanistan; Later served as director, Marine Corps Staff at Headquarters Marine Corps; two awards of Defense Superior Service Medal, Legion of Merit and three awards of Meritorious Service Medal.	
59		Mark A. Brilakis	Major general	April 11, 2009	June 30, 2011	Veteran of Gulf War; Later served as commander, United States Marine Corps Forces Command; Defense Superior Service Medal, two awards of Legion of Merit and three awards of Meritorious Service Medal.	
60		Frederick M. Padilla	Major general	July 1, 2011	July 12, 2013	Veteran of Iraq War; Later served as president, National Defense University; Three awards of Legion of Merit with Combat "V", Defense Meritorious Service Medal and Meritorious Service Medal.	
61		H. Stacy Clardy	Major general	July 13, 2013	June 26, 2015	Veteran of Wars in Iraq and Afghanistan; Later served as director of operations for the Plans, Policies, and Operations Department at Headquarters Marine Corps; Defense Superior Service Medal, three awards of Legion of Merit with Combat "V", Bronze Star Medal with Combat "V" and three awards of Meritorious Service Medal.	
62		Richard L. Simcock	Major general	June 27, 2015	January 20, 2017	Veteran of Iraq War and Afghanistan; Later served as deputy commander, United States Marine Corps Forces, Pacific; Defense Superior Service Medal, two awards of Legion of Merit with Combat "V" and four awards of Meritorious Service Medal.	
63		Craig Q. Timberlake	Major general	January 21, 2017	July 8, 2018	Veteran of Iraq War and Afghanistan; Later served as deputy commanding general, Regional Command North, International Security Assistance Force, Afghanistan; Defense Superior Service Medal, two awards of Legion of Merit, Defense Meritorious Service Medal and two awards of Meritorious Service Medal.	
64		William M. Jurney	Major general	July 9, 2018	August 11, 2020	Veteran of Gulf War, Iraq War and War in Afghanistan; previously served as commanding general, Marine Corps Recruit Depot San Diego; Three awards of Defense Superior Service Medal, Legion of Merit, two awards of Bronze Star Medal with Combat "V" and three awards of Meritorious Service Medal.	
65		James W. Bierman Jr.	Major general	August 12, 2020	November 8, 2021	Veteran of Iraq War and War in Afghanistan; previously served as commanding general, Marine Corps Recruiting Command; Defense Superior Service Medal, two awards of Legion of Merit, three awards of Bronze Star Medal with Combat "V" and three awards of Meritorious Service Medal.	
66		Jay M. Bargeron	Major general	November 8, 2021	June 30, 2023	Veteran of Iraq War and War in Afghanistan; previously served as president, Marine Corps University; two awards of Defense Superior Service Medal, two awards of Legion of Merit, three awards of Bronze Star Medal and two awards of Meritorious Service Medal.	
67		Christian F. Wortman	Major general	June 30, 2023	July 30, 2025	Veteran of Iraq War and War in Afghanistan; previously served as senior military assistant to the Deputy Secretary of Defense; two awards of Defense Superior Service Medal, two awards of Legion of Merit and the Bronze Star Medal with Valor	
68		Kyle B. Ellison	Major general	July 30, 2025	Incumbent	Veteran of Iraq War and War in Afghanistan	

== See also ==
- List of United States Marine Corps divisions
- List of 1st Marine Aircraft Wing Commanders
- List of 1st Marine Division Commanders
- List of 2nd Marine Division Commanders
- List of Historically Important U.S. Marines
- List of United States Marine Corps aircraft wings
- List of active United States Marine Corps aircraft squadrons
