= Stephen G. Olmstead =

American military officer (1929–2022)

Stephen Goodwin Olmstead
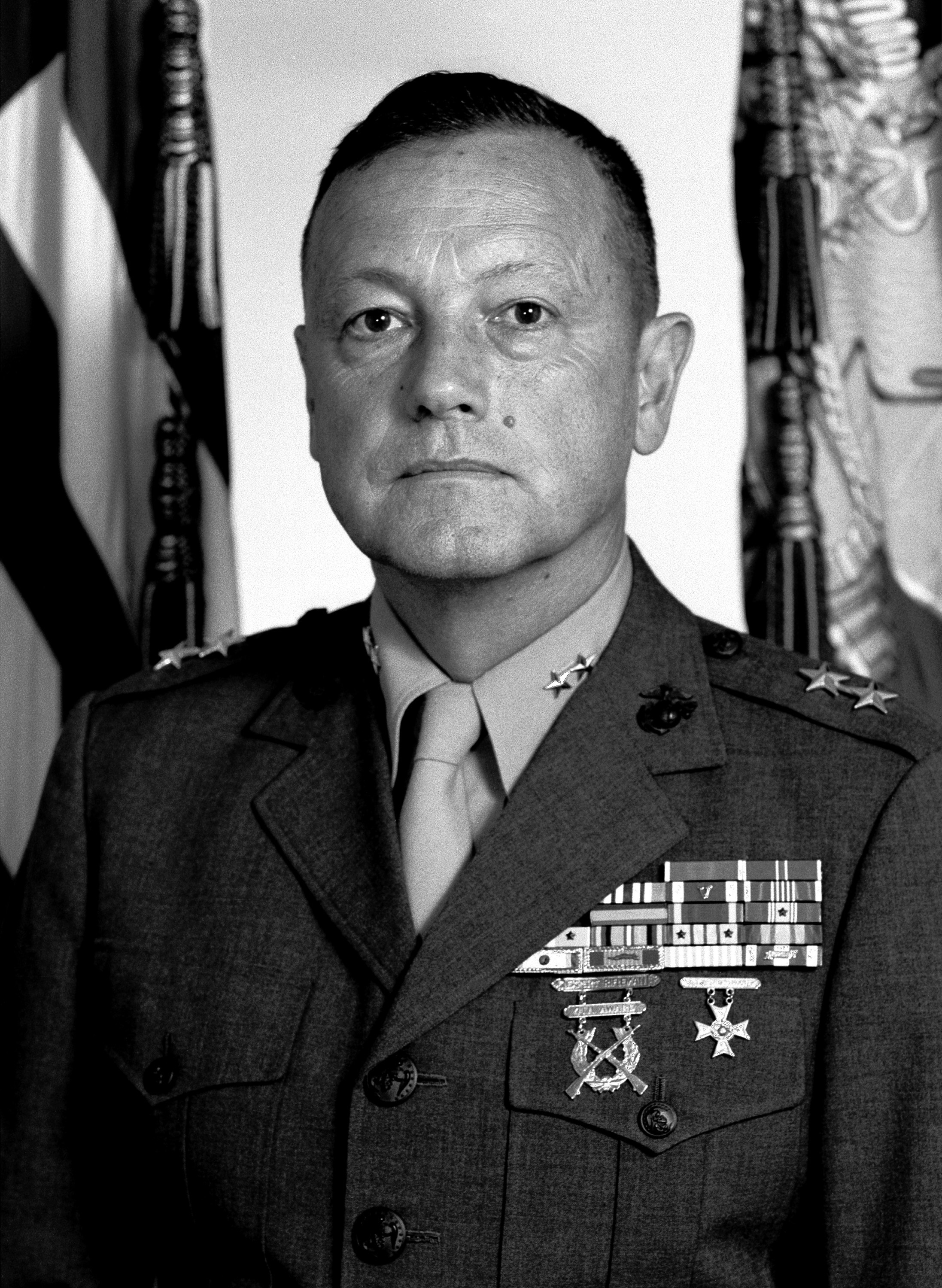
- Olmstead in 1982
- Born: 10 November 1929; Albany, New York, U.S.
- Died: 20 July 2022 (aged 92); Annandale, Virginia, U.S.
- Burial place: Quantico National Cemetery
- Military career
- Allegiance: United States of America
- Branch: United States Marine Corps
- Service years: 1948–1989
- Rank: Lieutenant General
- Nickname: "Steve"
- Service number: 0-54006
- Commands: MCRD Parris Island; 3rd Marine Division; Camp Pendleton; 9th Marine Regiment
- Conflicts: Korean War: Battle of Inchon; Battle of Chosin Reservoir; Dominican Civil War; Vietnam War
- Awards: Defense Distinguished Service Medal; Distinguished Service Medal; Legion of Merit; Bronze Star Medal; Commendation Medal (3)

Stephen Goodwin Olmstead (10 November 1929 – 20 July 2022) was a highly decorated officer in the United States Marine Corps with a rank of Lieutenant General. His last assignment was Deputy Assistant Secretary of Defense for Drug Policy and Enforcement and the Director of the Department of Defense Task Force on Drug Enforcement.

== Early career ==
Stephen G. Olmstead was born on 10 November 1929, in Albany, New York, to Leo Henry Olmstead and Charlotte Boody. He graduated from Bethlehem Central High School in summer 1947 and completed one year at the Champlain College in Plattsburgh, New York. Olmstead subsequently enlisted in the Marine Corps in August 1948 and was ordered to the boot camp at Parris Island, South Carolina.

Following a United States entry into the Korean War in June 1950, he was assigned to the newly activated "G" Company, 3rd Battalion, 1st Marine Regiment at Camp Pendleton, California and sailed for Korea at the end of August that year. Olmstead was promoted to the rank of Private First Class and participated in the Inchon Landing in September 1950 and then in the Chosin Reservoir Campaign in November–December 1950, where he served as Squad leader.

He was subsequently sent back to the United States and selected for the Basic School at Quantico, Virginia. Olmstead completed the school in June 1951 and was commissioned second lieutenant. He then remained at Marine Corps Base Quantico and served consecutively as Platoon leader and Company Executive Officer within the School's Demonstration Troops until early 1953.

While at Quantico, Olmstead was promoted to first lieutenant in October 1952 and completed the correspondence course at the Naval Justice School at Newport, Rhode Island. He joined the Marine Detachment aboard the light cruiser USS Northampton in January 1953 and served as Detachment Executive officer during the extensive tests of new equipment of the ship.

In March 1954, Olmstead was promoted to captain and ordered to Manchester, New Hampshire, for duty as inspector-instructor with 18th Rifle Company, Marine Corps Reserve. He was responsible for the training of Marine reservists there until October 1957, when he was sent to Camp Lejeune, North Carolina, for duty as assistant operations officer, 2nd Battalion, 8th Marines, 2nd Marine Division.

During January 1958, Olmstead was reassigned as a company commander, 2nd Reconnaissance Battalion, 2nd Marine Division under Major General Joseph C. Burger and served in this capacity until July 1959, when he was sent to the Army Infantry School at Fort Benning, Georgia for an instruction. He completed Advanced Infantry Course there in May 1960 and assumed duty as assistant logistics officer (S-4), Camp Butler, Okinawa.

He remained in that capacity until July 1961, when he was sent back to the United States for duty as an instructor at the Army Intelligence School at Fort Holabird, Maryland. While in this capacity, he was promoted to Major in September 1961. While in this assignment, he earned Bachelor of Science degree from Military Science at the University of Maryland, College Park.

Olmstead returned to Camp Lejeune, North Carolina, in July 1964 and joined 6th Marine Regiment, 2nd Marine Division as Regimental Operations officer. While in this capacity, he took part in the amphibious landing during the period of unrests in Dominican Republic in April 1965. For his service in this capacity, he was decorated with Navy Commendation Medal with Combat "V".

== Vietnam War ==
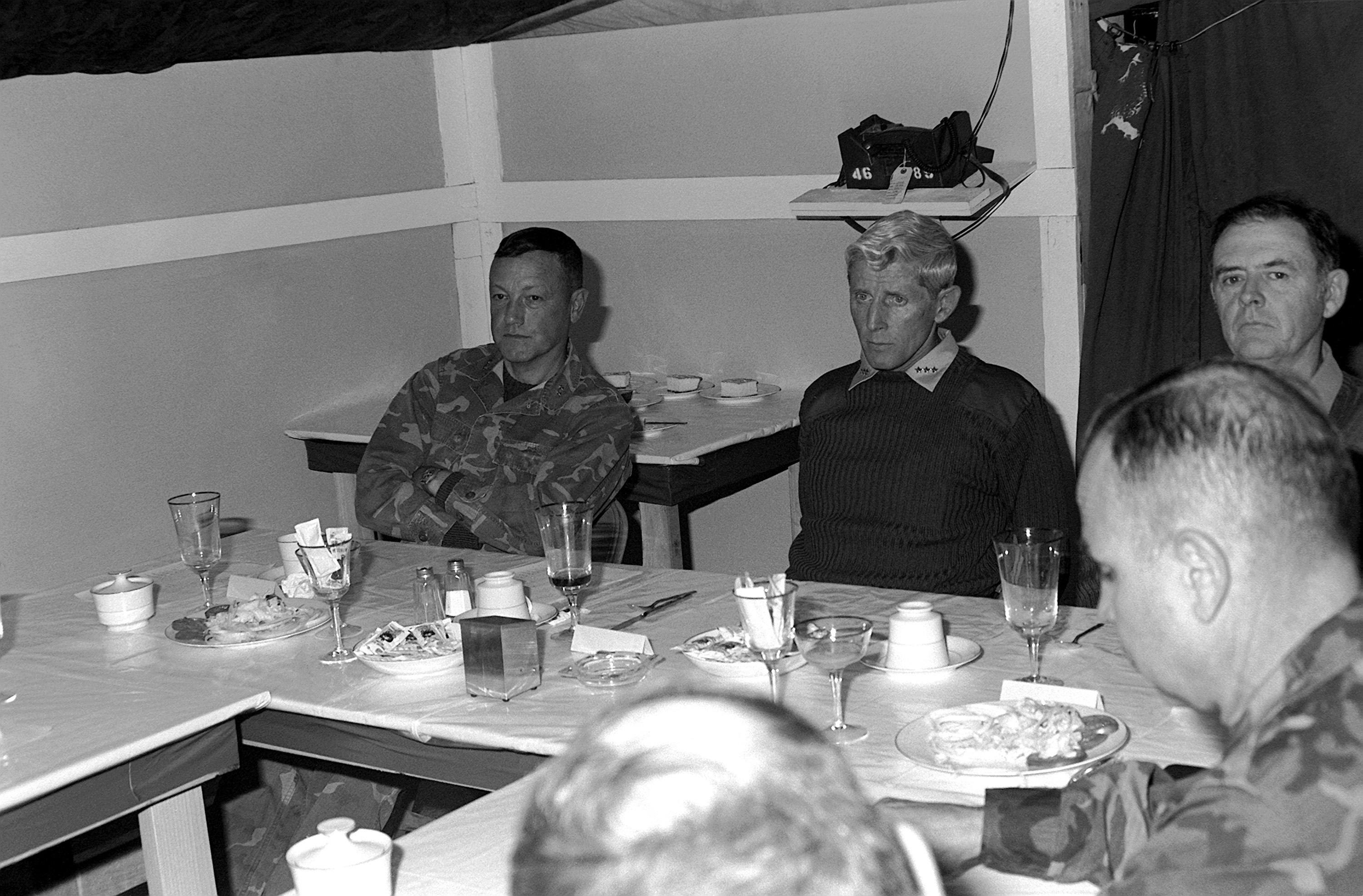
From left to right, Olmstead, III Marine Amphibious Force; VADM M. Staser Holcomb, commander, 7th Fleet; and RADM George B. Schick, commander, Amphibious Group One, discuss the proceedings of exercise Team Spirit '82 at a meeting with other joint military officers.

Following a period of service back at Camp Lejeune, Olmstead received orders for deployment to South Vietnam in May 1966. He was ordered to Saigon, where he was attached to the headquarters, Military Assistance Command, Vietnam under General William C. Westmoreland. Olmstead served as the command briefer and was promoted to lieutenant colonel in October 1966. He remained in that capacity until May 1967, when he was ordered back to the United States. For his service in South Vietnam, Olmstead was decorated with Bronze Star Medal and Army Commendation Medal.

He was then attached to the Joint Strategic Target Planning Staff at Offutt Air Force Base, Nebraska and served as operations officer until June 1969. While in this assignment, Olmstead participated in the evaluation of target intelligence in support of the Single Integrated Operational Plan, the United States' general plan for nuclear war. He cooperated with foreign officers of allied nations and members of other services attached to the Staff. His duties included the coordination of intelligence having a direct impact on the National Strategic Target List and Joint Chiefs of Staff Single Integrated Operation Plan. Olmstead distinguished himself in this capacity and received Joint Service Commendation Medal.

Olmstead was subsequently ordered to the Naval War College at Newport, Rhode Island, where he completed the Senior Course in June 1970 and also graduated with Master of Science degree from the correspondence course in the international affairs at the George Washington University. He was then assigned to the Headquarters Marine Corps in Washington, D.C. and appointed Branch Head in the Operations Division (G-3) under Major general Clifford B. Drake. Olmstead was promoted to colonel in September 1971.

In July 1973, Olmstead was ordered to Okinawa, Japan and assumed command of 9th Marine Regiment, 3rd Marine Division under Major general Fred E. Haynes Jr. While in this capacity, he conducted several inspection trips to Phnom Penh, Cambodia during the ongoing Civil War and held additional duty as Ground Security Force commander. Olmstead also participated in the planning of Operation Eagle Pull, military evacuation by air of Phnom Penh, which occurred after his departure for the United States.

== Later career ==
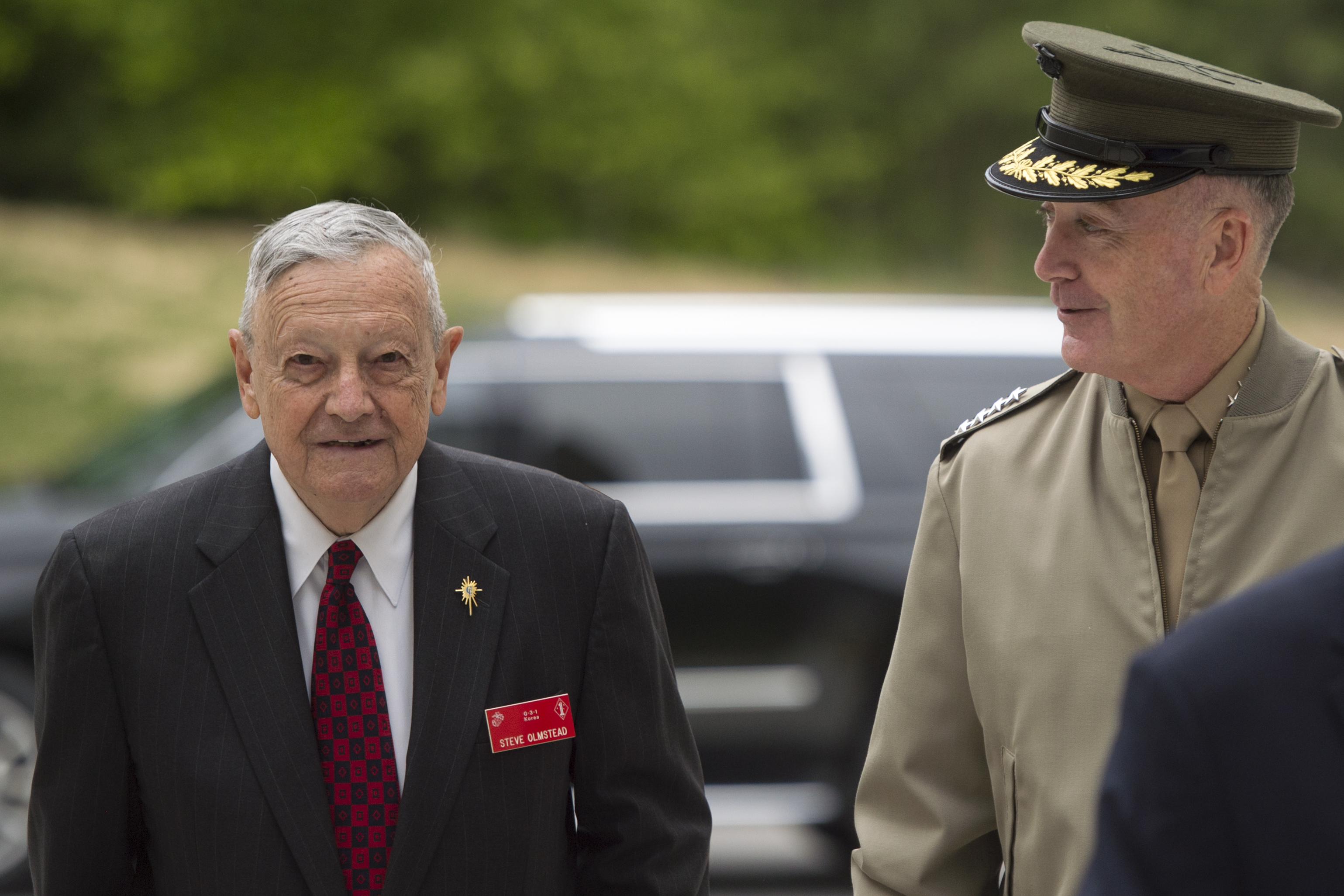
Olmstead and Gen. Joseph Dunford, then-Chairman of the Joint Chiefs of Staff, who served as the guest speaker for Chosin Few Memorial Dedication Ceremony at the National Museum of the Marine Corps on 4 May 2017.

Olmstead was ordered to Gaeta, Italy, in May 1974 and joined the staff of Commander, United States Sixth Fleet under Vice Admiral Frederick C. Turner. He served as the Fleet Marine Officer until his promotion to brigadier general on 1 April 1976, when he was ordered back to the United States for new assignment. Olmstead was then sent to the Marine Corps Development and Education Command, Quantico and served as Deputy for Development and Director of Development Center, Quantico under Lieutenant General Joseph C. Fegan Jr.

He was responsible for the development and testing of new tactics, equipment and techniques and in January 1977, he was given additional duty as Deputy Chief of Staff for Research, Development and Studies at the Headquarters Marine Corps. Upon his promotion to major general on 23 May 1978, Olmstead was appointed Commanding general, Camp Pendleton, California, and served in this capacity until July 1980, when he was sent to Okinawa for duty as Commanding general, III Marine Amphibious Force and Commanding General, 3rd Marine Division. His command was responsible for the defense of Far East area and Olmstead received Legion of Merit and Korean Order of National Security Merit, 3rd Class.

Olmstead was transferred to the Headquarters Marine Corps at the end of June 1982 and assumed duty as Deputy Chief of Staff for Reserve Affairs. He served in this capacity until July 1984, when he assumed duty as Commanding General, Marine Corps Recruit Depot Parris Island, South Carolina. While in this capacity, he held additional duty as Commanding general, Eastern Recruiting Region and served in this assignment until 1 July 1986, when he retired from active duty. Olmstead was decorated with Navy Distinguished Service Medal during his retirement ceremony.

His retirement did not last long and he was recalled to active duty in October 1986, when President Ronald Reagan appointed him with Senate confirmation to serve as the Deputy Assistant Secretary of Defense for Drug Policy and Enforcement and the Director of the Department of Defense Task Force on Drug Enforcement. It was the part of Reagan's War on drugs and Olmstead was responsible for the coordination of inter-branch anti-drug activities.

Olmstead's office loaned equipment to other law enforcement agencies like Coast Guard, Border Patrol, Customs from rifles, binoculars, ground sensor equipment, radar to airborne radar aircraft etc. His office also provided specialized training and technical assistance within the Department of Defense and provided aerial surveillance in the Caribbean, along the Mexican Border, the Gulf of Mexico, and the offshore waters of California and Florida. While in this assignment, Olmstead was promoted to lieutenant general on 25 March 1987.

He served in this assignment until June 1989, when he retired from active duty for second time, completing 41 years of service. Olmstead received Defense Distinguished Service Medal for service as the Deputy Assistant Secretary of Defense for Drug Policy and Enforcement and the Director of the Department of Defense Task Force on Drug Enforcement.

== Retirement ==
Following his retirement from the Marine Corps, Olmstead served as Chairman of the Marine Corps Scholarship Foundation for six years. He was past President of Partners Against Drug Abuse, Inc. and served on the board of directors of the International Narcotic Enforcement Officers Association. Olmstead was National Chairman of the Marine Corps League Exposition Committee, was past president of the United States Marine Youth Foundation and past president of The Chosin Few, a Korea veterans organization.

Olmstead died on 20 July 2022, following a brief hospital stay. He was survived by his wife of seventy years, the former Vera L. Mead and their three children: Barbara J., Elizabeth A. and Stephen G., also a Marine officer.

== Medals and decorations ==
Here is the ribbon bar of Lieutenant General Olmstead:

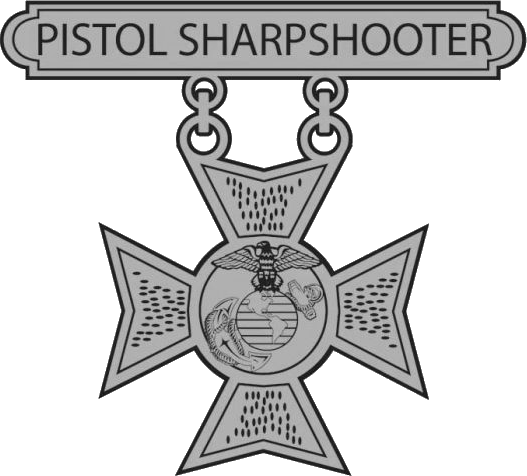

1st row	Defense Distinguished Service Medal			
2nd row	Navy Distinguished Service Medal	Legion of Merit	Bronze Star Medal	Joint Service Commendation Medal
3rd row	Navy Commendation Medal with Combat "V"	Army Commendation Medal	Combat Action Ribbon	Navy Presidential Unit Citation
4th row	Navy Unit Commendation	Navy Meritorious Unit Commendation	National Defense Service Medal with one star	Korean Service Medal with two 3/16 inch service stars
5th row	Armed Forces Expeditionary Medal	Vietnam Service Medal with two 3/16 inch service stars	Navy Sea Service Ribbon	Order of National Security Merit, 3rd Class (Republic of Korea)
6th row	Korean Presidential Unit Citation	Vietnam Gallantry Cross Unit Citation	United Nations Korea Medal	Vietnam Campaign Medal

== See also ==
- List of 3rd Marine Division Commanders

Military offices
Preceded by James J. McMonagle	Commanding General, Marine Corps Recruit Depot Parris Island; 6 July 1984 – 1 July 1986	Succeeded by Harold G. Glasgow
Preceded by Kenneth L. Robinson	Commanding General, 3rd Marine Division; 25 July 1980 – 21 June 1982	Succeeded by Robert E. Haebel
Preceded by Carl W. Hoffman	Commanding General, Camp Pendleton; 30 June 1978 – July 1980	Succeeded by Hugh W. Hardy
