= Jason Bohm =

U.S. Marine Corps general

Jason Q. Bohm
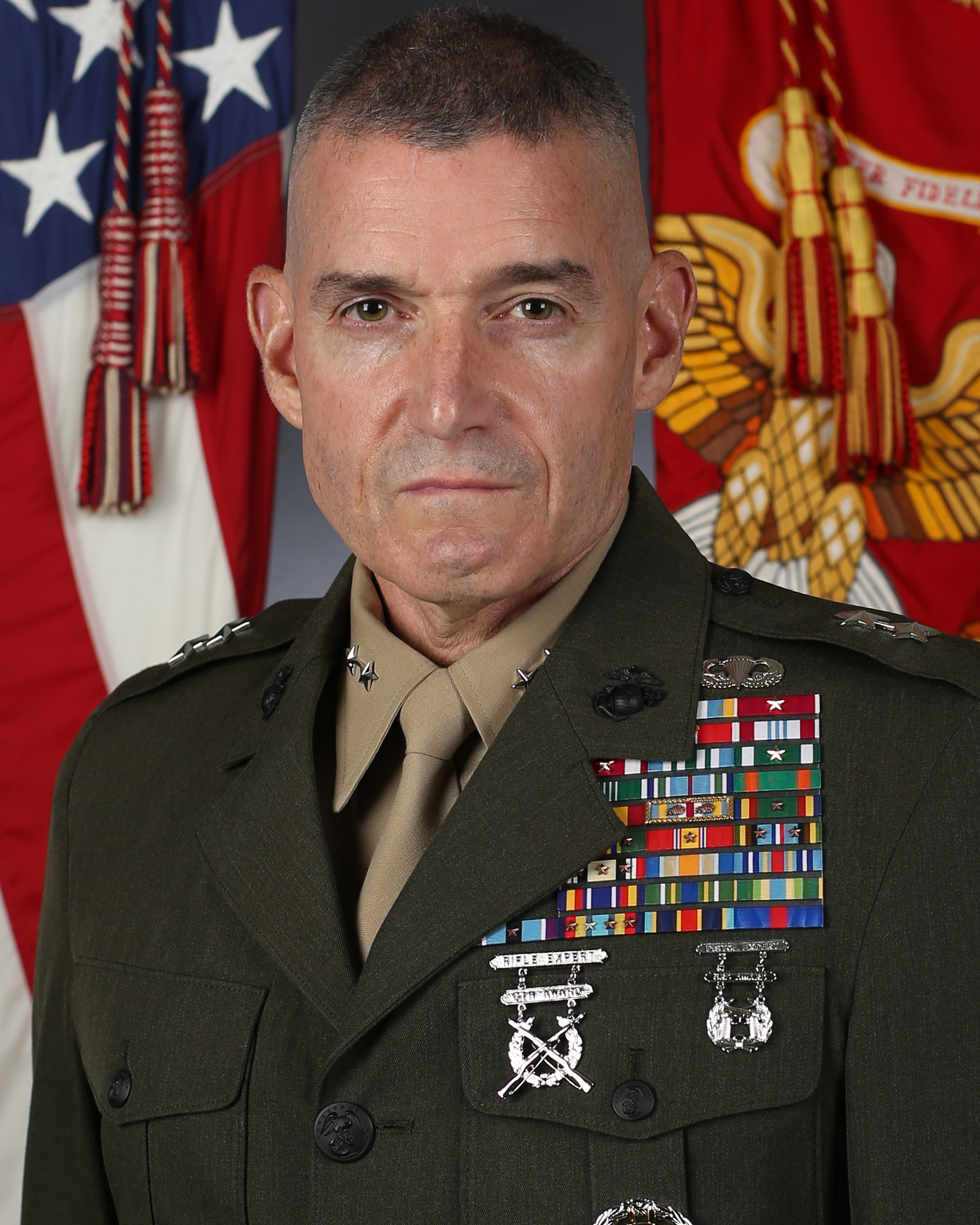
- Military career
- Allegiance: United States
- Branch: United States Marine Corps
- Service years: 1990–present
- Rank: Major General
- Commands: Inspector General of the United States Marine Corps; Marine Corps Recruiting Command; Marine Corps Training Command

Jason Q. Bohm is a retired United States Marine Corps major general who last served as the Inspector General of the Marine Corps from 2022 to 2024. He served as the Commanding General of the Marine Corps Recruiting Command from 2020 to 2022. Previously, he served as the Chief of Staff of the Naval Striking and Support Forces NATO from 2018 to 2020.

He is the author of the book From the Cold War to ISIL: One Marine’s Journey, which was published in 2019. On June 24, 2024 Bohm announced that he was taking over as the dean of the Helms School of Government at Liberty University.

Military offices
Preceded by Austin Renforth	Commanding General of the Marine Corps Training Command; 2016–2018	Succeeded by Calvert L. Worth Jr.
Preceded by Karsten Heckl	Chief of Staff of the Naval Striking and Support Forces NATO; 2018–2020	Succeeded by Marcus Annibale
Preceded by James W. Bierman Jr.	Commanding General of the Marine Corps Recruiting Command; 2020–2022	Succeeded by William J. Bowers
Preceded by Carl E. Shelton Jr. Acting	Inspector General of the Marine Corps; 2022–2024	Succeeded by Carl J. Adams Jr. Acting
