= H. Stacy Clardy =

United States Marine Corps general

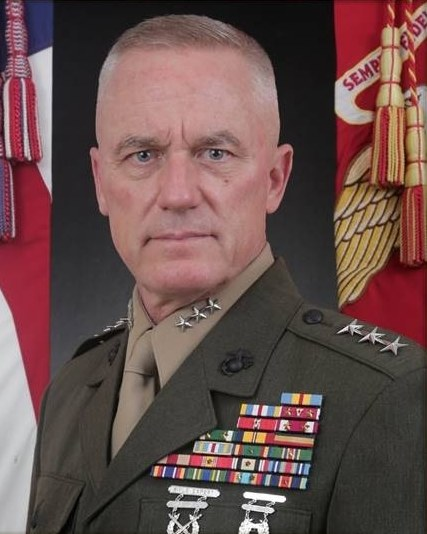
- Born: Herman Stacy Clardy III; 1960 (age 65–66)
- Military career
- Allegiance: United States
- Branch: United States Marine Corps
- Service years: 1983–2021
- Rank: Lieutenant General
- Commands: III Marine Expeditionary Force; 3rd Marine Division; Marine Corps Air Ground Combat Center Twentynine Palms; Regimental Combat Team 2; 3rd Light Armored Reconnaissance Battalion
- Conflicts: Iraq War
- Awards: Defense Distinguished Service Medal; Defense Superior Service Medal; Legion of Merit (3); Bronze Star Medal

Herman Stacy Clardy III (born 1960) is a retired United States Marine Corps lieutenant general who last served as the commanding general of III Marine Expeditionary Force. He previously served as the military deputy for the Under Secretary of Defense for Personnel and Readiness, and before that as the J8 Deputy Director for Force Management, Application and Support on the Joint Staff. He was the 39th commander of the base in Twentynine Palms.

== Marine career ==
From Georgetown, South Carolina, Clardy was commissioned on May 13, 1983 after graduating from the University of South Carolina with a Bachelor of Science in Business Administration. He has a Master of Science in Management from Troy State University and a Master of Arts in National Security and Strategic Studies from the Naval War College.

Clardy's command positions include platoon commander with 3d Battalion, 4th Marine Regiment and company commander in 2d Light Armored Reconnaissance Battalion. He commanded the 3rd Light Armored Reconnaissance Battalion in Operations Enduring Freedom and Iraqi Freedom and 2nd Marine Regiment and Regimental Combat Team 2 during Operation Iraqi Freedom. As a general, he served as the Commanding General of Marine Air Ground Task Force Training Command, Marine Corps Air Ground Combat Center, and as the Commanding General, 3rd Marine Division.

Clardy served in multiple leadership and staff positions throughout his career. He was a tactics instructor at The Basic School and Infantry Officer Course, the Marine Officer Instructor at Tulane University, and the Community Relations Branch Head for the Division of Public Affairs, Headquarters Marine Corps. He served as the Operations Officer of 24th Marine Expeditionary Unit (Special Operations Capable) participating in Operation Joint Guardian and as the Community Policy, Planning and Liaison Officer for Marine Corps Bases, Japan. He was the Director for the Expeditionary Warfare School and the Director of Operations for the Plans, Policies, and Operations Department of Headquarters, United States Marine Corps.

In April 2019, Clardy was nominated to become the next commander of III Marine Expeditionary Force and Marine Forces Japan. With the confirmation of his successor, Clardy has retired from active duty.

== Awards and decorations ==

1st row	Defense Distinguished Service Medal	Navy Distinguished Service Medal	Defense Superior Service Medal		Legion of Merit with Combat V and two gold award stars
2nd row	Bronze Star Medal with Combat V	Meritorious Service Medal with two award stars		Navy and Marine Corps Commendation Medal with two award stars	Combat Action Ribbon
3rd row	Navy Presidential Unit Citation	Joint Meritorious Unit Award		Navy Unit Commendation with one bronze service star	Navy Meritorious Unit Commendation with silver service star
4th row	Marine Corps Expeditionary Medal	National Defense Service Medal with one service star		Iraq Campaign Medal with one service star	Global War on Terrorism Expeditionary Medal
5th row	Global War on Terrorism Service Medal	Korea Defense Service Medal		Navy Sea Service Deployment Ribbon with six service stars	Navy and Marine Corps Overseas Service Ribbon with four service stars
Badges	Rifle Expert Badge (Several Awards)			Pistol Expert Badge (Several Awards)	
Badge	Office of the Secretary of Defense Identification Badge				
Badge	Office of the Joint Chiefs of Staff Identification Badge				

Military offices
Preceded by Frederick M. Padilla	Commander of the 3rd Marine Division; 2013–2015	Succeeded by Richard L. Simcock
Preceded by Eric M. Smith	Commander of the III Marine Expeditionary Force; 2019–2021	Succeeded by James W. Bierman
