= James Bierman =

U.S. Marine Corps general

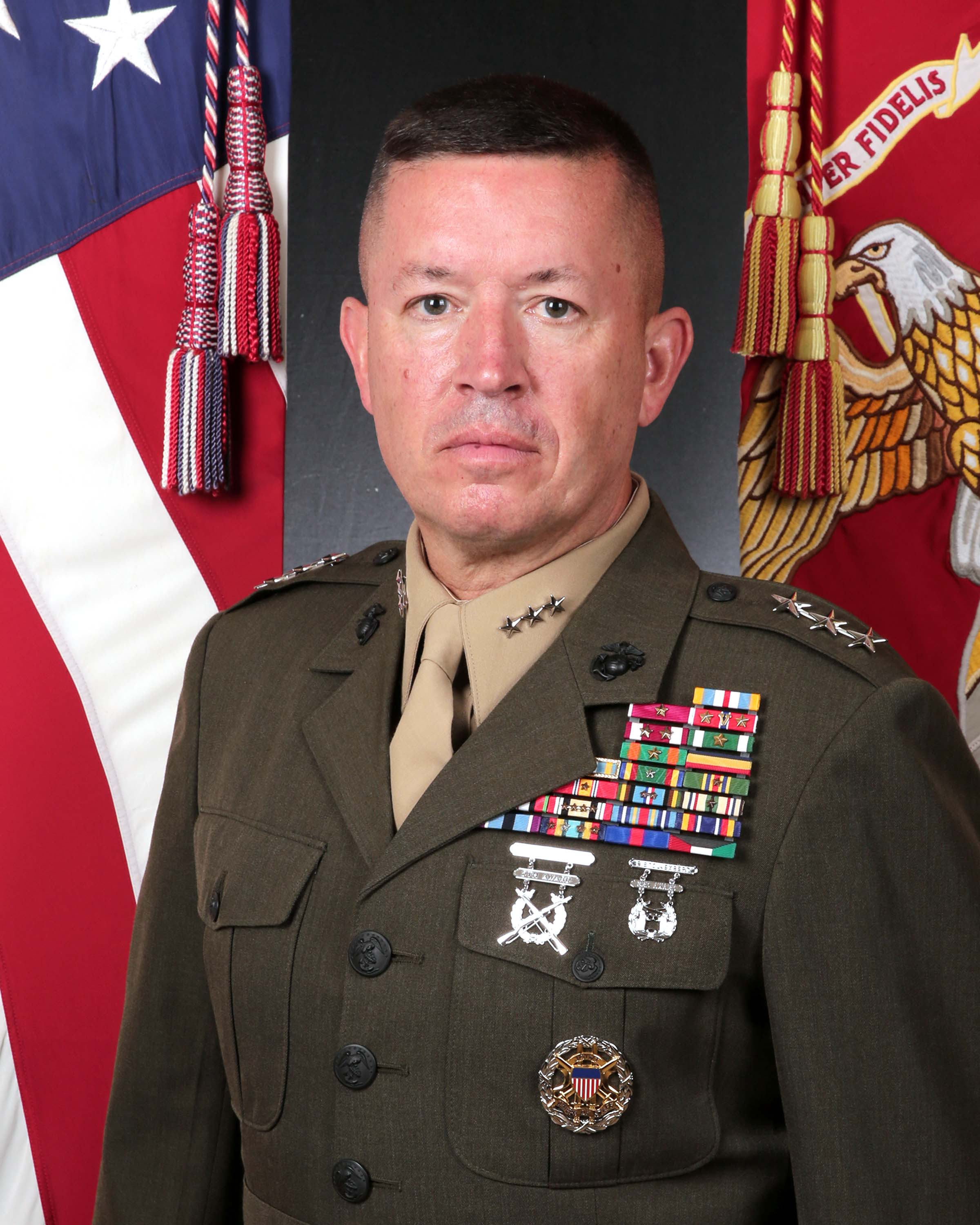
- Official portrait, 2021
- Born: Marine Corps Base Camp Lejeune, Jacksonville, North Carolina, U.S.
- Allegiance: United States
- Branch: United States Marine Corps
- Service years: 1987–2025
- Rank: Lieutenant General
- Commands: III Marine Expeditionary Force; 3rd Marine Division; Marine Corps Recruiting Command; Marine Corps Recruit Depot San Diego; Western Recruiting Region; 3rd Marine Regiment; 1st Battalion, 3rd Marines; Recruiting Station Richmond
- Conflicts: Gulf War; War in Afghanistan; Iraq War
- Awards: Defense Superior Service Medal; Legion of Merit (2); Bronze Star Medal (3)
- Education: Virginia Military Institute (1987)

James W. Bierman Jr. is a retired United States Marine Corps lieutenant general who last served as the deputy commandant for plans, policies and operations of the United States Marine Corps from 2024 to 2025. He served as the commanding general of III Marine Expeditionary Force and Marine Forces Japan from 2021 to 2024. He also served as commanding general of the 3rd Marine Division from 2020 to 2021, and as the commanding general of the Marine Corps Recruiting Command from 2018 to 2020.

In March 2023, Bierman was reassigned as deputy commandant for plans, policies and operations of the United States Marine Corps.

In February 2025, Bierman was named the 47th commandant of the Corps of Cadets at Texas A&M University. He assumed this role on 1 August 2025.

Military offices
Preceded by George W. Smith Jr.	Military Secretary to the Commandant of the Marine Corps; 2011–2013	Succeeded by Roger B. Turner Jr.
Preceded by Daniel Yoo	Commanding General of Marine Corps Recruit Depot San Diego; 2013–2016	Succeeded by William Jurney
Preceded by Gregg P. Olson	Deputy Director for Political-Military Affairs (Middle East) of the Joint Staff; 2016–2018	Succeeded by Scott Benedict
Preceded by Paul J. Kennedy	Commanding General of the Marine Corps Recruiting Command; 2018–2020	Succeeded by Jason Bohm
Preceded by William Jurney	Commanding General of the 3rd Marine Division; 2020–2021	Succeeded by Jay M. Bargeron
Preceded by H. Stacy Clardy III	Commanding General of the III Marine Expeditionary Force; 2021–2024	Succeeded by Roger B. Turner
Preceded by Roger B. Turner Jr. Acting	Deputy Commandant for Plans, Policies, and Operations of the United States Marine Corps; 2024–2025	Succeeded by Jay M. Bargeron
