= Bargeron =

Bargeron is an English surname. Notable people with the surname include:

- Dave Bargeron (1942–2025), American trombonist and tuba player
- Jay Bargeron (fl. 1984), United States Marine Corps major general
