= Jay Bargeron =

U.S. Marine Corps general

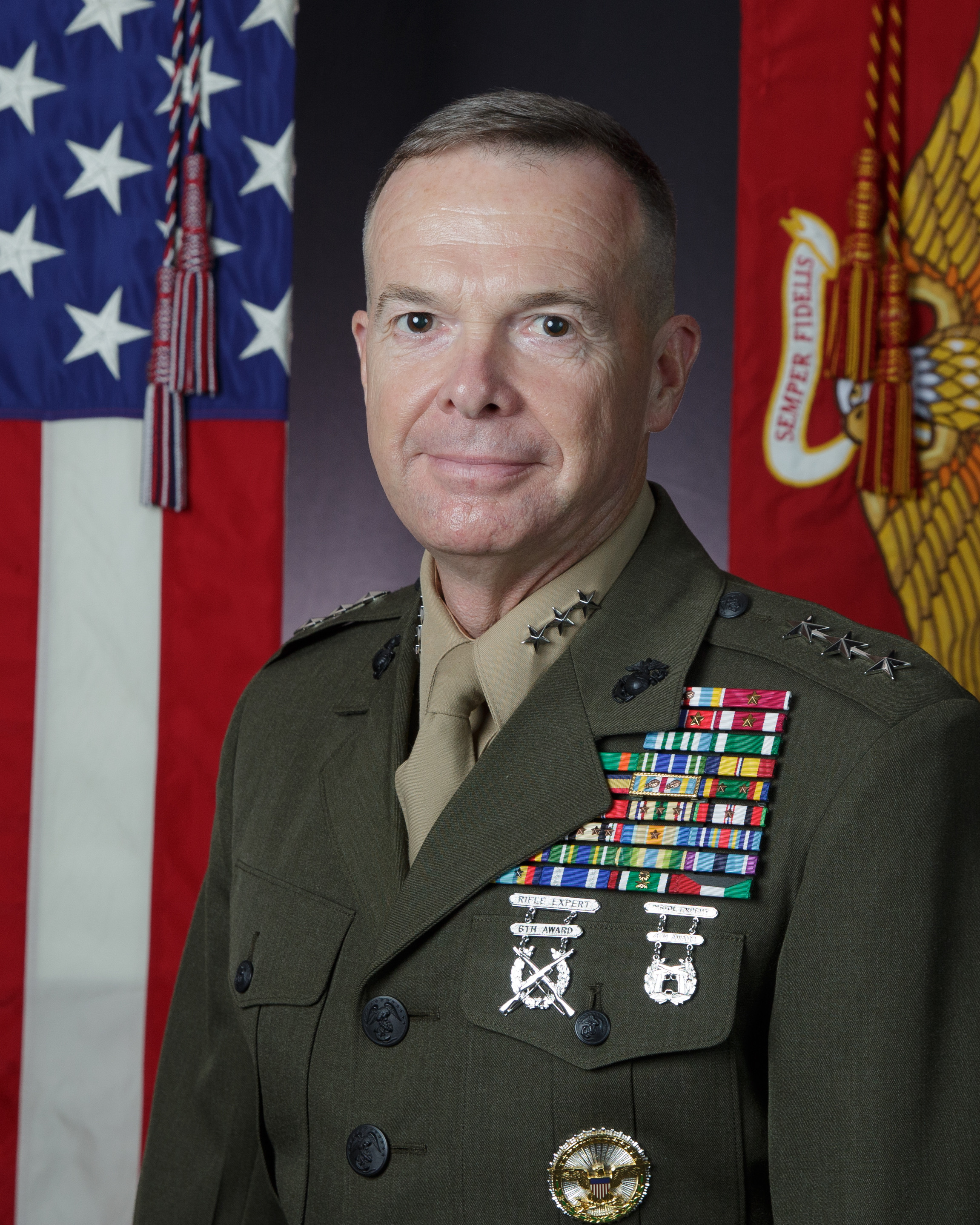
- Official portrait, 2025
- Military career
- Allegiance: United States
- Branch: United States Marine Corps
- Service years: 1984–present
- Rank: Lieutenant General
- Commands: 3rd Marine Division; Marine Corps University; 7th Marine Regiment

Jay M. Bargeron is a United States Marine Corps lieutenant general who has served as the deputy commandant for plans, policies and operations of the United States Marine Corps since 2025. He most recently served as the director of strategic planning and policy of the United States Indo-Pacific Command from 2023 to 2025. He served as the commanding general of the 3rd Marine Division from 2021 to 2023. He also served as the president of the Marine Corps University from 2019 to 2021, and as the deputy director of plans and operations of the United States European Command.

In June 2025, Bargeron was nominated for promotion to lieutenant general and assignment as deputy commandant for plans, policies and operations of the United States Marine Corps.

Military offices
Preceded by Austin Renforth	Commander of the 7th Marine Regiment; 2013–2015	Succeeded by William H. Vivian
Preceded by ???	Deputy Director of Plans and Operations of the United States European Command; 201?–2019	Succeeded by ???
Preceded by William J. Bowers	President of the Marine Corps University; 2019–2021	Succeeded by Walker M. Field
Preceded by James W. Bierman Jr.	Commanding General of the 3rd Marine Division; 2021–2023	Succeeded by Christian F. Wortman
Preceded by Christopher McPhillips	Director of Strategic Planning and Policy of the United States Indo-Pacific Command; 2023–2025	Succeeded by George B. Rowell IV
Preceded by James W. Bierman Jr.	Deputy Commandant for Plans, Policies, and Operations of the United States Marine Corps; 2025–present	Incumbent
