= Craig Q. Timberlake =

United States Marine Corps general

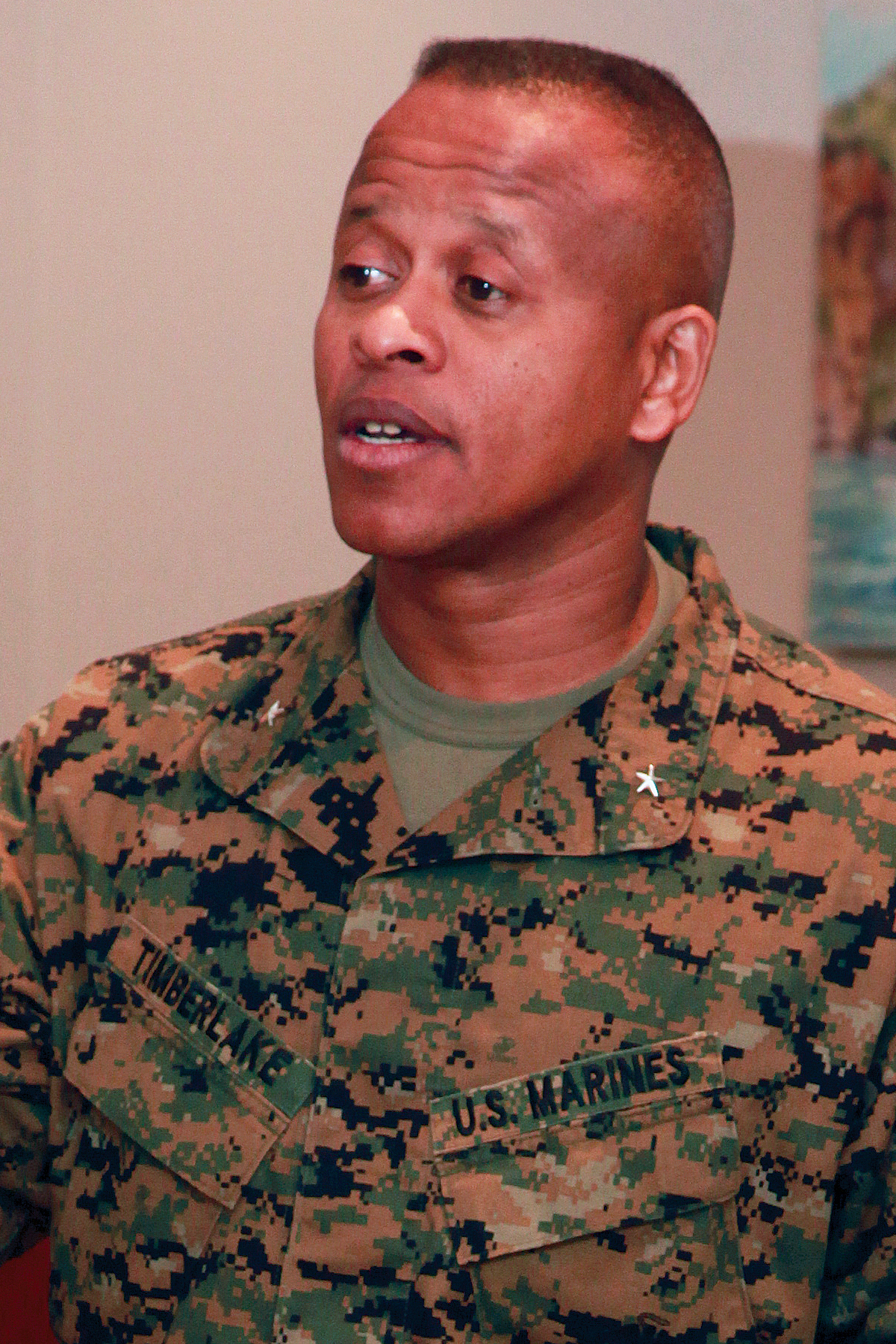
Craig Timberlake in 2013

Major General Craig Q. Timberlake is a United States Marine Corps officer. He is currently the Director of the Manpower Management Division.

== Career ==
Craig Timberlake joined the US Marine Corps in May 1977. He was commissioned in August 1984, and later graduated from Mary Washington College, Fredericksburg, Virginia, in 1989. Previously, he was the deputy commander of the 3rd Marine Expeditionary Forces

Marine Corps Brig. Gen. Timberlake was nominated for appointment to the rank of major general by the Secretary of Defense, Ash Carter, and was promoted. Timberlake at the time was serving as the director of manpower management in Quantico, Virginia. He has also served in Afghanistan. He was most recently the commanding general of the Third Marine Division.
