= William J. Bowers =

United States Marine Corps general

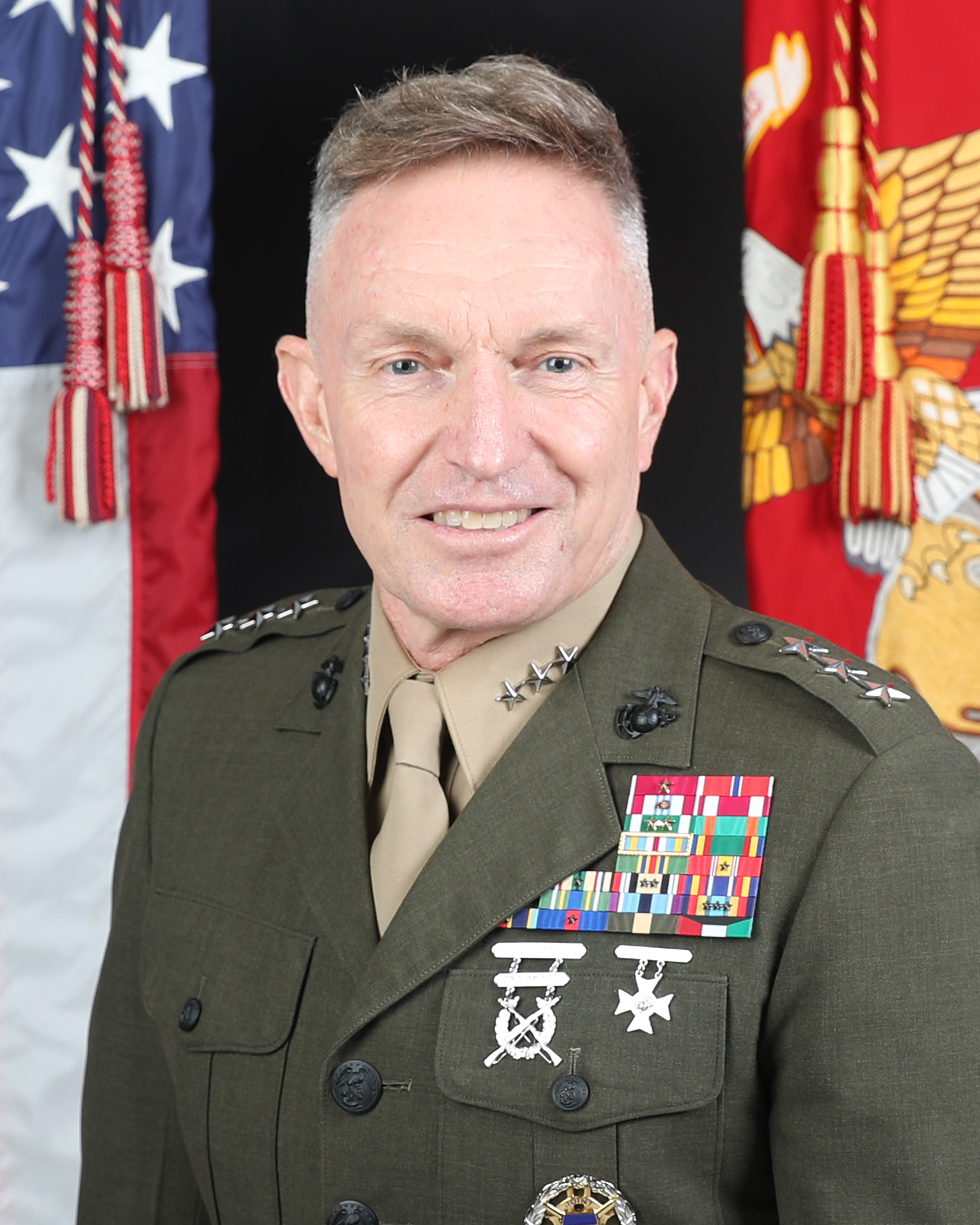
- Education: Virginia Military Institute; Naval Command and Staff College
- Military career
- Allegiance: United States
- Branch: United States Marine Corps
- Service years: 1990–present
- Rank: Lieutenant General
- Commands: Deputy Commandant Manpower and Reserve Affairs; Marine Corps Recruiting Command; Marine Corps Installations Pacific; Marine Corps UniversityPresident
- Conflicts: Iraq War
- Awards: Defense Meritorious Service Medal; Legion of Merit (2); Bronze Star Medal

William J. Bowers is a lieutenant general in the United States Marine Corp and currently serves as the Deputy Commandant for Manpower and Reserve Affairs.

== Military career ==
Throughout his career, he has served in every Marine expeditionary force, in every element of the Marine air–ground task force, and in most parts of the supporting establishment. He was commissioned in 1990 after graduating with distinction from Virginia Military Institute with a B.A. in history. After completing The Basic School and Marine Corps Engineer School, he served in a variety of assignments in the 1st Marine Expeditionary Brigade on Kāneʻohe Bay, Hawaii from 1991 to 1994. In June 1994, he reported to Marine Corps Recruit Depot San Diego and served as a Series commander, Company Commander and Regimental S-3A. After graduation from the U.S. Army's Engineer Officer Advanced Course in May 1997, he reported to 7th Engineer Support Battalion at Camp Pendleton, California and served as S-3A, Company Commander, Battalion Operations Officer and Executive officer.

In June 2000, he reported to Recruiting Station Lansing, Michigan and served as Commanding Officer until July 2003. In August 2003, he reported to the Naval Command and Staff College in Newport, Rhode Island, and then attended the School of Advanced Warfighting at Quantico, Virginia. He checked into III Marine Expeditionary Force in Okinawa, Japan in 2005 and served as the Operational Planning Team Branch Head for G-3, Future Operations. From Okinawa, he deployed to Iraq and served as a Plans Team Leader for Multi-National Force – Iraq. He assumed command of Marine Wing Support Squadron 273 in Beaufort, South Carolina in May 2007. After deploying with the squadron to Operation Iraqi Freedom in 2008–2009, he relinquished command in May 2009 and reported as a student to the National War College in Washington D.C. In June 2010, he reported to the Joint Staff, J-5 Directorate as the Strategy Concepts Branch Chief.

From 2012 to 2015, he commanded the 6th Marine Corps District at Marine Corps Recruit Depot Parris Island, South Carolina. From 2015 to 2017, he served as the Military Assistant to the 33rd and 34th Assistant Commandants of the Marine Corps. In July 2017 upon selection to Brigadier General, he was assigned as the President, Marine Corps University and Commanding General, Education Command. In July 2019, he assumed duties as Commanding General, Marine Corps Installations Pacific - Marine Corps Base Camp Smedley D. Butler, on Okinawa, Japan. He assumed command of Marine Corps Recruiting Command in July 2022 and became the Deputy Commandant for Manpower and Reserve Affairs in August 2025.

== Decorations ==
Lieutenant General Bowers’ personal decorations include the Legion of Merit (with gold star), the Bronze Star, the Defense Meritorious Service Medal (with oak leaf cluster), the Meritorious Service Medal, the Navy and Marine Corps Commendation Medal (with two gold stars), the Navy and Marine Corps Achievement Medal. He was the “Combat Engineer Officer of the Year” in 1998.
