= Allen H. Turnage =

United States Marine Corps general

Allen Hal Turnage
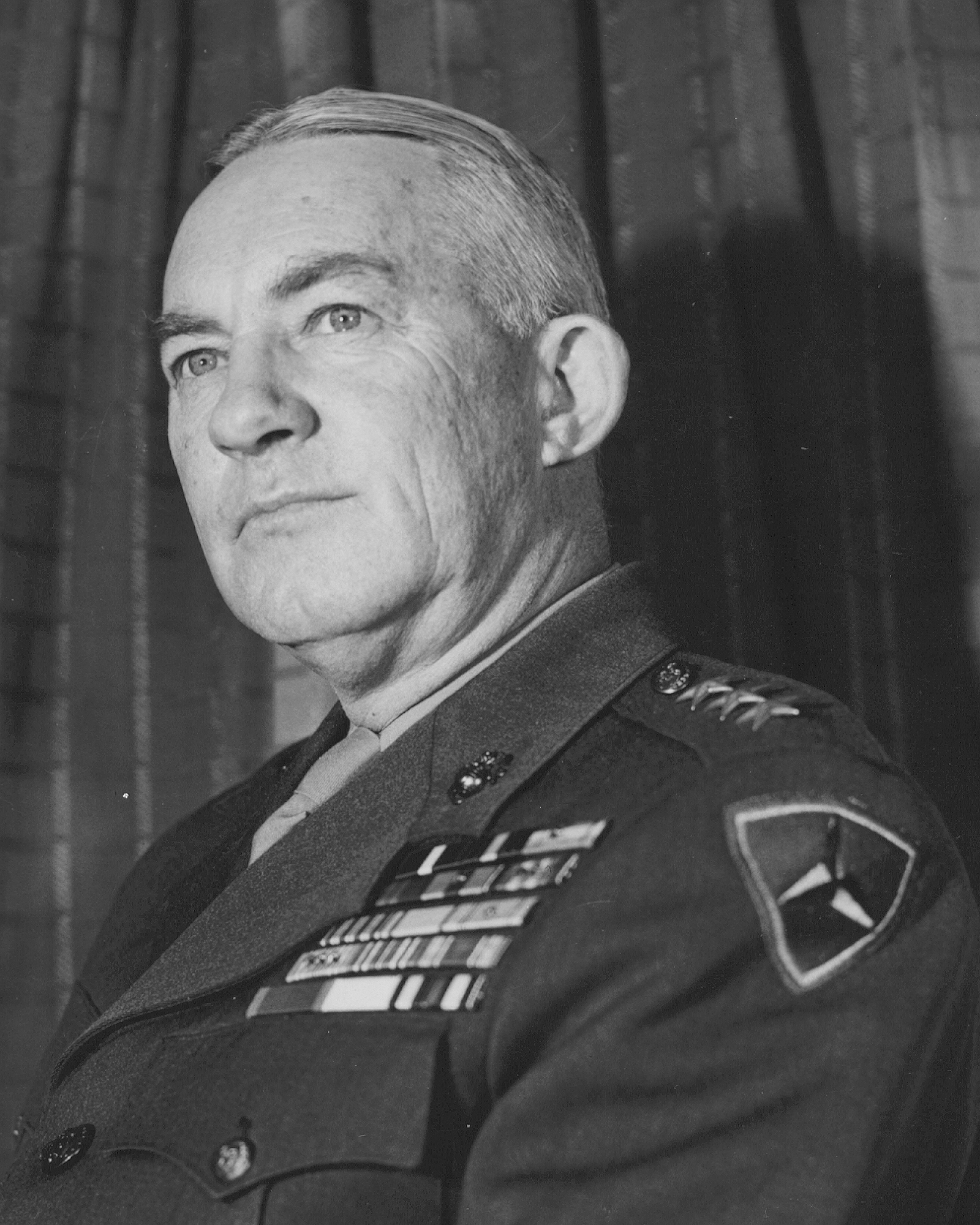
- Allen H. Turnage
- Born: January 3, 1891; Farmville, North Carolina, U.S.
- Died: October 22, 1971 (aged 80); Bethesda, Maryland, U.S.
- Military career
- Allegiance: United States
- Branch: United States Marine Corps
- Service years: 1913–1948
- Rank: General
- Service number: 0-997
- Commands: Machine Gun Battalion, 5th Marine Brigade; 1st Battalion, 5th Marines; Camp Lejeune; 3rd Marine Division; Assistant Commandant of the Marine Corps; Fleet Marine Force, Pacific
- Conflicts: Banana Wars; World War I World War II: Battle of Bougainville; Battle of Guam (1944)
- Awards: Navy Cross; Distinguished Service Medal; Legion of Merit

Allen Hal Turnage (January 3, 1891 – October 22, 1971) was a United States Marine Corps General who earned the Navy Cross and the Distinguished Service Medal while leading the 3rd Marine Division on Bougainville and Guam in World War II.

== Biography ==
General Turnage was born on January 3, 1891, in Farmville, North Carolina.

He attended the University of North Carolina before entering the Marine Corps as a second lieutenant on November 17, 1913. Following instruction for 17 months at the Marine Officers' School, Norfolk, Virginia, he joined the First Brigade in Haiti in 1915 and participated in expeditions against hostile Cacos in Northern Haiti, then was assigned to duty with the Haitian Constabulary until August 1918.

Almost immediately, he was sent to France, where he served as commanding officer of Machine Gun Battalion, 5th Marine Brigade. Following World War I, he was an instructor at the Marine Officers' School, Quantico; served with the Gendarmerie d'Haiti again from 1922 to 1925; and completed the Field Officers' Course at Quantico. Later, between two tours of duty at Headquarters Marine Corps, he was assigned sea duty on the staff of Battleship Divisions Four and Three.

In 1935, General Turnage was appointed director of the Marine Officers' Basic School at the Philadelphia Navy Yard, following which he served with the 1st Battalion, 5th Marines, as battalion commander and regimental executive officer, respectively. Ordered overseas in 1939, he served as commanding officer of Marine Forces in North China, and commanding officer of the Marine detachment, American embassy, Peiping. He returned to Headquarters Marine Corps in April 1941, and was serving as director of the Division of Plans and Policies when World War II broke out.

In June 1942, General Turnage was ordered to Marine Corps Base Camp Lejeune, North Carolina, to take command of the Base and its Training Center, which included the organization and training of two regimental combat teams for the 3rd Marine Division. That October, he joined the newly formed 3rd Marine Division as assistant division commander, becoming commanding general on Guadalcanal in September 1943. He then led the division in the landing at Empress Augusta Bay, Bougainville, 1943, and in the recapture of Guam, 1944.

After two years with the 3rd Division, in September 1944 General Turnage was assigned to Headquarters Marine Corps as director of personnel, and, later, as Assistant Commandant of the Marine Corps. In May 1946, his alma mater, the University of North Carolina, awarded him the honorary degree of Doctor of Laws. His final assignment was as commanding general, Fleet Marine Force, Pacific.

General Turnage retired from active duty on January 1, 1948, and was advanced to four-star rank on retirement by reason of having been specially commended for heroism in combat.

General Turnage lived in Alexandria, Virginia after retirement. He died at Bethesda Naval Hospital on October 22, 1971, and was interred with full military honors in Section 5 of Arlington National Cemetery. His wife, Hannah Pyke Torrey Turnage (October 23, 1895 – March 20, 1982), whom he married on July 21, 1920, is buried with him.

== Awards and decorations ==
General Turnage's awards include:

1st Row	Navy Cross			
2nd Row	Navy Distinguished Service Medal	Legion of Merit	Navy Presidential Unit Citation with one star	Navy Unit Commendation with two stars
3rd Row	Marine Corps Expeditionary Medal with one service star	Haitian Campaign Medal (1917)	World War I Victory Medal with France clasp & Maltese cross	Nicaraguan Campaign Medal (1933)
4th Row	China Service Medal	American Defense Service Medal with Base clasp	American Campaign Medal	Asiatic-Pacific Campaign Medal with three service stars
5th Row	World War II Victory Medal	Haitian Distinguished Service Medal	Dominican Order of Military Merit, 2nd Class with White Insignia	Nicaraguan Medal of Distinction w/ Diploma

=== Navy Cross citation ===
TURNAGE, ALLEN H.
Major General, U.S. Marine Corps
Commanding General, 3d Marine Division
Date of Action: November 1–27, 1943

Citation:

The Navy Cross is presented to Allen H. Turnage, Major General, U.S. Marine Corps, for extraordinary heroism as Commanding General of the Landing Force of the Third Marine Division (Reinforced), during the establishment of a beachhead in the Solomon Islands Area from November 1 to November 27, 1943. Leading his command with intrepidity and daring aggressiveness, major General Turnage frequently exposed himself to heavy enemy gunfire throughout the landing and operations essential to the attainment and consolidation of the final beachhead line at Empress August Bay, Bougainville Island. His conspicuous courage, distinguished leadership and resolute devotion to duty throughout this period were an inspiration to the officers and men in his command and in keeping with the highest traditions of the United States Naval Service.

SPOT AWARD, Serial 0049 (SofN Signed September 5, 1944)

== See also ==
- List of 3rd Marine Division Commanders
