= Robert E. Haebel =

United States Marine Corps general (1927–2017)

Robert Edward Haebel
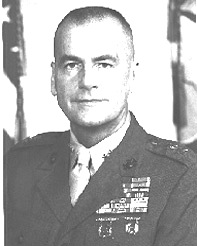
- Major General Robert E. Haebel
- Born: July 18, 1927; Marcus Hook, Pennsylvania, U.S.
- Died: May 25, 2017 (aged 89); San Diego, California, U.S.
- Burial place: Arlington National Cemetery
- Military career
- Allegiance: United States of America
- Branch: United States Marine Corps
- Service years: 1945–1987
- Rank: Major General
- Commands: 4th Marine Regiment; Camp Hansen; MCRD Parris Island; III Marine Amphibious Force; 3rd Marine Division; Camp Pendleton
- Conflicts: Korean War; Vietnam War
- Awards: Distinguished Service Medal; Legion of Merit; Bronze Star; Purple Heart (2)

Robert Edward Haebel (July 18, 1927 – May 25, 2017) was a United States Marine Corps major general whose last command was Marine Corps Base Camp Pendleton. He retired in 1987 after 42 years of service. He was interred with honors at Arlington National Cemetery September 16, 2017.

== Biography ==
Robert Haebel was born in Marcus Hook, Pennsylvania on July 18, 1927. He died on May 25, 2017, at the age of 89.

=== Education ===
He graduated from high school in 1945. He earned a Bachelor of Science degree in Education West Chester State Teachers College (now West Chester University of Pennsylvania) in 1951. He later earned two Master of Arts (M.A.) degrees — in Education from the University of New Mexico (1967) and in International Affairs from George Washington University (1971).

=== Marine Corps career ===
In June 1945, Haebel enlisted in the Marine Corps. He reached the rank of sergeant prior to attending The Basic School at Marine Corps Base Quantico, Virginia, receiving his commission as a second lieutenant in June 1951.

In January 1952, he was ordered to Korea and participated in combat operations as a platoon leader with the 1st Marine Division, earning the Bronze Star with Combat "V". He was transferred to Marine Corps Base Camp Lejeune, in December 1952, and was promoted to captain in March 1954.

He served at the Marine Barracks, Treasure Island, San Francisco, California, from December 1954 to April 1957, when he was assigned to the Military Assistance Advisory Group, Taiwan, as an advisor to the Republic of China Marine Corps.

Returning to the United States, he served at Headquarters, 5th Marine Corps Recruit Reserve District, Washington, D.C., and attended the Junior Course, Amphibious Warfare School, MCB Quantico. In June 1960 he was assigned to the 3rd Marine Division, serving as a company commander and G-3 Operations Officer.

He returned to Camp Lejeune and served in Force Troops, Fleet Marine Force, Atlantic. In April 1962, he was promoted to major.

He served as the Marine officer instructor, Naval Reserve Officer Training Corps (NROTC) Unit at the University of New Mexico, from August 1964 to July 1967, when he was transferred back to the 1st Marine Division in the Republic of Vietnam and served consecutively as operations officer, G-3 officer, and as a battalion commander. For his participation in combat operations in Vietnam, he was awarded the Legion of Merit with Combat "V". He was promoted to lieutenant colonel in November 1966.

Ordered to MCRD Parris Island, South Carolina, in September 1968, Haebel served as assistant G-3 officer, and later, as G-3 officer of the recruit depot. From August 1970 to June 1971, he attended the Naval War College, Newport, Rhode Island, and upon completing the course was transferred to Hawaii as plans officer, G-3 operations and training officer and assistant chief of staff, G-3 at Headquarters, Fleet Marine Force, Pacific. He was promoted to colonel in May 1972.

In June 1975, he was ordered to the 3rd Marine Division on Okinawa and served as commanding officer, 4th Marine Regiment and the camp commander, Camp Hansen, Okinawa. He was advanced to brigadier general on April 15, 1976, and assumed duties of commanding general, Force Troops/2nd Force Service Support Group, FMF, Atlantic, on April 23, 1976.

Ordered to Headquarters Marine Corps, Haebel assumed duty as director of Personnel Management Division on July 28, 1978. He was promoted to major general on July 3, 1979, and assigned additional duty as assistant deputy chief of staff for manpower in September 1979.

Haebel assumed duty as commanding general, Marine Corps Recruit Depot Parris Island, South Carolina, in July 1980. In June 1982, he was assigned duty as commanding general, III Marine Amphibious Force and commanding general, 3d Marine Division, FMF, Pacific on Okinawa. He served in this capacity until he became the commanding general of Camp Pendleton on July 6, 1984.

=== Retirement ===
Haebel retired from the Marine Corps on June 20, 1987, after 42 years of active duty service. On November 10, 2007, Haebel was the speaker at the 2007 Marine Corps Ball at Camp Pendleton, in honor of the Marine Corps' 232nd birthday.

== Awards and decorations ==
Haebel's decorations include:

| 1st Row | Navy Distinguished Service Medal | | | |
| 2nd Row | Legion of Merit with Combat "V" | Bronze Star with Combat "V" | Purple Heart with one 5/16" Gold Star | Combat Action Ribbon |
| 3rd Row | Navy Presidential Unit Citation | Navy Unit Commendation | Navy Meritorious Unit Commendation | World War II Victory Medal |
| 4th Row | National Defense Service Medal with one star | Korean Service Medal | Armed Forces Expeditionary Medal | Vietnam Service Medal |
| 5th Row | Korean Presidential Unit Citation | Vietnam Gallantry Cross unit citation | United Nations Korea Medal | Vietnam Campaign Medal |
