= Frederick M. Padilla =

U.S. Marine major general (b. 1959)

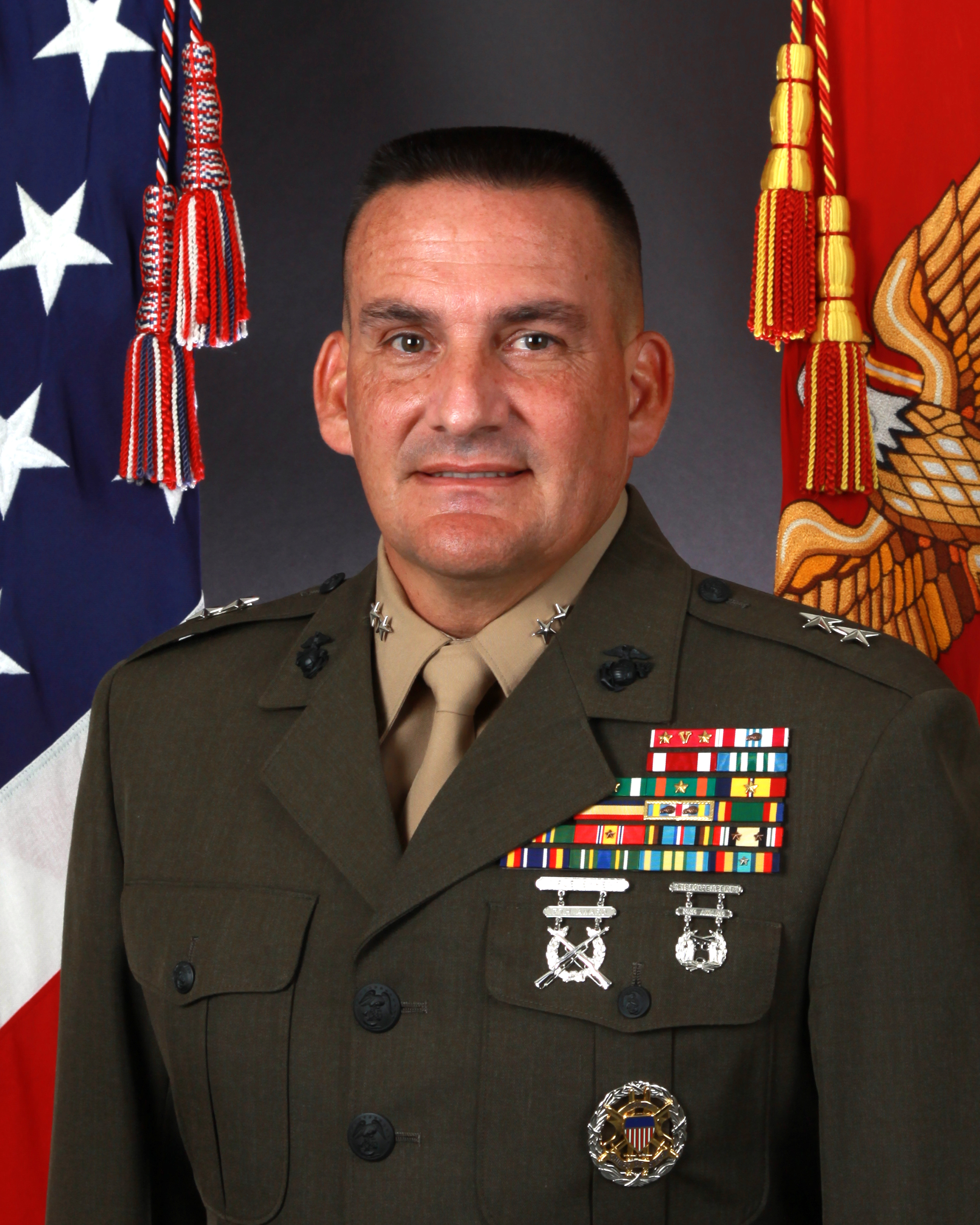
- Born: April 1959 (age 67); Torrejón de Ardoz, Spain
- Military career
- Allegiance: United States of America
- Branch: United States Marine Corps
- Service years: 1983–2019
- Rank: Major General
- Commands: National Defense University; 3rd Marine Division; Marine Corps Recruit Depot Parris Island; 1st Battalion, 5th Marines
- Conflicts: Somalia; Iraq
- Awards: Navy Distinguished Service Medal

Frederick M. Padilla is a retired U.S. Marine major general. Padilla previously served as commanding general of 3rd Marine Division.

== Marine Corps career ==
Padilla was commissioned in the United States Marine Corps as a second lieutenant in 1983 after graduation from East Carolina University. He graduated from The Basic School at Marine Corps Base Quantico. Between 1988 and 1990 he was the commanding officer of the Marine Detachment (MARDET) on board the USS Canopus (AS-34). He served with 3rd Battalion, 6th Marines as platoon commander, company commander and battalion adjutant. His next assignment was with 3rd Battalion, 9th Marines as rifle and weapons company commander followed by assignment as inspector-instructor, weapons company, 2nd Battalion, 23rd Marines. He attended the Marine Corps Amphibious Warfare School, Air Command and Staff College and the Armed Forces Staff College. As a lieutenant colonel, Padilla was assigned as commanding officer, 1st Battalion, 5th Marines. Padilla later earned a Master of Arts degree in national security and strategic studies from Naval War College, Newport, Rhode Island. He was selected for promotion to colonel in March 2005.

His staff and command assignments include command adjutant, Marine Aircraft Group 42; commanding officer, Marine detachment, USS Canopus (AS-34); G-3 operations officer, 1st Marine Division; commanding officer, School of Infantry-West; and chief of staff, Marine Corps Combat Development Command; plans officer, J3/5 and secretary of the joint staff; and branch chief for the Joint Requirements Oversight Council (J8) on the joint staff in the Pentagon. Padilla was selected for promotion to brigadier general in May 2009. Padilla was assigned as commanding general of Marine Corps Recruit Depot Parris Island and Eastern Recruiting Region, South Carolina. As a major general, Padilla assumed command of 3rd Marine Division from July 1, 2011 to July 12, 2013. His next assignment was as director of operations with plans, policies and operations, Headquarters Marine Corps. Padilla served as 15th president of National Defense University from 2014 to 2017. His final assignment was as the acting director of the Marine Corps Staff at Headquarters Marine Corps in the Pentagon.

In July 2018, Padilla was nominated for promotion to lieutenant general and assignment as commander of Marine Forces Reserve, but his nomination was not approved by the Senate Committee on Armed Services. He retired in 2019.

== Awards and decorations ==
U.S. military decorations
Navy Distinguished Service Medal
Defense Superior Service Medal
Legion of Merit with Combat Distinguishing Device with two gold award stars
Defense Meritorious Service Medal with oak leaf cluster
Meritorious Service Medal
Joint Service Commendation Medal
Navy and Marine Corps Commendation Medal with gold award star
Navy and Marine Corps Achievement Medal with gold award star
Combat Action Ribbon with gold award star
U.S. Unit Awards
Presidential Unit Citation
Joint Meritorious Unit Award with three oak leaf clusters.
Navy Unit Commendation
Navy Meritorious Unit Commendation
U.S. Service (Campaign) Medals and Service and Training Ribbons
National Defense Service Medal with bronze service star
Armed Forces Expeditionary Medal
Iraq Campaign Medal with two bronze campaign stars
Global War on Terrorism Service Medal
Korea Defense Service Medal
Navy Sea Service Deployment Ribbon with one silver and two bronze service stars

U.S. badges, patches and tabs
Rifle Expert Badge
Pistol Expert Badge
Joint Chiefs of Staff Badge
