= Marine Corps Recruiting Command =

U.S. Marine Corps' primary source of recruitment

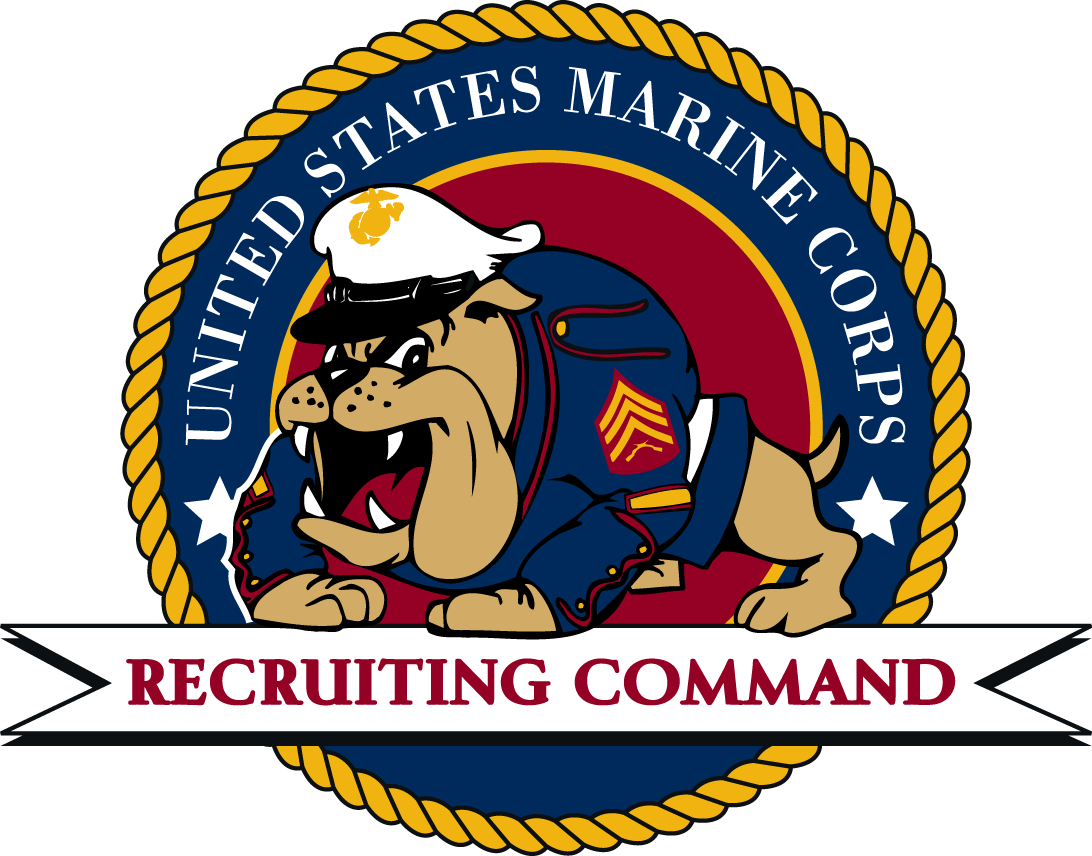
- Recruiters School logo
- Country: United States
- Branch: United States Marine Corps
- Role: military recruitment
- Headquarters: Marine Corps Base Quantico

Commanders
- Commander: Lieutenant General William J. Bowers

The Marine Corps Recruiting Command is a command of the United States Marine Corps responsible for military recruitment of civilians into the Corps. In addition to finding volunteers to join, it is also responsible for preparing them for United States Marine Corps Recruit Training or Officer Candidates School.

== History ==
With the founding of the Corps in 1775, the first recruiting drive was held at Tun Tavern in Philadelphia. At the time, the recruiting of volunteers was the responsibility of the various barracks commanders scattered throughout the United States to guard naval installations and man ships. Recruiting posters through to the American Civil War promised prospective recruits of bounties and prizes for service at sea.

After the end of the draft in the United States in 1972, recruiters had to shift from merely processing recruits to actively seeking and encouraging them to join an all-volunteer force.

Because there are Marine installations in relatively few states, Marine recruiters are typically the public face of the Corps, seen most commonly by the civilian population.

== Recruiting ==
Recruiters serve as the entry into the Corps through a variety of means. While the majority of accessions are enlisted, those who qualify can attempt to earn a commission and become an officer. Recruiting is a complex process that involves two main focuses, prospecting and selling. Prospecting, which is done through various means such as cold calling lists, sending messages through social media, and conducting events at highschools, is how a recruiter canvasses an area for potential applicants. Selling is done using the MC3 (Marine Corps communication and consulting) skills taught at the recruiter school, which are a needs based sales approach of uncovering "needs" and "motivators" in order to show a potential applicant why they might want to become a Marine.

All potential recruits are screened by recruiters for physical standards and fitness, adequate education (a high school diploma or equivalent, such as a GED for enlisted, and a bachelor's degree for officers), lack of significant civil convictions, lack of significant drug use, and other qualifiers. The Armed Services Vocational Aptitude Battery is administered to determine qualifications for a job field (known as a Military Occupational Specialty).

Enlisted Marines who qualify and successfully process through a Military Entrance Processing Station can ship to recruit training. Recruits from the 1st, 4th, and 6th Marine Corps Districts will attend Marine Corps Recruit Depot Parris Island, while males from the 8th, 9th, and 12th will attend Marine Corps Recruit Depot San Diego. Historically, enlisted females attended recruit training at Parris Island, regardless of district, but in February 2021, the first female recruits began training at MCRD San Diego.

Officers can be sourced from several veins: Officer Selection by Recruiting Stations, Naval Reserve Officer Training Corps, and enlisted commissioning. The vast majority will train at Officer Candidates School, but some will attend the Naval Academy instead.

== Structure ==
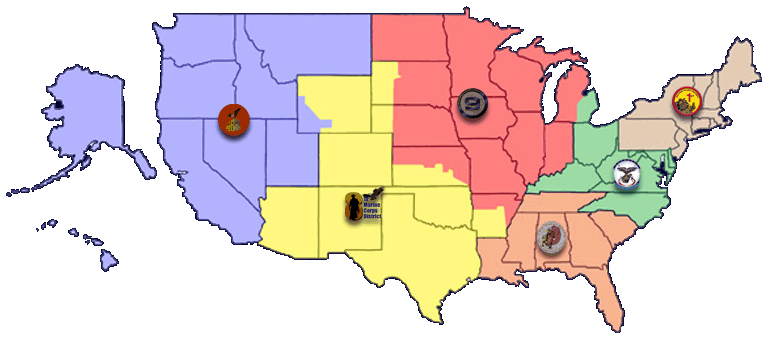
Map of the Recruiting Districts

For the purposes of recruiting Marines, the United States is divided into two regions. The Eastern Recruiting Region mostly covers districts east of the Mississippi River. The Western Recruiting Region predominately covers districts west of the Mississippi.

The two regions are divided into three districts each, each comprising several states. These are subdivided into Recruiting Stations (RS) located in large metropolitan areas, with smaller Recruiting Sub-Stations (RSS) covering smaller cities and rural areas. Some Recruiting Sub-Stations (RSS) have even smaller satellite offices called Permanent Contact Stations (PCS) often staffed by a single Recruiter.

The Marine Corps Recruiting Command has approximately 3,000 recruiters operating out of 48 Recruiting Stations, 574 Recruiting Sub-Stations, and 71 Officer Selection Sites across the continental United States, Alaska, Hawaii, Puerto Rico and Guam.

=== 1st Marine Corps District ===
The 1st Marine Corps District covers the northeast United States, including New England. It is the only District within the Marine Corps Recruiting Command to command an installation.

It has the following Recruiting Stations:

- RS Albany
- RS Baltimore
- RS Harrisburg
- RS New Jersey
- RS New York
- RS Pittsburgh
- RS Boston
- RS Springfield

=== 4th Marine Corps District ===
As of 2023, the district headquarters is in Columbus, Ohio, and covers 10 states and Washington D.C.

It has the following Recruiting Stations:

- RS Ohio
- RS Lansing, Michigan
- RS Louisville, Kentucky
- RS Nashville, Tennessee
- RS Raleigh, North Carolina
- RS Richmond, Virginia
- RS Charlotte, North Carolina

=== 6th Marine Corps District ===
The 6th Marine Corps District covers Southeastern United States (mostly the Deep South), as well as Puerto Rico and the United States Virgin Islands. It is headquartered at Marine Corps Recruit Depot Parris Island, in South Carolina.

It has the following Recruiting Stations:

- RS Atlanta
- RS Baton Rouge
- RS Columbia
- RS Ft. Lauderdale
- RS Jacksonville
- RS Montgomery
- RS Orlando
- RS Tampa
- PSRS 6

=== 8th Marine Corps District ===
The 8th Marine Corps District covers the southern half of Central United States and southern Mountain States, and is headquartered at NAS Fort Worth JRB on the west side of Fort Worth, Texas.

It has the following Recruiting Stations:

- RS Albuquerque
- RS Dallas
- RS Austin, Texas
- RS Fort Worth
- RS Houston
- RS Phoenix
- RS San Antonio
- RS South Texas

=== 9th Marine Corps District ===
The 9th Marine Corps District covers the majority of the Midwestern United States. and is headquartered in Naval Station Great Lakes, IL.

It has the following Recruiting Stations:

- RS Kansas City
- RS Chicago
- RS Denver
- RS Des Moines
- RS Indianapolis
- RS St. Louis
- RS Milwaukee
- RS Twin Cities
- RS Oklahoma City

=== 12th Marine Corps District ===
The 12th Marine Corps District covers much of the Western United States, Alaska, Hawaii, and Pacific territories, and is headquartered at Marine Corps Recruit Depot San Diego.

It has the following Recruiting Stations:

- RS Seattle
- RS Portland
- RS Sacramento
- RS San Francisco
- RS Los Angeles
- RS San Diego
- RS Orange County
- RS Riverside

== See also ==
- Berkeley Marine Corps Recruiting Center controversy
- Recruiting Service Ribbon

Comparable organizations

- United States Army Recruiting Command
- United States Navy Recruiting Command
- Air Education and Training Command (U.S. Air Force)
