= III Marine Expeditionary Force =

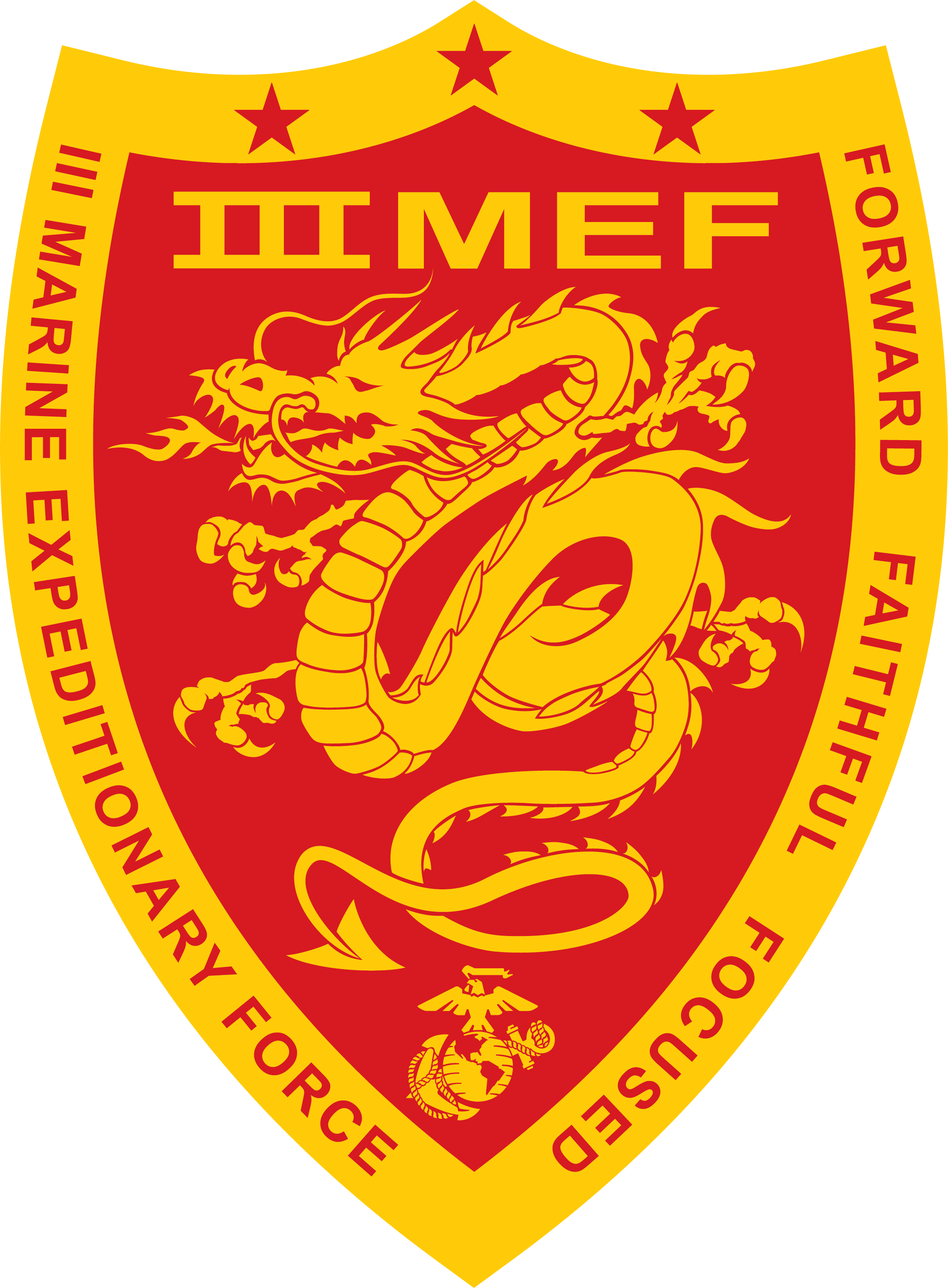
- III Marine Expeditionary Force insignia
- Active: 1942–46, 1965–present
- Country: United States of America
- Branch: United States Marine Corps
- Type: Marine Air-Ground Task Force
- Role: Forward-deployed expeditionary force
- Size: ~27,000
- Part of: Marine Forces Pacific
- Garrison/HQ: Camp Courtney, Okinawa, Japan
- Mottos: Forward, Faithful, Focused
- March: "Fight Now" by Michael Andrew Newell
- Engagements: World War II: Operation Cartwheel; Operation Stalemate II; Operation Forager; Operation Iceberg; Operation Beleaguer; Vietnam War: Battle of Huế; Persian Gulf War: Operation Desert Shield; Operation Desert Storm; Operation Provide Comfort; Operation Sea Angel; Operation Fiery Vigil; Operation Restore Hope; Global War on Terrorism: Operation Enduring Freedom; Iraq War: Operation Iraqi Freedom; Operation Unified Assistance; Operation Tomodachi; Operation Damayan
- Website: iiimef.marines.mil

Commanders
- Current commander: Lt. Gen. Benjamin T. Watson
- Notable commanders: Alexander Vandegrift; William R. Collins; Herman Nickerson Jr. Donn J. Robertson; Lewis W. Walt; Robert E. Cushman Jr. Carl W. Hoffman

III Marine Expeditionary Force (III MEF) is a formation of the Marine Air-Ground Task Force of the United States Marine Corps. It is forward-deployed and able to rapidly conduct operations across the spectrum from humanitarian assistance and disaster relief (HA/DR) to amphibious assault and high-intensity combat.

It maintains a forward presence in Japan and Asia to support the Treaty of Mutual Cooperation and Security between the United States and Japan (1960) and other alliance relationships of the United States. III MEF also conducts combined operations and training throughout the region in support of the National Security Strategy for Theater Security Cooperation.

The Marines and sailors of III MEF engage in more than 65 combined, bilateral and multilateral training exercises annually throughout the Asia-Pacific region, in countries including treaty allies Japan, Thailand, South Korea, the Philippines, and Australia. These exercises build partner capacity, develop and maintain strong regional alliances and military-to-military contacts. These exercises prepare III MEF to conduct operations ranging from major combat operations to humanitarian assistance and disaster relief.

III MEF has played a significant role in humanitarian assistance and disaster relief missions throughout the region. The MEF assisted the relief efforts led by the Government of Japan during Operation Tomodachi after the 2011 Tōhoku earthquake and tsunami. III MEF also conducted HA/DR missions in Thailand in October 2011, the Philippines in October 2010, and Indonesia in October 2009. Most recently in response to the resulting humanitarian crisis from Typhoon Haiyan which struck the Philippines in 2013, III MEF activated as Joint Task Force 505 to conduct humanitarian assistance and disaster relief operations in support of the Philippine government. More than 2,495 tons of relief supplies were delivered, and over 21,000 people were evacuated.

== Mission ==
Commanded by a lieutenant general with its headquarters at Camp Courtney, III MEF's mission is to provide forward based and deployed forces to the commander, U.S. Indo-Pacific Command, to conduct Phase 0 engagement and theater security cooperation events, support contingencies and emergent requirements, and prepare to rapidly execute existing operations plans in support of the theater and national military strategies.

III MEF is organized as a Marine Air Ground Task Force (MAGTF) to provide a rapidly deployable, flexible self-contained fighting force. The Marines combine air, ground, and logistics forces to operate as a coherent, self-sufficient force. Each mission dictates the MAGTF's scale and structure, giving the Marine Corps the flexibility to respond to any crisis and making a "force in readiness." A MEF is the largest of all MAGTFs.

== History ==
III Marine Expeditionary Force was activated as I Marine Amphibious Corps 1 October 1942 in Camp Elliott, San Diego, California. Later that month, they were deployed to Noumea, New Caledonia. The unit was redesignated as III Amphibious Corps 15 April 1944. III Amphibious Corps was deactivated on 10 June 1946.

III Marine Expeditionary Force was activated 6 May 1965 at Da Nang, Republic of Vietnam. III MEF was re-designated to III Marine Amphibious Force (III MAF) 7 May 1965.

III Marine Amphibious Force deployed to Camp Courtney, Okinawa April 1971. III MAF was redesignated to III Marine Expeditionary Force 5 February 1988.

=== World War II ===
During World War II, III MEF was known as I Marine Amphibious Corps. It was renamed III Amphibious Corps on 15 April 1944, and took part in fighting against the Japanese Empire in the Pacific theater during World War II. It fought in some of the bloodiest battles, including the Solomon Islands campaign, the Mariana and Palau Islands campaign and the Volcano and Ryukyu Islands campaign (namely the Battle of Okinawa). III Amphibious Corps redeployed to Tianjin, China, in September 1945, where it participated in the occupation of Northern China until June 1946, as part of Operation Beleaguer. III Amphibious Corps was deactivated on 10 June 1946.

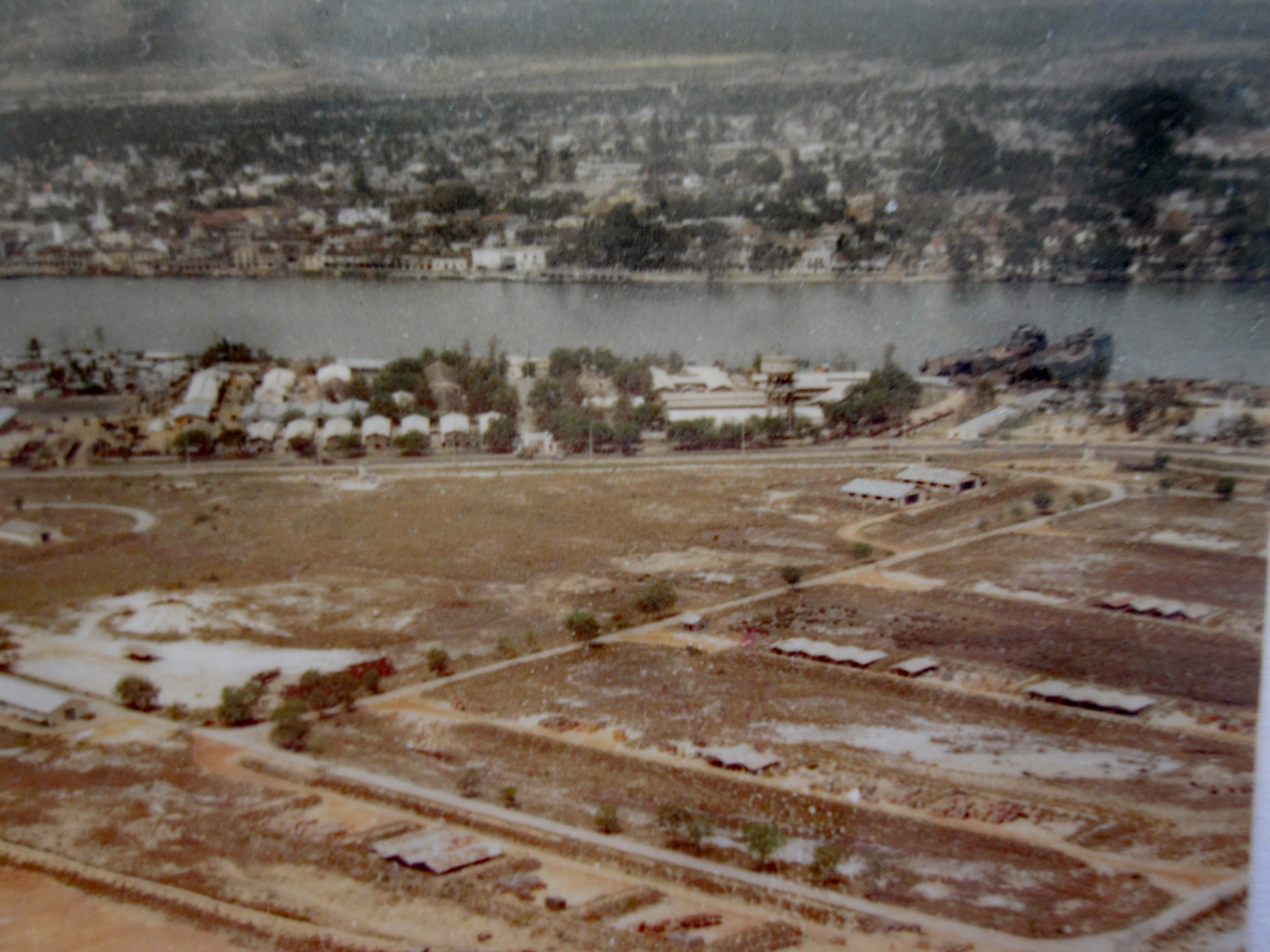
Camp Horn, III MAF Headquarters, Da Nang

=== Vietnam War ===
III MEF was reactivated 6 May 1965 in Da Nang, Republic of Vietnam under Major General William R. Collins. 7 May 1965, III MEF was re-designated as III Marine Amphibious Force (III MAF) and consisted of the 1st Marine Division, 3rd Marine Division and the 1st Marine Aircraft Wing. The III MAF's area of operations was in the northern I Corps Tactical Zone. III MAF participated in the Vietnam War from May 1965 – April 1971 operating from Quang Tri, Thua Thien, Quang Nam, Quang Tin, and Quang Ngai. III MAF deployed to Camp Courtney, Okinawa in April 1971.

=== 1990s–2010s ===
Since III MAF was redesignated to III Marine Expeditionary Force (III MEF) 5 February 1988, they have participated in many different operations. These operations include the Persian Gulf War's Operation Desert Shield, Operation Desert Storm, as well as Operation Provide Comfort in Southwest Asia and Iraq from Sept. 1990 – April 1991 and May–June 1991. III MEF elements have also played a vital role in Operation Sea Angel in Bangladesh from May–June 1991; Operation Fiery Vigil in the Philippines June 1991; Operation Restore Hope and Operation Continue Hope in Somalia from December 1992 to March 1994. III MEF elements have also had a significant impact on the Iraq War's Operation Iraqi Freedom as well as the Global War on Terrorism's Enduring Freedom.

One of the biggest roles III MEF plays in the Asia-Pacific region is humanitarian assistance and disaster relief (HA/DR). III MEF elements participated in Operation Unified Assistance in response to the tsunami disaster in Southeast Asia from December 2004 to February 2005. III MEF has also assisted with the 2005 Kashmir earthquake response from October 2005 to March 2006; Philippine mudslide response in March and April 2006; 2006 Yogyakarta earthquake response in May and June 2006; Legazpi typhoon recovery in March 2007; 2007 Solomon Islands earthquake and tsunami response in April 2007; Operation Sea Angel II in Bangladesh from November to December 2007; Operation Caring Response in Burma from May and June 2008; Taiwan typhoon relief in August 2009; Philippine typhoon and Indonesian earthquake relief in October 2009; Philippine typhoon relief in October 2010; Operation Tomodachi in May 2011; Thailand flood relief from October through November 2011; and Philippine typhoon relief in December 2012 and again in November 2013.

== Organization ==
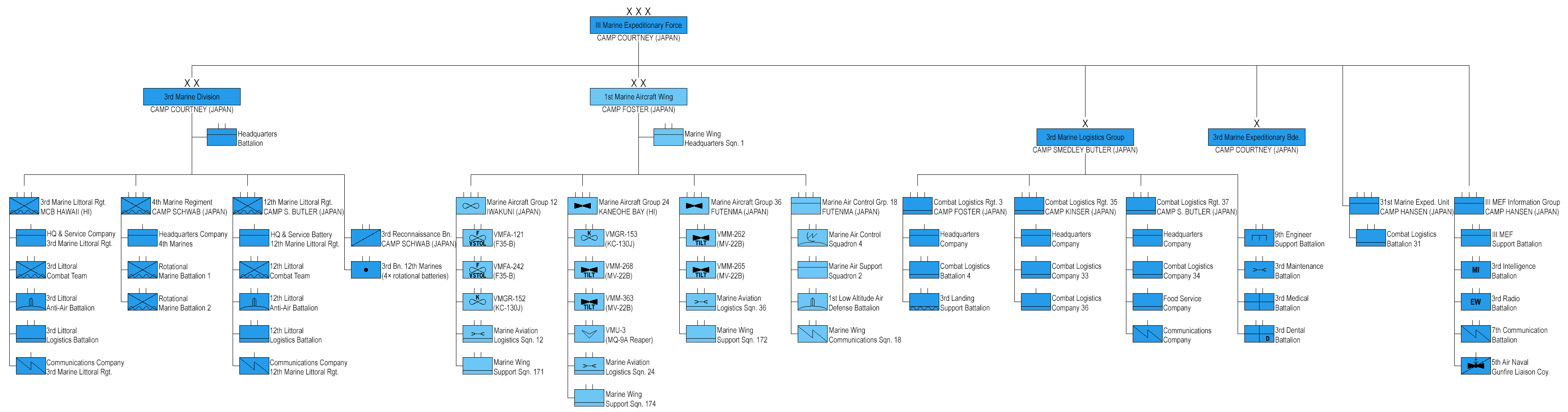
III Marine Expeditionary Force organization as of May 2026 (click to enlarge)

=== Units ===
III Marine Expeditionary Force, together with I Marine Expeditionary Force, makes up Marine Forces, Pacific.

- Ground combat element: 3rd Marine Division
- Aviation combat element: 1st Marine Aircraft Wing
- Logistics combat element: 3rd Marine Logistics Group
- Command element: III Marine Expeditionary Force Information Group
  - III MEF Support Battalion
  - 3rd Intelligence Battalion
  - 3rd Radio Battalion
  - 7th Communication Battalion
  - 5th Air Naval Gunfire Liaison Company (ANGLICO)
- 3rd Marine Expeditionary Brigade
- 31st Marine Expeditionary Unit

== III MEF Band ==
As the Eastern Hemisphere’s sole musical representative of the United States Marine Corps, the III MEF Band enjoys a busy schedule filled with performances across Okinawa and the Indo-Pacific region each year. The band capitalizes on this unique position by making it a priority to present community outreach performances and by participating in bi-lateral engagements with partner and allied nations throughout Asia and the Pacific. Consisting of musicians trained in a variety of musical styles, the III MEF Band is able to provide a number of small ensembles for civilian events, including brass and woodwind quintets, jazz combo, rock band, and brass band. The band was awarded the title of 2018 Marine Corps Band of the Year in February 2018. The III MEF Band was most recently award the 2023 Colonel George S. Howard Citation of Musical Excellence for Military Concert Bands.

The following comprises the leadership of the band:

- Band Officer – Captain Randel Metzinger
- Enlisted Bandleader – Master Sergeant James Holt
- Instrument Repair Technician – Gunnery Sergeant Mathew Medina
- Enlisted Conductor – Gunnery Sergeant Martin Arreola Jr
- Drum Major – Staff Sergeant Peter Yurkovich
- Production Manager – Gunnery Sergeant Joshua W. Waldie

Uniquely, the band used to have its own mascot. The history of the use of a mascot dates back to 1974, when the Commanding General of the 1st Marine Aircraft Wing presented a Golden Retriever to the 1st MAW Band. Since then, the 1st MAW and 3D MARDIV Bands combined to form the III MEF Band and five mascots have served the unit. Since November of 2012, Sgt Chopper V continued this unique tradition and retired in 2024 after serving the Marines of the III MEF Band faithfully and honorably.

== Locations and units ==
=== Japan ===
==== Okinawa ====
- Marine Corps Base Camp Smedley D. Butler
- Marine Corps Air Station Futenma
- III Marine Expeditionary Force Command Element (III MEF CE)
- III Marine Expeditionary Force Headquarters Group (III MHG)
- III Marine Expeditionary Force Headquarters and Service Company (III MEF HQSVC)
- 3rd Marine Expeditionary Brigade (3rd MEB)
- 3rd Marine Division (3rd MarDiv)
- 1st Marine Aircraft Wing (1st MAW)
- 3rd Marine Logistics Group (3rd MLG)
- 31st Marine Expeditionary Unit (31st MEU)

==== Honshu ====
- Camp Fuji
- Marine Corps Air Station Iwakuni
- Marine Aircraft Group 12
- Combat Logistics Company 36

=== United States ===
==== Hawaii ====
- Marine Corps Air Station Kaneohe Bay
- 3rd Marine Regiment
- Marine Aircraft Group 24
- Combat Logistics Battalion 3
- Combat Logistics Company 33
- Combat Logistics Company 35

=== South Korea ===
- Camp Mujuk

== List of commanders ==
No.	Commander		Term			Ref
No.	Portrait	Name	Took office	Left office	Term length	Ref
-	Lawrence D. Nicholson	Lieutenant General; Lawrence D. Nicholson (born 1956)	11 September 2015	2 August 2018	2 years, 325 days	
-	Eric M. Smith	Lieutenant General; Eric M. Smith	2 August 2018	31 May 2019	302 days	
-	H. Stacy Clardy	Lieutenant General; H. Stacy Clardy (born 1960)	31 May 2019	9 November 2021	2 years, 162 days	
-	James W. Bierman Jr.	Lieutenant General; James W. Bierman Jr. (born 1965)	9 November 2021	26 January 2024	2 years, 78 days	
-	Roger B. Turner	Lieutenant General; Roger B. Turner	26 January 2024	15 July 2026	2 years, 266 days	
-	Benjamin T. Watson	Lieutenant General; Benjamin T. Watson	15 July 2026	Incumbent	96 days	

== Awards and decorations ==
Streamer	Award	Year(s)	Additional Info
	Navy Unit Commendation Streamer with two Bronze Stars	1965–1968, 1968–1971, 2001–2003	Vietnam War, Iraq War, War in Afghanistan
	Meritorious Unit Commendation Streamer with one Bronze Star	2004–2005 2019-2021	Iraq War, War in Afghanistan, War on Terror
	Asiatic-Pacific Campaign	1942–1946	World War II
	World War II Victory	1945	World War II
	China Service	1945–1946	Occupation of North China
	National Defense Service Streamer with two Bronze Stars	1961–1974, 1990–1995, 2001–present	Vietnam War, Persian Gulf War's Operation Desert Shield and Desert Storm, Iraq War's Operation Iraqi Freedom and Enduring Freedom
	Vietnam Service Streamer with two Silver and three Bronze Stars	1965–1971	Quang Tri, Thua Thien, Quang Nam, Quang Tin, and Quang Ngai
	Global War on Terrorism Service Streamer	2001–present	
	Vietnam Gallantry Cross with Palm Streamer	1965–1971	Foreign award from South Vietnam
	Republic of Vietnam Meritorious Unit Citation Civil Actions Streamer	1965–1971	Foreign award from South Vietnam

== Notable former members ==
- William R. Collins, commanding general in the Vietnam War 1965
- Robert E. Cushman Jr., commanding general in the Vietnam War 1967–1969
- Leo J. Dulacki, served as chief of staff in the Vietnam War 1969–1970
- Roy Geiger, commanding general in World War II
- Carl W. Hoffman, commanding general in the Vietnam War 1974–1975
- William G. Joslyn served as chief of staff in the Vietnam War 1970–1971
- Keith B. McCutcheon, commanding general in the Vietnam War 1970–1971
- Herman Nickerson Jr., commanding general in the Vietnam War 1969–1970
- Earl S. Piper, served as logistics officer in North China 1945–1946
- Jonas M. Platt, served as chief of staff in the Vietnam War 1965–1966
- Herman Poggemeyer Jr., commanding general in the Vietnam War 1973–1974
- Donn J. Robertson, commanding general in the Vietnam War 1970–1972
- Michael P. Ryan, commanding general in the Vietnam War 1973
- Lawrence F. Snowden, served as operations officer in the Vietnam War 1966–1967
- Rathvon M. Tompkins, served as deputy commander in the Vietnam War 1968
- William J. Van Ryzin, served as deputy commander in the Vietnam War 1968
- Lewis William Walt, commanding general in the Vietnam War 1965–1967
- Herbert L. Wilkerson, served as operations officer in the Vietnam War 1970
- Carl A. Youngdale, served as deputy commander in the Vietnam War 1968–1969

== Gallery ==
NATO Symbol

III

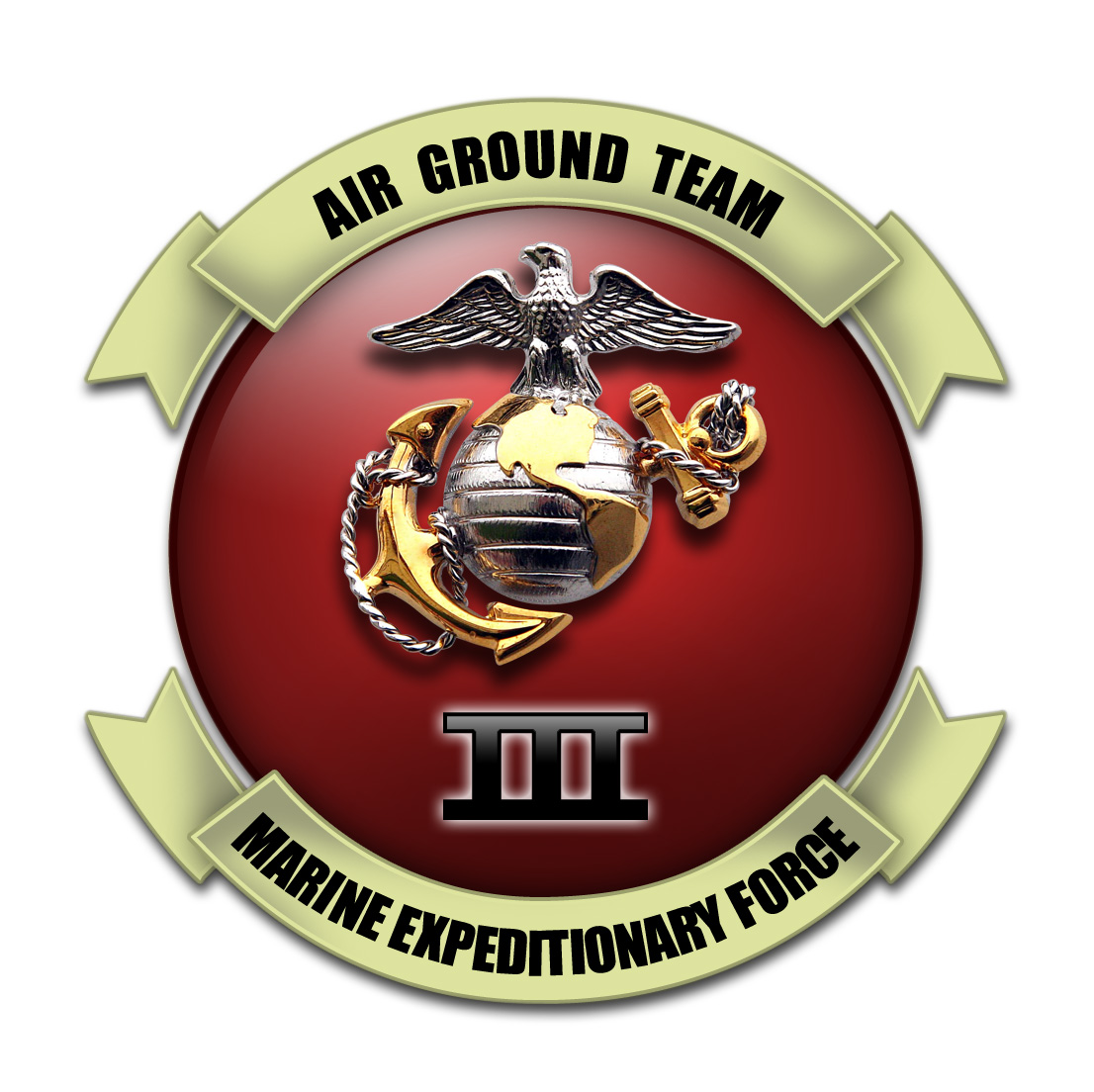

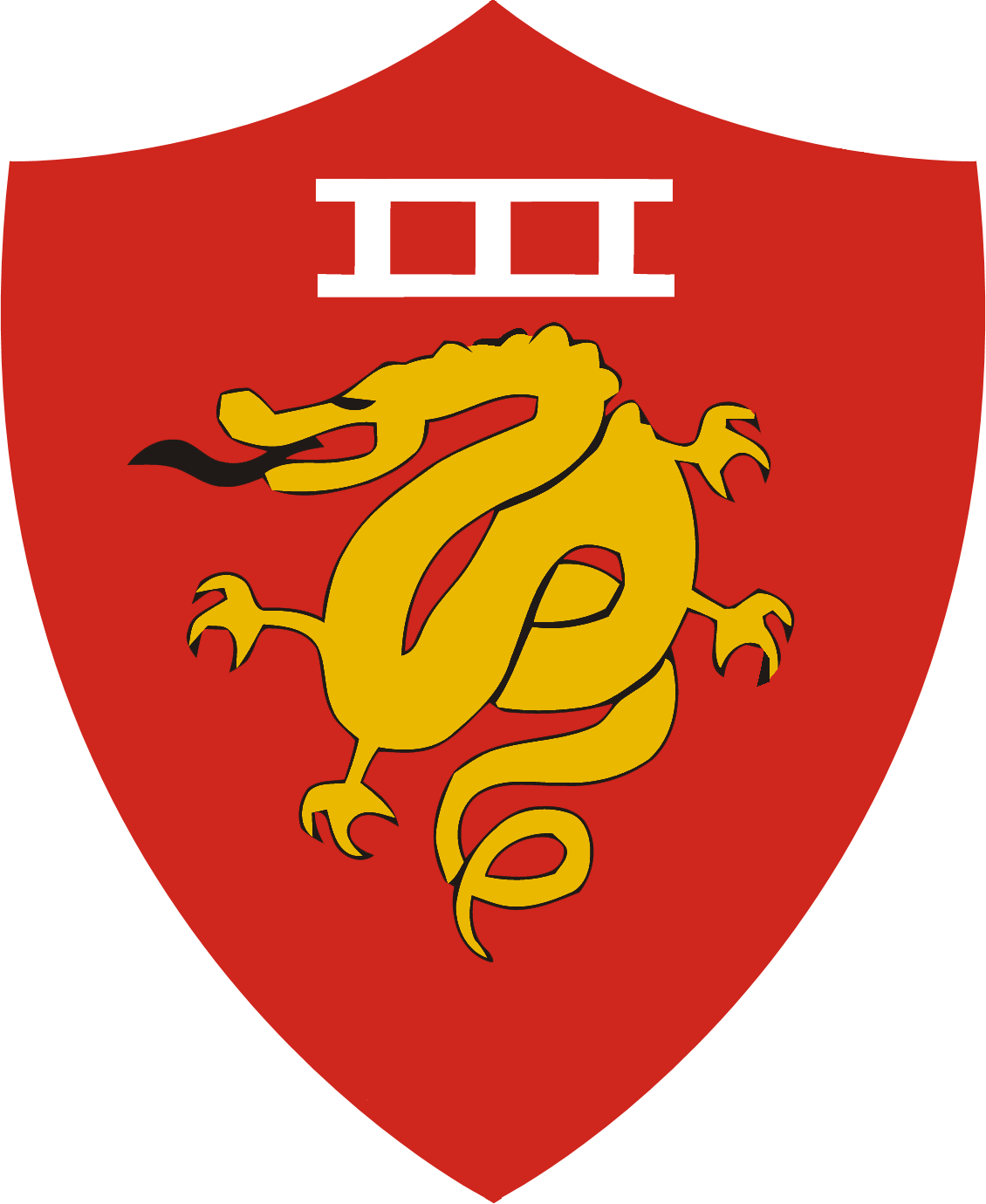

== See also ==
- List of corps of the United States

== Notes ==
Citations

References used

- "Joint Task Force 505 Activates for Operation Damayan". DoD News. U.S. Department of Defense. Archived from the original on 14 July 2015.
- "III MEF Lineage and Honors" (PDF). USMC History Division. Archived from the original (PDF) on 2 April 2015.
- Lum, Thomas; Margesson, Rhoda. "Typhoon Haiyan (Yolanda): U.S. and International Response to Philippines Disaster" (PDF). Congressional Research Service. Federation of American Scientists.
- Manning, Matthew. "Constant Vigilance readies Kinser, community for disaster response". USMC News. USMC official website.
