= Organization of the United States Marine Corps =

The United States Marine Corps is organized within the Department of the Navy, which is led by the secretary of the Navy (SECNAV). The most senior Marine commissioned officer is the commandant of the Marine Corps, responsible for organizing, recruiting, training, and equipping the Marine Corps so that it is ready for operation under the command of the unified combatant commanders. The Marine Corps is organized into four principal subdivisions: Headquarters Marine Corps, the Operating Forces, the Supporting Establishment, and the Marine Forces Reserve.

The Operating Forces are further subdivided into three categories: Marine forces assigned to unified combatant commands, Marine Corps Security Forces guarding naval installations, and Marine Security Guard detachments at American embassies. Under the "Forces for Unified Commands" memo, Marine forces are assigned to each of the regional unified combatant commands at the discretion of the secretary of defense and with the approval of the president. Since 1991, the Marine Corps has maintained component headquarters at each of the regional unified combatant commands.

Marine Corps Forces are further divided into Marine Forces Command (consisting of II Marine Expeditionary Force) and Marine Forces Pacific (I Marine Expeditionary Force and III Marine Expeditionary Force). The commander of the former also serves as commanding general for Fleet Marine Force, Atlantic, Marine Corps Forces, Europe, Marine Corps Forces, South, Marine Corps Forces, Strategic, and Marine Corps Installations East; while the latter serves as commander of Fleet Marine Force, Pacific, Marine Forces Central Command, and Marine Corps Installations West.

The Supporting Establishment includes Combat Development Command, Recruit Depots, Marine Corps Logistics Command, Marine Bases & Air Stations, Marine Corps Recruiting Command, and the United States Marine Band.

== Relationship with other uniformed services ==
Since the U.S. Marine Corps and the U.S. Army both believe that their combat capabilities overlap each other, they have both historically viewed the other branch as encroaching on their capabilities and have competed for money, missions, and fame. The Marines grew to a field strength of six divisions during World War II, including the 5th Marine Division and the 6th Marine Division. Both were disbanded after the war.

Most significantly, in the aftermath of World War II, Army efforts to restructure the American defense establishment involved the dissolution of the Marine Corps and the folding of its capabilities into the other services. Leading this movement were such prominent Army officers as General Dwight Eisenhower, who later became the president of the United States, and Army Chief of Staff George C. Marshall.

Both the chief of naval operations (CNO) and commandant of the Marine Corps (CMC), heads of their respective services, report directly to the secretary of the Navy (SECNAV). As a result, the Navy and Marine Corps have a close relationship, more so than with other branches of the United States Armed Forces. Recent whitepapers and promotional literature have commonly used the phrase "Navy-Marine Corps Team". This relationship stems from the Navy providing transport, logistical, medical, and religious service as well as combat support to put Marine units into the fight where they are needed. Conversely, Marines are responsible for conducting land operations to support naval campaigns, including the seizure of naval and air bases. All Marine Aviation programs except for specific command and control and air defense programs are funded by the Navy. Marine Corps officers are assigned to the Office of Chief of Naval Operations (OPNAV) Air Warfare Branch (N98) to represent Marine Aviation interests and serve as "action officers" (viz., staff members). By Congressional mandate, the OPNAV Director, Expeditionary Warfare Branch (N95) is filled by a Marine general.

The Marine Corps cooperates with the Navy on many institutional support services. The corps receives a significant portion of its officers from the United States Naval Academy and Naval Reserve Officer Training Corps (NROTC), which are partially staffed by Marines. Marine Corps drill instructors contribute to training naval officers in Officer Candidate School. Marine aviators are trained in the Naval Aviation training pipeline, and utilize naval-weapons and test-pilot schools. Currently, Navy aircraft carriers deploy with a Marine Hornet squadron alongside Navy squadrons. The Navy's Blue Angels flight team includes at least one Marine pilot and is supported by a Marine C-130 Hercules aircraft and crew.

Since the Marines do not train chaplains or medical personnel, officers and enlisted sailors from the Navy fill these roles. Some of these sailors, particularly Hospital Corpsmen, generally wear Marine uniforms emblazoned with the Marine insignia but US Navy name tags in order to be distinct to compatriots but indistinguishable to enemies. The Marines also operate a network security team in conjunction with the Navy. Marines and sailors share the vast majority of branch-specific awards, with Marines earning the Navy Cross, the highest honor awarded short of the Medal of Honor (which Marines also are awarded, in the Navy version of the Medal of Honor), and other like medals; while an example of the few Marine-only awards is the Good Conduct Medal.

== Marine Air-Ground Task Force (MAGTF) ==
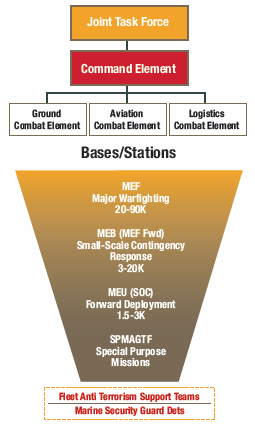
Basic structure of a Marine Air-Ground Task Force

Today, the basic framework for deployable Marine units is the Marine Air-Ground Task Force (MAGTF), a flexible structure that can vary in size. A MAGTF is composed of four elements: the command element (CE), the ground combat element (GCE), the aviation combat element (ACE) and the logistics combat element (LCE). A MAGTF can operate independently or as part of a larger coalition. It is a temporary organization formed for a specific mission and dissolved after completion of that mission.

The MAGTF structure reflects a strong tradition in the Corps towards self-sufficiency and a commitment to combined arms, both essential assets to an expeditionary force often called upon to act independently in discrete, time-sensitive situations. The history of the Marine Corps as well has led to a wariness towards relying too much on its sister services, and towards joint operations in general.

A MAGTF varies in size from the smallest, a Marine Expeditionary Unit (MEU), based around a reinforced infantry battalion and a composite squadron, up to the largest, a Marine Expeditionary Force (MEF), which ties together a Division, an Air Wing, and a Logistics Group under a MEF Headquarters Group.

The three Marine Expeditionary Forces are:

- I Marine Expeditionary Force located at Camp Pendleton, California
- II Marine Expeditionary Force located at Camp Lejeune, North Carolina
- III Marine Expeditionary Force located at Camp Courtney, Okinawa, Japan

=== Marine Expeditionary Unit (MEU) ===
Each of the seven MEUs are assigned to their respective Navy fleet as components of the Fleet Marine Force: three to the Atlantic Fleet (based at Camp Lejeune), and four to the Pacific Fleet (three based at Camp Pendleton and one in Okinawa). Each is commanded by a colonel with a combat arms background thus, infantry or aviator. The MEU components consist of a command element, ground combat element, aviation combat element, and a logistics combat element each commanded by a lieutenant colonel. MEU rotations are staggered so that while one MEU is on deployment, another is training to deploy, and one is standing down to refit and exchange units. Each MEU is trained during its workup evolution to perform special operations tasks and is then designated as an MEU(SOC) (Special Operations Capable). Each MEU can tailor its equipment to the expected tasking.

MEU Components:

- Command Element
- Aviation Combat Element (a composite squadron organized with a variety of platforms)
- Ground Combat Element (an infantry battalion, known as the "Battalion Landing Team", task-organized and reinforced with other organic elements such as armor, artillery, and engineers)
- Logistics Combat Element (provides the six functional areas of combat service support to the MEU)

Typically, a MEU falls under the operational control of but no longer deploys as part of an Expeditionary Strike Group (which replaced the Amphibious Ready Group), composed of Navy amphibious ("L-class") ships (a LHD or LHA to serve as the flagship of the Amphibious Squadron, LSD(s), and LPD(s) that embark the MEU), escort ships (such as the Arleigh Burke-class destroyer, Ticonderoga-class cruiser, and a Los Angeles-class submarine), and the requisite landing vehicles to transport the MEU ashore, such as the LCAC, LCU surface craft, Amphibious Assault Vehicle (though the MEU can utilize its helicopter lift assets embarked aboard the LHD or LHA). The theater component commander can use the Expeditionary Strike Group (ESG) in its entirety or detach units as needed, though the MEU usually remains aboard the ships of the ESG to use those as their principal base of operations. This ability to remain at sea and "over the horizon" until called is a unique capability of the ESG/MEU.

=== Ground Combat Elements (GCE) ===
The basic organization of Marine Corps infantry units follows the "rule of threes", which places three subordinates under a commander, not counting support elements. The organization and weapons are from the Marine Corps Table of Organization and Equipment (TOE) standard. Note that these are principles, but according to manpower and mission needs units can deviate from the TOE (e.g. with four subordinate units instead of three, or a commander who is a rank above or below the rank specified). Supporting units will have their own organization and equipment, but generally also follow the "rule of threes".

- A fire team, is the basic element of the GCE. It consists of four Marines:
  - 1x team leader, corporal (E-4) (M4/M16 with attached M203)
  - 1x rifleman, rank of Pvt/E-1 (M4/M16)
  - 1x assistant automatic rifleman, rank of PFC/E-2 (M4/M16)
  - 1x automatic rifleman, rank of LCpl/E-3 (M27 Infantry Automatic Rifle or M249 light machine gun).
- A rifle squad, usually led by a sergeant, is made up of three identical fire teams.
- A rifle platoon, commanded by a 2nd or 1st lieutenant, consists of three rifle squads, and a headquarters element made up the platoon commander, a platoon sergeant, a platoon guide, and a messenger. (One or more Navy Medical Corpsman are usually attached to the platoon from the battalion's medical platoon.) The platoon sergeant, usually a staff sergeant, advises the commander and serves as the second-in-command. The platoon guide, usually a sergeant, serves as the assistant platoon sergeant. A rifle platoon is capable of integrating attachments from the weapons platoon (e.g., assault squad or machine gun squad) and may include a two-man mortar forward observer team attached from the battalion's 81-mm mortar platoon.

A weapons platoon, usually commanded by a 1st lieutenant and assisted by a gunnery sergeant as the platoon sergeant, will substitute for the rifle squads:
- a 60 mm mortar section, with a staff sergeant as section leader and consisting of three mortar squads, with each squad led by a corporal as squad leader and containing one M224 mortar and three Marines.;
- an assault section, led by a sergeant as section leader and consisting of three assault squads, with each squad led by a corporal and containing two teams, with each team consisting of a SMAW and two Marines; and
- a medium machine gun section, led by a staff sergeant as section leader and consisting of three machine gun squads, with each squad led by a sergeant as squad leader and containing two teams, which each team led by a corporal as team leader and containing one M240G and three Marines).

- A rifle company, commanded by a captain as the commanding officer (CO) and assisted by a 1st lieutenant as the company executive officer (XO) who serves as second-in-command, consists of three rifle platoons, a weapons platoon, and a company headquarters, which, in addition to the two officers, includes the first sergeant, company gunnery sergeant, property NCO, and a messenger/driver.

A weapons company, commanded by a major and assisted by a captain as XO, will substitute for the rifle platoons an 81 mm mortar platoon, an anti-armor platoon, and a heavy machine gun platoon. In deference to the more extensive training requirements and complicated tactical considerations necessitated by the crew-served weapons employed by the weapons company, its platoon commanders are usually 1st lieutenants and the platoon sergeants are gunnery sergeants. The company headquarters includes a master sergeant as the operations chief (in lieu of the company gunnery sergeant) and an additional messenger/driver.
A headquarters and service company, commanded by a captain and assisted by a 2nd or 1st lieutenant as the XO, contains the battalion headquarters, which includes the command section (including the battalion CO, battalion XO, and the sergeant major), the executive staff sections (S-1, S-2, S-3, S-4, & S-6), and the chaplain section. The company consists of a company headquarters section, a scout sniper platoon, a communications platoon, a service platoon, and a medical platoon.

- An infantry battalion, commanded by a lieutenant colonel and assisted by a major as the battalion XO, consists of three rifle companies, a weapons company, and a headquarters and service company.
- An infantry regiment, commanded by a colonel and assisted by a lieutenant colonel as the regimental XO, consists of three battalions, and a regimental headquarters company.
- A Marine division, commanded by a major general as the commanding general (CG) and assisted by a brigadier general as the assistant division commander, usually consists of three infantry regiments, an artillery regiment, several separate battalions (i.e., reconnaissance, assault amphibian, tank, light armored reconnaissance, and combat engineer), and a headquarters battalion.

The unit designation brigade is only used in the Marine Corps in the form of a Marine Expeditionary Brigade (MEB), an intermediate sized Marine Air Ground Task Force (MAGTF). The MEB is usually commanded by a brigadier general as CG, who is assisted by a colonel as the chief of staff (CoS) of the MEB's general staff and who is "dual-hatted" as the MEB's second-in-command. The MEB consists of three regimental equivalent combat elements (ground, air, and logistics) and a battalion-sized headquarters element. The ground combat element (GCE) consists of a Regimental Combat Team (RCT), which is a heavily reinforced infantry regiment (including field artillery, infantry reconnaissance, amphibious assault vehicle, tank, light armored reconnaissance, and combat engineer units), itself roughly equivalent to a US Army Infantry Brigade Combat Team. The air, or aviation, combat element (ACE) consists of a composite Marine Aircraft Group containing several helicopter, tilt rotor, tactical fixed wing, and UAV squadrons and/or detachments, as well as aviation ground support, command and control, and air defense units. The MAG is roughly equivalent in terms of numbers of aircraft and personnel to a US Army Combat Aviation Brigade. The logistics combat element (LCE) consists of a combat logistics regiment (CLR) consisting of combat logistics battalions (CLB), and specialized logistical companies and detachments to support the MAGTF. The headquarters, or command, element (CE) consists of specialized companies and detachments that perform various command, control, communications, surveillance, reconnaissance, intelligence, law enforcement, and liaison functions.

Two unique unit designations to the Marine Corps are Marine Expeditionary Unit (MEU) and Marine Expeditionary Force (MEF) MAGTFs. The MEU is the smallest MAGTF and consists of approximately 2,200 personnel. Commanded by a colonel with a lieutenant colonel as XO, it consists of a battalion landing team (BLT), a reinforced infantry battalion, as its GCE and a Marine Medium Tiltrotor Squadron (VMM), reinforced with detachments of helicopters, tactical fixed wing, and UAV aircraft, as well as aviation ground support, command and control, and air defense detachments, as its ACE. The MEU's LCE consists of a CLB, and its CE is a company-sized version of the MEB's battalion-sized headquarters group. The MEF is the Marine Corps's equivalent tactical command level to an army corps. The MEF has a lieutenant general as CG with a major general as deputy CG. The MEF consists of a Marine Division as its GCE, a Marine Aircraft Wing as its ACE, a Marine Logistics Group as its LCE, and a regiment-sized MEF Headquarters Group (MEF HQG) as its CE.

Battalions, and larger units commanded by a field grade officer, have an executive officer as the second-in-command and an executive staff consisting of: Manpower / Administration & Personnel (S-1), Intelligence (S-2), Operations, Plans & Training (S-3), Logistics (S-4), Civil Affairs (wartime only) (S-5), and Communications (S-6) sections. Units commanded by a general officer have a chief of staff and a general staff in which the staff sections are designated as G-1, G-2, etc. Battalions and larger units replace the company (and battery) first sergeant with a sergeant major, as the senior enlisted advisor to the unit commander.

The four Marine divisions are:

- 1st Marine Division at Camp Pendleton, California
- 2nd Marine Division at Camp Lejeune, North Carolina
- 3rd Marine Division at Camp Courtney in Okinawa, Japan
- 4th Marine Division, a reserve unit headquartered in New Orleans, Louisiana, with units scattered throughout the United States.

In World War II, two more Marine Divisions were formed: the 5th and 6th, which fought in the Pacific War. These divisions were disbanded after the end of the war. The 5th Marine Division was reactivated for service in Vietnam but was disbanded again in the early 1970s.

=== Aviation combat element (ACE) ===
The mission of Marine Corps aviation is to provide the MAGTF commander with an aviation combat element (ACE) capable of conducting air operations in support of the seizure and defense of advanced naval bases, and conducting such land operations as may be directed by the Joint Force commander.

The ACE supports the MAGTF by providing the six functions of Marine aviation: assault support, anti-air warfare, offensive air support, electronic warfare, control of aircraft and missiles, and aerial reconnaissance.

Aviation units are organized into:

- Squadrons of 5–27 aircraft (depending upon aircraft type), tactically organized into sections of 2–3 aircraft and divisions of 2–3 sections, as needed for mission requirements (squadrons may also be organized with one or more detachments, containing two or more aircraft, for deployment requirements), commanded by a lieutenant colonel
- Groups of 4–12 squadrons (average of 7 squadrons per group) and a group headquarters, commanded by a colonel
- Wings of two or more Marine aircraft groups (MAG), a Marine air control group, and Marine wing headquarters squadron, and a Marine wing headquarters, commanded by a major general as the wing CG with a brigadier general as the assistant wing commander.

The four Marine aircraft wings are:

- 1st Marine Aircraft Wing at Marine Corps Base Camp Smedley D. Butler, Okinawa, Japan
- 2nd Marine Aircraft Wing at Marine Corps Air Station Cherry Point, North Carolina
- 3rd Marine Aircraft Wing at Marine Corps Air Station Miramar, California
- 4th Marine Aircraft Wing, a reserve unit, headquartered in New Orleans, Louisiana, with units scattered throughout the United States

=== Logistics Combat Element (LCE) ===
Beyond logistics (i.e., motor transport, supply, and maintenance), the LCE provides engineer support (i.e., heavy equipment, bulk fuel and water, utilities, bridging, explosive ordnance disposal, and reinforcement to combat engineer units), medical and dental personnel, and other specialized units (e.g., aerial delivery and landing support).

The four Marine logistics groups are:

- 1st Marine Logistics Group at Camp Pendleton, California
- 2nd Marine Logistics Group at Camp Lejeune, North Carolina
- 3rd Marine Logistics Group at Camp Kinser, Okinawa, Japan
- 4th Marine Logistics Group, a reserve unit, headquartered in New Orleans, Louisiana, with units scattered throughout the United States.

== Marine Corps Special Operations Components ==
Although the notion of a Marine special warfare contribution to the U.S. Special Operations Command (USSOCOM) was considered as early as the founding of USSOCOM in the 1980s, it was resisted by the Marine Corps. Then Commandant Paul X. Kelley expressed the popular belief that Marines should support Marines, and that the Corps should not fund a special warfare capability that would not support Marine operations.

However, resistance from within the Marine Corps dissipated when Marine leaders watched the Corps' "crown jewels"—the 15th and 26th MEU (Special Operations Capable) {MEU(SOC)s}—sit on the sidelines during the early stages of Operation Enduring Freedom while other special warfare units led the way. After a three-year development period, the Marine Corps agreed in 2006 to supply a 2,700-strong unit, Marine Forces Special Operations Command (MARSOC), which would answer directly to USSOCOM.

=== Marine Special Operations Command ===

The Marine Special Operations Command is the Marine Corps's special operations component that reports to United States Special Operations Command (USSOCOM). Currently, MARSOC trains, organizes, equips and, when directed by the Commander, USSOCOM, deploys task organized, scalable, and responsive U.S. Marine Corps special operations forces worldwide in support of combatant commanders and other agencies.

The MSOAG, formerly the FMTU, has been operating since 2005, before MARSOC formally existed. MARSOC was formally activated during a February 24 ceremony at Camp Lejeune, N.C., where MARSOC is now headquartered. Fox Company, 2nd Marine Special Operations Battalion, was the first of the Marine Special Operations Battalions' companies to activate in the Spring of 2006. Drawing its manpower from the core of 2nd Force Reconnaissance Co., Fox Company's creation came at the expense of 2nd Force Reconnaissance Co., which stood down upon the transfer of its platoons to both MARSOC's 2nd Marine Special Operations Battalion, and a new company (Delta) of 2nd Reconnaissance Battalion.

- A fireteam is the basic element of the Marine Special Operations Regiment. Like fireteams in the infantry, MSOR fireteams consist of four Marines; a team leader/grenadier, an automatic rifleman, an assistant automatic rifleman and a rifleman.
- A Marine Special Operations Team (MSOT) is made up of three fireteams, in addition to a captain as a team leader, a radio operator and a Navy corpsman.
- A Marine Special Operations Company (MSOC), made up of four MSOTs and commanded by a major.
- A Marine Special Operations Battalion, made up of four MSOCs and commanded by a lieutenant colonel.

The three Marine Special Operations Battalions (MSOBs) are:

- 1st Marine Special Operations Battalion at Camp Pendleton, California.
- 2nd Marine Special Operations Battalion at Camp Lejeune, North Carolina.
- 3rd Marine Special Operations Battalion at Camp Lejeune, North Carolina.

MARSOC also contains a Marine Special Operations Support Group (SOSG) that trains, equips, structures, and provides specially qualified Marine forces, including operational logistics, intelligence, multipurpose canines, Firepower Control Teams and communications support in order to sustain worldwide special operations missions as directed by Commander, U.S. Marine Corps Forces Special Operations Command (COMMARFORSOC).

== See also ==
- List of United States Marine Corps Marine expeditionary forces
  - List of United States Marine Corps divisions
    - List of United States Marine Corps regiments
      - List of United States Marine Corps battalions
  - List of United States Marine Corps aircraft wings
    - List of United States Marine Corps aircraft groups
      - List of active United States Marine Corps aircraft squadrons
      - List of inactive United States Marine Corps aircraft squadrons
      - List of United States Marine Corps aviation support units
- List of United States Marine Corps logistics groups
- List of United States Marine Corps brigades
- List of Marine Expeditionary Units
- Headquarters Marine Corps
- Marine Corps Intelligence Command
