= List of current organizational constructs of the United States Marine Corps =

Organizational constructs of the United States Marine Corps

The following is a list of constructs through which the United States Marine Corps is currently organized.:

- Battalion
- Brigade
- Commands
- Companies
- Division
- Fireteam
- Fleet Marine Force (equivalent to a region)
- Groups
- Marine expeditionary force (equivalent to a corps)
- Marine expeditionary unit
  - Maritime Special Purpose Force
- Platoon
- Regiment
- Squad
- Squadrons
- Wings

== See also ==
- Marine air–ground task force
- Special Purpose Marine Air-Ground Task Force
  - Special Purpose Marine Air-Ground Task Force – Crisis Response – Africa
  - Special Purpose Marine Air-Ground Task Force – Crisis Response – Central Command
- List of current formations of the United States Army
