= Commanding officer =

Officer in command of a military unit

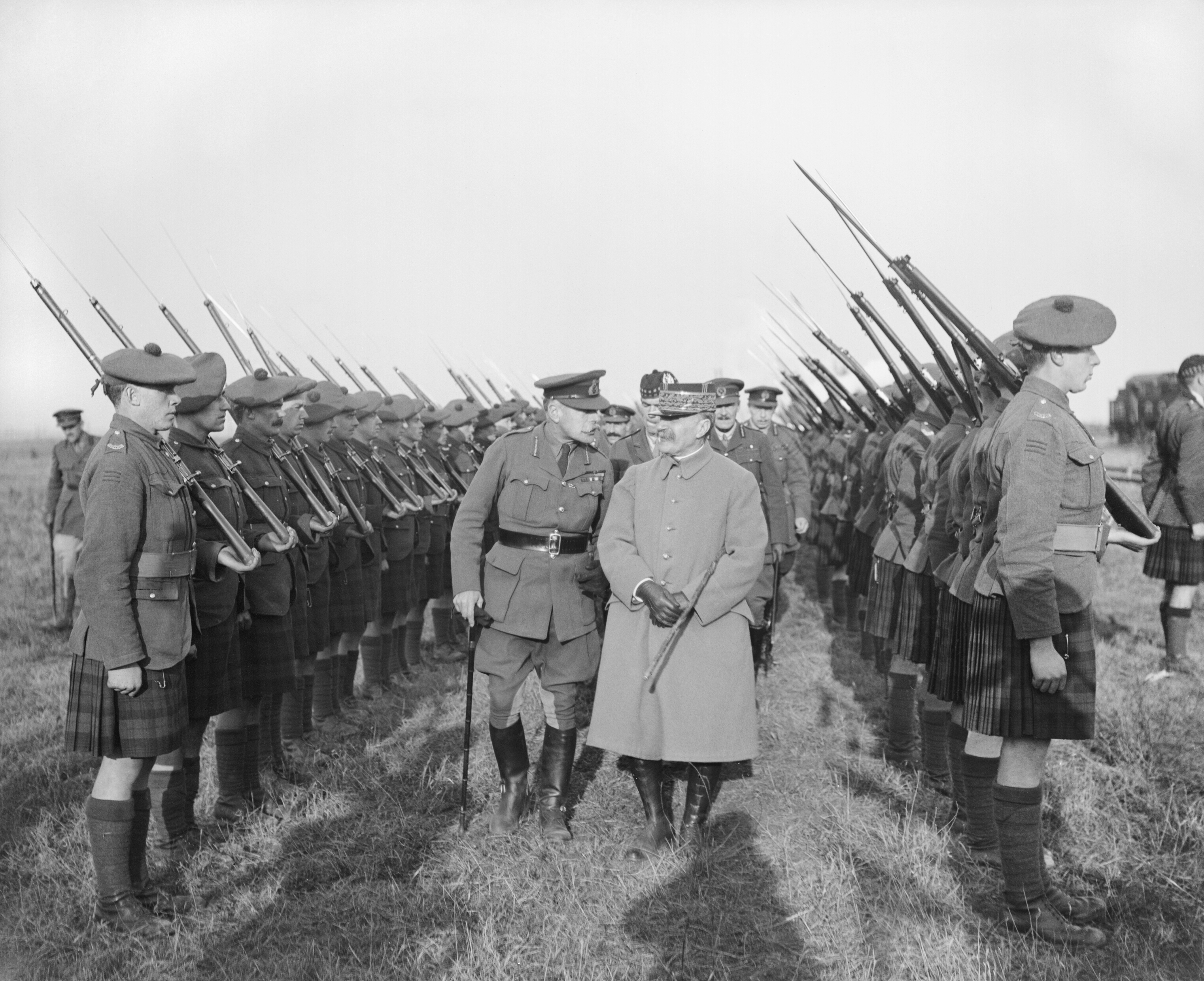
Douglas Haig and Ferdinand Foch inspecting the Gordon Highlanders, 1918

The commanding officer (CO) or commander, or sometimes, if the incumbent is a general officer, commanding general (CG), is the officer in command of a military unit. The commanding officer has ultimate authority over the unit, and is usually given wide latitude to run the unit as they see fit, within the bounds of military law. In this respect, commanding officers have significant responsibilities (for example, the use of force, finances, equipment, the Geneva Conventions), duties (to higher authority, mission effectiveness, duty of care to personnel), and powers (for example, discipline and punishment of personnel within certain limits of military law).

In some countries, commanding officers may be of any commissioned rank, although in others the term only refers to officers in command of units of specific sizes. Usually, there are more officers than command positions available, and time spent in command is generally a key aspect of promotion, so the role of commanding officer is highly valued. The commanding officer heads the command team within the modern military hierarchy.

There are two recurring debates related to military command: the collective command thesis and civil-military relations.

While the commander is an individual, the academic debate centres on whether command is an individual act or a form of a collective. British sociologist Anthony King argued for the emergence of a command collective in Western military forces in his 2019 book Command. Others have argued against King's thesis, stating that it romanticises the collective, that contemporary commanders themselves do not understand their function in this way, or that it may be the case. Still, collective forms of command are less effective in actual combat. U.S. Marine Corps General James Mattis also disagreed with King's thesis: "I disagree if you are trying to do decision-making in boards. The enemy will dance around you".

The civil-military control debate centres on a paradox. The military, an institution designed to protect the polity, must also be strong enough to threaten the society it serves. A military takeover or coup is an example where this balance is used to change the government. Ultimately, the military must accept that it may have to implement a policy decision with which it disagrees.

== Commonwealth ==
=== Army and Royal Marines ===
In the British Army, Royal Marines, and many other Commonwealth military and paramilitary organisations, the commanding officer of a unit is appointed. Thus the office of CO is an appointment. The appointment of commanding officer is exclusive to commanders of major units (regiments, battalions and similar sized units). It is customary for a commanding officer to hold the rank of lieutenant colonel, and they are usually referred to within the unit simply as "the colonel" or the CO. "The colonel" may also refer to the holder of an honorary appointment of a senior officer who oversees the non-operational affairs of a regiment. However, the rank of the appointment holder and the holder's appointment are separate. That is, not all lieutenant colonels are COs, and although most COs are lieutenant colonels, that is not a requirement of the appointment.

Sub-units and minor units (companies, squadrons and batteries) and formations (brigades, divisions, corps and armies) do not have a commanding officer. The officer in command of a minor unit holds the appointment of officer commanding (OC). Higher formations have a commander (e.g. brigade commander) or a general officer commanding (GOC). Area commands have a commander-in-chief (e.g. C-in-C Land Army, C-in-C British Army of the Rhine). The OC of a sub-unit or minor unit is today customarily a major (although formerly usually a captain in infantry companies and often also in cavalry squadrons), although again the rank of the appointment holder and the holder's appointment are separate and independent of each other.

In some cases, independent units smaller than a sub-unit (e.g. a military police platoon that reports directly to a formation such as a brigade) will also have an OC appointed. In these cases, the officer commanding can be a captain or even a lieutenant. The commanders of administrative organisations, such as schools or wings, may also be designated officers commanding or commanders.

Appointments such as CO and OC may have specific powers associated with them. For example, they may have statutory powers to promote soldiers or to deal with certain disciplinary offences and award certain punishments. The CO of a unit may have the power to sentence an offender to 28 days' detention, whereas the OC of a sub-unit may have the power to sentence an offender to three days' restriction of privileges.

Commanders of units smaller than sub-units (e.g. platoons, troops and sections) are not specific appointments and officers or NCOs who fill those positions are simply referred to as the commander or leader (e.g. platoon commander, troop leader, section commander/leader, etc.).

=== Air force ===
In the Royal Air Force, the title of commanding officer is reserved for station commanders or commanders of independent units, including flying squadrons. As with the British Army, the post of a commander of a lesser unit such as an administrative wing, squadron or flight is referred to as the officer commanding (OC).

=== Navy ===
In the Royal Navy and many others, commanding officer is the official title of the commander of any ship, unit or installation. However, they are referred to as "the captain" no matter what their actual rank, or informally as "skipper" or even "boss".

== United States ==
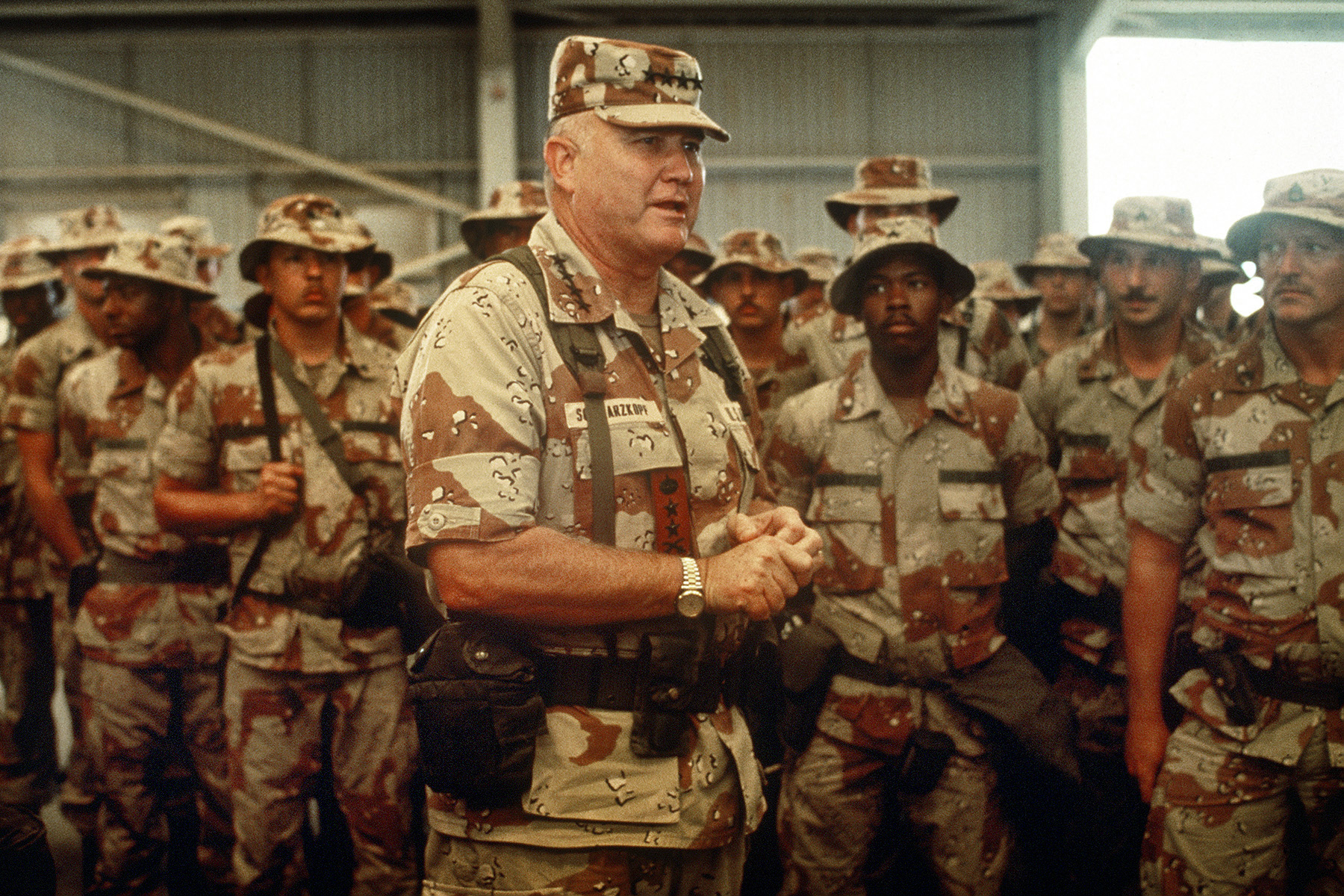
General Norman Schwarzkopf Jr. speaks with American troops during the Gulf War.

In the United States, the status of commanding officer is duly applied to all commissioned officers who hold lawful command over a military unit, ship, or installation.

=== Army ===
The commanding officer of a company, usually a captain, is referred to as the company commander (or the battery/troop commander for artillery/cavalry) units. The commanding officer of a battalion (or squadron of cavalry/armored cavalry) is usually a lieutenant colonel. The commanding officer of a brigade, a colonel, is the brigade commander. At the division level and higher, however, the commanding officer is referred to as the commanding general, as these officers hold general officer rank.

Warrant officers in the United States Armed Forces are single career-track officers that can, and occasionally do, hold command positions within certain specialty units, i.e. Special Forces and Army Aviation. However, warrant officers usually do not command if a commissioned officer is present; normally they serve as executive officer (2IC).

=== Marine Corps ===
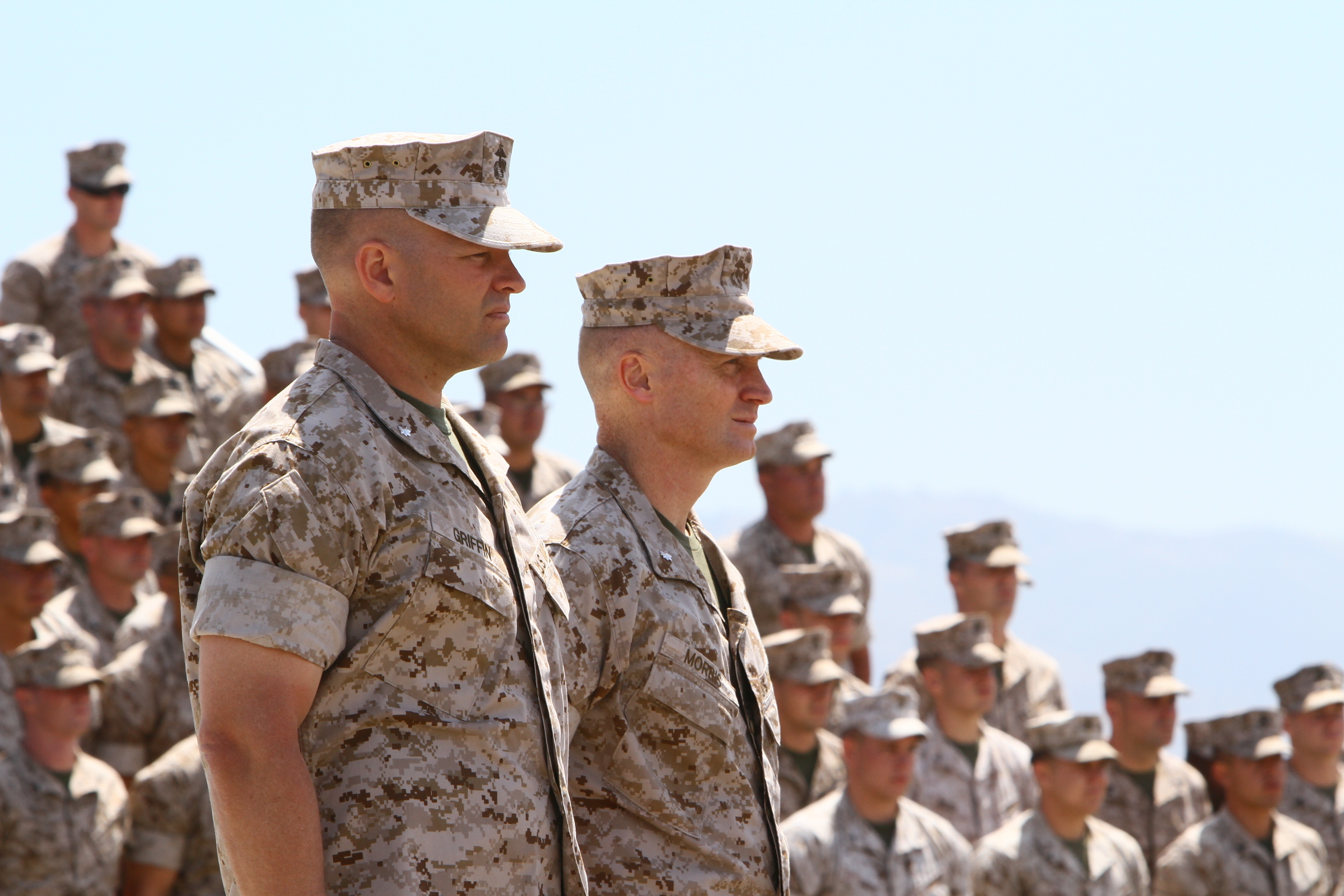
Dark Horse Battalion welcomes new commanding officer

The commanding officer of a company, usually a captain, is referred to as the company commander or the battery commander (for field artillery and low altitude air defense units). The commanding officer of a battalion or a squadron (Marine aviation), is usually a lieutenant colonel. The commanding officer of a regiment, aviation group, or Marine Expeditionary Unit (MEU) is a colonel. At the Marine Expeditionary Brigade (MEB), Marine Logistics Group (MLG), Marine Division (MARDIV), Marine Aircraft Wing (MAW), Marine Expeditionary Force (MEF), and Fleet Marine Force (FMF) levels; however, the commanding officer is referred to as the commanding general, as these officers hold general officer rank.

=== Navy and Coast Guard ===
In the United States Navy and United States Coast Guard, commanding officer is the official title of the commander of a ship, but they are usually referred to as "the Captain" regardless of their actual rank: "Any naval officer who commands a ship, submarine or other vessel is addressed by naval custom as 'captain' while aboard in command, regardless of their actual rank." They may be informally referred to as "Skipper", though allowing or forbidding the use of this form of address is the commanding officer's prerogative.

A prospective commanding officer (PCO) is a U.S. Navy officer who has been selected for his/her own command. The term is used in correspondence or in reference to the officer before they assume command of the unit (ship, squadron, unit, etc.).

If the sailor in command of a unit is an enlisted member, rather than a commissioned or warrant officer, he or she is referred to as the "officer in charge" rather than "commanding officer". In the Coast Guard it is common for smaller cutters to be commanded by a chief petty officer.

=== Air Force ===
In the United States Air Force, the commanding officer of a unit is similarly referred to as the unit commander, such as squadron commander, group commander, wing commander, and so forth. Squadron commanders (the base unit of the United States Air Force) are usually majors or lieutenant colonels. Group commanders (made up of two or more squadrons) are usually colonels, while wing commanders may be colonels (typical wings) or brigadier generals (larger wings).

== See also ==
- Command and control
- Staff (military)
