= Carlton W. Fulford Jr. =

United States Marine Corps general

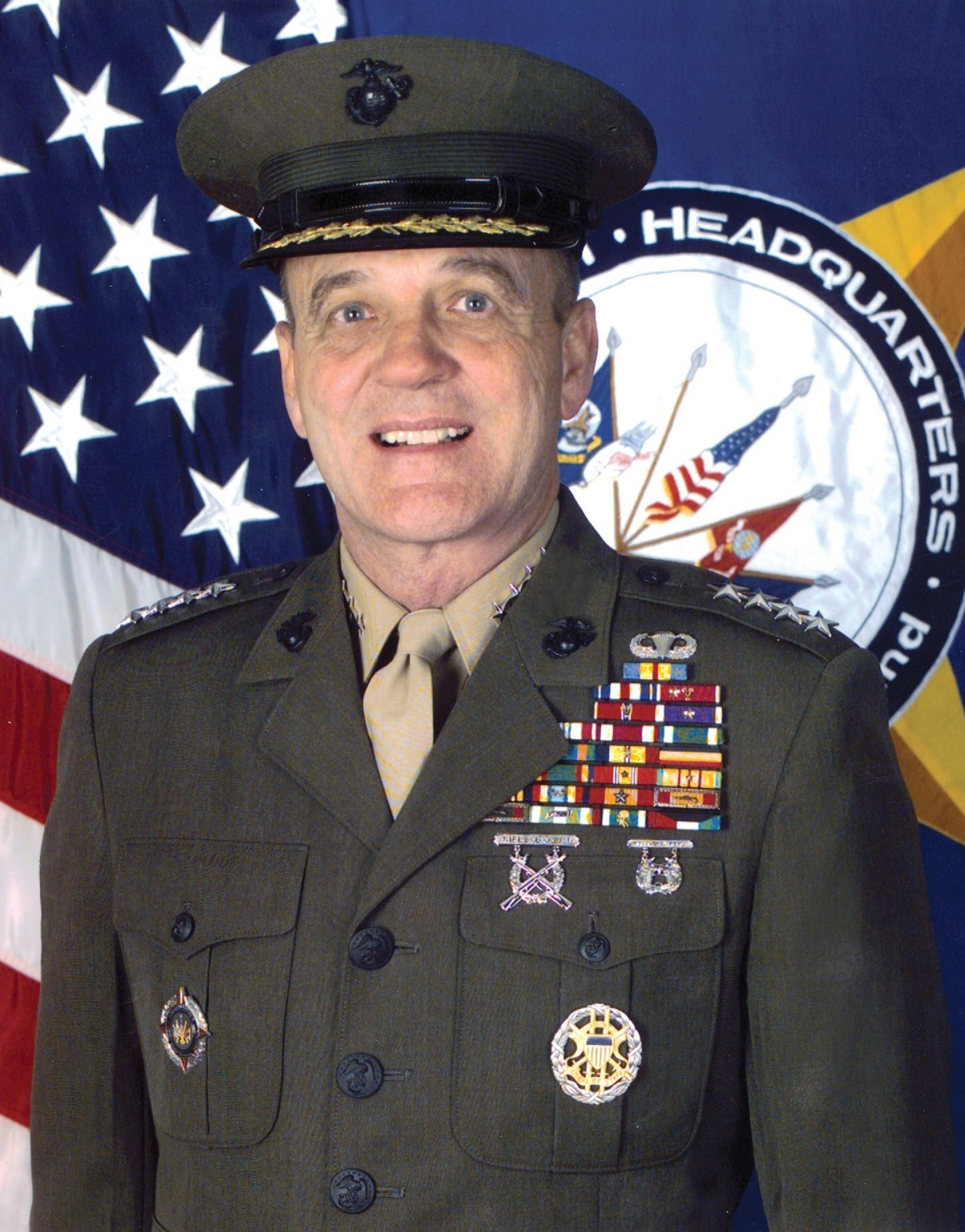
- General Carlton W. Fulford Jr.
- Born: May 11, 1944 (age 82); Newnan, Georgia, U.S.
- Relatives: Lieutenant General Robert C. Fulford (son)
- Military career
- Allegiance: United States of America
- Branch: United States Marine Corps
- Service years: 1966-2002
- Rank: General
- Commands: 1st Battalion; 7th Marines; 4th Marine Expeditionary Brigade; III MEF; Marine Corps Bases, Japan; I MEF; FMF, Pacific
- Conflicts: Vietnam War; Gulf War
- Awards: Defense Distinguished Service Medal (4); Silver Star; Legion of Merit (2); Bronze Star with "V"; Purple Heart (2)
- Other work: Africa Center for Strategic Studies, Director; Jamestown Foundation, Director

Carlton W. Fulford Jr. (born May 11, 1944) is a retired United States Marine Corps four-star general who served as Deputy Commander in Chief, United States European Command (DCINCEUR) from 2000 to 2002.

== Biography ==
Carlton Fulford Jr. was born on May 11, 1944, in Newnan, Georgia.

Fulford graduated from the United States Naval Academy in June 1966 and following graduation received his commission as a second lieutenant in the United States Marine Corps. Following completion of The Basic School, Marine Corps Base Quantico, and the Vietnamese Language School, he was assigned as a platoon commander with Company D, 1st Battalion, 5th Marines in the Republic of Vietnam. He was promoted to first lieutenant in October 1967, and subsequently reassigned as Commanding Officer, Company F, 2nd Battalion, 5th Marines until his return from Vietnam in June 1968.

His other Fleet Marine Force assignments include: Commanding Officer, Company E, 2nd Battalion, 4th Marines (1971–1972); Executive Officer, 3rd Battalion, 8th Marines (1979–1980); G-3 Training Officer for the 2nd Marine Division (1980–1981); Commanding Officer, 1st Battalion, 8th Marines (1981–1982); Assistant Chief of Staff G-3 for the 1st Marine Expeditionary Brigade (1987–1989); Commanding Officer, 7th Marines (1989–1991); Commanding Officer, Regimental Combat Team 7 (Task Force Ripper) during Operation Desert Shield and Desert Storm; Commanding General, 4th Marine Expeditionary Brigade (1991–1992), Commanding General, III Marine Expeditionary Force (1994–1995), and Commanding General, I Marine Expeditionary Force (1996–1998); Commander, U.S. Marine Corps Forces Pacific /Commanding General, Fleet Marine Force, Pacific/Commander, U.S. Marine Corps Bases, Pacific headquartered at Camp H. M. Smith, Hawaii (1998–1999).

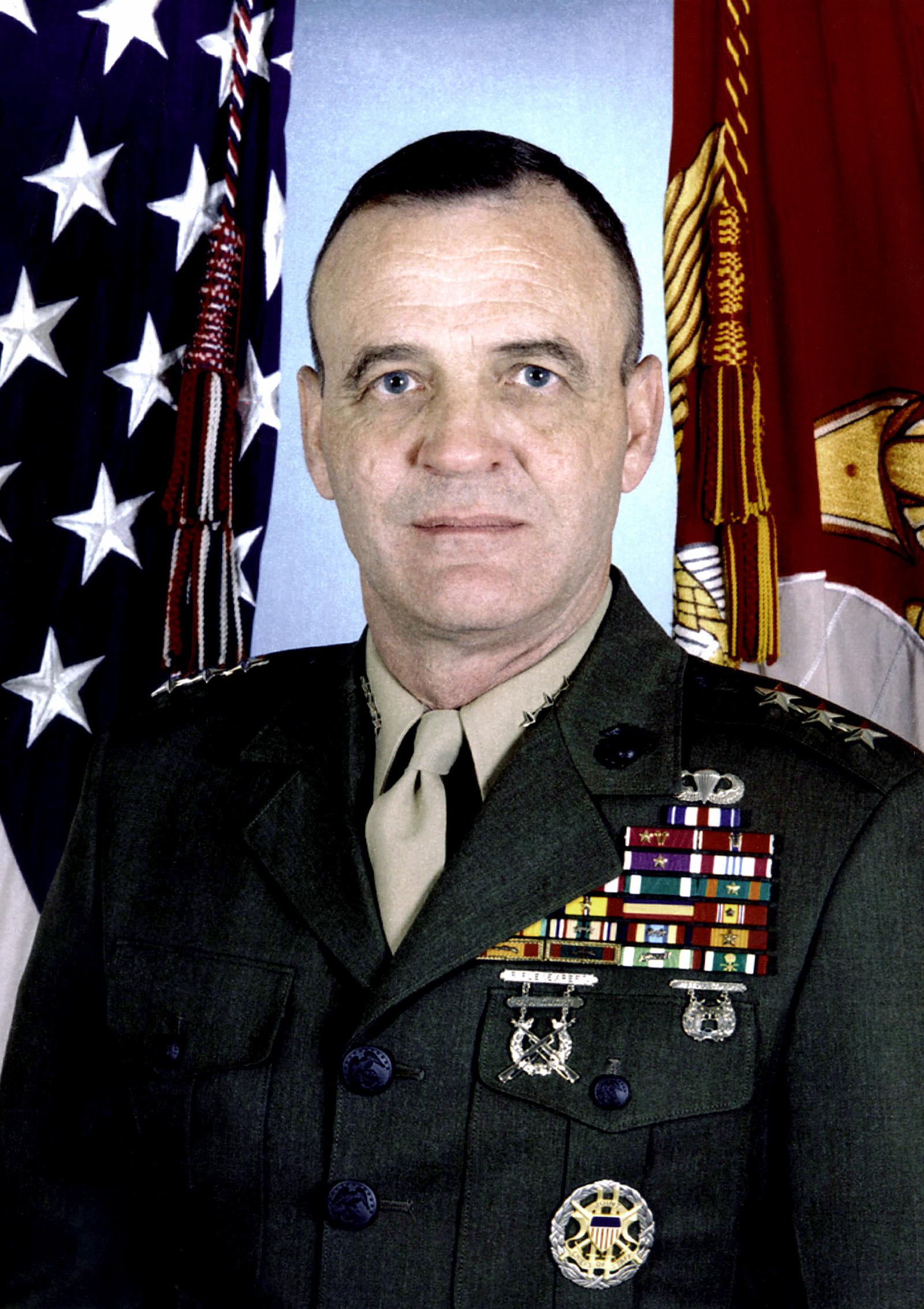
LtGen Carlton Fulford in 1997

His non-FMF assignments include: Company Commander, Naval Academy Preparatory School (1968–1969); Management Engineer, Marine Corps Air Station Yuma, Arizona (1973–1976); Economics Instructor, U.S. Naval Academy (1977–1978); Branch Head, Training Department, HQMC (1982–1984); Strategy Planner, Forces and Strategy Branch, United States Pacific Command (1985–1987); Commanding General, Landing Force Training Command, Atlantic (1991–1992); Director, Training and Education Division, Marine Corps Combat Development Command (1992–1994); Commanding General Marine Corps Bases, Japan (1994–1995); Vice Director, The Joint Staff (1995–1996); Director, The Joint Staff (1999–2000); and Deputy Commander in Chief, United States European Command (2000–2002).

In addition to The Basic School, Fulford graduated from the Infantry Officers Advanced Course; Command and Staff College; and the Industrial College of the Armed Forces. Fulford also earned a Master of Science degree from Rensselaer Polytechnic Institute (1973).

== Awards and decorations ==
His personal decorations include:

Basic Parachutist Insignia
1st Row		Defense Distinguished Service Medal w/ 1 oak leaf cluster		
2nd Row	Legion of Merit w/ 1 award star & valor device	Silver Star	Bronze Star w/ valor device	Purple Heart w/ 1 award star
3rd Row	Defense Meritorious Service Medal	Meritorious Service Medal	Navy and Marine Corps Achievement Medal w/ 1 award star	Navy and Marine Corps Commendation Medal
4th Row	Combat Action Ribbon w/ 1 award star	Navy Presidential Unit Citation	Navy Unit Commendation	National Defense Service Medal w/ 2 service stars
5th Row	Vietnam Service Medal	Navy Sea Service Deployment Ribbon w/ 2 service stars	Vietnam Gallantry Cross w/ palm	Vietnam Gallantry Cross unit citation
6th Row	Vietnam Civil Actions unit citation	Vietnam Campaign Medal	Kuwait Liberation Medal (Saudi Arabia)	Kuwait Liberation Medal (Kuwait)
Office of the Joint Chiefs of Staff Identification Badge

== See also ==
- List of United States Marine Corps four-star generals
