= Marine Expeditionary Force =

Largest type of a Marine air–ground task force in the United States Marine Corps

A Marine Expeditionary Force (MEF), formerly known as a Marine amphibious force, is the largest type of a Marine Air–Ground Task Force. A MEF is the principal building block of United States Marine Corps combat power.

NATO Map Symbol

== Structure ==
A MEF is larger than a Marine Expeditionary Unit (MEU) or Marine Expeditionary Brigade (MEB).

Each MEF consists of a MEF Information Group (MIG) as the command element, a Marine division (MARDIV) as the Ground Combat Element (GCE), a Marine Aircraft Wing (MAW) as the Aviation Combat Element, and a Marine Logistics Group (MLG) as the Logistics Combat Element.

The MEF also contains a Special Operations Training Group (SOTG) and is the training section component for the MEU and MEB. The SOTG oversees the training and evaluation exercises for the MEU's annual Special Operations Capable Certification.

=== MEF Information Group (MIG) ===
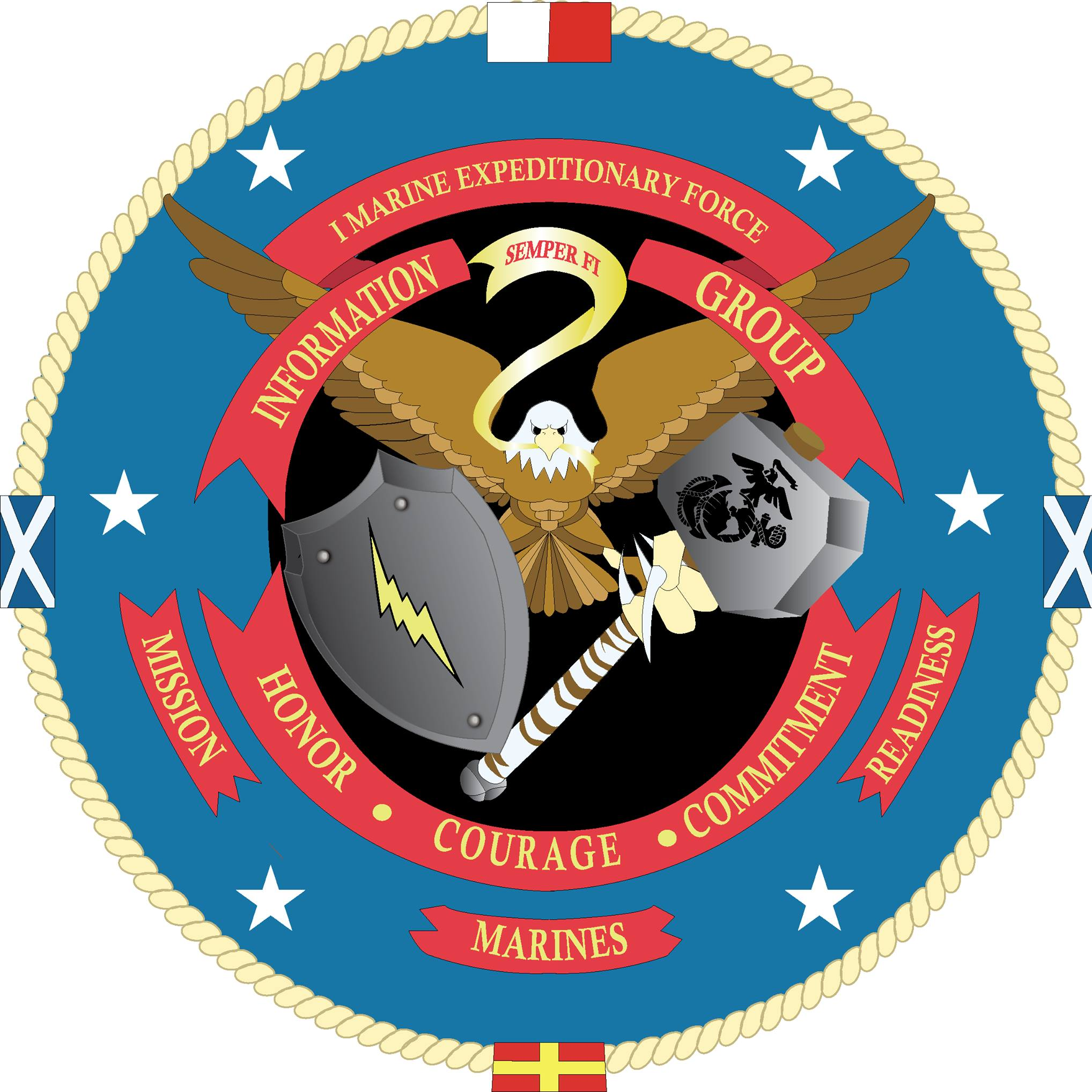
I MEF Information Group unit logo

The MEF Headquarters Groups (MHG) were redesignated MEF Information Groups in 2017.

The motto for USMC MIG’s is “Collect. Protect. Project.” MIG’s coordinate, integrate and employ capabilities for information environment operations in order to ensure the Marine Air Ground Task Force (MAGTF) Commander’s ability to facilitate friendly forces maneuver and deny the enemy freedom of action in the information environment. MIG’s also provide communications, intelligence, and supporting arms liaison in support of MAGTF operations.

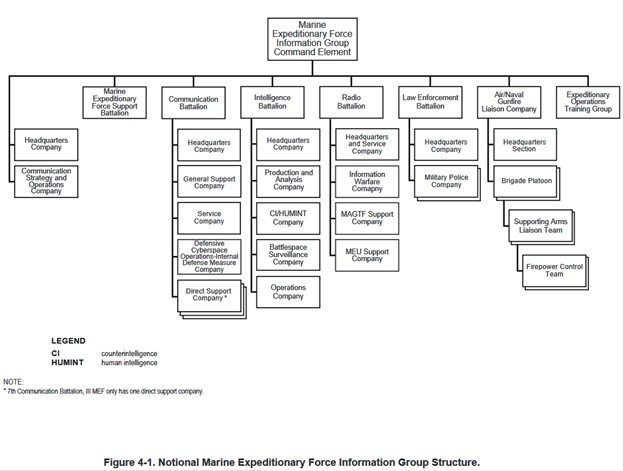
MEF Information Group (MIG)

- I MEF Information Group (I MIG), Camp Pendleton, CA
- II MEF Information Group (II MIG), Camp Lejeune, NC
- III MEF Information Group (III MIG), Camp Hansen, Okinawa, Japan

Organizational information on the MIG's and their subordinate units is available in MCRP 1-10.1, “Organization of the United States Marine Corps,” (As Amended Through 23 July 2020). A new Marine Corps Reference Publication (MCRP 3-30.8) covering “Marine Expeditionary Force Information Group Operations” was published in November 2024.

In September 2026 the Marine Corps announced the activation of one Robotics and Autonomous Systems (RAS) Company within each MEF as part of the MIG to meet sensing demands of MAGTF units.

== List of MEFs ==
A MEF also commands several smaller MAGTFs, including MEBs and MEUs.

==== I Marine Expeditionary Force ====
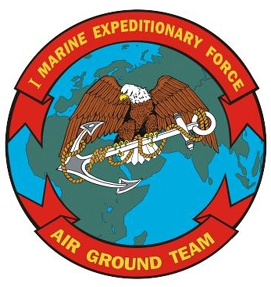
Camp Pendleton, California

Insignia	Name	Location
	1st Marine Division	Camp Pendleton, California
	3rd Marine Aircraft Wing	Marine Corps Air Station Miramar, California
	1st Marine Logistics Group	Camp Pendleton, California
	1st Marine Expeditionary Brigade	Camp Pendleton, California
	11th Marine Expeditionary Unit	Camp Pendleton, California
	13th Marine Expeditionary Unit	Camp Pendleton, California
	15th Marine Expeditionary Unit	Camp Pendleton, California

==== II Marine Expeditionary Force ====
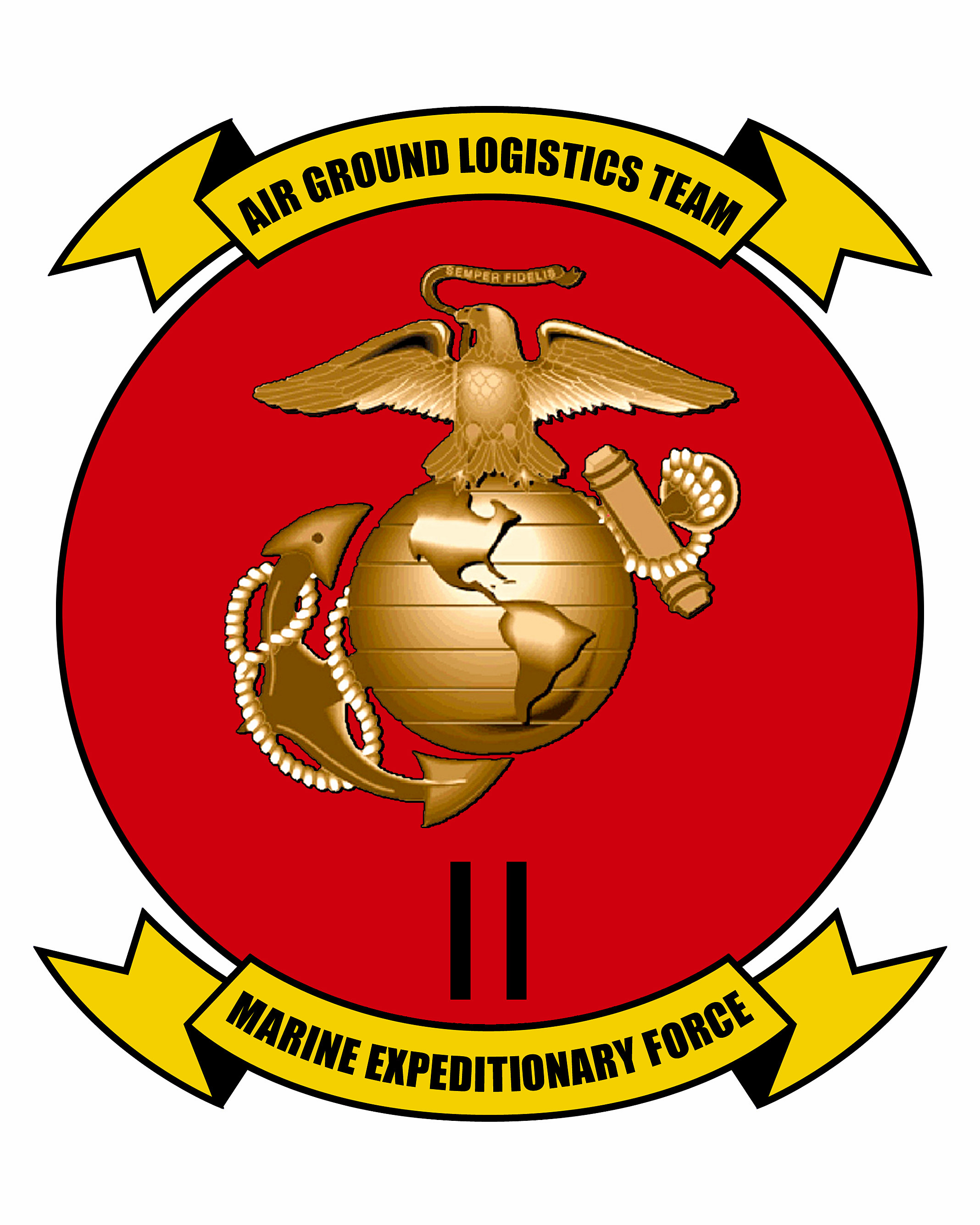
Camp Lejeune, North Carolina

Insignia	Name	Location
	2nd Marine Division	Camp Lejeune, North Carolina
	2nd Marine Aircraft Wing	Marine Corps Air Station Cherry Point, North Carolina
	2nd Marine Logistics Group	Camp Lejeune, North Carolina
	2nd Marine Expeditionary Brigade	Camp Lejeune, North Carolina
	22nd Marine Expeditionary Unit	Camp Lejeune, North Carolina
	24th Marine Expeditionary Unit	Camp Lejeune, North Carolina
	26th Marine Expeditionary Unit	Camp Lejeune, North Carolina

==== III Marine Expeditionary Force ====
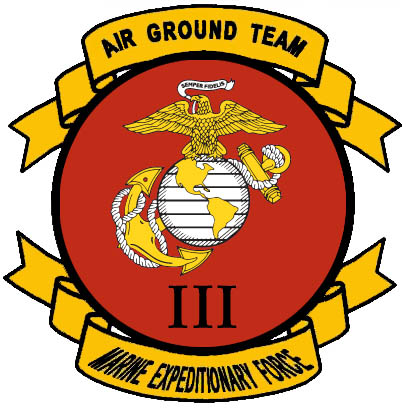
Camp Butler, Okinawa, Japan

Insignia	Name	Location
	3rd Marine Division	Camp Courtney, Okinawa
	1st Marine Aircraft Wing	Camp Foster, Okinawa
	3rd Marine Logistics Group	Camp Kinser, Okinawa
	3rd Marine Expeditionary Brigade	Camp Butler, Okinawa
	31st Marine Expeditionary Unit	Camp Hansen, Okinawa

==== V Marine Expeditionary Force ====
V MEF was established on 15 January 1991 to assume missions and tasks assigned to I MEF prior to its deployment to the Middle Easy. (pages 234, 237) It was to form, train, and deploy units to reinforce and replace those employed in the Persian Gulf area. On 24 April 1991 I MEF was welcomed home in ceremonies at Camp Pendleton. At the same time, V MEF was deactivated.

==== Marine Forces Reserve ====
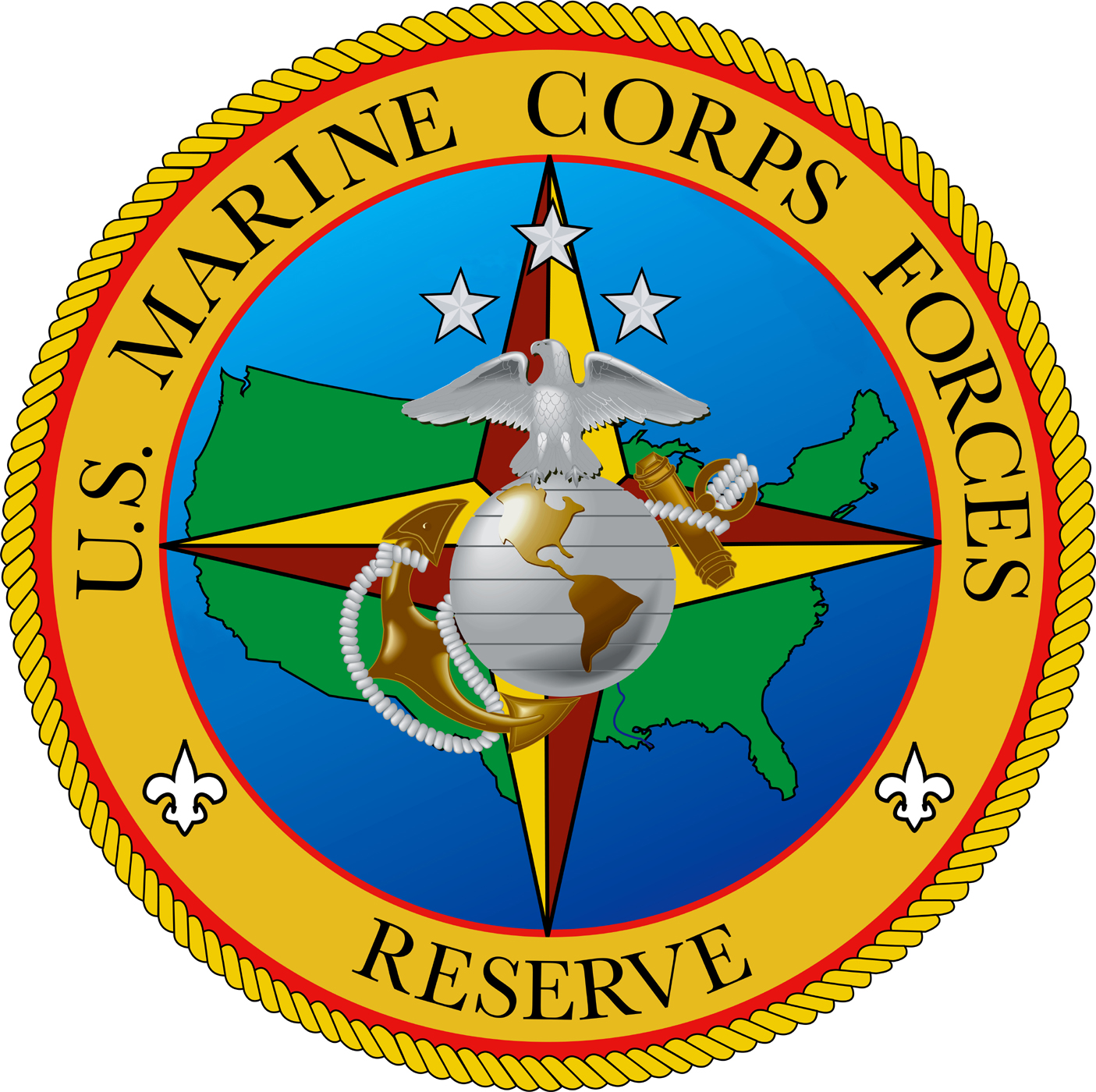
New Orleans, Louisiana

Insignia	Name	Location
	4th Marine Division	New Orleans, Louisiana
	4th Marine Aircraft Wing	New Orleans, Louisiana
	4th Marine Logistics Group	New Orleans, Louisiana
