= Marine Air–Ground Task Force =

US Marine Corps combined arms force

In the United States Marine Corps, a Marine Air–Ground Task Force (MAGTF, pronounced MAG-TAF) is the principal organization for all missions across the range of military operations. MAGTFs are a balanced air–ground, combined arms task organization of Marine Corps forces under a single commander that is structured to accomplish a specific mission. The MAGTF was formalized by the publishing of Marine Corps Order 3120.3 in December 1963, "The Marine Corps in the National Defense, MCDP 1-0". It stated:

A Marine Air–Ground Task Force with separate air ground headquarters is normally formed for combat operations and training exercises in which substantial combat forces of both Marine aviation and Marine ground units are included in the task organization of participating Marine forces.

Since World War II, in many crises the United States Marine Corps has deployed projection forces, with the ability to move ashore with sufficient sustainability for prolonged operations. MAGTFs have long provided the United States with a broad spectrum of response options when U.S. and allied interests have been threatened and in non-combat situations which require critical response. Selective, timely and credible commitment of air–ground units has, on many occasions, helped bring stability to a region and sent signals worldwide that the United States is willing to defend its interests, and is able to do so with a powerful force on short notice.

NATO Map Symbol

== Composition ==
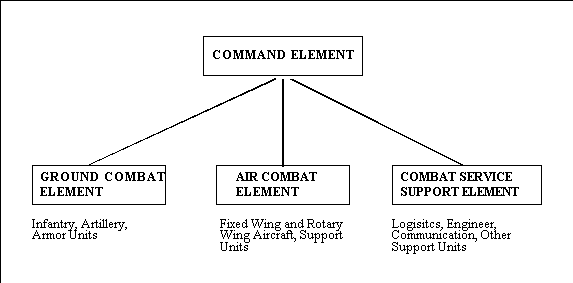

The four core elements of a Marine Air–Ground Task Force are:

- The Command Element (CE), a headquarters unit organized into a MAGTF (MEU, MEB, MEF) headquarters (HQ) group, that exercises command and control (management and planning for manpower, intelligence, operations and training, and logistics functions) over the other elements of the MAGTF. The HQ group consists of communications, intelligence, surveillance, and law enforcement (i.e., military police) detachments, companies, and battalions, and reconnaissance (Force Reconnaissance), and liaison (ANGLICO) platoons, detachments, and companies.
- The Ground Combat Element (GCE), composed primarily of infantry units (infantry battalions organized into battalion landing teams, regimental combat teams, and Marine divisions). These organizations contain a headquarters unit that provides command and control (management and planning for manpower, intelligence, operations and training, and logistics functions) as well as scout/sniper, aviation liaison/forward air controller, NBC defense, communications, service (supply, motor transport, weapons maintenance, and dining facility), and Navy combat medical and chaplain's corps personnel. The GCE also contains combat support units, including artillery, armor (tank, assault amphibian, and light armored reconnaissance), combat engineer (including EOD), and reconnaissance units. At the division level, the GCE also contains limited organic combat service support, including a truck company, a military police/law enforcement company, and the division band.
- The Aviation Combat Element (ACE), which contributes the air power to the MAGTF includes all aircraft (fixed wing, helicopters, tiltrotor, and UAV) and aviation support units. The units are organized into detachments, squadrons, groups, and wings, except for low altitude air defense units, which are organized into platoons, detachments, batteries, and battalions. These units include pilots, flight officers, enlisted aircrewmen, aviation logistics (aircraft maintenance, aviation electronics, aviation ordnance, and aviation supply) and Navy aviation medical and chaplain's corps personnel, as well as ground-based air defense units, and those units necessary for command and control (management and planning for manpower, intelligence, operations and training, and logistics functions), aviation command and control (tactical air command, air defense control, air support control, and air traffic control), communications, and aviation ground support (e.g., airfield services, bulk fuels/aircraft refueling, crash rescue, engineer construction and utilities support, EOD, motor transport, ground equipment supply and maintenance, local security/law enforcement, and the wing band).
- The Logistics Combat Element (LCE), organized into battalions, regiments, and groups, has its own headquarters element for command and control (management and planning for manpower, intelligence, operations and training, and logistics functions) of its subordinate units and contains the majority of the combat service support units for the MAGTF, including: heavy motor transport, ground supply, heavy engineer support, ground equipment maintenance, and advanced medical and dental units, along with certain specialized groups such as air delivery, EOD, and landing support teams.

The four core elements describe types of forces needed and not actual military units or commands. The basic structure of the MAGTF never varies, though the number, size, and type of Marine Corps units composing each of its four elements will always be mission dependent. The flexibility of the organizational structure allows for one or more subordinate MAGTFs to be assigned.

Seabees of the U.S. Navy may be deployed in support of a MAGTF.

== Types ==
=== Marine Expeditionary Force (MEF) ===
A Marine Expeditionary Force (MEF), commanded by a lieutenant general, is composed of a MEF headquarters group (MEF HQG), a Marine division (MARDIV), a Marine Aircraft Wing (MAW), and a Marine Logistics Group (MLG).

For comparison purposes, in relation to other U.S. ground and air combat forces, the MEF HQG may be considered as roughly analogous to a notional U.S. Army (USA) division headquarters that also contains a combined battlefield surveillance brigade (BFSB)/maneuver enhancement brigade (Army MEB). This comparison is based on the fact that the MEF HQG contains several of the key components of the BSB and Army MEB (viz., network support, military intelligence, military police, and long-range surveillance) resident in its organic communications, intelligence, law enforcement, and radio battalions and attached force reconnaissance company.

The MARDIV, containing two or three infantry regiments, an artillery regiment, and several separate armored vehicle battalions (i.e., tank, assault amphibian, and light armored reconnaissance) and other combat support battalions (i.e., reconnaissance, combat engineer, and headquarters) is approximately equivalent to a notional U.S. Army light infantry division organized with two or three Brigade Combat teams, division artillery (DIVARTY), a division sustainment brigade, a division headquarters and headquarters battalion and others, and is reinforced with an Armored Brigade Combat Team (ABCT). (While the tank battalion of a MARDIV has fewer tanks than an ABCT, with 58 versus 90, respectively, the MARDIV assault amphibian vehicle (AAV) battalion has four companies of 42 AAVs each and is capable of transforming an entire Marine infantry regiment into an amphibious mechanized infantry force.)

The MAW, with its aircraft groups (MAGs) and air control groups (MACGs), is comparable to a notional U.S. Air Force (USAF) numbered air force consisting of a mix of several USAF wings and USA combat aviation brigades (nominally at least two of each). Lastly, the MLG and its organic logistics regiments are the USMC organizational and functional equivalents of a USA Sustainment Command (Expeditionary) and its constituent sustainment brigades.

The MEF, which varies in size, is capable of conducting missions across the full range of military operations and to support and sustain itself for up to 60 days in an austere expeditionary environment. For example, the I Marine Expeditionary Force (I MEF) is composed of the I MEF Headquarters Group, the 1st Marine Division, the 3rd Marine Aircraft Wing and the 1st Marine Logistics Group, all based on the West Coast. Two notable deployments of an entire MEF were when I Marine Expeditionary Force deployed in support of Operations Desert Shield and Desert Storm. I MEF ultimately consisted of the 1st and 2nd Marine Divisions as well as considerable Marine air and support units. I MEF also deployed to Somalia in December 1992 for the humanitarian relief effort there as well as deploying to Kuwait beginning in 2002 and taking part in the 2003 Invasion of Iraq.

The three Marine expeditionary forces are:

- I Marine Expeditionary Force located at Camp Pendleton, California
- II Marine Expeditionary Force located at Camp Lejeune, North Carolina
- III Marine Expeditionary Force located at Camp Courtney, Okinawa, Japan

=== Marine Expeditionary Brigade (MEB) ===
A Marine Expeditionary Brigade (MEB) is larger than a Marine Expeditionary Unit (MEU) but smaller than a MEF. The MEB, which varies in size, is capable of conducting missions across the full range of military operations and to support and sustain itself for up to 30 days in an austere expeditionary environment. It is constructed around a reinforced infantry regiment designated as a Regimental Combat Team (RCT), a composite Marine aircraft group, and a Combat Logistics Regiment (CLR), formerly known as a brigade service support group, all commanded by a battalion-sized command element designated as a MEB headquarters group. The MEB, commanded by a general officer (either a major general or a brigadier general), is task-organized to meet the requirements of a specific situation. It can function as part of a joint task force, as the lead echelon of the MEF, or alone.

- 1st Marine Expeditionary Brigade
- 2nd Marine Expeditionary Brigade
- 3rd Marine Expeditionary Brigade
- 4th Marine Expeditionary Brigade (anti-terrorism)
- 5th Marine Expeditionary Brigade
- 9th Marine Expeditionary Brigade

=== Marine Expeditionary Unit (MEU) ===
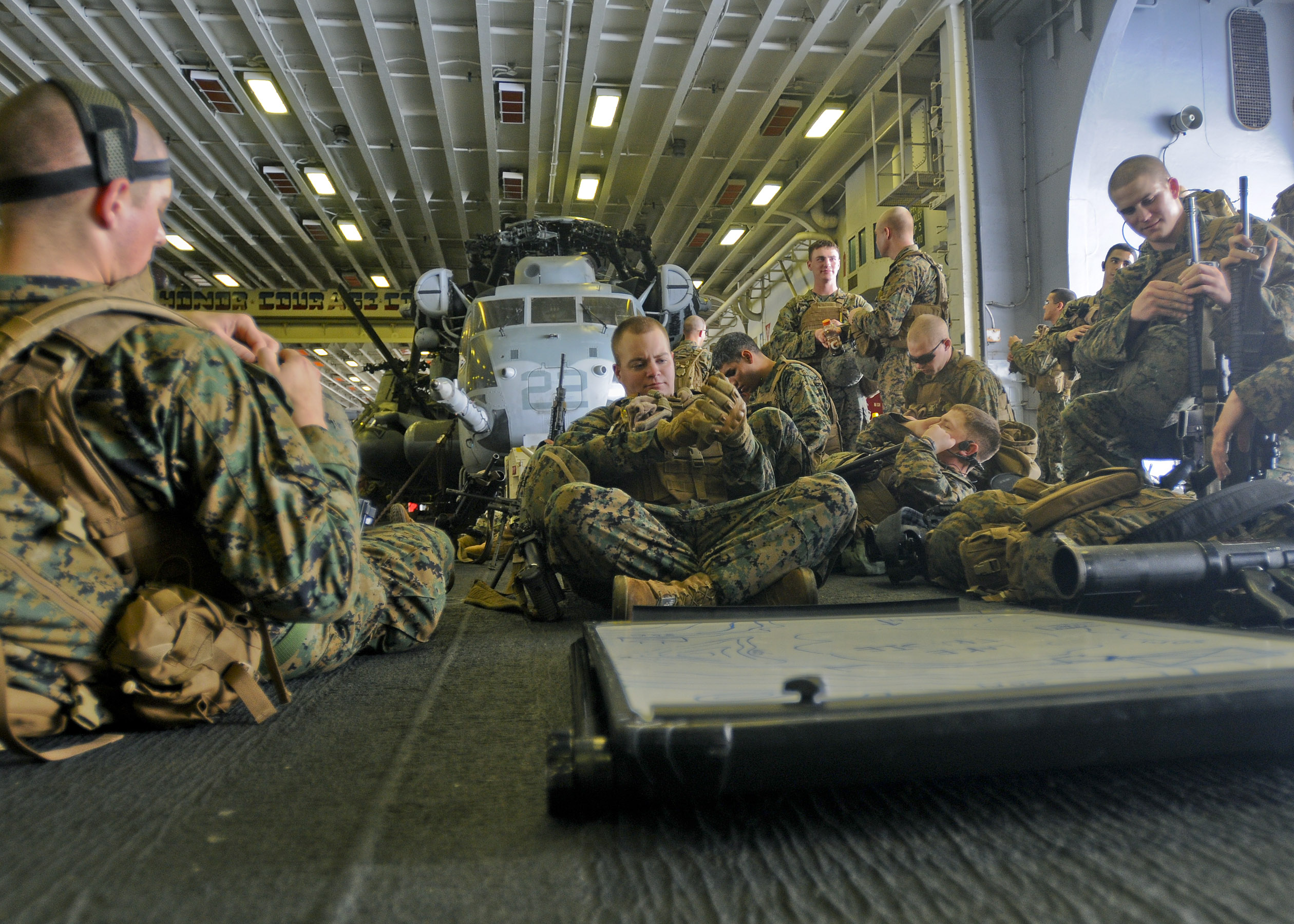
Marines of the 31st MEU wait to move to the flight deck of USS Essex during a 2010 medical evacuation drill

The smallest type of MAGTF is the Marine Expeditionary Unit (MEU) commanded by a colonel. The MEU is capable of supporting and sustaining itself for up to 15 days in an austere expeditionary environment. The MEU is based on a reinforced Marine infantry battalion, designated as a battalion landing team (BLT), supported by a medium tiltrotor squadron (VMM) (reinforced), containing both fixed-wing and rotary-wing aircraft and aviation support detachments, and a Combat Logistics Battalion (CLB), all commanded by a company-sized MEU headquarters group.

There are usually three MEUs assigned to each of the U.S. Navy Atlantic and Pacific Fleets, with another MEU based on Okinawa. While one MEU is on deployment, one MEU is training to deploy and one is standing down, resting its marines, and refitting. Each MEU can be certified as capable of performing special operations; however they are not legally defined as special operations units by the Department of Defense.

- 11th Marine Expeditionary Unit
- 13th Marine Expeditionary Unit
- 15th Marine Expeditionary Unit
- 22nd Marine Expeditionary Unit
- 24th Marine Expeditionary Unit
- 26th Marine Expeditionary Unit
- 31st Marine Expeditionary Unit

== See also ==
- Fleet Marine Force (FMF)
- Organization of the United States Marine Corps
- Special Purpose Marine Air-Ground Task Force – Crisis Response – Africa
- Special Purpose Marine Air-Ground Task Force – Crisis Response – Central Command
- United States Army's Brigade Combat Team, for comparison
- United States Marine Corps Aviation

== Bibliography ==
- Simmons, Edwin H. (2003). The United States Marines: A History, Fourth Edition. Annapolis, Maryland: Naval Institute Press. ISBN 1-59114-790-5.
