= Lieutenant colonel (United States) =

Officer rank of the United States military

- Insignia of the rank of lieutenant colonel in the USAF, USA, and USSF. Style and method of wear may vary between the services.

- From left to right: shoulder boards of the Army, Marine Corps, Air Force, and Space Force

- Insignia of the rank of lieutenant colonel in the USMC; also the insignia used for the rank of commander in the U.S. Navy, U.S. Coast Guard, U.S. PHSCC, and NOAA COC.
- Country: United States
- Service branch: United States Army; United States Marine Corps; United States Air Force; United States Space Force
- Abbreviation: USA: LTC; USMC: LtCol; USAF/USSF: Lt Col
- Rank group: Senior officer
- Rank: Lieutenant colonel
- NATO rank code: OF-4
- Pay grade: O-5
- Formation: 1775
- Next higher rank: Colonel
- Next lower rank: Major
- Equivalent ranks: Commander in the other uniformed services which use naval ranks

In the United States Army, Marine Corps, Air Force and Space Force, lieutenant colonel is a field grade officer rank, just above the rank of major and just below the rank of colonel. It is equivalent to the naval rank of commander in the other uniformed services.

The pay grade for the rank of lieutenant colonel is O-5. In the United States armed forces, the insignia for the rank is a silver oak leaf, with slight stylized differences between the version of the Army and the Air Force and that of the Navy and the Marine Corps. Oak leaves and acorns were used in the early American army on high-ranking officer's headwear and may have come from the British or Germans as oak leafs and acorns were used in German uniforms in the 18th Century. The Army and US Air Force oak leaf is a stylized silver leaf that does not represent any individual tree. The Marine Corps version is styled like a navy Commander's and is similar to a southern live oak leaf grown in the Naval Live Oaks Reservation in the 19th Century.

Promotion to lieutenant colonel is governed by Department of Defense policies derived from the Defense Officer Personnel Management Act (DOPMA) of 1980, for officers in the Active Component, and its companion Reserve Officer Personnel Management Act (ROPMA), for officers in the Reserve Component (e.g., Reserve and National Guard). DOPMA guidelines suggest that 70 percent of majors be promoted to lieutenant colonel after serving at least three years at their present rank and after 15–17 years of cumulative commissioned service.

== Nomenclature ==
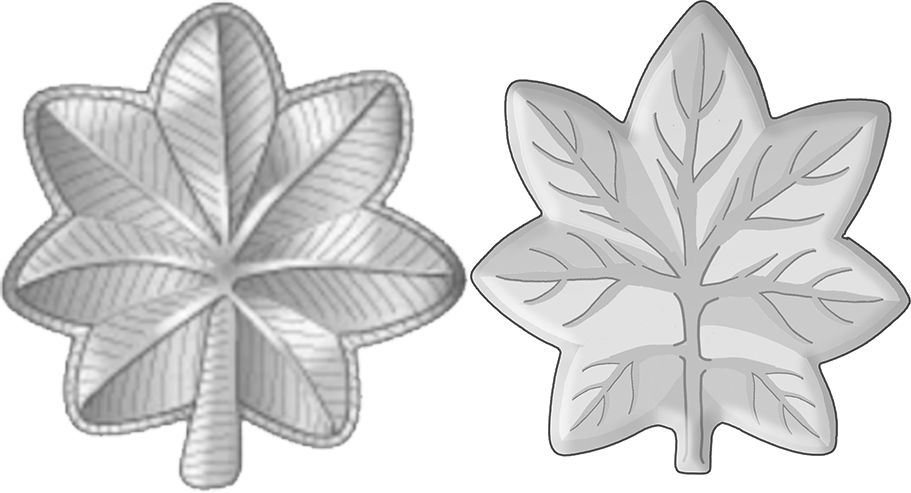
US Army/US Air Force version on the left and USMC version on the right

The U.S. Army uses the three letter abbreviation "LTC," while the Marine Corps and Air Force use the abbreviations of "LtCol" and "Lt Col" (note the space), respectively. These abbreviation formats are also outlined in The Naval Institute Guide to Naval Writing and in Air Force Handbook 33-337 (AFH 33-337), The Tongue and Quill.

The United States Government Publishing Office recommends the abbreviation "LTC" for U.S. Army usage, "LtCol" for Marine Corps usage, and "Lt. Col." for the Air Force. The Associated Press Stylebook recommends the abbreviation "Lt. Col." for the Army, Marine Corps, and Air Force.

There are various slang terms for the rank historically used in the U.S. military, mostly mocking the lieutenant colonel for not being a "full bird" colonel, include "light colonel", "short colonel", "light bird", "half colonel" (British in origin), "bottle cap colonel" (referring to the silver oak leaf insignia), and "telephone colonel" (from self-reference as "Colonel [Surname]" when using a telephone).

== History ==
The rank of lieutenant colonel has existed in England since the 16th century and was used in the militias and provincial forces of the Thirteen Colonies. The Continental Army used the rank in the same way the British Army did: as the highest-ranking officer in a line infantry regiment after its colonel. In the British army, regiments were commanded by their lieutenant colonels, as the colonel was a titular position (with the incumbent often being absent from his regiment and serving as a senior staff officer or general officer or in a political or courtly role in Britain). Since British colonels were not "combat" officers, from May 1778 onwards Continental regiments began to eliminate colonels by attrition and replace them with lieutenant colonel commandants to simplify prisoner exchanges. The conversion was never completely effected and some regiments remained commanded by colonels throughout the war. From 1784 until 1791, there was only one lieutenant colonel in the United States Army: Josiah Harmar, who acted as the army's commanding officer.

In the Continental Army aides to the Commander in Chief, viz., Lieutenant General George Washington, were lieutenant colonels. Additionally, certain officers serving under the Adjutant General, Inspector General, and Judge Advocate General, ranked as lieutenant colonels. During the 19th century, lieutenant colonel was often a terminal rank for many officers, since the full rank "colonel" was considered extremely prestigious and reserved only for the most successful officers. Upon the outbreak of the Civil War, the rank of lieutenant colonel became much more common and was used as a "stepping stone" for officers who commanded small regiments or battalions and were expected, by default, to be promoted to full colonel once the manpower of a regiment grew in strength. Such was the case of Joshua Lawrence Chamberlain, who commanded a Maine regiment as both a lieutenant colonel and later as a colonel.

After the Civil War ended, those officers remaining in the military found lieutenant colonel to again be a terminal rank, although many lieutenant colonels were raised to higher positions in a brevet status. Such was the case with George A. Custer, who was a lieutenant colonel in the regular army, but held the brevet rank of major general. The 20th century saw lieutenant colonel in its present-day status although, during the 1930s, many officers again found the rank to be terminal as the rank of colonel was reserved for only a select few officers.

== Modern usage ==
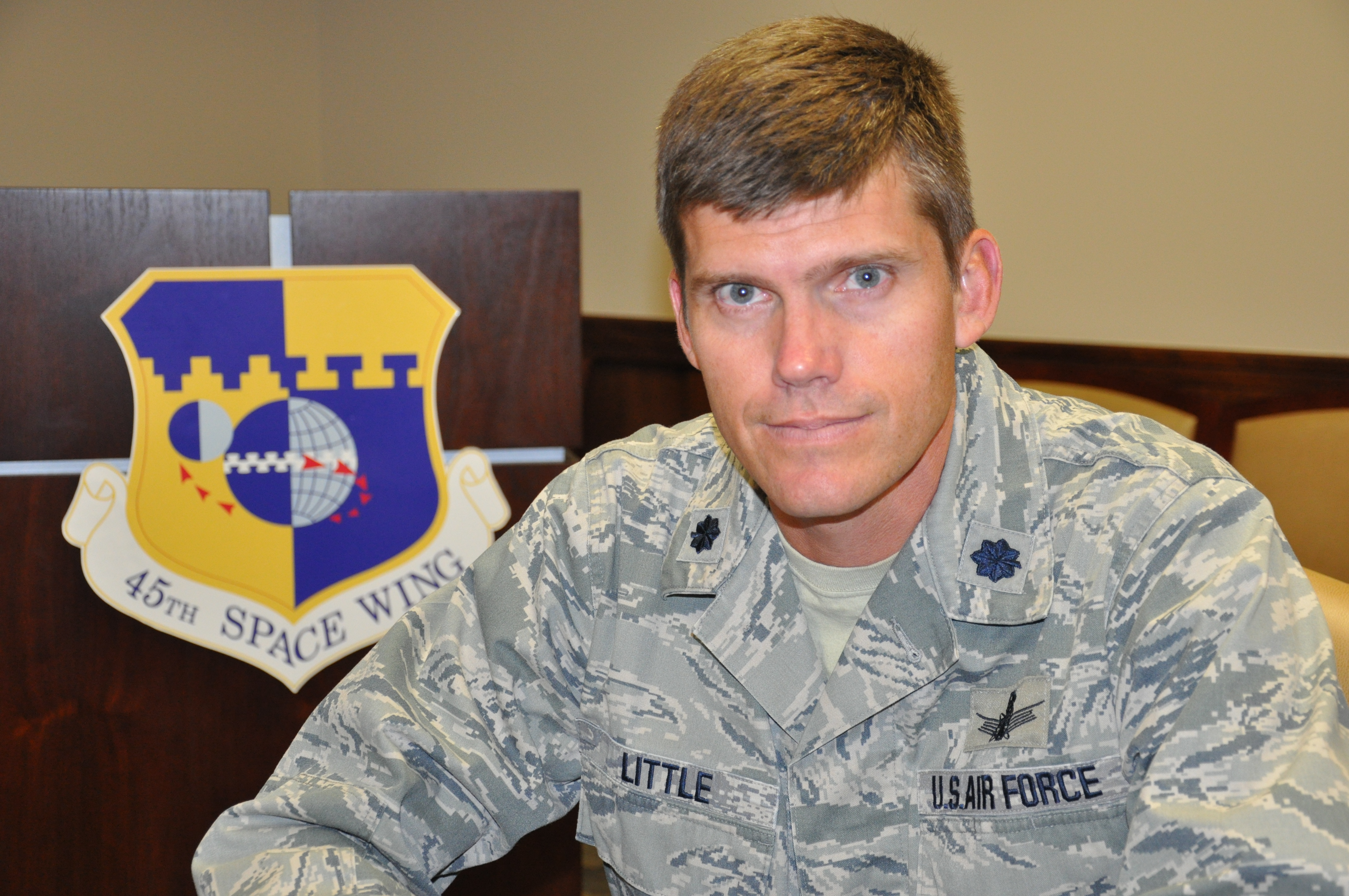
Lt. Col. Samuel A. Little (Air Force), photographed in 2014. Note silver oak leaves on collar indicating rank.

In the United States Army and the United States Marine Corps (USMC), a lieutenant colonel typically commands a battalion- or squadron-sized unit (300 to 1,200 soldiers or Marines), with a major as executive officer (XO) and a command sergeant major or sergeant major (USMC) as principal non-commissioned officer (NCO) or senior enlisted adviser (SEA). A lieutenant colonel may also serve as a brigade/brigade combat team, regiment/regimental combat team, Marine Aviation Group (MAG), Marine Expeditionary Unit (MEU), or battalion task force executive officer. Lieutenant colonels routinely serve as principal staff officers, under a colonel as chief of staff, on a general staff ("G" staff) of a division, Marine Expeditionary Brigade (MEB), Marine Aircraft Wing (MAW), or Marine Logistics Group (MLG). These staff positions include G-1 (administration and personnel), G-2 (intelligence), G-3 (operations), G-4 (logistics), G-5 (planning), G-6 (computers and communications), and G-9 (Civil Affairs). "The G-n" may mean either a specific staff section or the staff officer leading a section. Lieutenant colonels may also be junior staff at a variety of higher echelons.

In the United States Air Force, a lieutenant colonel is generally a squadron commander in the operations group, mission support group, maintenance group, or squadron commander or division chief in a medical group. The lieutenant colonel also may serve as a Director of Operations (DO) in a squadron in the operations group before assuming command of his or her own squadron (this is common for rated officers in flying units), or as a deputy commander of a squadron in the maintenance, mission-support, or medical group. Lieutenant colonels may serve also on general staff and may be the heads of some wing staff departments. Air Force lieutenant colonels in the acquisition career fields can be selected to serve as "Materiel Leaders" (Program Managers or Branch Chiefs), similar to how other Air Force lieutenant colonels are selected to serve as squadron commanders. Senior lieutenant colonels occasionally serve as group commanders, most commonly in units of the Air Force Reserve Command and the Air National Guard.

In the United States Space Force, a lieutenant colonel is a command and senior staff officer who may, like an Air Force Lt. Col. serve as a squadron commander, a staff officer for a more senior level command or as an executive officer of a Delta.

In U.S. Army ROTC detachments, the commander is typically a lieutenant colonel, with several majors, captains, and non-commissioned officers serving as assistants. In the U.S. Air Force, Air Force ROTC detachments may be commanded by full colonels or lieutenant colonels, depending on the size of the detachment and the size of the associated college or university.

== Insignia ==
U.S. Army rank insignia of a lieutenant colonel.

U.S. Marine Corps rank insignia of a lieutenant colonel's service alpha uniform.

U.S. Marine Corps rank insignia of a lieutenant colonel's blue dress uniform.

U.S. Air Force rank insignia of a lieutenant colonel.

U.S. Space Force rank insignia of a lieutenant colonel.

== Notable American lieutenant colonels ==
- Stanley T. Adams (U.S. Army), Medal of Honor recipient for his actions in Korea
- Allen Allensworth (U.S. Army)
- Eben Bartlett (U.S. Army), member of the New Hampshire House of Representatives
- Aaron Burr (Continental Army)
- Benjamin Busch (U.S. Marine Corps), TV and film actor
- James Pratt Carter (U.S. Army)
- Ernest Childers (U.S. Army), Medal of Honor recipient
- Jerry Coleman (U.S. Marine Corps)
- Robert G. Cole (U.S. Army), Medal of Honor recipient
- David P. Cooley (U.S. Air Force)
- Philip Corso (U.S. Army)
- Bruce P. "Snake" Crandall (U.S. Army), Medal of Honor recipient for his actions at Ia Drang.
- George Armstrong Custer (U.S. Army)
- James Harold "Jimmy" Doolittle (U.S. Air Force), Medal of Honor recipient for his raid on Tokyo
- Tammy Duckworth (U.S. Army), U.S. Senator (D-Illinois)
- Charity Adams Earley (U.S. Army), first African-American woman to become an officer in the Women's Army Auxiliary Corps
- Joni Ernst (Iowa Army National Guard), U.S. Senator (R-Iowa)
- William Montague Ferry Jr. (U.S. Army)
- Rick Francona (U.S. Air Force)
- John C. Fremont (U.S. Army)
- Tulsi Gabbard (U.S. Army), Director of National Intelligence (2025–26)
- Gregory D. Gadson (U.S. Army)
- Virgil I. "Gus" Grissom (U.S. Air Force)
- Dave Grossman (U.S. Army), professor of psychology and military science, author, and speaker
- David "Bull" Gurfein (U.S. Marine Corps)
- Iceal Hambleton (U.S. Air Force)
- Alexander Hamilton (Continental Army)
- Anthony B. Herbert (U.S. Army)
- Christopher B. Howard (U.S. Air Force)
- Lisa Jaster (U.S. Army), first female USAR officer to become a Ranger School graduate.
- Shawna R. Kimbrell (U.S. Air Force), the first female African-American fighter pilot
- Gus Kohntopp (U.S. Air National Guard)
- Robert Kuertz (U.S. Air Force), Legion of Merit, Distinguished Flying Cross, Air Medal, Joint Service Commendation Medal, Air and Space Commendation Medal, Air and Space Outstanding Unit Award, Army Good Conduct Medal, American Defense Service Medal, American Campaign Medal, European-African-Middle Eastern Campaign Medal, World War II Victory Medal, Vietnam Service Medal, Air and Space Longevity Service Award, Republic of Vietnam Campaign Medal
- John Laurens (Continental Army)
- Bruce R. McConkie (U.S. Army), apostle, The Church of Jesus Christ of Latter-day Saints
- Bob McDonnell (U.S. Army), former Republican Attorney General and Governor of Virginia.
- Amy McGrath (U.S. Marine Corps), political candidate, first female pilot to fly the F/A-18 on a combat mission
- Hal Moore (U.S. Army), famous for his actions at Ia Drang
- Michael Mori (U.S. Marine Corps), lawyer and military judge (retired), known for representing David Hicks
- Dick Muri (U.S. Air Force)
- Oliver North (U.S. Marine Corps)
- Ellison S. Onizuka (U.S. Air Force)
- Ralph Peters (U.S. Army)
- Rob Riggle (U.S. Marine Corps)
- William R. Rowley (U.S. Army)
- Stuart Scheller (U.S. Marine Corps)
- Richard Scheuring (U.S. Army)
- Francis R. Scobee (U.S. Air Force)
- John Shimkus (U.S. Army), U.S. Representative from Illinois
- Ronald Speirs (U.S. Army)
- Michael Strobl (U.S. Marine Corps)
- Tench Tilghman (Continental Army)
- William Travis (Texas Militia)
- Matt Urban (U.S. Army)
- John Paul Vann (U.S. Army)
- Alexander Vindman (U.S. Army)
- Allen West (U.S. Army), former U.S. Representative from Florida
- Ed White (U.S. Air Force)
- Earl Woods (U.S. Army)

== See also ==
- Lieutenant colonel (United Kingdom)
