= List of United States Marine Corps brigades =

This is a list of United States Marine Corps brigades.

== Active ==
- 2nd Marine Expeditionary Brigade
- 3rd Marine Expeditionary Brigade
- 5th Marine Expeditionary Brigade

== Inactive ==
- 1st Marine Expeditionary Brigade
- US 1st Marine Brigade (Provisional)
- US 2nd Marine Brigade (Provisional)
- US 3rd Marine Brigade (Provisional)
- 4th Marine Expeditionary Brigade (Anti-Terrorism)
- 6th Marine Expeditionary Brigade
- 7th Marine Expeditionary Brigade
- 9th Marine Expeditionary Brigade
