= 5th Marine Expeditionary Brigade =

- Active: 1918 – 1919; 1990 – ? 15 October 2015 – Present
- Country: United States of America
- Branch: United States Marine Corps
- Type: MAGTF
- Motto: "Right Force - Right Now"
- Engagements: World War I; Meuse–Argonne offensive; Operation Desert Storm

Commanders
- Current commander: Brigadier General Stephen Lightfoot
- Notable commanders: William T. Fairbourn; James D. Beans; Matthew G. Trollinger; Farrell J. Sullivan

The 5th Marine Expeditionary Brigade is a United States Marine Corps unit. When deployed, it serves as a Marine Air-Ground Task Force.

== History ==
5th MEB first activated during World War I and served in France guarding supply lines and garrisons that were critical to supporting the 5th and 6th Marine Regiments during the allied defeat of the German army in the Meuse-Argonne Offensive.

During the Cuban Missile Crisis, Amphibious Group Three embarked units of the 5th Marine Expeditionary Brigade and sailed from San Diego on 27 October, with two reinforced amphibious squadrons and the amphibious command ship USS Eldorado (AGC-11). The Panama Canal was closed to commercial shipping and on 5 November warships of Amphibious Group Three, with 11,000 Marines and Sailors embarked, arrived in Panama. The 22 amphibious ships passed through the canal to the Caribbean with the 5th MEB operated with the Atlantic Fleet until the end of the missile crisis. 5th MEB returned to the West Coast on 15 December 1962. For the remainder of 1962, the ships were moored in Long Beach and San Diego with the heavy cargo of 5th MEB remaining on board until after Christmas.

In 1970, 5th MEB was active at Camp Pendleton in Camp San Mateo. 3rd Battalion 3rd Marine Regiment was part of 5th MEB then.

In 1990, the 5th MEB activated for the Gulf War and served in the Persian Gulf as part of an amphibious ready group. The amphibious ready group conducted an amphibious warfare maneuver from the sea called an amphibious demonstration as a deception operation.

In 1991, the 5th MEB was reallocated to aid with Operation Sea Angel, the United States response to the 1991 Bangladesh cyclone.

=== 2015 ===
It was reactivated on 15 October 2015 at Naval Support Activity Bahrain. It was a redesignation of Command Element, Marine Forces Central Command Forward.

== See also ==
NATO Symbol

5

- Marine Air-Ground Task Force
- Organization of the United States Marine Corps
