= Marine Expeditionary Brigade =

Intermediate-sized Marine Air-Ground Task Force in the United States Marine Corps

A Marine Expeditionary Brigade (MEB) is a formation of the United States Marine Corps, a Marine Air–Ground Task Force of approximately 14,500 Marines and sailors constructed around a reinforced infantry regiment, a composite Marine aircraft group, a combat logistics regiment and a MEB command group. The MEB, commanded by a general officer (usually a brigadier general), is task-organized to meet the requirements of a specific situation. It can function as part of a joint task force, as the lead echelon of the Marine Expeditionary Force (MEF), or alone. It varies in size and composition, and is larger than a Marine Expeditionary Unit (MEU) but smaller than a MEF. The MEB is capable of conducting missions across the full range of military operations.

NATO Map Symbol

== Notional Marine expeditionary brigade in 2010 ==
=== Command element (CE) ===
MEB command group

- MEB Staff
- Detachment, Communications Battalion
- Detachment, Intelligence Battalion
- Detachment, Law Enforcement Battalion
- Detachment, Radio Battalion
- Detachment, Air Naval Gunfire Liaison Company
- Detachment, Force Reconnaissance Company

=== Ground combat element (GCE) ===
Regimental Landing Team (RLT) or Regimental Combat Team (RCT)

- Infantry Regiment (w/ 3 Infantry Battalions), Reinforced
- 48 Amphibious Assault Vehicles, AAV-7A1 and variants (1 Amphibious Assault Vehicle Company (Reinforced))
- 27 Light Armored Vehicles, LAV-25A1 and variants (1 Light Armored Reconnaissance Company (Reinforced))
- 14 Main Battle Tank, M1A1, Abrams (1 Tank Company (Reinforced))
- 2 Armored Recovery Vehicle, M88A2, Hercules (1 Tank Company (Reinforced))
- 2 Assault Breacher Vehicle, M1, Shredder (Combat Engineer Company)
- 24 Howitzer, 155 mm, M777A2 (1 Artillery Battalion w/4 firing batteries of 6 guns each)
- 24 Mortar, 81mm, M252 (4 tubes per section, 2 sections per platoon, of the Mortar Platoon, Weapons Company, Infantry Battalion × 3)
- 27 Lightweight Mortar, 60 mm, M224 LWCMS (3 tubes in the Mortar Section of the Weapons Platoon, Rifle company × 3, Infantry Battalion × 3)
- 24 Anti-Tank Missile Launcher, BGM-71, TOW (8 launchers in the TOW Section of the Anti-Tank (AT) Platoon, Weapons Company, Infantry Battalion × 3)
- 24 Anti-Tank Missile Launcher, FGM-148, Javelin (8 launchers in the AT Section of the Anti-Tank Platoon, Weapons Company, Infantry Battalion × 3)
- 18 Automatic Grenade Launcher, 40 mm, Mk 19 (6 guns per Heavy Machine Gun Platoon, Weapons Company, Infantry Battalion × 3)
- 18 Browning Machine Gun, Cal. .50, M2, HB, Flexible (6 guns per Heavy Machine Gun Platoon, Weapons Company, Infantry Battalion × 3)
- 54 Machine Gun, 7.62mm, M240 (6 guns in the Machine Gun Section, Weapons Platoon, Rifle Company × 3, Infantry Battalion × 3)
- 243 Light Machine Gun/Infantry Automatic Rifle, 5.56mm, M249 (9 guns per Rifle Platoon × 3, Rifle Company × 3, Infantry Battalion × 3)

=== Aviation combat element (ACE) ===
Composite Marine aircraft group

- Marine Aircraft Group (MAG) [notional organization shown below]
- 45 AV-8B (3 VMA squadrons w/ 15 aircraft each)
- 24 F/A-18 (2 VMFA squadrons w/ 12 aircraft each)
- 5 EA-6B (1 VMAQ squadron w/ 5 aircraft each)
- 6 KC-130 (1 VMGR detachment)
- 32 CH-53E (2 HMH squadrons w/ 16 aircraft each)
- 48 CH-46E or MV-22B (4 HMM or VMM squadrons w/ 12 aircraft each)
- 18 AH-1Z (1 HMLA squadron, each HMLA squadron contains both AH-1 & UH-1 aircraft)
- 9 UH-1Y (1 HMLA squadron, each HMLA squadron contains both AH-1 & UH-1 aircraft)
- 45 Stinger missile teams (1 Low Altitude Air Defense firing battery w/ 3 platoons of 15 Stinger missile teams each)
- 1 Marine Aviation Logistics Squadron (MALS) (Provides Aircraft Intermediate Maintenance, Aviation Supply, and Aviation Ordnance support to aircraft squadrons)
- 1 Marine Wing Support Squadron (MWSS) (Provides Combat Service Support [i.e., all essential aviation ground support and services] to enable the MAG to perform its aviation mission)
- Other aviation support squadron detachments as required (MACS, MASS, MTACS, MWCS)

=== Logistics combat element (LCE) ===
Combat Logistics Regiment (CLR) (w/ 1 to 3 combat logistics Battalions) [notional equipment shown below]

- 1 medium girder bridge
- 6 cranes:
  - 1 30-ton crane
  - 5 7.5-ton cranes
- 2 600k-gal fuel systems
- 44 100-kW generators
- 75 7-ton trucks
- 9 Water purifying units
- 116 forklifts
- 5 bulldozers
- 3 road graders

== List of MEBs ==
- 1st Marine Expeditionary Brigade
- 2nd Marine Expeditionary Brigade
- 3rd Marine Expeditionary Brigade
- 5th Marine Expeditionary Brigade
- 7th Marine Expeditionary Brigade

== Historical MEBs ==
The following MEBs were deployed operationally:

- Task Force Tarawa for the Iraq War
- Task Force Leatherneck for the Afghanistan War
- 9th Marine Expeditionary Brigade for the Vietnam War – deployed March 8, 1965
- 4th Marine Expeditionary Brigade (Anti-Terrorism) for the war on terror - activated on 29 October 2001 and deactivated in February 2006
