= 4th Marine Expeditionary Brigade =

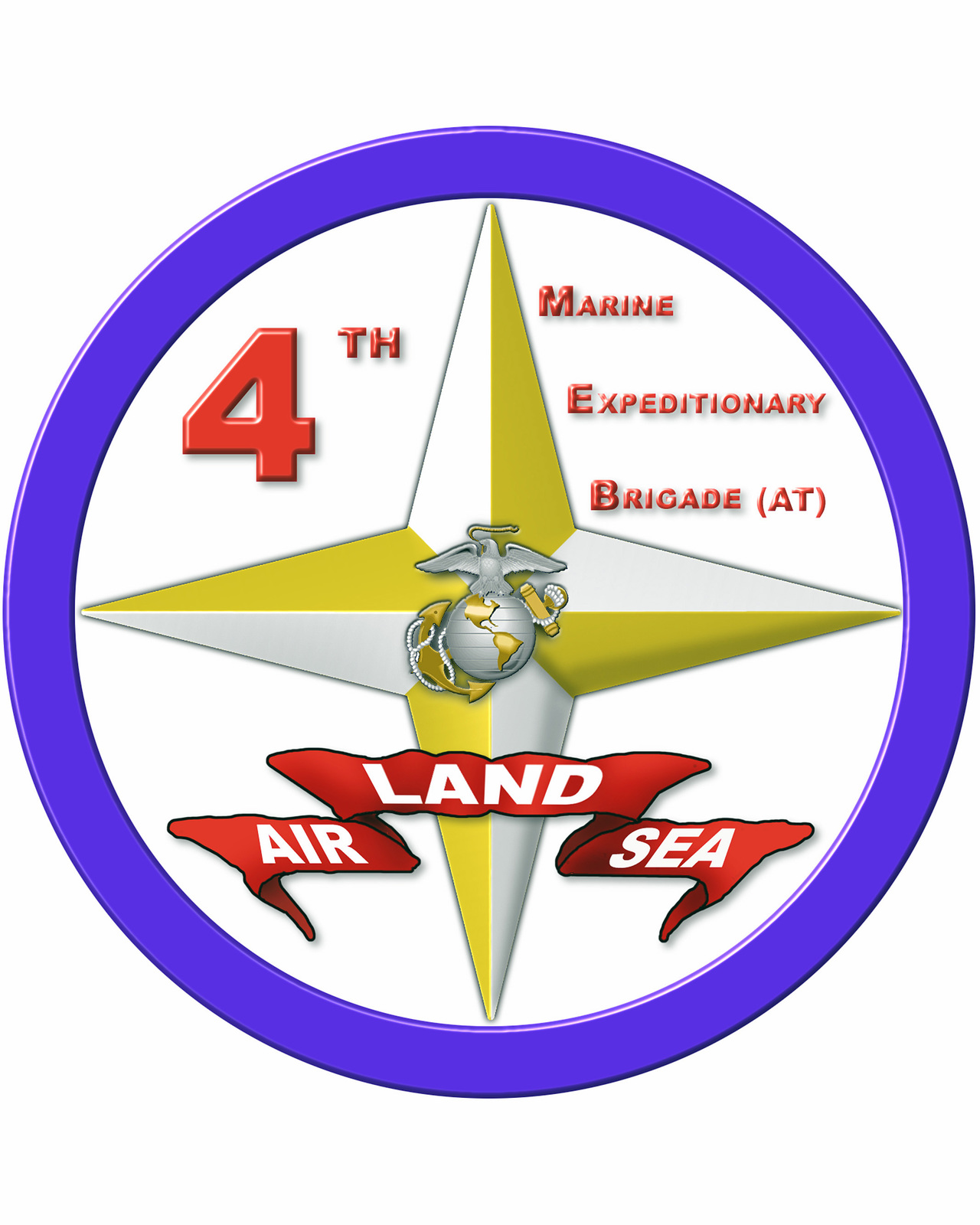
- The logo of the 4th MEB
- Country: United States of America
- Branch: United States Marine Corps
- Motto: "A New Reality!"

The 4th Marine Expeditionary Brigade was a marine expeditionary brigade unit of the United States Marine Corps (USMC) that was designed specifically for combined arms operations in desert and urban terrains, counterinsurgency in jungle and urban terrains, NBCR on operations in contaminated environments, providing security in areas at risk of terrorism, support crowd control and riot control in the U.S. consulate or embassy areas abroad, and urban counterterrorism.

Its mission was to be able to quickly deploy anywhere in the world to combat terrorism and deter, detect, and defend from terrorist groups both domestically and internationally. The unit became operational on 29 October 2001, and was deactivated in February 2006.

== History ==
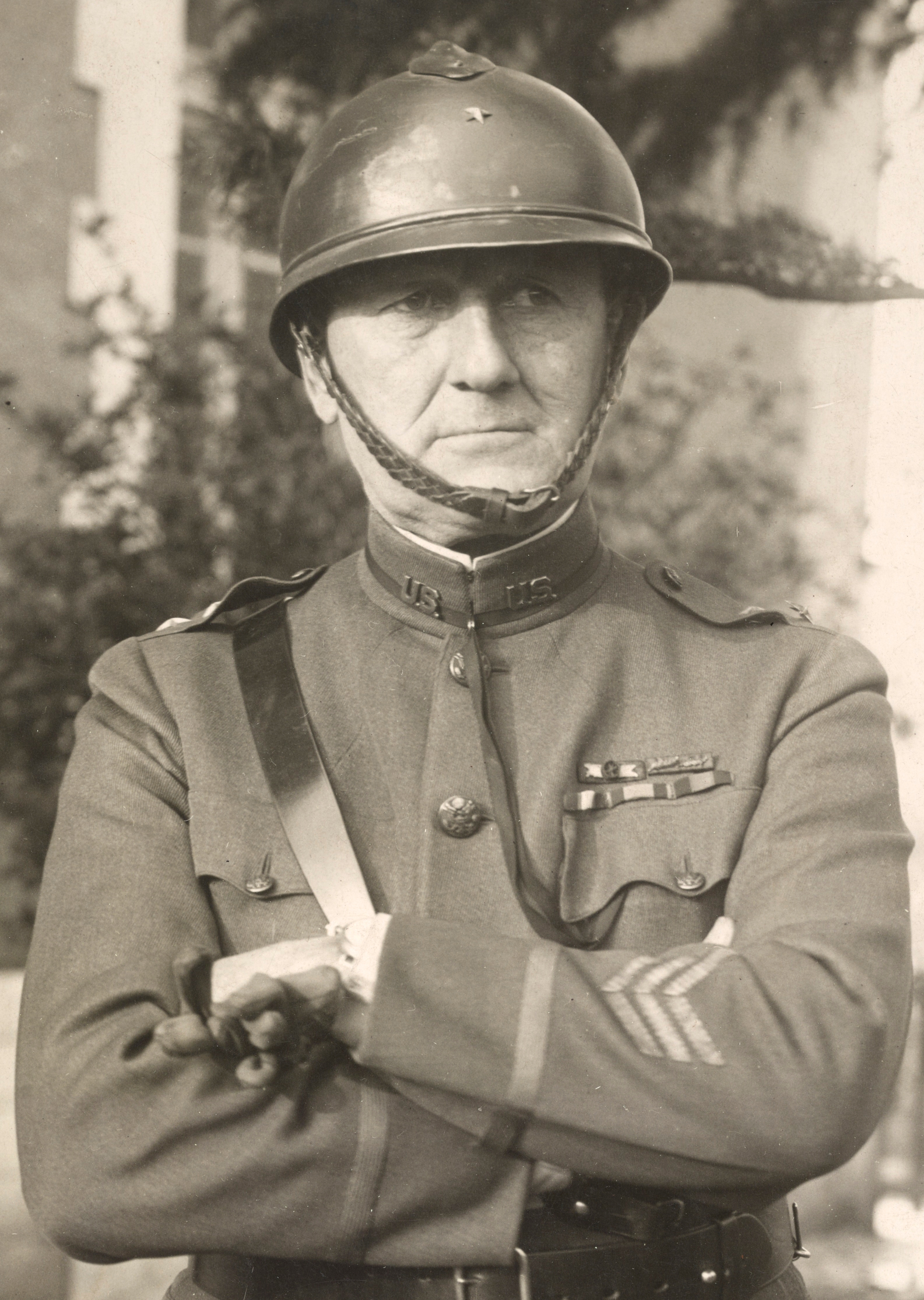
James G. Harbord commanded the 4th Marine Brigade in France 1918.

The 4th Brigade was originally formed during World War I as the 4th Marine Brigade. It served in France as one of the two infantry brigades of the U.S. Army 2nd Infantry Division, and all Marine combat units in World War I were organized under the 4th Marine Brigade. The 4th fought actions at Belleau Wood, Soissons, and Meuse-Argonne.

Following World War I, the brigade was deactivated until just before the commitment to the Vietnam War in 1964, when it was activated as the 4th Marine Amphibious Brigade and deployed to the East Coast and Caribbean for counterinsurgency exercises. It participated in the intervention in the Dominican Republic in 1965.

In the 1970s, the 4th MAB's task changed from counterterrorism to defending NATO's north flanking maneuver against the Soviet Union. It was designated to reinforce Norwegian airfields and support a naval campaign to protect Norway. The next major operations for the 4th Marine Amphibious Brigade were Operations Desert Shield and Desert Storm in the 1990s. The main mission performed by the 4th MAB was Operation Eastern Exit, during which the brigade rescued the Soviet ambassador, the U.S. ambassador, and 300 other dignitaries from Mogadishu, Somalia.

After a period of deactivation, the 4th Brigade was reactivated as the 4th Marine Expeditionary Brigade (Anti-Terrorism) on 29 October 2001 at ceremonies held at Camp Lejeune to combat domestic and international urban terrorism.

The 4th MEB (AT) was permanently organized with the Chemical, Biological Incident Response Force (CBIRF) and an Anti-Terrorism Battalion (AT Bn), currently 3d Battalion, 8th Marine Regiment, and, as such, was composed of approximately 1,400 Marines and Sailors.

== Organization ==
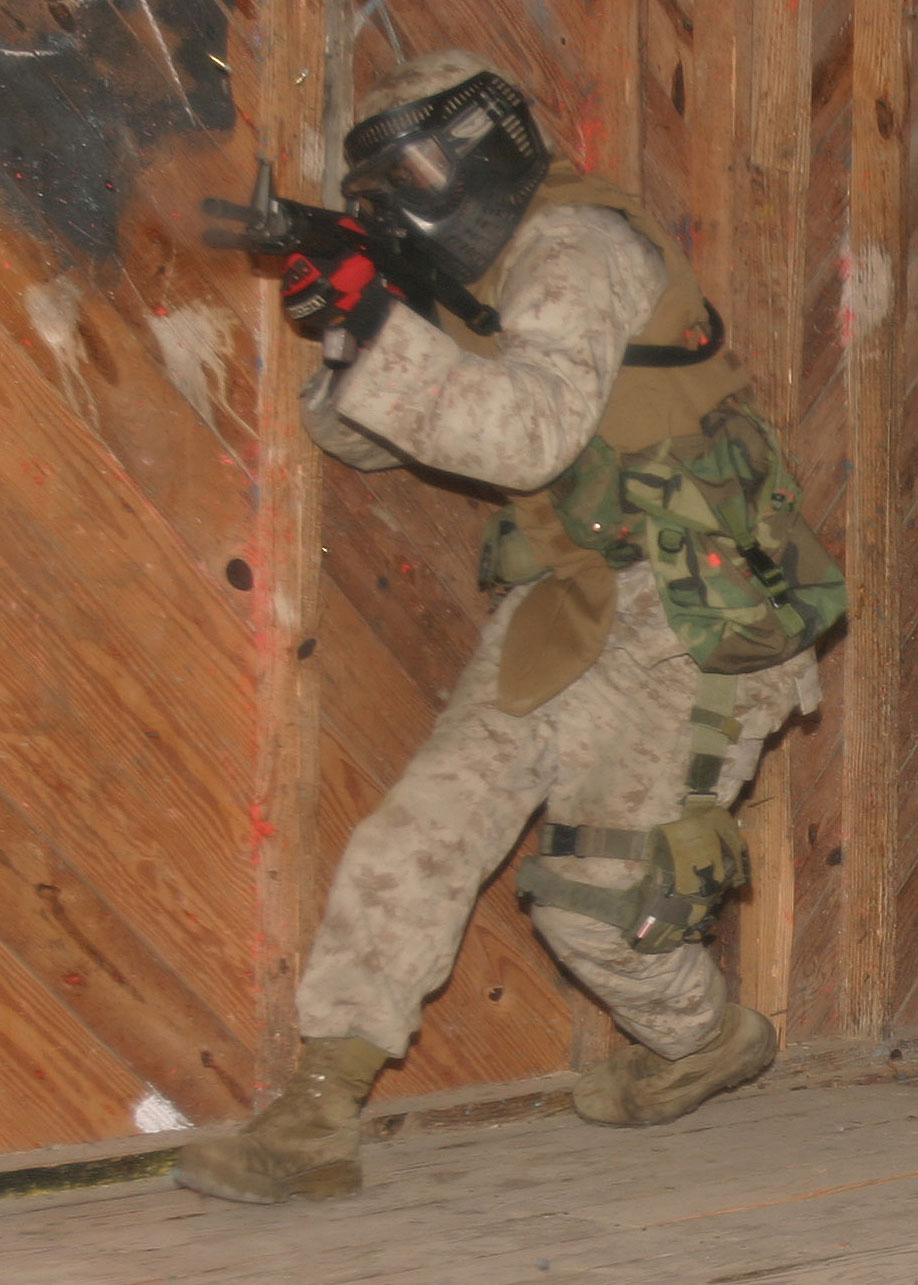
Room-to-room house-clearing techniques are a part of the training simulated at Combat Town, Camp Lejeune in 2005.

The 4th MEB was a unit designed to work independently, but also trained to work with other Marine units. It was organized with a couple of other units, like the Chemical Biological Incident Response Force (CBIRF). Being paired with this and many other units, like the security force battalion, broadened the range of circumstances that the 4th MEB could respond to. The wealth of assets at the 4th MEB's disposal made it very deadly and able to excel at missions. When a mission came up, the 4th MEB could be paired with almost any other Marine unit, like aviation and ground forces, to increase the mission's chance of success. The 4th MEB Marines underwent extensive training to become part of the anti-terrorism team, with urban warfare tactics being prioritized. An example was Basic Urban Skills Training (BUST), the goal of which was to better train soldiers for urban environments.

The 4th MEB was categorized as a Marine air-ground task force (MAGTF), which was a subdivision of a Marine expeditionary force. With about 4,800 Marines and sailors, an MEB is large enough to sustain itself for long periods, but can also send smaller Marine expeditionary units (MEUs) on patrol.

== Awards ==
On 26 July 2002, the 4th MEB became the first regular military unit to ever receive the Department of State Group Superior Honor Award for the hard work and dedication of its Marines and sailors during Operation Enduring Freedom. The award recognized Company K, 4th MEB (AT) for outstanding service while stationed at the American Embassy in Kabul, Afghanistan.

== See also ==
- 1st Marine Expeditionary Brigade
- 2nd Marine Expeditionary Brigade
- 3rd Marine Expeditionary Brigade

== Notes ==
Citations

References used

- "4th Marine Expeditionary Brigade (Anti-terrorism)" (PDF). United States Marine Corps. Archived from the original (PDF) on 27 June 2004.
- "Commandant activates 4th Marine Expeditionary Brigade". News Release. USMC, Camp Lejeune Public Information Office. 25 October 2001. Archived from the original on 29 February 2004.
- "Yearly Chronologies of the United States Marine Corps - 2002" (asp). U.S. Marine Corps History Division.
- Higgins, Sgt. Joshua S. (6 November 2001). "4th MEB focuses on MOUT" (asp). News Release. USMC, Camp Lejeune Public Information Office.
- Jones, 1st Lt. Charlie (24 October 2001). "Marine Corps Brigade Reactivation". News Release. USMC, Camp Lejeune Public Information Office. Archived from the original on 5 November 2001.
- Lynch, R.P. "The End of the Road for the 4th MEB (AT)" (PDF). United States Marine Corps. Archived (PDF) from the original on 2 April 2015.
- Pike, John. "4th Marine Expeditionary Brigade (Antiterrorism)". Global Security.org.
- Polmar, Norman (2005). The Naval Institute Guide to the Ships and Aircraft of the U.S. Fleet. Washington, DC: Naval Institute Press. ISBN 1-59114-685-2.
- Traynham, Stephen L. (24 February 2006). "4th MEB to deactivate". II Marine Expeditionary Force. U.S. Marine Corps website. Archived from the original (asp) on 23 February 2013.
