= Camp Courtney =

U.S. Marine Base located in Uruma, Okinawa Prefecture, Japan

Coordinates: 26°23′31″N 127°51′34″E

- Okinawa, Japan
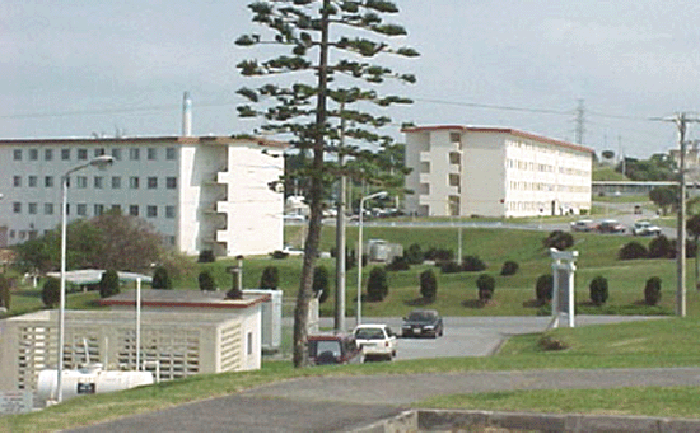
- Barracks buildings on Camp Courtney (as seen from behind the movie theater).

Site information
- Type: Military base
- Controlled by: United States Marine Corps

Site history
- In use: January 1956–present

Garrison information
- Garrison: III MEF, 3d MarDiv, and 3d MEB.

Camp Courtney (Japanese: キャンプ・コートニー, Hepburn: Kyampu Kōtonī) is a U.S. Marine Base located in Uruma City, Okinawa Prefecture, Japan. It is part of the larger Marine Corps Base Camp Smedley D. Butler and home to the III Marine Expeditionary Force, 3rd Marine Division, and 3d MEB Headquarters. It is named after Major Henry A. Courtney Jr., who was killed in action in the Battle of Okinawa and covers 1.339 mi^{2} (3.47 km^{2}) in the Konbu, Tengan, and Uken districts of Uruma.

== History ==
Camp Courtney was opened as a U.S. Marine Base in January 1956, when select units of the 3rd Marine Division were transferred there from Camp McGill in Yokosuka, Kanagawa, Japan. Initially the base was called by its original name, Camp Tengan. The first Marine units occupied Quonset huts, Nissen huts and Butler buildings. Most of the huts were "strong-backed", which means they had concrete or concrete block ends, with cables strung over them at intervals whose ends were anchored in the ground in concrete, and had wooden hurricane shutters over the windows. This was to protect the buildings during the frequent typhoons that visit the Ryukyu Islands. The original units at Camp Tengan were Headquarters Battalion, the Division Band and a truck battalion. Division Headquarters was mainly in a sprawling, one-story building just inside the main gate. Some other units, such as Division Legal Office, were in separate buildings. There was an Army anti-aircraft battery located adjacent to the camp. That unit used to conduct live-fire exercises once a month. For some new arrivals, the unannounced firing sometimes caused momentary consternation.

Camp Courtney houses many military families, has a movie theater, exchange, commissary, medical and dental clinics, post office, chapel and bank. Many Marines living on Camp McTureous are stationed on Camp Courtney.

The Michael Brown Okinawa assault incident occurred just outside the base on 2 November 2002.
