= 3rd Marine Expeditionary Brigade =

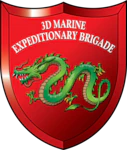
- The new official logo of the 3D MEB, as of Jan 2021
- Active: December 14, 1917 - April 30, 1919 march 28, 1927 - January 14, 1929; March 21, 1942 - July 14, 1947; June 1, 1951 - January 7, 1952; May 1962 - June 27, 1971; January 1, 2000 - present
- Country: United States
- Allegiance: United States of America
- Branch: United States Marine Corps
- Type: MAGTF
- Role: Crisis Response
- Size: Scalable and tailorable based on assigned mission, can be up to ~6,000
- Part of: III Marine Expeditionary Force
- Garrison/HQ: Camp Courtney, Okinawa

Commanders
- Notable commanders: Smedley Butler; Thomas Watson; Chesty Puller; Marion Eugene Carl; Paul J. Rock Jr. Kyle B. Ellison

The 3rd Marine Expeditionary Brigade is a United States Marine Corps unit that is the "middleweight" crises response force of choice in the Pacific Area of Operation. It is the Marine Corps’ only permanently forward-deployed Brigade sized Marine Air-Ground Task Force and is a resilient, ready and relevant force able to rapidly deploy and conduct operations across the spectrum from humanitarian assistance and disaster relief to amphibious assault and high intensity combat. 3d MEB maintains a forward presence in the Pacific Theater to support contingencies and alliance relationships. 3d MEB also conducts combined operations and training throughout the region in support of United States national security strategy.

== History ==
=== Early years ===
In December 1917 the 3rd Provisional Brigade was activated in Marine Corps Base Quantico, Virginia from elements of the Advanced Base Force and was subsequently deployed to Cuba to protect U.S. sugar producing interests, which were becoming victim to sabotage by German-backed Cuban rebels. Upon arrival in Cuba with the 9th Marine Regiment, the Brigade took control of the 7th Marine Regiment and began to protect U.S. owned property, freeing up the Cuban Army to chase the rebels. In early 1918 rebel activity had subsided and the Brigade was relocated in August 1918 to Galveston, Texas to serve as a ready force should a contingency arise in the Caribbean. The following April the Brigade was deactivated.

In March 1927, the 3rd Marine Brigade was again activated at MCB Quantico under the command of Brigadier General Smedley Butler. The Brigade subsequently deployed to Shanghai, China with artillery and aviation assets. Once they arrived in China, the brigade took control of the 4th Marine Regiment and the 6th Marine Regiment upon their arrival in May. During this period, the Brigade was responsible for aiding the foreign powers present in keeping the Chinese out of the international settlement, which was becoming a target of Chinese anti-foreign sentiment. In 1928, Chiang Kai-shek became president of China and the Brigade was subsequently withdrawn and deactivated in January 1929.

=== World War II ===
In March 1942, the Brigade was reactivated at Marine Corps Air Station New River, North Carolina and deployed to Western Samoa, to garrison and defend the island. The Brigade was composed of the 7th Marines and 1/11 Marines. The Brigade was again deactivated in November 1943.

In 1946 the Marine Corps was ordered to begin demobilizing its ranks. When the 6th Marine Division, stationed in Qingdao, China began to deactivate, the remaining headquarters, service, medical, and artillery battalions along with the 4th Marine Regiment were redesignated the 3d Marine Brigade in April. They continued to perform occupation duties until the remaining Brigade personnel were absorbed into the 4th Marine Regiment in June and the Brigade again ceased to exist.

Post-war Southern California and the newly established Marine Corps Base Camp Pendleton saw massive numbers of Marines and units returning from the war in the Pacific. In September 1946 as replacement draftees were being sent overseas to allow the combat veterans performing occupation duties to return home, the 3rd Marine Brigade was again established with the 6th Marine Regiment as its nucleus. The Brigade consisted primarily of administrative groups and some infantry units as they returned to the states to be deactivated. In May 1947 the 1st Marine Division reclaimed the rest of the personnel returning from overseas as well as those in the Brigade, which again was deactivated.

=== 1950s through 1990s ===
After the Marine Corps’ quick response to the Korean War and expansion of its ranks, the Brigade headquarters was again established in June 1951 around the 3rd Marine Regiment at MCB Camp Pendleton. In 1952 Congress mandated that the Marine Corps be maintained at a strength no less than three divisions and aircraft wings. In response, the Commandant of the Marine Corps designated the 3rd Marine Brigade as the nucleus of the soon to be reactivated 3rd Marine Division. In January 1952, the Brigade was absorbed by the division and once again ceased to exist.

In May 1962, in response to the Soviet Union aiding the Pathet Lao Army in Laos, the 3d Marine Expeditionary Brigade was formed from 3rd Marine Division personnel and began landing 3000 Marines as a show of force in Thailand as a component of Joint Task Force 116. The MEB forces included the 3rd Battalion, 9th Marines, HMR-261 and VMA-332. The show of force was over by August and the MEB was reabsorbed into the 3rd Marine Division.

In April 1965 as the forces began to build up in the Republic of Vietnam, the 3d MEB was reactivated at Camp Hague, Okinawa, boarded transport ships of the 7th Fleet and sailed for the Republic of Vietnam. En route to the Republic of Vietnam, the MEB was redesignated the 3rd Marine Amphibious Brigade. They arrived off the coast later that month, conducted a landing in Chu Lai and established an expeditionary airfield. At the end of the month the MAB was deactivated and absorbed into the III Marine Amphibious Force (III MAF).

In April 1971, III MAF withdrew from the Republic of Vietnam and the 3rd MAB was reactivated at Da Nang to oversee the 13,600 Marines of the 1st Marine Regiment, MAG-11 and MAG-16, which remained in country while the Combined Action Program was phased out. On 7 May, ground and air operations ceased, the last ground troops sailed in June, and the 3d MAB was subsequently deactivated.

=== 2000 – present ===
In January 2000 III MEF Forward, in the midst of supporting International Force for East Timor during Operation Stabilize, stood down and the 3d Marine Expeditionary Brigade was reactivated. Since its reactivation, it has been actively engaged in regional contingency planning as well as numerous joint and combined exercises.

In late 2004, 3rd MEB provided most of the forces for Joint Task Force 535, which provided disaster relief after floods in the Philippines.

During May and June 2006 the 3d MEB provided logistics and medical support to thousands of victims of the 2006 Yogyakarta earthquake. Also in 2006, 3d MEB assisted with relief to mudslide victims as a result of the Mayon Volcano in Republic of Philippines. The MEB has a longstanding tradition of humanitarian assistance within the Philippines, and in 2007 participated Operation Goodwill, a three-part mission involving 3rd MEB and USS Comstock (LSD-45).

In November 2007 Cyclone Sidr struck Dhaka, Bangladesh killing close to 3,000 people and displacing nearly one million from their homes. 3D MEB deployed to provide humanitarian assistance and disaster relief in support of Operation Sea Angel II where they delivered over 25,000 gallons of water the first day and over 352,000 lbs. of food, tents, and clothing throughout the operation.

In 2009 and 2010 3D MEB again deployed to the Philippines to provide humanitarian assistance and disaster relief. On Oct. 18, 2010 Typhoon Juan (known as Megi locally) struck the Philippines leaving 26 dead and 39 injured. It occurred when a U.S/Philippine bilateral military exercise was already taking place. 3D MEB was already on scene and was able to team up with the Armed Forces of the Philippines to provide over 170,000 lbs. of relief supplies to those in need.

When the March 11, 2011 Tohoku earthquake and tsunami devastated the coastal areas of northeastern Japan, 3D MEB deployed to mainland Japan as a part of Operation Tomodachi as the III MEF forward. 3D MEB deployed KC-130J aircraft and helicopters from Okinawa to Sendai to assist with relief operations and distribution of emergency food, water and shelter, as well as established a Forward Command Element in Sendai to coordinate relief operations.

On 13 December 2011, the 3d MEB was officially reactivated. It has subsequently participated in exercises and operations throughout the Pacific region. The 3d MEB was declared Initially Operationally Capable in 2012 and Fully Operationally Capable in 2013.

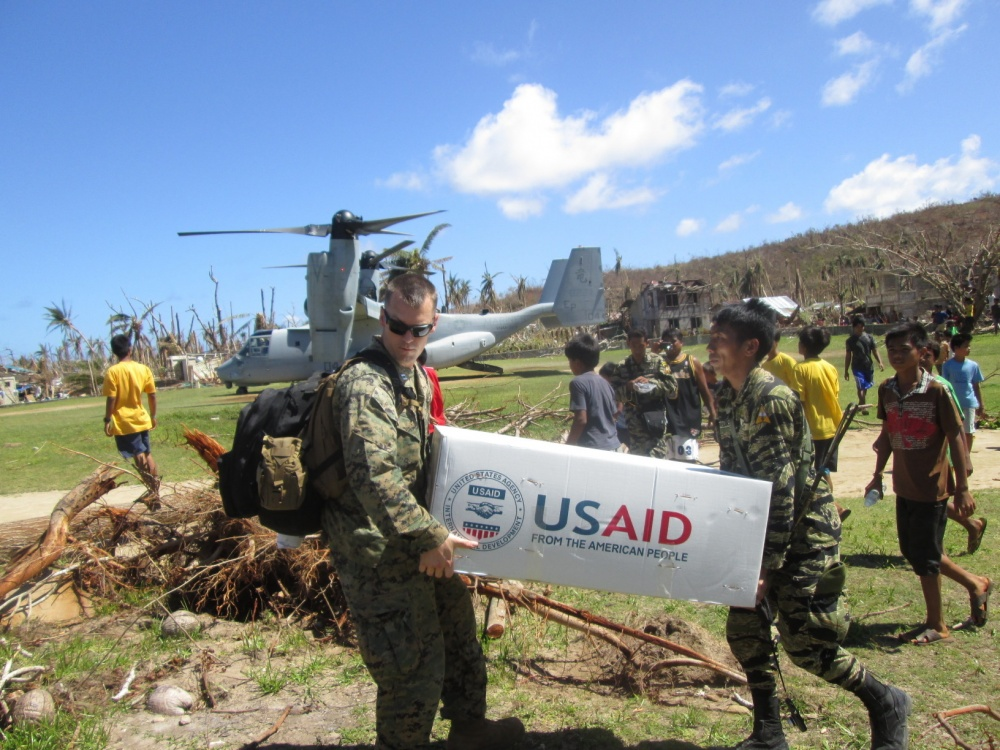
Marines deliver aide to the Philippines following Super Typhoon Haiyan

In November 2013, 3D MEB deployed to the Republic of the Philippines to support humanitarian assistance and disaster relief operations in the wake of Super Typhoon Haiyan (known locally as Yolanda) during Operation Damayan. More than 14 million people were affected by the super typhoon and 3D MEB was able to respond to the request of the Government of the Philippines within hours under the direction of USAID and the Office of Foreign Disaster Assistance. More than 2,000 tons of relief supplies were delivered using the Marine Corps’ MV-22 Osprey aircraft, and more than 20,000 victims were evacuated from affected areas around Tacloban.

Most recently in April and May 2015, 3D MEB deployed to Nepal for Operation Sahayogi Haat to aid victims of the magnitude 8.1 earthquake, which killed 9,000 people, injured 22,000, toppled buildings throughout the capital Kathmandu, and created numerous landslides and avalanches. The MEB deployed C-130s, MV-22 Ospreys and UH-1Y Venoms to deliver 115 tons of relief supplies and evacuate 75 people from isolated areas. On May 12, a UH-1Y Venom helicopter crashed while on a relief mission to an isolated area (2015 Charikot helicopter crash) killing all 13 people aboard, including Marine pilots and crew, two combat correspondents, and Nepalese soldiers and civilians.

Since reactivation in 2011, the MEB has participated in annual exercises in the region such as Ssang Yong and Balikatan. 3D MEB is always prepared to respond within 24 hours to crises throughout the region. In the event of a contingency, 3D MEB will mitigate foreign or domestic crises, protect U.S. citizens and territories, or counter threats to U.S. national interests as needed. In its current role, the 3d MEB serves as a permanent headquarters which can command forces of differing sizes and compositions. 3D MEB remains the resilient, ready and relevant crisis response force in the Indo-Asia-Pacific Region and is actively engaged in ongoing regional contingency planning as well as participating in numerous joint and combined exercises to increase regional security and stability.

== See also ==
NATO Symbol

3

- Marine Air-Ground Task Force
- Organization of the United States Marine Corps
