= List of United States Marine Corps aircraft wings =

This is a list of United States Marine Corps aircraft wings:

== Active ==
| Official Name | Insignia | Active | Headquarters |
|---|---|---|---|
| 1st Marine Aircraft Wing | | 7 July 1941 – Present | Marine Corps Air Station Futenma, Okinawa, Japan |
| 2nd Marine Aircraft Wing | | 10 July 1941 – Present | Marine Corps Air Station Cherry Point, North Carolina |
| 3rd Marine Aircraft Wing | | 10 November 1942 – 31 December 1945 1 February 1952 – Present | Marine Corps Air Station Miramar, California |
| 4th Marine Aircraft Wing | | 22 August 1942 – 26 March 1946 1 July 1962 – Present | 2000 Opelousas Avenue, New Orleans, Louisiana |

== Inactive ==
| Official Name | Insignia | Active | Headquarters |
|---|---|---|---|
| 9th Marine Aircraft Wing | | 1 April 1944 – 31 March 1946 | Marine Corps Air Station Cherry Point, North Carolina |

== See also ==
- List of United States Marine Corps divisions
- List of United States Marine Corps logistics groups
