= List of United States Marine Corps logistics groups =

This is a list of United States Marine Corps logistics groups:

Official Name	Insignia	Active	Headquarters
1st Marine Logistics Group		1 July 1947 – Present	Marine Corps Base Camp Pendleton California
2nd Marine Logistics Group		1 August 1944 – Present	Marine Corps Base Camp Lejeune North Carolina
3rd Marine Logistics Group		1 May 1958 – Present	Marine Corps Base Camp Smedley D. Butler Okinawa Prefecture, Japan
4th Marine Logistics Group		1 February 1966 – Present	2000 Opelousas Avenue, New Orleans Louisiana

== See also ==
- List of United States Marine Corps divisions
- List of United States Marine Corps aircraft wings
