= List of United States Marine Corps divisions =

This is a list of United States Marine Corps divisions.

== Active ==
Official Name	Insignia	Active	Headquarters
1st Marine Division		1 February 1941 – Present	Marine Corps Base Camp Pendleton; California
2nd Marine Division		1 February 1941 – Present	Marine Corps Base Camp Lejeune; North Carolina
3rd Marine Division		16 September 1942 – 28 December 1945; 7 January 1952 – Present	Marine Corps Base Camp Smedley D. Butler; Okinawa, Japan
4th Marine Division		16 August 1943 – 28 November 1945; 1 July 1962 – Present	2000 Opelousas Avenue, New Orleans; Louisiana

== Inactive ==
Official Name	Insignia	Active
5th Marine Division		11 November 1943 – 5 February 1946; 1 March 1966 – 26 November 1969
6th Marine Division		7 September 1944 – 1 April 1946

== See also ==
- United States Marine Corps Judge Advocate Division
- List of United States Marine Corps aircraft wings
- List of United States Marine Corps logistics groups
- List of 1st Marine Division Commanders
- List of 2nd Marine Division Commanders
- List of 3rd Marine Division Commanders
