= Fleet Marine Force, Pacific =

One of two maritime landing forces of the U.S. Marine Corps

- Active: 17 September 1944 – present
- Country: United States of America
- Type: maritime general and special purpose landing force
- Role: Amphibious warfare, expeditionary warfare
- Part of: United States Marine Corps; United States Navy
- Garrison/HQ: MCB Camp H.M. Smith, Hawaii, U.S.

Commanders
- Current commander: LtGen Roger B. Turner

The Fleet Marine Force, Pacific (FMFPAC) is the largest maritime landing force in the world. Its units are spread across the Pacific Ocean and reports to the United States Pacific Command. It is headquartered at MCB Camp H. M. Smith, HI and directs and commands all the subordinate elements of the Navy Expeditionary Strike Force and Marine Air-Ground Task Force components that follow under the 3rd, 5th, and 7th Fleet and the Marine Corps Forces, Pacific (MARFORPAC). The Commanding General of Marine Corps Forces, Pacific is dual-posted as the Commanding General of Fleet Marine Force, Pacific. FMFPAC is under operational control of the Commander, United States Pacific Fleet (COMPACFLT), when deployed.

FMFPAC was established by General 'Howling Mad' Smith in 1944 to assume command of very large Marine forces in the Pacific theatre of World War II, of the order of 500,000. Since then, the forces commanded by FMFPAC have been the largest field command in the Marine Corps, representing two-thirds of its combat strength.

== History ==
The provisional administrative headquarters of Fleet Marine Force, Pacific, was established on 12 June 1944 as the reformation of the V Amphibious Corps, and it formally was designated as Headquarters Fleet Marine Force, Pacific, on 17 September 1944. On 12 July of the same year, Holland Smith became Commanding General, Fleet Marine Force, Pacific, after being appointed by Admiral Chester Nimitz, the commander of the U.S. Pacific Fleet. The force grew to a strength of six divisions and five aircraft wings by the end of the war.

The preceding units of the Fleet Marine Force, Pacific, were mainly from the original Fleet Marine Force, established on 7 December 1933 by the Secretary of the Navy, Claude A. Swanson. It consisted of two brigades, one on the East Coast in Quantico, Virginia, and one on the West Coast in San Diego, California. In 1941 the Fleet Marine Force was reduced to a training command in the continental United States during the war, while two amphibious forces, one in the Atlantic and one in the Pacific, were created as field commands. In 1943 the Amphibious Corps, Pacific Fleet, became V Amphibious Corps. In the spring of 1944, the commander of V Amphibious Corps had his role expanded to cover the III Amphibious Corps as well, and this position developed into the Headquarters, Fleet Marine Force, Pacific, in September 1944. FMFPAC was created as a U.S. Navy type command responsible for organizing, training, and supporting Marine forces in the Pacific Fleet, as well as advising the Commander of the Pacific Fleet on all matters related to the Marine Corps. In December 1946, the Fleet Marine Force, Atlantic (FMFLANT) was created as the East Coast counterpart to FMFPAC.

FMF-PAC Insignia 1944-1946
Dog Platoon	Anti-Aircraft	Artillery	DUKW Company	Bomb Disposal	Engineers	Supply	AMTRAC

In July 1992, the Marine Corps established two service component commands to geographic unified combatant commands, including the U.S. Marine Corps Forces, Pacific (MARFORPAC). Since then, the Commander, MARFORPAC, has been dual-hatted as the Commanding General, FMFPAC.

Marine units from FMFPAC were deployed to China during the Chinese Civil War, and participated in the Korean War and the Vietnam War. It also sent units to fight in Iraq and Afghanistan, because before 2005 the area covered by the U.S. Central Command was in the jurisdiction of FMFPAC. The head of MARFORPAC and FMFPAC was also nominally the Commander, U.S. Marine Corps Forces Central Command (MARCENT), from 1992 until 2005, when that role was given to the commanding general, II Marine Expeditionary Force.

== Organization ==
Reporting directly to the Commanding General, Fleet Marine Force, Pacific (CG FMFPAC) are the Commanding Generals of two Marine Expeditionary Forces (I MEF and III MEF), the Commanding Generals of two Marine Expeditionary Brigades (1st MEB and 3rd MEB), and the Commanding Officers of four Marine Expeditionary Units (11th, 13th, 15th, and 31st MEUs).

The Commanding General, I MEF, exercises operational control over the 1st Marine Division, the 3rd Marine Aircraft Wing, and the 1st Marine Logistics Group, while the Commanding General, III MEF, exercises operational control over the 3d Marine Division, the 1st Marine Aircraft Wing, and the 3rd Marine Logistics Group.

== Hierarchy of Fleet Marine Force units ==
=== Commander, United States Pacific Fleet (COMPACFLT) ===
Camp H. M. Smith
Aiea, Hawaii

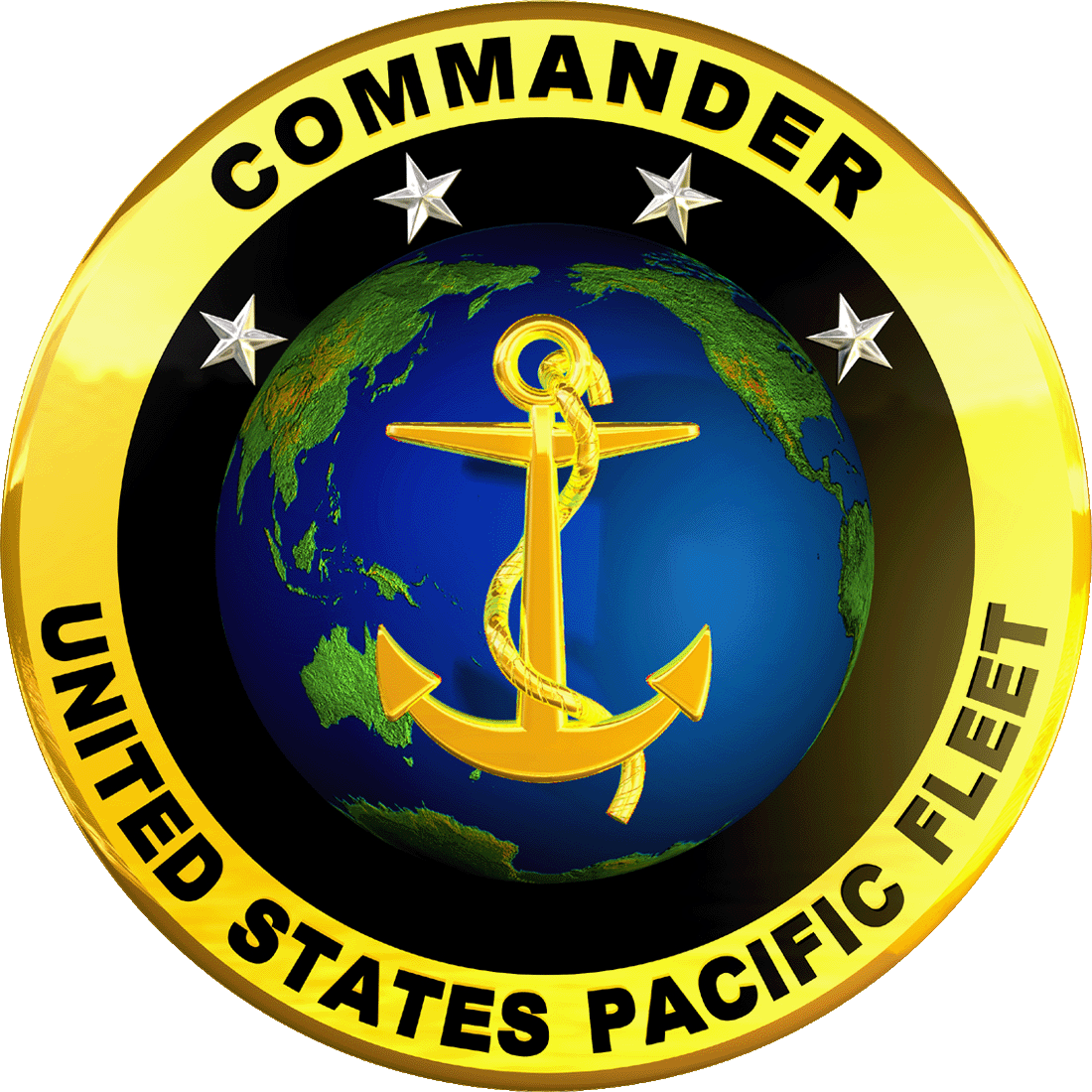

==== Marine Forces, Pacific (MARFORPAC) ====
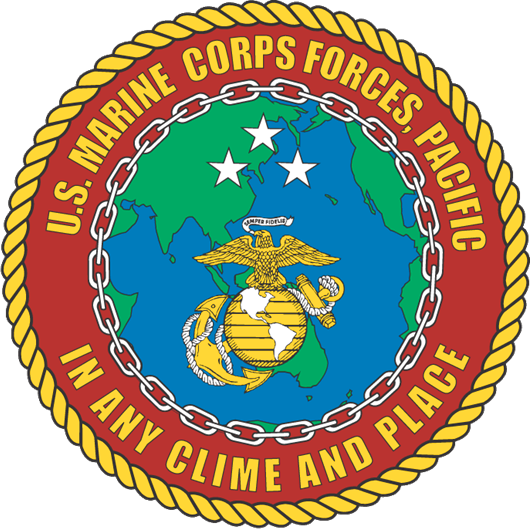

Landing Force, Third Fleet (LF3F)
Task Force 36	Naval Base Point Loma; San Diego, CA
Task Force 39	Naval Base Point Loma; San Diego, CA
I Marine Expeditionary Force	MCB Camp Pendleton; California, United States
III Marine Expeditionary Force	Camp Courtney; Okinawa, Japan

==== Marine Forces, Central (MARCENT) ====
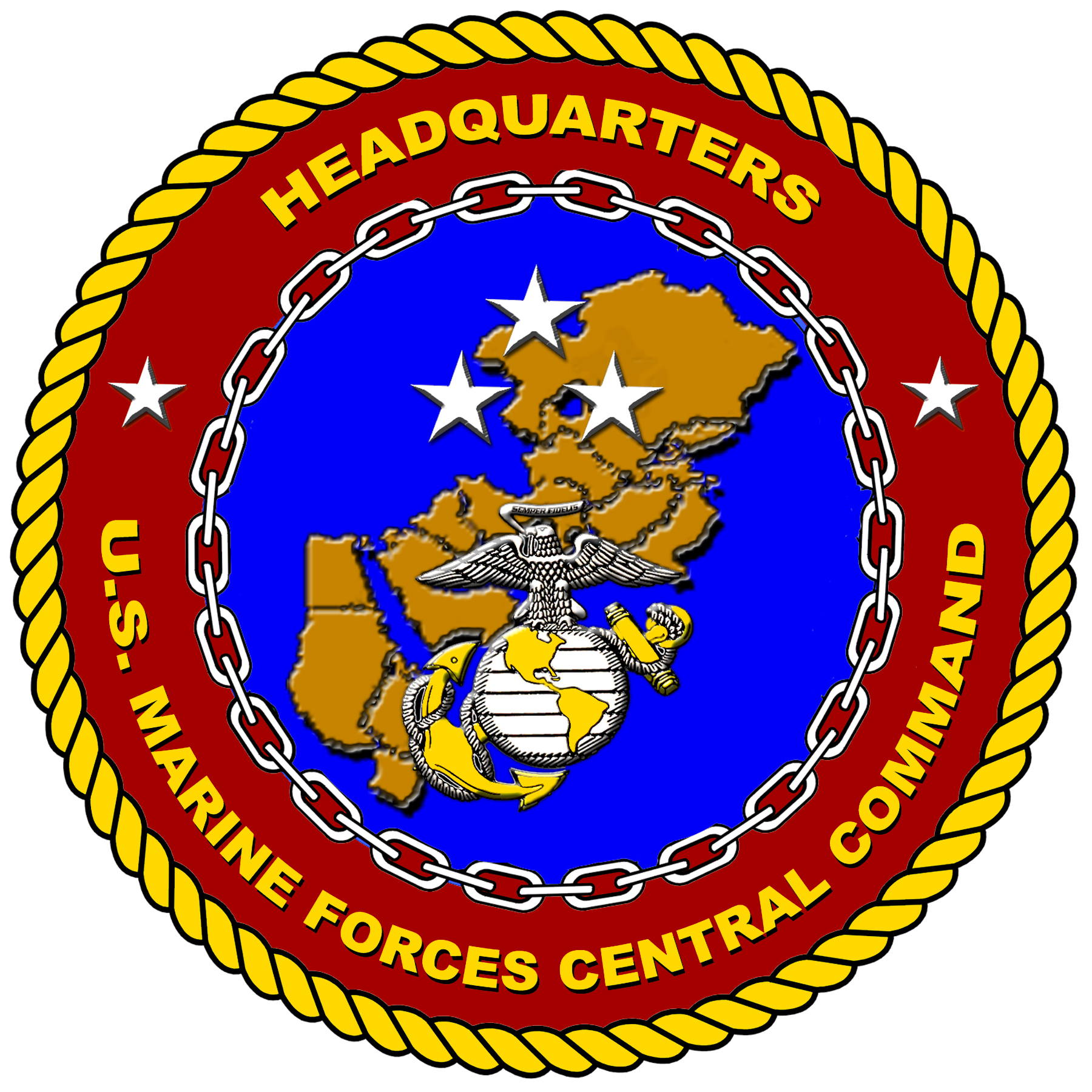

Landing Force, Fifth Fleet (LF5F)
Task Force 56	Naval Support Activity Bahrain; Kingdom of Bahrain
Task Force 59	Naval Support Activity Bahrain; Kingdom of Bahrain
I Marine Expeditionary Force	MCB Camp Pendleton; California, United States

==== Marine Forces, Korea (MARFORK) ====

Landing Force, Seventh Fleet (LF7F)
Task Force 76	U.S. Fleet Activities Yokosuka; Yokosuka, Japan
Task Force 79	U.S. Fleet Activities Yokosuka; Yokosuka, Japan
III Marine Expeditionary Force	Camp Courtney; Okinawa, Japan

== List of commanders ==
No.	Commander		Term			Ref
No.	Portrait	Name	Took office	Left office	Term length	Ref
Commanding General FMFPAC
1	Holland Smith	Lieutenant General; Holland Smith (1882–1967)	17 September 1944	3 July 1945	289 days	
2	Roy Geiger	Lieutenant General; Roy Geiger (1885–1947)	3 July 1945	15 November 1946	1 year, 135 days	
3	Allen Turnage	Lieutenant General; Allen Turnage (1891–1971)	15 November 1946	1 January 1948	1 year, 47 days	
4	Thomas E. Watson	Lieutenant General; Thomas E. Watson (1892–1966)	1 January 1948	1 July 1950	2 years, 181 days	
5	Lemuel C. Shepherd Jr.	Lieutenant General; Lemuel C. Shepherd Jr. (1896–1990)	1 July 1950	January 1952	1 year, 184 days	
6	Franklin A. Hart	Lieutenant General; Franklin A. Hart (1894–1967)	January 1952	1 August 1954	2 years, 212 days	
7	Robert H. Pepper	Lieutenant General; Robert H. Pepper (1895–1968)	1 August 1954	9 September 1955	1 year, 39 days	
8	William O. Brice	Lieutenant General; William O. Brice (1898–1972)	9 September 1955	1 September 1956	358 days	
9	Edwin A. Pollock	Lieutenant General; Edwin A. Pollock (1899–1982)	1 September 1956	10 December 1957	1 year, 100 days	
10	Vernon E. Megee	Lieutenant General; Vernon E. Megee (1900–1992)	10 December 1957	30 October 1959	1 year, 324 days	
11	Thomas Wornham	Lieutenant General; Thomas Wornham (1903–1984)	30 October 1959	1 April 1961	1 year, 153 days	
12	Alan Shapley	Lieutenant General; Alan Shapley (1903–1973)	1 April 1961	1 June 1962	1 year, 61 days	
13	Carson A. Roberts	Lieutenant General; Carson A. Roberts (1905–1983)	1 June 1962	1 March 1964	1 year, 274 days	
14	Victor Krulak	Lieutenant General; Victor Krulak (1913–2008)	1 March 1964	31 May 1968	4 years, 91 days	
15	Henry W. Buse Jr.	Lieutenant General; Henry W. Buse Jr. (1912–1988)	31 May 1968	1 July 1970	2 years, 31 days	
16	William K. Jones	Lieutenant General; William K. Jones (1916–1998)	1 July 1970	1 September 1972	2 years, 62 days	
17	Louis H. Wilson Jr.	Lieutenant General; Louis H. Wilson Jr. (1920–2005)	1 September 1972	May 1975	2 years, 212 days	
-	Thomas H. Miller	Major General; Thomas H. Miller (1923–2007); Acting	May 1975	August 1975	92 days	
18	John N. McLaughlin	Lieutenant General; John N. McLaughlin (1918–2002)	August 1975	1 July 1977	1 year, 334 days	
19	Leslie E. Brown	Lieutenant General; Leslie E. Brown (1920–1997)	1 July 1977	1 October 1978	1 year, 92 days	
20	Andrew W. O'Donnell Sr.	Lieutenant General; Andrew W. O'Donnell Sr. (1924–1997)	October 1978	30 June 1981	2 years, 272 days	
21	John K. Davis	Lieutenant General; John K. Davis (1927–2019)	30 June 1981	1 July 1983	2 years, 1 day	
22	Charles G. Cooper	Lieutenant General; Charles G. Cooper (1927–2009)	1 July 1983	31 July 1985	2 years, 30 days	
23	D'Wayne Gray	Lieutenant General; D'Wayne Gray (1932–2014)	31 July 1985	16 September 1987	2 years, 47 days	
-	Richard M. Cooke	Major General; Richard M. Cooke (1930–2019); Acting	16 September 1987	2 October 1987	16 days	
24	Edwin J. Godfrey	Lieutenant General; Edwin J. Godfrey (1932–2002)	2 October 1987	28 September 1989	1 year, 361 days	
25	Bob Milligan	Lieutenant General; Bob Milligan (born 1932)	28 September 1989	22 August 1991	1 year, 328 days	
26	Royal N. Moore Jr.	Lieutenant General; Royal N. Moore Jr. (born 1935)	22 August 1991	9 July 1992	322 days	
Commanding General FMFPAC / Commander MARFORPAC / Commander MARCENT
27	Hank Stackpole	Lieutenant General; Hank Stackpole (1935–2020)	9 July 1992	22 July 1994	1 year, 356 days	
28	Charles Krulak	Lieutenant General; Charles Krulak (born 1942)	22 July 1994	15 June 1995	342 days	
29	Jefferson D. Howell	Lieutenant General; Jefferson D. Howell	29 September 1995; Acting: 15 June 1995	7 May 1998	2 years, 220 days	
30	Carlton W. Fulford Jr.	Lieutenant General; Carlton W. Fulford Jr. (born 1944)	7 May 1998	22 June 1999	1 year, 46 days	
31	Frank Libutti	Lieutenant General; Frank Libutti (born 1945)	22 June 1999	16 August 2001	2 years, 55 days	
32	Earl B. Hailston	Lieutenant General; Earl B. Hailston (born 1947)	16 August 2001	1 August 2003	1 year, 350 days	
33	Wallace C. Gregson	Lieutenant General; Wallace C. Gregson (born 1946)	1 August 2003	5 August 2005	2 years, 4 days	
Commanding General FMFPAC / Commander MARFORPAC
34	John F. Goodman	Lieutenant General; John F. Goodman (born 1945)	5 August 2005	22 August 2008	3 years, 17 days	
35	Keith J. Stalder	Lieutenant General; Keith J. Stalder	23 August 2008	2 September 2010	2 years, 10 days	
36	Duane D. Thiessen	Lieutenant General; Duane D. Thiessen (born 1951)	2 September 2010	2 August 2012	~1 year, 335 days	
37	Terry G. Robling	Lieutenant General; Terry G. Robling	2 August 2012	15 August 2014	2 years, 13 days	
38	John A. Toolan	Lieutenant General; John A. Toolan (born 1954)	15 August 2014	26 August 2016	2 years, 11 days	
39	David H. Berger	Lieutenant General; David H. Berger (born 1959)	26 August 2016	8 August 2018	1 year, 347 days	
40	Lewis A. Craparotta	Lieutenant General; Lewis A. Craparotta (born 1960)	8 August 2018	16 July 2020	1 year, 343 days	
41	Steven R. Rudder	Lieutenant General; Steven R. Rudder (born c. 1962)	16 July 2020	7 September 2022	2 years, 53 days	
42	William M. Jurney	Lieutenant General; William M. Jurney	7 September 2022	12 September 2024	2 years, 5 days	
43	James F. Glynn	Lieutenant General; James F. Glynn	12 September 2024	12 August 2026	1 year, 334 days	
44	Roger B. Turner	Lieutenant General; Roger B. Turner	12 August 2026	Incumbent	45 days	

== See also ==
- Advanced Base Force
- Fleet Marine Force, Atlantic (FMFLANT)
- Marine Corps Forces, Pacific (MARFORPAC)
- Marine Corps Forces, Command (MARFORCOM) [formerly Marine Corps Forces, Atlantic (MARFORLANT)]
