= Bob Milligan =

United States Marine Corps general

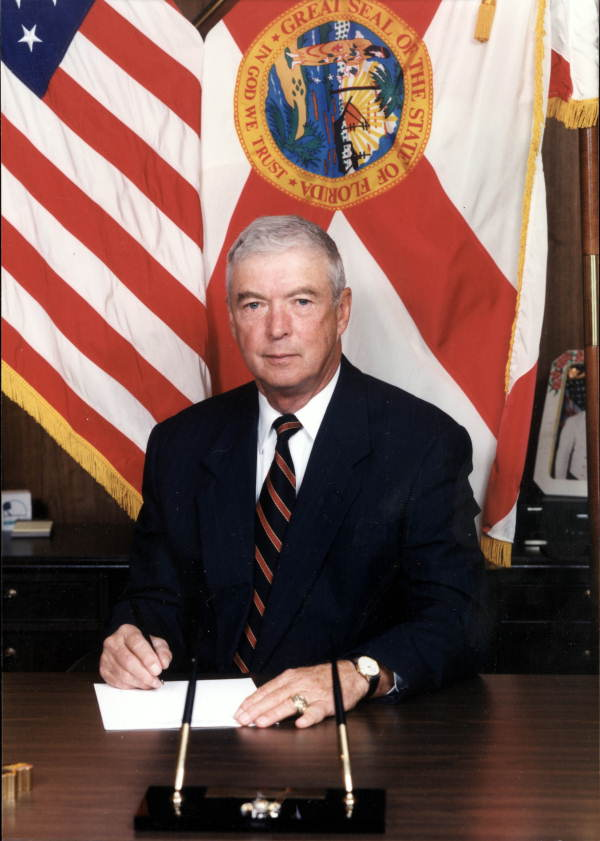
- Milligan in 1999

Florida State Comptroller
- In office January 3, 1995 – January 7, 2003

Personal details
- Born: December 12, 1932 (age 93) New Jersey, U.S.
- Party: Republican

Military service
- Allegiance: United States
- Branch/service: United States Marine Corps
- Years of service: 1956–1991
- Rank: Lieutenant general

Robert Frank Milligan (born December 12, 1932) is a retired lieutenant general in the United States Marine Corps who served as Commanding General of the Fleet Marine Force, Pacific. He is a graduate of the United States Naval Academy. After his retirement from the Marine Corps in 1991, he served as Comptroller of Florida from 1994 to 2002; director of the Department of Veterans Affairs, and member of the Florida Public Service Commission.

Milligan graduated from Matawan Regional High School in 1951 and was inducted into the school's hall of fame in 1997.

== Marine Corps career ==
He graduated from the U.S. Naval Academy and commissioned as a second lieutenant in the Marine Corps in June 1956. After completing The Basic School in May 1957, Milligan was an infantry officer at the 1st Marine Brigade, before returning to The Basic School as an instructor in June 1959. Between 1961 and 1964, he was part of the Marine Corps Reserve. After returning to active duty, Milligan was assigned to 1st Reconnaissance Battalion, 1st Marine Division. He went on to hold several staff positions at Headquarters Marine Corps. In September 1989, he became Commanding General, Fleet Marine Force, Pacific.

Party political offices
Preceded by Chris Comstock	Republican nominee for Florida Comptroller; 1994, 1998	Succeeded by None
Military offices
Preceded by Edwin J. Godfrey	Commanding General of Fleet Marine Force, Pacific; 1989–1991	Succeeded by Royal N. Moore Jr.
