= General Godfrey =

General Godfrey may refer to:

- Edward Settle Godfrey (1843–1932), U.S. Army brigadier general
- Edwin J. Godfrey (1932–2002), U.S. Marine Corps lieutenant general
- William Wellington Godfrey (1880–1952), Royal Marines general
