= Front line =

Position closest to the area of conflict

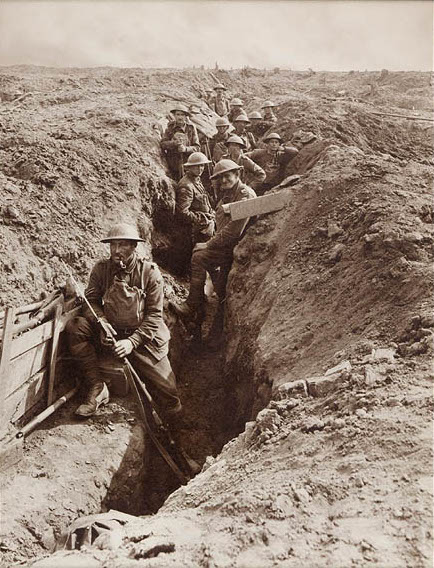
Australian soldiers in a front-line trench during World War I. Photograph taken by Capt. F. Hurley, sometime between August 1917 and August 1918.

A front line (alternatively front-line or frontline) is the point at which the most advanced tactical combat units intersect, creating an area of potential or actual conflict. Leaders have often fought at the front lines either purposefully or due to a collapse in battle formation. While a calculated risk, fighting on the front has in instances reduced communication, and heightened morale. The front is in direct contrast to the rear, which is the position furthest from conflict.

All branches of the United States Armed Forces use the related technical terms, Forward Line of Own Troops (FLOT) and Forward Edge of Battle Area (FEBA). These terms are used as battlespace control measures that designate the forward-most friendly maritime or land forces on the battlefield at a given point in time during an armed conflict. FLOT/FEBA may include covering and screening forces. The Forward Line of Enemy Troops (FLET) is the FEBA from the enemy's perspective.

== Etymology ==
Although the term "front line" first appeared in the 1520s, it took until 1842 for it to be used in the military sense. Its first use as an adjective was from 1915.

The word "front" gained the military sense of "foremost part of an army" in the mid-14th century, which, in turn, led the word to take on the meaning "field of operations in contact with the enemy" in the 1660s. That sense led to the phrase home front, which first appeared in 1919.

The attributive adjective version of the term front line (as in "our front-line personnel") describes materiel or personnel intended for or actively in forward use: at sea, on land or in the air: at the front line.

== Evolution of the concept ==
In the land campaigns of World War I, FEBAs, FLOTs and FLETs could often be identified by eye. For example, in France and Belgium, they were defined by opposing defensive trench systems.

Typical modern conflicts are vastly different, characterised by "war amongst the people", the concept of a "Three Block War", and the presence of an asymmetric threat from irregular or terrorist combatants. In those cases, the concepts of front line, FEBA, FLOT and FLET may be of little relevance. The term "front line" has come to refer more to any place where bullets and bombs are flying or are likely to fly.

With the start of the Russo-Ukrainian war in 2022, "front-line" has somewhat regained its definition as the static positions of two opposing sides. This resulting from the adoption of trenched positions by both Russians and Ukrainians, which has seen the separation between the two become clearly defined, with exchanges of territory becoming rarer.

== See also ==
- Area of responsibility
- Command and control
- Fog of war
- Front (military)
- List of command and control abbreviations
- Network-centric warfare
- Rear (military)
- Salient (military)
