= Hank Stackpole =

U.S. Marine Corps lieutenant general

H. C. Stackpole III
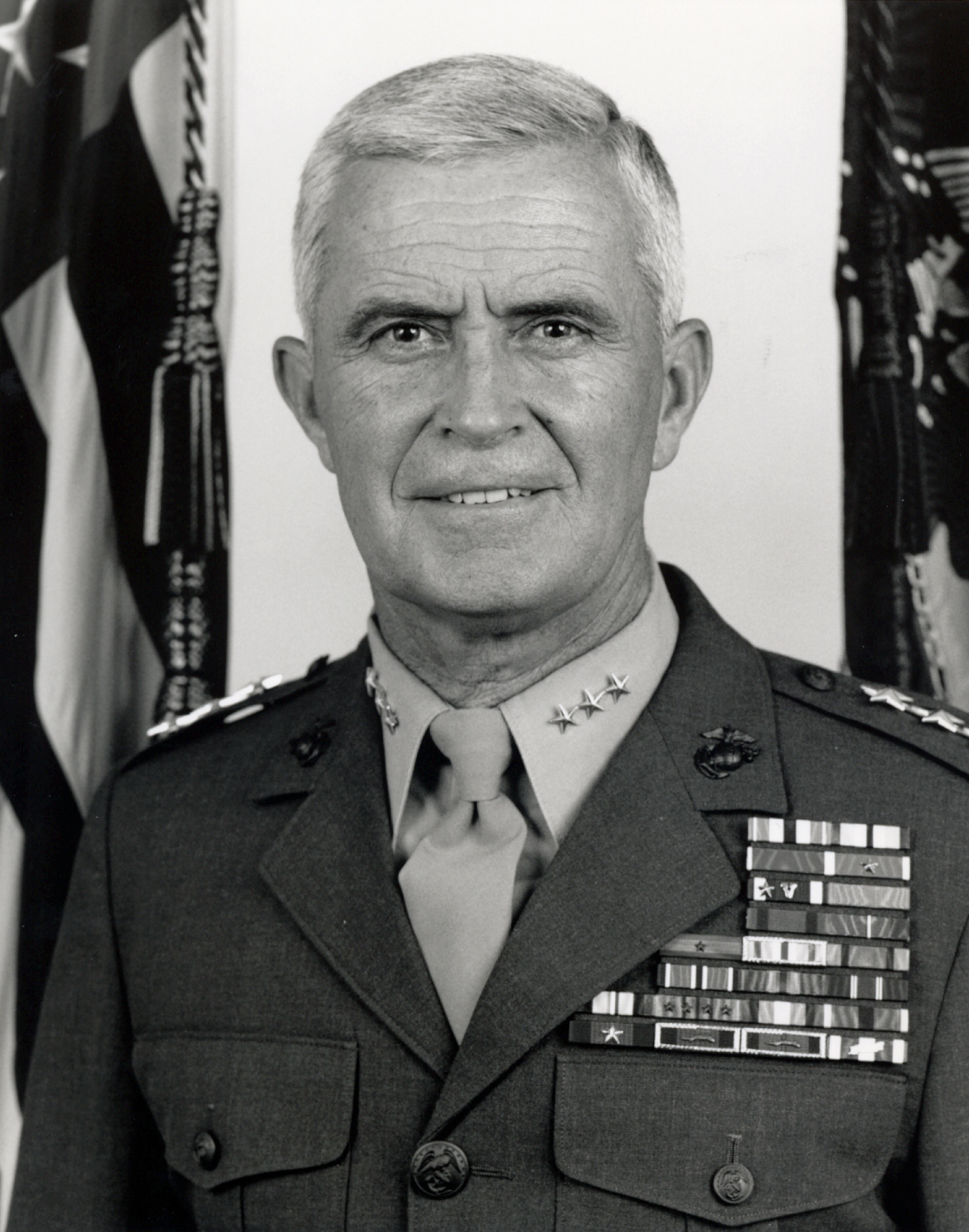
- Born: Henry Charles Stackpole III; May 7, 1935; New Haven, Connecticut, U.S.
- Died: May 29, 2020 (aged 85); Honolulu, Hawaii, U.S.
- Education: Princeton University (BA); George Washington University; Stanford University
- Military career
- Allegiance: United States
- Branch: United States Marine Corps
- Service years: 1958–1994
- Rank: Lieutenant general
- Service number: 0-76572
- Commands: Fleet Marine Force, Pacific / U.S. Marine Corps Forces, Pacific; III Marine Expeditionary Force; 3rd Marine Division; 7th Marine Regiment
- Conflicts: Vietnam War

Henry Charles Stackpole III (7 May 1935 – 29 May 2020) was a United States Marine Corps lieutenant general. He was a combat veteran of the Vietnam War and his last post was as commander, Marine Corps Forces, Pacific, and commanding general, Fleet Marine Force, Pacific, from 1992 to 1994.

== Early life and education ==
Hank Stackpole was a graduate of Notre Dame High School in West Haven, Connecticut. He graduated from Princeton University with a B.A. in English in 1957, and held master's degrees from George Washington University and Stanford University. He was commissioned as a second lieutenant in the United States Marine Corps in 1958.

== Marine Corps career ==
After commissioning, he was a combat engineer officer and a base public affairs officer. In 1964 Stackpole served in Da Nang, South Vietnam, and returned in 1966 as a captain in the role of company commander, Company I, 3rd Battalion, 5th Marines, 1st Marine Division in South Vietnam. When his unit ran into a North Vietnamese regimental headquarters, he was hit in the leg by a .50 caliber bullet. He was supposed to be evacuated by a helicopter to a field hospital, but the helicopter was shot down along the way and Stackpole was the only survivor among the nine men on board. He crawled out and carried himself seventy feet from the helicopter shortly before it exploded. He was eventually put on another helicopter and taken to a field hospital, where he nearly died from his injury.

During some of his time at the field hospital Stackpole was assisted by a Navy chaplain, Reverend Victor Krulak (the son of Marine Corps lieutenant general Victor H. Krulak). Because there seemed to be no sign of life, he started giving him the last rites, but he then noticed that Stackpole was still alive, and called over the Navy hospital corpsmen who had thought he was dead. Stackpole was awarded the Silver Star for his actions during combat in Vietnam.

From August 1970 to June 1973, Stackpole was assigned as commanding officer, executive officer and marine officer instructor, Naval Reserve Officers Training Corps (NROTC) Unit, Stanford University, and held the rank of major. He was awarded the Legion of Merit during that time for having the leading role in deescalating tensions between certain student groups and the NROTC unit, which became a target for those who were opposed to U.S. foreign policy.

As a colonel, he was commanding officer of 7th Marine Regiment from 7 August 1981 to 16 February 1983. Stackpole's other commands during his career included the Recruit Training Regiment at Marine Corps Recruit Depot San Diego, the 17th Marine Amphibious Unit, Marine Corps Base Camp Smedley D. Butler, Marine Corps Bases Japan, 3rd Marine Division, and III Marine Expeditionary Force.

Other commands he held included Joint Task Force Sea Angel during the humanitarian relief mission in Bangladesh in May and June 1991, after flooding on the eastern coast of the Bay of Bengal, and Director of the Plans and Policy Directorate, United States Atlantic Command, Norfolk, Virginia. Stackpole was promoted to the rank of lieutenant general on 23 July 1991 and was deputy chief of staff for plans, policies and operations, Headquarters Marine Corps in Washington, D.C., followed by assignment as commander of Marine Forces Pacific and Fleet Marine Force, Pacific, at Camp Smith in Hawaii from 8 July 1992. He was the first commander of Marine Forces Pacific, which was established as the Marine component command of the United States Pacific Command. In that role, Stackpole oversaw two of the Corps' three Marine Expeditionary Forces and had an area of responsibility that covers over half of the earth's surface. That was his last post before he retired on 1 September 1994.

His military decorations included the Defense Superior Service Medal, Silver Star, Legion of Merit, Purple Heart, the Japanese Order of the Rising Sun, and the South Vietnamese Gallantry Cross.

== Family and later life ==
Stackpole worked for a satellite communications company and was the president of the Asia-Pacific Center for Security Studies from 1998 to 2005. In his role as president of APCSS, he was "tremendously influential throughout the region. He had great stature there due to his near-legendary reputation, gracious personality, and expansive knowledge of the region and its people." He was also a commissioner of the Boy Scouts and a member of the American Red Cross. Even after his retirement from the military he continued to attend ceremonial events at the Marine Corps Forces, Pacific, such as the Marine Corps birthday ball.

He was married to Vivien Jean To, a native of Hong Kong, since 1962, and they had two daughters, one son, and four grandchildren.

Stackpole died on 29 May 2020 in Hawaii.

Military offices
Preceded by Norman H. Smith	Commander of the 3rd Marine Division; 1989–1991	Succeeded by Michael Byron
New office	Commander of the United States Marine Corps Forces, Pacific; 1992–1994	Succeeded by Charles Krulak
Preceded by Royal N. Moore Jr.	Commanding General of the Fleet Marine Force, Pacific; 1992–1994	Succeeded by Charles Krulak
