= Daniel Yoo =

Daniel Yoo may refer to:

- Daniel Yoo (tennis), South Korean former tennis player
- Daniel Yoo (general), Korean-American retired major general for the US Marine Corps
