= David Ottignon =

U.S. Marine Corps general

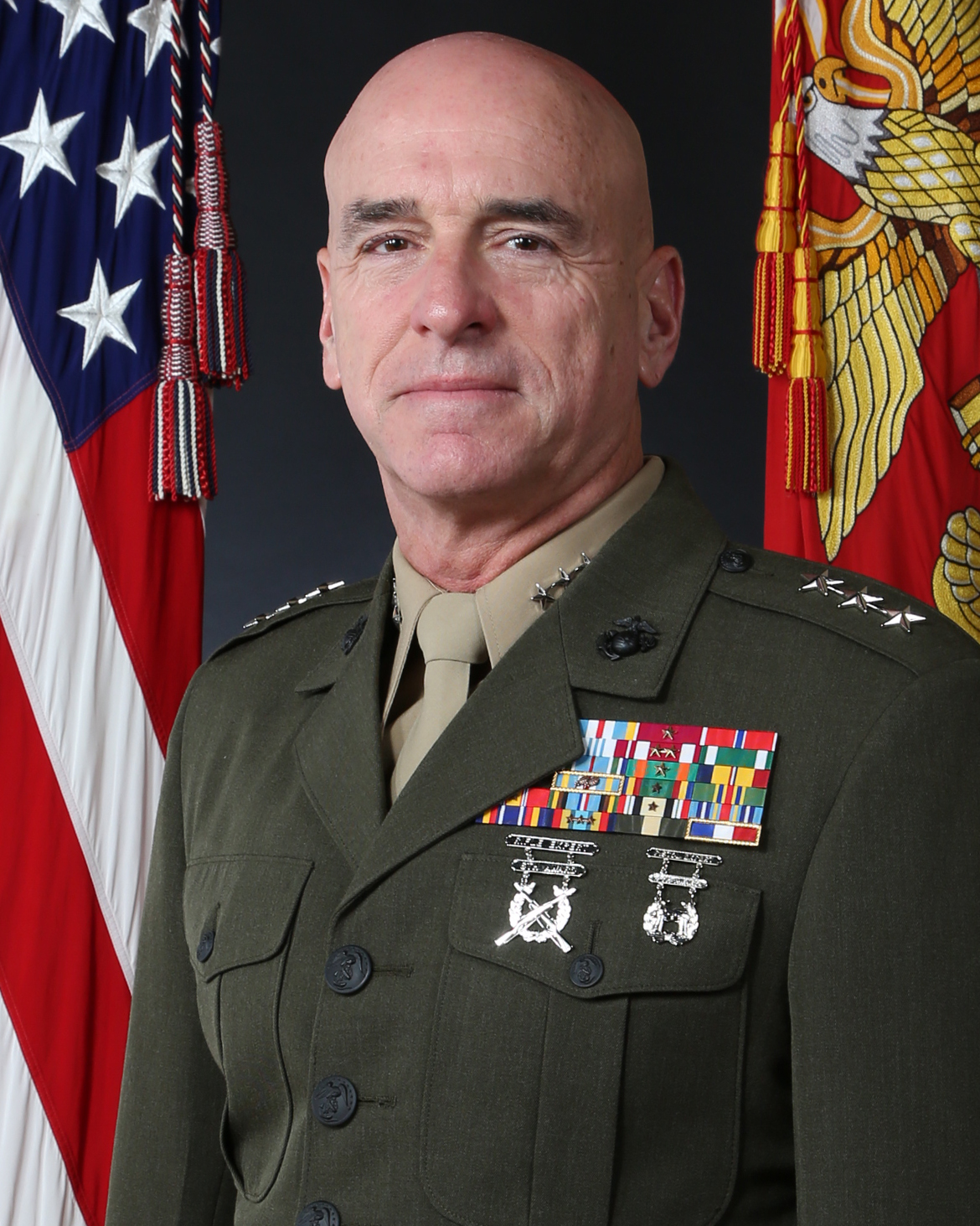
- Military career
- Allegiance: United States
- Branch: United States Marine Corps
- Service years: 1987–2024
- Rank: Lieutenant General
- Commands: II Marine Expeditionary Force; 1st Marine Logistics Group; 1st Marine Logistics Group; 2nd Combat Engineer Battalion
- Conflicts: Operation Restore Hope; Iraq War
- Awards: Defense Superior Service Medal; Legion of Merit (2); Bronze Star Medal

David A. Ottignon is a retired United States Marine Corps lieutenant general who last served as the Commanding General of II Marine Expeditionary Force from 2022 to 2024. He previously served as the Deputy Commandant for Manpower & Reserve Affairs of the United States Marine Corps. Previously, he was the Director of Manpower Management.

Military offices
Preceded by Vincent A. Coglinese	Commanding General of the 1st Marine Logistics Group; 2015–2017	Succeeded by Stephen D. Sklenka
Preceded by Vincent A. Coglinese	Inspector General of the United States Marine Corps; 2017–2019	Succeeded by James W. Lukeman
Preceded by Michael A. Rocco	Deputy Commandant for Manpower and Reserve Affairs; 2020–2022	Succeeded by James F. Glynn
Preceded by William M. Jurney	Commanding General of the II Marine Expeditionary Force; 2022–2024	Succeeded by Calvert L. Worth Jr.
