= United States Marine Corps Forces, Pacific =

Service component command of U.S. Marine Corps

Marine Forces Pacific
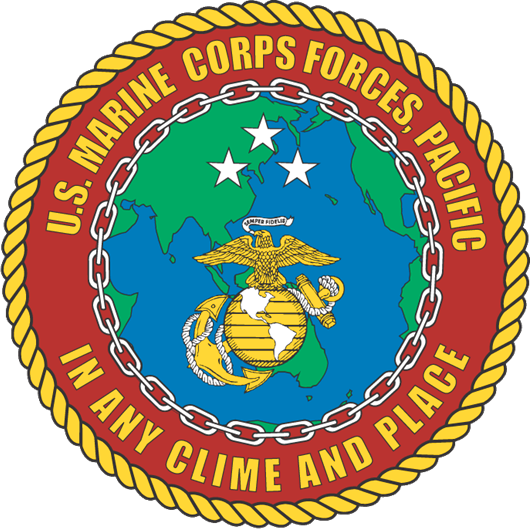
- MARFORPAC insignia
- Founded: 31 July 1992
- Country: United States
- Branch: United States Marine Corps
- Size: 84,000 Marines and sailors
- Part of: United States Pacific Command
- Garrison/HQ: Camp H. M. Smith
- Mottos: "In Any Clime and Place!"
- Colors: Marine Corps Colors
- Website: marforpac.marines.mil

Commanders
- Commander: LtGen Roger B. Turner
- Deputy Commander: MajGen Matthew T. Mowery
- Colonel of the Regiment: SgtMaj Joy M. Kitashima

The U.S. Marine Corps Forces, Pacific (MARFORPAC) is the Marine Corps service component command of U.S. Pacific Command (USPACOM). It is the largest field command in the Marine Corps and is headquartered at Camp H. M. Smith in Hawaii. The MARFORPAC area of responsibility covers more than half of the Earth's surface.

It is composed of the I Marine Expeditionary Force (I MEF) and the III Marine Expeditionary Force (III MEF). Each MEF comprises a command element (CE), a ground combat element (GCE) (1st and 3rd Marine Divisions), an aviation combat element (ACE) (1st and 3rd Marine Aircraft Wings), and a logistics combat element (LCE) (1st and 3rd Marine Logistics Groups).

== History ==
Although the U.S. Marine Corps has had units stationed in the Pacific region since World War II, Marine Corps Forces Pacific (MARFORPAC) was not established as a service component of Pacific Command until 31 July 1992. The Commander, Marine Forces Pacific, is dual-hatted as Commanding General, Fleet Marine Force Pacific, a position that existed since 1944. General Holland Smith, the first commander of Fleet Marine Force Pacific, established its headquarters in the summer of 1944 to lead over 500,000 Marines in the theater that were subordinated to the U.S. Pacific Fleet.

After its creation in 1992, MARFORPAC was initially one of only two Marine service component commands, along with Marine Corps Forces Atlantic. During the 1990s MARFORPAC commanded two-thirds of the combat units in the Marine Corps, totaling to over 80,000 Marines, and was responsible for providing forces to not only Pacific Command, but also to Central Command and the United States Forces Korea. Accordingly, the Commander of MARFORPAC was also the Commander of Marine Corps Forces Central Command (MARCENT) from the 1990s until it became a completely separate headquarters in 2005. In 2002, then-commander of Marine Forces Pacific, Earl B. Hailston, temporarily moved from Hawaii to the Arab states of the Persian Gulf to oversee operations in the Middle East. The expansion of MARCENT during the war on terror led to it being made a free standing headquarters under Central Command. Even after the removal of MARCENT from its area of responsibility, MARFORPAC remains the largest field command in the Marine Corps. A subordinate command for Marines in South Korea (Marine Corps Forces Korea or MARFORK) was also created in 1995, answering to MARFORPAC and U.S. Forces Korea.

== Organization ==
Marine Corps Forces Pacific consists of I Marine Expeditionary Force (I MEF) and III Marine Expeditionary Force (III MEF). According to the Commandant's Planning Guidance from 2019, I MEF will be designed to provide support to the U.S. Third Fleet while III MEF will provide support to the U.S. Seventh Fleet. U.S. Marines in South Korea have their own subordinate command, Marine Corps Forces Korea, that also answers to MARFORPAC, though it has no combat units assigned to it.

== List of commanders ==
No.	Commander		Term			Ref
No.	Portrait	Name	Took office	Left office	Term length	Ref
Commander MARFORPAC / Commander MARCENT / Commanding General FMFPAC
1	Hank Stackpole	Lieutenant General; Hank Stackpole (1935–2020)	8 July 1992	22 July 1994	2 years, 14 days	
2	Charles Krulak	Lieutenant General; Charles Krulak (born 1942)	22 July 1994	15 June 1995	342 days	
3	Jefferson D. Howell	Lieutenant General; Jefferson D. Howell	29 September 1995; Acting: 15 June 1995	7 May 1998	2 years, 220 days	
4	Carlton W. Fulford Jr.	Lieutenant General; Carlton W. Fulford Jr. (born 1944)	7 May 1998	22 June 1999	1 year, 46 days	
5	Frank Libutti	Lieutenant General; Frank Libutti (born 1945)	22 June 1999	16 August 2001	2 years, 55 days	
6	Earl B. Hailston	Lieutenant General; Earl B. Hailston (born 1947)	16 August 2001	1 August 2003	1 year, 350 days	
7	Wallace C. Gregson	Lieutenant General; Wallace C. Gregson (born 1946)	1 August 2003	5 August 2005	2 years, 4 days	
Commander MARFORPAC / Commanding General FMFPAC
8	John F. Goodman	Lieutenant General; John F. Goodman (born 1945)	5 August 2005	22 August 2008	3 years, 17 days	
9	Keith J. Stalder	Lieutenant General; Keith J. Stalder	23 August 2008	2 September 2010	2 years, 10 days	
10	Duane D. Thiessen	Lieutenant General; Duane D. Thiessen (born 1951)	2 September 2010	2 August 2012	~1 year, 335 days	
11	Terry G. Robling	Lieutenant General; Terry G. Robling	2 August 2012	15 August 2014	2 years, 13 days	
12	John A. Toolan	Lieutenant General; John A. Toolan (born 1954)	15 August 2014	26 August 2016	2 years, 11 days	
13	David H. Berger	Lieutenant General; David H. Berger (born 1959)	26 August 2016	8 August 2018	1 year, 347 days	
14	Lewis A. Craparotta	Lieutenant General; Lewis A. Craparotta (born 1960)	8 August 2018	16 July 2020	1 year, 343 days	
15	Steven R. Rudder	Lieutenant General; Steven R. Rudder (born c. 1962)	16 July 2020	7 September 2022	2 years, 53 days	
16	William M. Jurney	Lieutenant General; William M. Jurney	7 September 2022	12 September 2024	2 years, 5 days	
17	James F. Glynn	Lieutenant General; James F. Glynn	12 September 2024	11 August 2026	1 year, 333 days	
18	Roger B. Turner	Lieutenant General; Roger B. Turner	11 August 2026	Incumbent	4 days	

== See also ==
- United States Indo-Pacific Command
- U.S. Marine Forces Central Command
