= Richard A. Cody =

31st Vice Chief of Staff of the United States Army

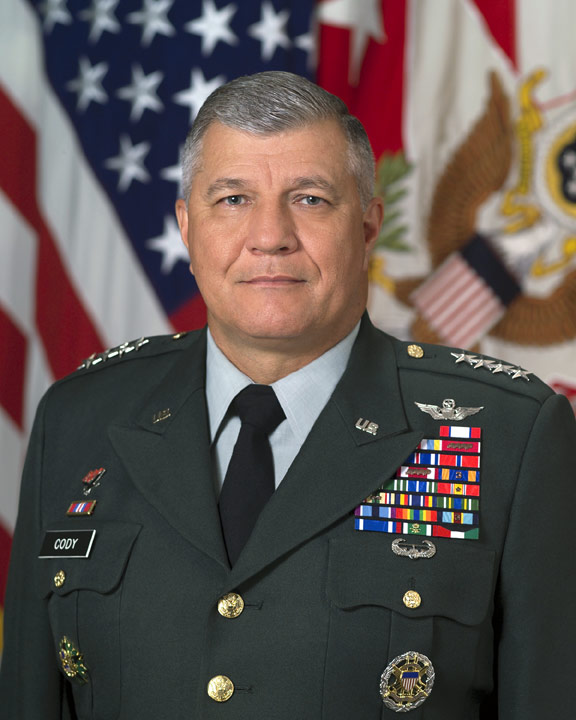
- General Richard A. Cody; Vice Chief of Staff of the United States Army
- Born: 2 August 1950 (age 76); Montpelier, Vermont, U.S.
- Military career
- Allegiance: United States
- Branch: United States Army
- Service years: 1972–2008
- Rank: General
- Nickname: Dick
- Commands: Vice Chief of Staff of the United States Army; 101st Airborne Division; 160th Special Operations Aviation Regiment (Airborne); 4th Brigade, 1st Cavalry Division; 1st Battalion, 101st Aviation Regiment
- Conflicts: Operation Desert Storm; Operation Enduring Freedom
- Awards: Distinguished Service Medal; Defense Superior Service Medal; Legion of Merit (5); Distinguished Flying Cross; Bronze Star; Meritorious Service Medal (5)
- Other work: Corporate Executive, L-3 Communications Holdings, Inc.

Richard Arthur "Dick" Cody (born 2 August 1950) is a retired United States Army general who served as the 31st Vice Chief of Staff of the United States Army from 24 June 2004 to 31 July 2008. He retired from the Army on 1 August 2008.

== Early life and career ==
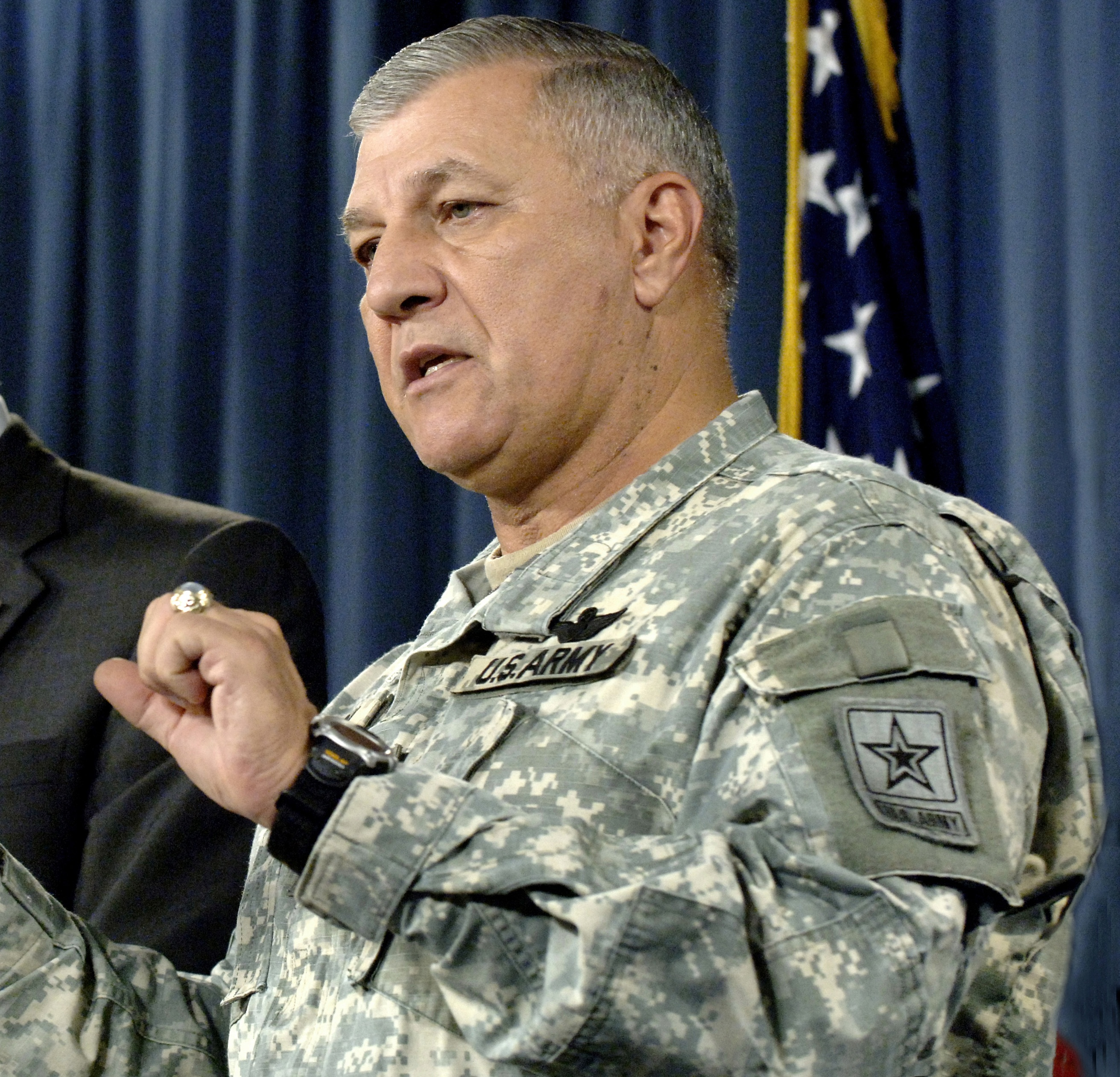
General Cody at a press conference in 2007

Cody was born in Montpelier, Vermont, on 2 August 1950. He was commissioned a second lieutenant upon graduation in 1972 from the United States Military Academy. His military education includes completion of the Transportation Corps Officer Basic and Advanced Courses; the Aviation Maintenance Officer Course; the AH-1, AH-64, AH-64D, UH-60, and MH-60K Aircraft Qualification Courses; the Command and General Staff College, and the United States Army War College. Cody is a Master Aviator with over 5,000 hours of flight time, and is an Air Assault School graduate.

Prior to serving as Vice Chief of Staff, Cody spent 32 years in a variety of command and staff assignments, including Deputy Chief of Staff for Operations (G-3) on the Headquarters, department of the Army staff. Other key assignments include Commanding General, 101st Airborne Division (Air Assault) and Fort Campbell; Director, Operations, Readiness and Mobilization, Office of the Deputy Chief of Staff for Operations and Plans, Headquarters, Department of the Army; Deputy Commanding General, Task Force Hawk, Tirana, Albania; Assistant Division Commander for Maneuver, 4th Infantry Division, Fort Hood, Texas; Commander, 160th Special Operations Aviation Regiment, Fort Campbell, Kentucky; Commander, 4th Brigade, 1st Cavalry Division; Aide-de-Camp to the Commanding General, Combined Field Army, Korea; and Director, Flight Concepts Division.

Cody served several tours with the 101st Airborne Division (Air Assault) as Commander, 1st Battalion, 101st Aviation Regiment (Attack) during Operation Desert Storm; Aviation Brigade Executive Officer, 101st Aviation Brigade; Battalion Executive Officer and Company Commander in the 229th Attack Helicopter Battalion, and Battalion S-3 in the 55th Attack Helicopter Battalion. He served as a platoon commander in the 2nd Squadron, 9th Cavalry, A Company (Attack), 24th Aviation Battalion and as Commander, E Company (AVIM), 24th Infantry Division, Fort Stewart, Georgia.

== Medals and awards ==
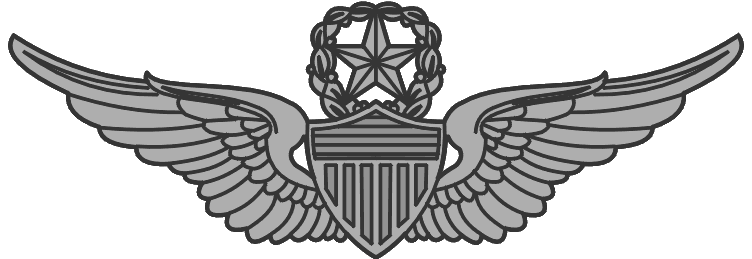
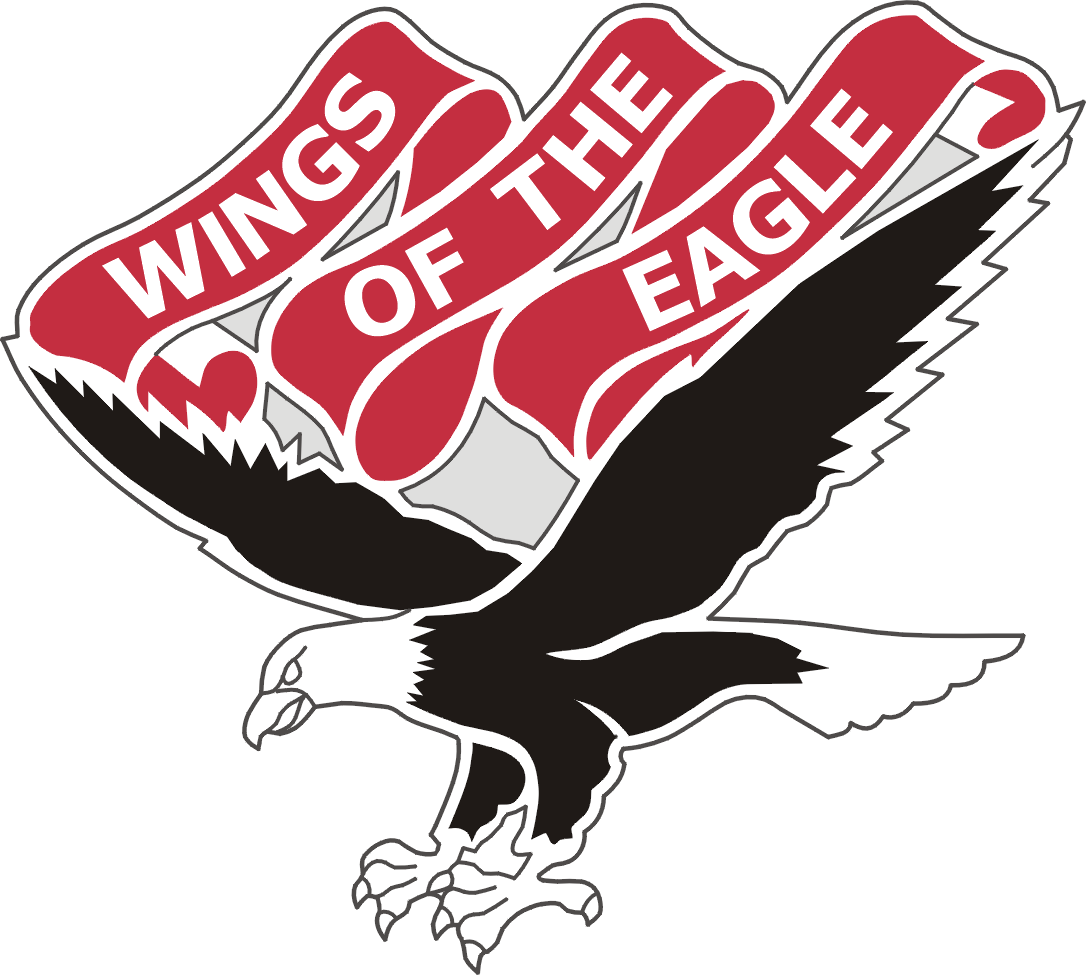
| Master Army Aviator Badge |
| Air Assault Badge |
| Joint Chiefs of Staff Identification Badge |
| Army Staff Identification Badge |
| 101st Aviation Regiment Distinctive Unit Insignia |

| Defense Distinguished Service Medal |
| Army Distinguished Service Medal |
| Defense Superior Service Medal |
| Legion of Merit (with 4 Oak Leaf Clusters) |
| Distinguished Flying Cross |
| Bronze Star |
| Meritorious Service Medal (with 4 Oak Leaf Clusters) |
| Air Medal (with Award numeral "3") |
| Army Commendation Medal (with 2 Oak Leaf Clusters) |
| Army Achievement Medal |
| Valorous Unit Award |
| National Defense Service Medal with Service star |
| Southwest Asia Service Medal with two bronze campaign stars |
| Global War on Terrorism Service Medal |
| Korea Defense Service Medal |
| Humanitarian Service Medal |
| Army Service Ribbon |
| Army Overseas Service Ribbon with bronze award numeral 3 |
| NATO Medal for Former Yugoslavia |
| Kuwait Liberation Medal (Saudi Arabia) |
| Kuwait Liberation Medal (Kuwait) |

== Post-army career ==
Cody joined L3 Technologies in 2008. As of 2017, he continued with L3 as Senior Vice President of Washington Operations. In 2013, he was appointed to the Board of Trustees of New York Institute of Technology in Old Westbury, New York.

General Cody serves as the chairman of the board for Homes For Our Troops, a 4 Star related 501c3 organization that builds mortgage free, specially adapted custom homes for severely wounded veterans of the Iraq and Afghanistan wars. Cody is a Trustee on the Board of the Intrepid Fallen Heroes Fund, a 4 Star rated 501c3 that has built and gifted back to the military the Center For the Intrepid Amputee Research and Treatment center at Brooke Army Medical Center, the National Intrepid Center For Excellence (NICOE) PTSD/mTBI research and treatment center at the Walter Reed National Military Medical Center and 3 of the planned 8 Intrepid Spirit satellite centers to the NICOE. He is also on the Advisory Council of Hope For The Warriors, a 4 Star rated 501c3 national non-profit, dedicated to provide a full cycle of non-medical care to combat wounded service members, their families, and families of the fallen from each military branch.

== Family ==
In 1975, Cody married Vicki Lyn Heavner in Burlington, Vermont. They have two sons, Clint and Tyler, who are active duty Army officers and Apache helicopter pilots. General Cody is of Lebanese heritage. Vicki has written a book about military life for military families. The military's largest Child Development Center (CDC) is named after the Codys. It is called the Cody Child Development Center, which is located on Fort Myer, Virginia. His nephew, John P. Cody, is also an active duty Army officer as an Orthopaedic Surgeon at Walter Reed National Military Medical Center.

Military offices
| Preceded by George W. Casey Jr. | Vice Chief of Staff of the United States Army; 24 June 2004 – 31 July 2008 | Succeeded by Peter W. Chiarelli |
