= Austin Renforth =

U.S. Marine Corps general

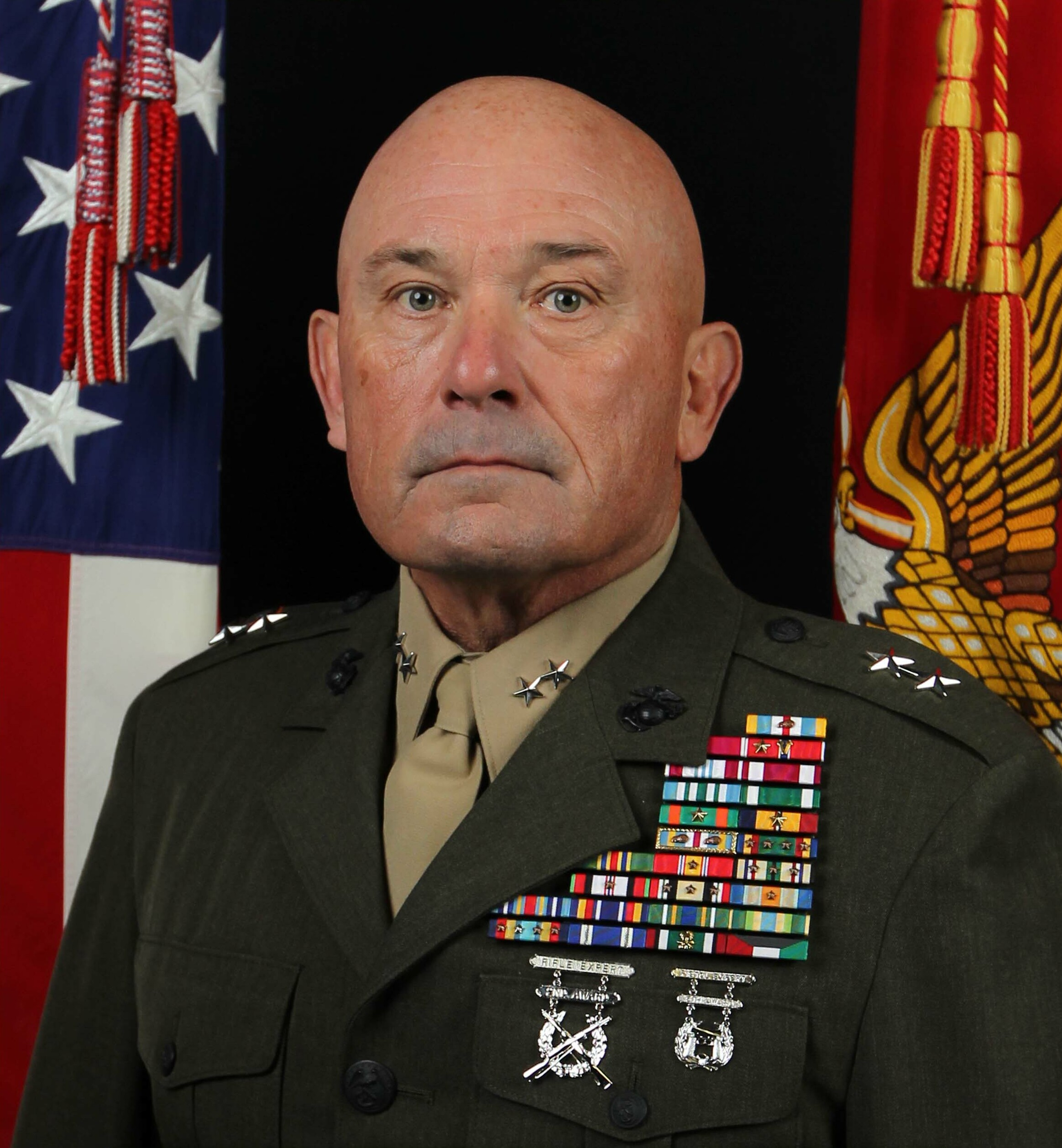
- Military career
- Allegiance: United States
- Branch: United States Marine Corps
- Service years: 1982–2023
- Rank: Major General
- Commands: Marine Air-Ground Task Force Training Command; Marine Corps Air Ground Combat Center Twentynine Palms; Marine Corps Recruit Depot Parris Island; Marine Corps Training Command; 7th Marine Regiment; Navy Sprint Football
- Conflicts: Gulf War; War in Afghanistan; Iraq War; Operation Inherent Resolve
- Awards: Defense Superior Service Medal (2); Legion of Merit; Bronze Star Medal (2)

Austin Eugene Renforth is a retired United States Marine Corps major general who last served as the Commanding General of the Marine Air-Ground Task Force Training Command and Marine Corps Air Ground Combat Center Twentynine Palms. He also served as the acting Chief of Staff of the North American Aerospace Defense Command and United States Northern Command. Renforth enlisted in the United States Navy in 1982 and was appointed to the United States Naval Academy in 1984. He graduated from the Naval Academy with a Bachelor of Science degree in mathematics in 1988.

Military offices
Preceded by Terry V. Williams	Commanding General of the Marine Corps Recruit Depot Parris Island and Eastern Recruiting Region; 2016–2018	Succeeded by James F. Glynn
Preceded by William Jurney	Commanding General of the Marine Air-Ground Task Force Training Command and Marine Corps Air Ground Combat Center Twentynine Palms; 2021–2023	Succeeded by Thomas B. Savage
