= Hope For The Warriors =

Hope For The Warriors CFC #27800
- Formation: 2006
- Type: 501(c)(3) corporation#20-5182295
- President/CEO: Robin Kelleher
- Staff: 35 full-time employees
- Website: http://www.hopeforthewarriors.org/

Hope For The Warriors is a national nonprofit organization in the United States that provides assistance to combat wounded service members, their families, and families of those killed in action. The organization focuses on those involved in Operation Iraqi Freedom and Operation Enduring Freedom and their families. Hope For The Warriors recently received a Four-Star Rating from Charity Navigator and was highlighted by George W. Bush in the Warrior Open.

== History ==
Hope For The Warriors was co-founded in 2006 by Robin Kelleher and Shannon Maxwell. They decided to found an advocacy group after Maxwell's husband, Tim Maxwell, was wounded in Iraq and suffered a traumatic brain injury (TBI). Hope For The Warriors provides aid to veterans in multiple forms, including building or refurbishing homes and providing professional development. It raises awareness of returning veterans by hosting Run For The Warriors in different areas of the United States, and by hosting athletes in Team Hope For The Warriors, who run or handcycle in the Marine Corps Marathon and the New York City Marathon or compete in triathlons, in order to raise money for the non-profit organization. Hope For The Warriors was a charity partner for both the 2011 Marine Corps Marathon and the 2011 New York City Marathon.

In December 2021, Hope For The Warriors opened the Steven A. Cohen Military Family Clinic in Jacksonville, North Carolina. The clinic provides mental-health and related support to veterans, military families, and active-duty personnel.

The programs in 2026, included four virtual workshops which included interviews, applicant-tracking systems, salary negotiations, and veteran recruitment.

=== Board members ===
The Hope For The Warriors website lists all of the nonprofit's board of directors. Some of the board members include Jack Marin, Captain Dan Moran, General Charles Krulak, General Richard Cody, Charlie Summers, and Gary Sinise.
