= James F. Glynn =

United States Marine Corps general

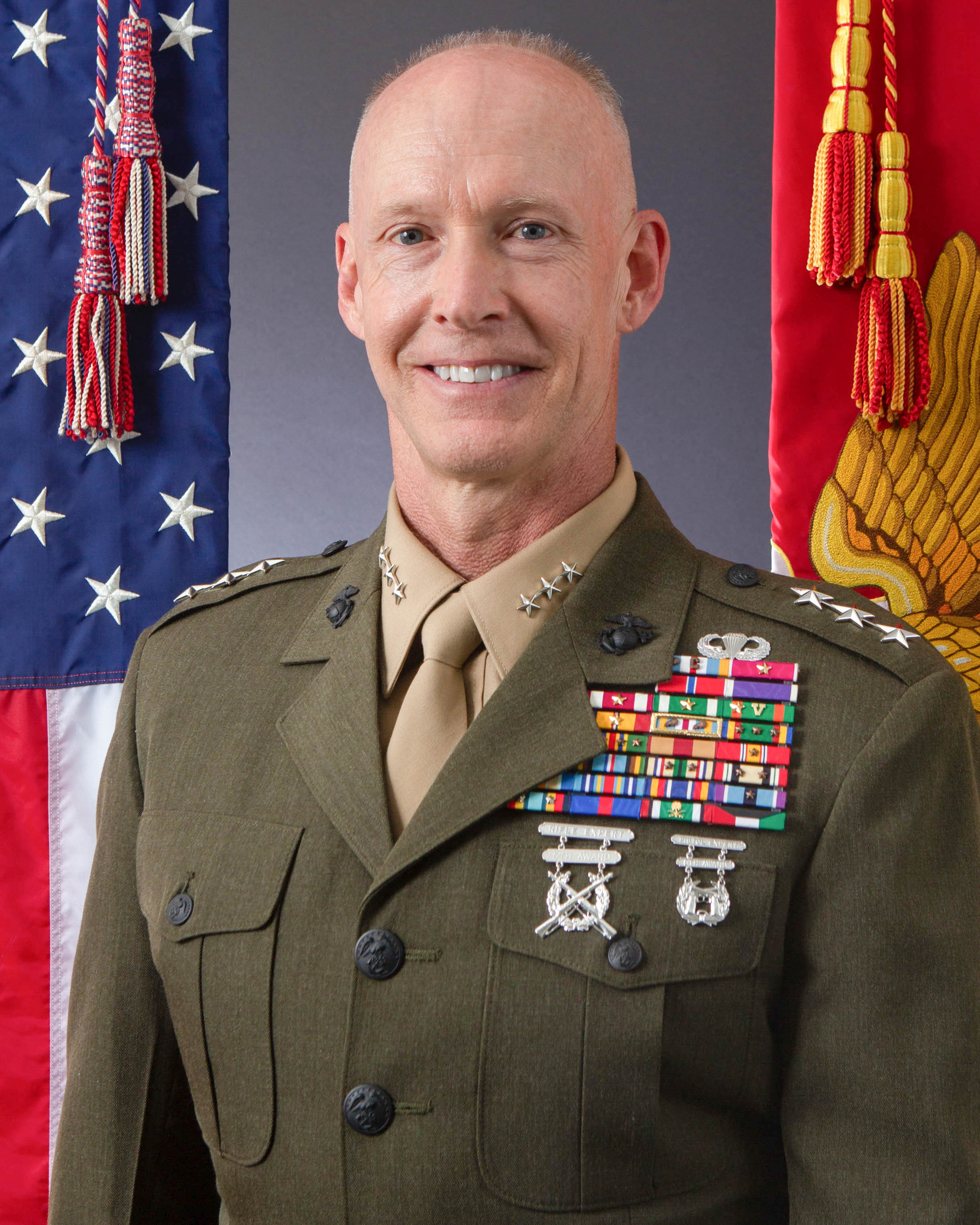
- Official portrait, 2024
- Born: Albany, New York, U.S.
- Education: United States Naval Academy (BS); Marine Corps Command and Staff College (MS); United States Army War College (MS)
- Military career
- Allegiance: United States
- Branch: United States Marine Corps
- Service years: 1989–2026
- Rank: Lieutenant General
- Commands: United States Marine Corps Forces, Pacific; Fleet Marine Force, Pacific; United States Marine Forces Special Operations Command; Marine Corps Recruit Depot Parris Island; Special Operations Joint Task Force, Operation Inherent Resolve (Forward); Marine Raider Training Center
- Conflicts: Gulf War; Iraq War; War against the Islamic State; Operation Inherent Resolve
- Awards: Defense Superior Service Medal (2); Legion of Merit (2); Bronze Star Medal; Purple Heart
- James F. Glynn's voice Glynn's opening statement at a House Armed Services subcommittee hearing on the 2023 military personnel posture Recorded 29 March 2023

James F. Glynn is an American retired lieutenant general who last served as the commander of United States Marine Corps Forces, Pacific, from 2024 to 2026. He previously served as the deputy commandant for manpower and reserve affairs of the Marine Corps from 2022 to 2024. He commanded United States Marine Corps Forces Special Operations Command from June 2020 to May 2022.

== Education ==
A native of Albany, New York, Glynn graduated with a Bachelor of Science degree in mechanical engineering in 1989 from United States Naval Academy. Glynn earned a Master of Science degree in National Security Affairs from the United States Army War College, a Master of Science degree in Military Studies from the Marine Corps Command and Staff College and is a graduate of the Marine Corps Amphibious Warfare School.

== Military career ==
Glynn was commissioned in the United States Marine Corps as a second lieutenant in 1989 following graduation from United States Naval Academy. Glynn graduated from The Basic School and the Infantry Officers Course, then reported to 3rd Battalion, 3rd Marines at Marine Corps Base Hawaii in Kaneohe where he served as a rifle platoon commander throughout Operations Desert Shield/Desert Storm and later as the 81 mm Mortar Platoon Commander. He has served staff billets at: Marine Barracks, Washington, D.C.; executive officer, 1st Battalion, 4th Marines, Camp Pendleton; Marine Corps Recruiting Station, San Antonio; G-3, Future Operations, 1st Marine Expeditionary Force and Director, Regional Operations (J3) Special Operations Command – Africa from May 2010 to July 2011. Glynn served in Iraq from 2006 to 2007 as the Battalion Landing Team Commanding Officer, 2nd Battalion, 4th Marines, 15th Marine Expeditionary Unit. As a colonel, Glynn served as commanding officer of the Marine Raider Training Center, formerly known as MARSOC Special Operations School, from July 2011 to July 2013.

Glynn's most recent assignments include: Military Assistant to the Assistant Commandant of the Marine Corps from July 2013 to August 2015 and then as the Director of the Office of U.S. Marine Corps Communication, Headquarters Marine Corps from Sept 2015 to Jun 2017; Deputy Commanding General of Special Operations Joint Task Force, Operation Inherent Resolve (Forward) from July 2017 to July 2018; Commanding General, Marine Corps Recruit Depot Parris Island and Eastern Recruiting Region and assumed duties as commanding officer of United States Marine Forces Special Operations Command on 26 June 2020. Following that, he became deputy commanding general of the United States Marine Corps Training and Education Command.

On 6 September 2022, Glynn was nominated for promotion to lieutenant general and assignment as deputy commandant for manpower and reserve affairs of the United States Marine Corps. His nomination was confirmed by voice vote of the Senate on 29 September 2022.

On 23 October 2023, it was reported that President Joe Biden sent a delegation of officers including Glynn to advise the Israel Defense Forces during the Gaza war, based on their expertise from fighting ISIS in Mosul.

In March 2024, Glynn was nominated for reappointment as lieutenant general and assignment as the commanding general of U.S. Marine Corps Forces, Pacific and Fleet Marine Force, Pacific. On 12 September 2024, he took command of MARFORPAC from Lt. Gen. William Jurney.

He relinquished command to Lt. Gen. Roger B. Turner on 12 August 2026, and retired from the Marine Corps on 18 September 2026.

=== Awards and decorations ===
U.S. military decorations
Defense Superior Service Medal with "C" device and one bronze oak leaf cluster
Legion of Merit with gold award star
Bronze Star Medal
Purple Heart
Meritorious Service Medal with gold award star
Navy and Marine Corps Commendation Medal with gold award star
Navy Achievement Medal with Combat Distinguishing Device and gold award star
Combat Action Ribbon with gold award star
Joint Meritorious Unit Award with oak leaf cluster
Navy Unit Commendation with three bronze service stars
Navy Meritorious Unit Commendation with three bronze service stars
U.S. Service (Campaign) Medals and Service and Training Ribbons
Marine Corps Expeditionary Medal
National Defense Service Medal with bronze service stars
Armed Forces Expeditionary Medal
Southwest Asia Service Medal with two bronze campaign stars
Iraq Campaign Medal with two bronze campaign stars
Inherent Resolve Campaign Medal with campaign star
Global War on Terrorism Expeditionary Medal
Global War on Terrorism Service Medal
Humanitarian Service Medal with bronze campaign stars
Navy Sea Service Deployment Ribbon with silver and bronze service stars
Marine Corps Recruiting Service Ribbon
Kuwait Liberation Medal (Saudi Arabia)
Kuwait Liberation Medal (Kuwait)

U.S. badges, patches and tabs
Parachutist Badge
Rifle Expert Badge
Pistol Expert Badge

Military offices
Preceded by Austin Renforth	Commanding General of the Marine Corps Recruit Depot Parris Island and Eastern Recruiting Region; 2018–2020	Succeeded by Julie L. Nethercot
Preceded by Daniel Yoo	Commanding General of the United States Marine Forces Special Operations Command; 2020–2022	Succeeded by Matthew G. Trollinger
Preceded by David A. Ottignon	Deputy Commandant for Manpower and Reserve Affairs; 2022–2024	Succeeded by Michael Borgschulte
Preceded by William Jurney	Commander of the United States Marine Corps Forces, Pacific; Commanding General of the Fleet Marine Force, Pacific; 2024–2026	Succeeded by Roger B. Turner
