= Norman H. Smith =

United States Marine Corps general (1933–2024)

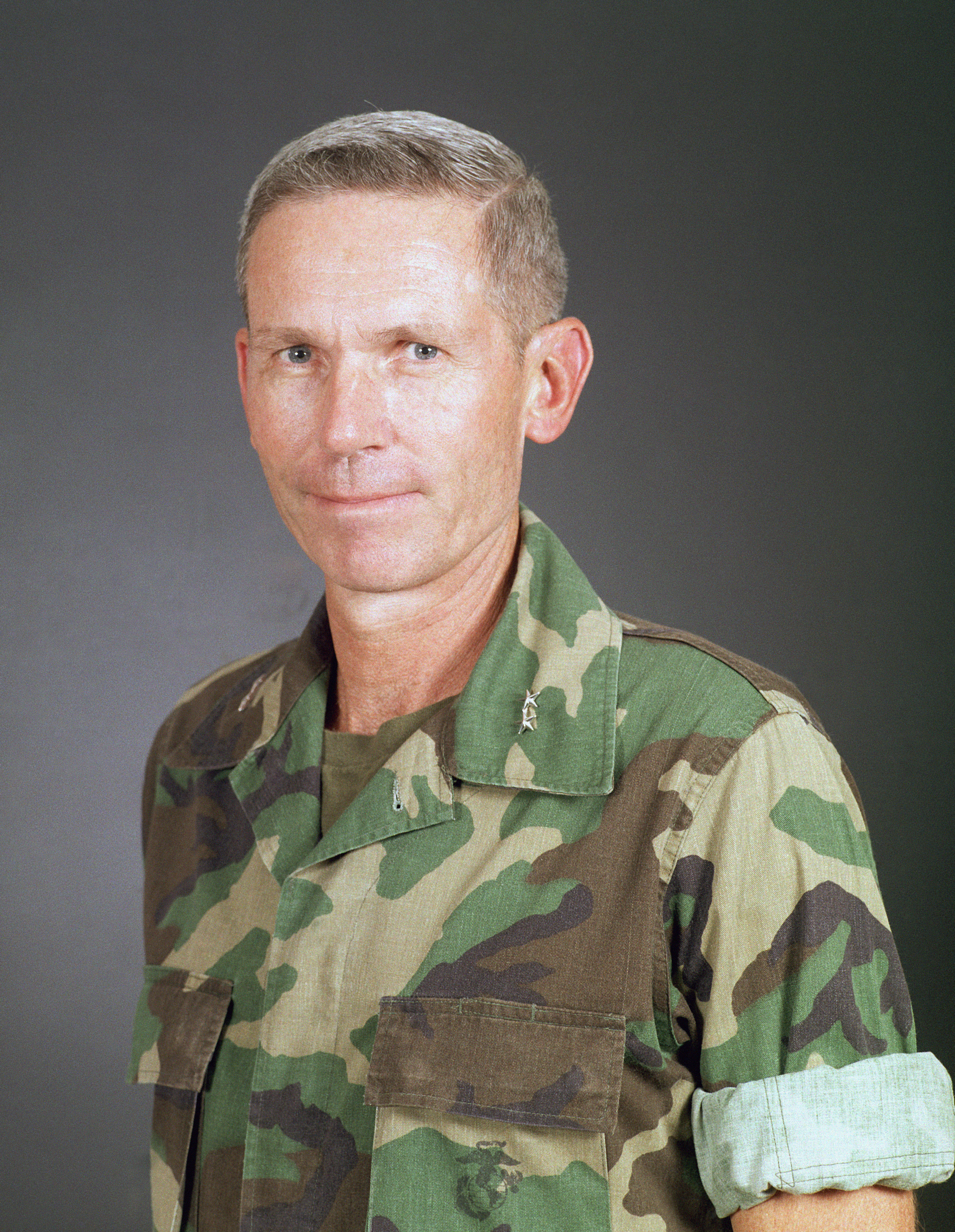
- Pictured in 1988 as a major general
- Born: 28 March 1933; Bucyrus, Ohio, U.S.
- Died: June 27, 2024 (aged 91); Front Royal, Virginia, U.S.
- Military career
- Allegiance: United States of America
- Branch: United States Marine Corps
- Service years: 1955–1991
- Rank: Lieutenant general
- Commands: 3rd Marine Division
- Awards: Legion of Merit

Norman H. Smith (March 28, 1933 – June 27, 2024) was an American U.S. Marine Corps lieutenant general who served as Deputy Chief of Staff for Manpower and Reserve Affairs from 1989 to 1991. He also served as commander of the 3rd Marine Division from 1987 to 1989. Smith was an alumnus of the University of Arkansas.

== Marine Corps career ==
Smith was commissioned a second lieutenant after completion of Officer Candidate School in December 1955. He graduated from the Basic School and his first assignment was with the 2nd Battalion, 1st Marines as platoon commander, company executive officer and company commander. His next assignment as executive officer, Marine Detachment USS Hancock in 1958 and 1959, then reported to the U.S. Naval Base, Roosevelt Roads, Puerto Rico for duty as Guard Officer. In 1962, he was assigned as company commander, 1st Battalion, 6th Marines and then as Assistant Battalion Operations Officer. In 1965, Smith reported to Military Assistance Command, Vietnam, for duty as Senior Advisor to the Army of the Republic of Vietnam 1st Division.

His staff assignments include Marine Officer Instructor, NROTC Unit, The Ohio State University from 1966 to 1969; Assistant Operations Officer, G-3, 5th Marine Division, Camp Pendleton; Assistant Operations Officer, G-3, 1st Marine Division, Southeast Asia; executive Officer, 3/1. As a major, Smith assumed command of 3rd Battalion, 1st Marines. After relinquishing command of 3/1, Smith reported to Marine Corps Command and Staff College at Quantico, graduating in 1972, then received assignment as assistant director, Marine Corps Physical Fitness Academy at Quantico, where he was promoted to lieutenant colonel on 1 July 1972. He transferred to Inspector-Instructor, 3rd Battalion, 25th Marines, 4th Marine Division. He next attended the Air War College at Maxwell Air Force Base, Alabama, graduating with distinction. Smith reported to Headquarters Marine Corps, Washington, D.C., in 1976 and performed duties as Action Officer, Service Planner, and deputy director of Plans Division, Plans and Policies Department. While serving in this assignment he was promoted to colonel on 1 July 1978. Smith then transferred to USS Puget Sound as Fleet Marine Officer on the Staff of Commander, U.S. Sixth Fleet.

Smith was selected in February 1982 for promotion to brigadier general. He was assigned duty as the Assistant Division Commander, 2nd Marine Division, Camp Lejeune, North Carolina. Smith was the Commanding General, Landing Force Training Command, Atlantic/Commanding General, 4th Marine Amphibious Brigade from June 1983 to June 1984. Smith was promoted to major general in July 1985. He was assigned the duties as Director, Plans and Policy Directorate, USCINCLANT, Norfolk, Virginia. In 1987, Smith was assigned as the Commanding General, III MEF/Commanding General, 3rd Marine Division. Smith relinquished command to major general Henry C. Stackpole III on September 30, 1989. His final assignment was as Deputy Chief of Staff for Manpower and Reserve Affairs, Headquarters Marine Corps from November 1989 to August 1991. He retired from the Marine Corps on 1 August 1991.

== Later life ==
In 2013 Smith joined the Iwo Jima Association of America serving as the organization's president before later becoming chairman of the board of directors. He visited Iwo Jima and spoke annually at the Reunion of Honor ceremony held on the island while serving as president of the organization. Smith died on June 27, 2024 at the age of 91.
