= Charles C. Krulak =

United States Marine Corps general

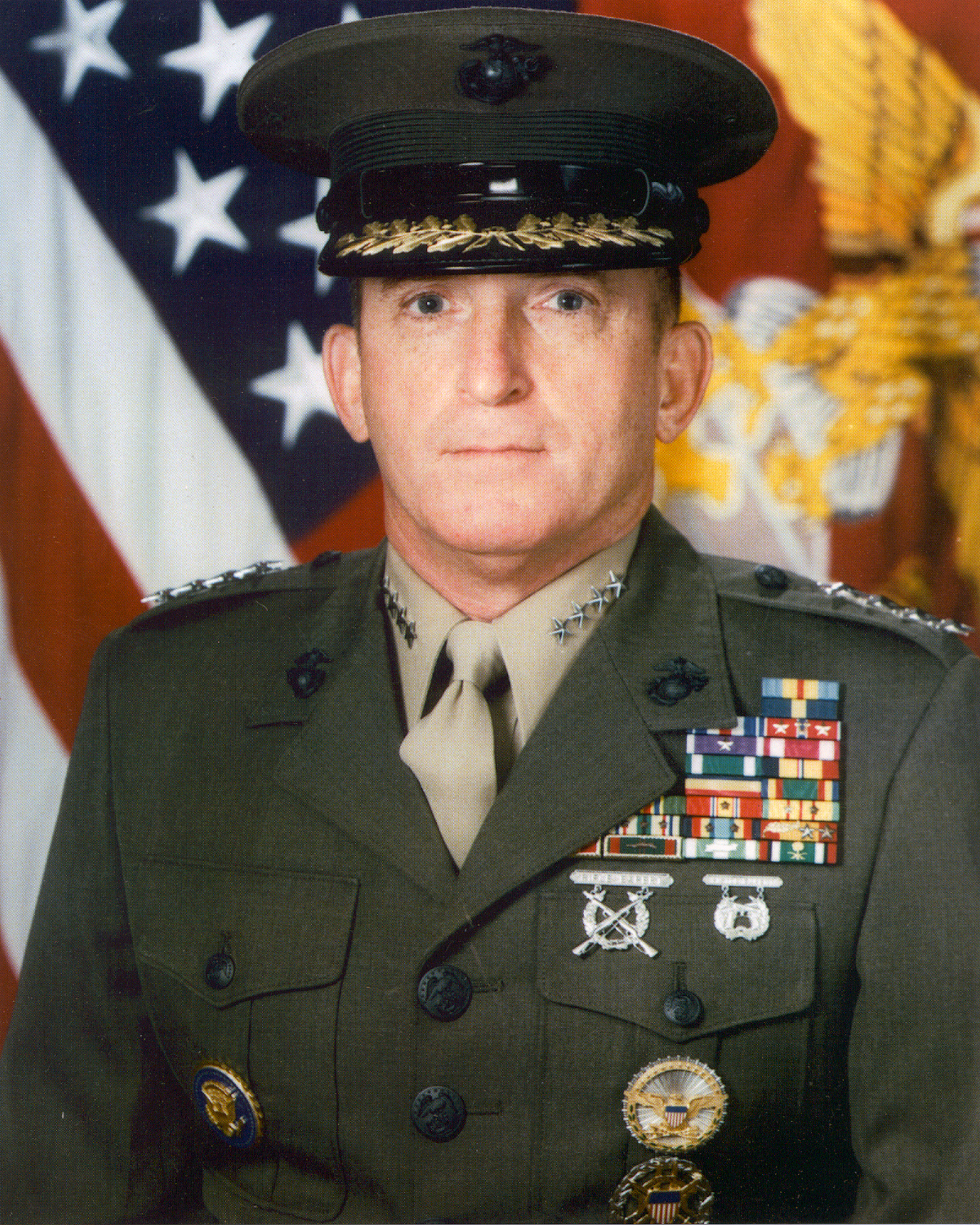
- Official portrait, 1995
- Born: March 4, 1942 (age 84); Quantico, Virginia, U.S.
- Father: Victor H. Krulak
- Military career
- Allegiance: United States
- Branch: United States Marine Corps
- Service years: 1963–1999
- Rank: General
- Nickname: Chuck
- Commands: Commandant of the Marine Corps; Marine Corps Combat Development Command; Marine Forces Pacific; 2nd Force Service Support Group; 3rd Battalion, 3rd Marines
- Conflicts: Vietnam War; Persian Gulf War; Operation Desert Shield; Operation Desert Storm
- Awards: Defense Distinguished Service Medal (2); Navy Distinguished Service Medal (2); Army Distinguished Service Medal; Air Force Distinguished Service Medal; Coast Guard Distinguished Service Medal; Silver Star; Bronze Star Medal (3); Purple Heart (2)

Charles Chandler Krulak (born March 4, 1942) is a retired United States Marine Corps four-star general who served as the 31st Commandant of the Marine Corps from July 1, 1995, to June 30, 1999. He is the son of Lieutenant General Victor H. "Brute" Krulak, who served in World War II, Korea, and Vietnam. He was the 13th President of Birmingham–Southern College after his stint as a non-executive director of English soccer club Aston Villa.

== Early life and education ==
Krulak was born in Quantico, Virginia, on March 4, 1942, the son of Amy (née Chandler) and Victor H. Krulak. He graduated from Phillips Exeter Academy in Exeter, New Hampshire, in 1960, where he was classmates with novelist John Irving. Krulak then attended the United States Naval Academy, graduating in 1964 with a bachelor's degree. Krulak also holds a master's degree in labor relations from George Washington University (1973). He is a graduate of the Amphibious Warfare School (1968); the Army Command and General Staff College (1976); and the National War College (1982).

== Marine career ==
After his commissioning and graduation from The Basic School at Marine Corps Base Quantico, Krulak held a variety of command and staff positions. His command positions included: commanding officer of a platoon and two rifle companies during two tours of duty in Vietnam; commanding officer of Special Training Branch and Recruit Series at Marine Corps Recruit Depot San Diego, California (1966–1968); commanding officer of Counter-Guerilla Warfare School, Northern Training Area on Okinawa (1970), Company officer at the United States Naval Academy (1970–1973); commanding officer of the Marine Barracks at Naval Air Station North Island, California (1973–1976), and commanding officer, 3rd Battalion, 3rd Marines (1983–1985).

Krulak's staff assignments included: operations officer, 2nd Battalion, 9th Marines (1977–1978); chief of the Combat Arms Monitor Section at Headquarters Marine Corps, Washington, D.C. (1978–1979); executive assistant to the Director of Personnel Management, Headquarters Marine Corps (1979–1981); Plans Office, Fleet Marine Forces Pacific, Camp H.M. Smith, Hawaii (1982–1983); executive officer, 3rd Marine Regiment, 1st Marine Expeditionary Brigade; assistant chief of staff, maritime pre-positioning ships, 1st MEB; assistant chief of staff for operations, 1st Marine Expeditionary Brigade; and the military assistant to the assistant secretary of defense for command, control, communications and intelligence, Office of the Secretary of Defense.

Krulak was assigned duty as the deputy director of the White House Military Office in September 1987. While serving in this capacity, he was selected for promotion to brigadier general in November 1988. He was advanced to that grade on June 5, 1989, and assigned duties as the commanding general, 10th MEB/Assistant division commander, 2nd Marine Division, Fleet Marine Force Atlantic, at Marine Corps Base Camp Lejeune, North Carolina on July 10, 1989. On June 1, 1990, he assumed duties as the commanding general, 2nd Force Service Support Group Group/Commanding general, 6th Marine Expeditionary Brigade, Fleet Marine Force Atlantic and commanded the 2d FSSG during the Gulf War. He served in this capacity until July 12, 1991, and was assigned duty as assistant deputy chief of staff for manpower and reserve affairs (personnel Management/Personnel Procurement), Headquarters Marine Corps on August 5, 1991. He was advanced to major general on March 20, 1992. Krulak was assigned as commanding general, Marine Corps Combat Development Command, Quantico, on August 24, 1992, and was promoted to lieutenant general on September 1, 1992. On July 22, 1994, he was assigned as commander of Marine Forces Pacific/commanding general, Fleet Marine Force Pacific, and in March 1995 he was nominated to serve as the Commandant of the Marine Corps.

On June, 29, he was promoted to general and assumed duties as the 31st commandant on June 30, 1995. He was relieved on June 30, 1999, by General James L. Jones.

In 1997, Krulak became a Life Member of the Sons of the Revolution in the State of California.

=== Silver Star citation ===
Citation:

The President of the United States of America takes pleasure in presenting the Silver Star to Captain Charles Chandler Krulak, United States Marine Corps, for conspicuous gallantry and intrepidity in action while serving as Commanding Officer of Company L, Third Battalion, Third Marines, Third Marine Division, during combat operations against the enemy in the Republic of Vietnam. On 3 June 1969, during Operation Virginia Ridge, Company L was occupying ambush positions near the Demilitarized Zone west of Con Thien when the Marines came under a heavy volume of mortar fire and sustained several casualties. Although seriously wounded himself, Captain Krulak unhesitatingly left his covered position and, thinking only of the welfare of his men, fearlessly maneuvered across the fire-swept terrain to ensure that his Marines were in effective defensive locations and capable of repelling an expected ground attack. Shortly after the initial mortar attack, the Company was subjected to a second intense mortar barrage. Realizing that the determined enemy soldiers had accurate range on the Marine emplacements, and unwilling to incur additional casualties, he commenced maneuvering his men to an alternate location. Simultaneously, undaunted by the fierce barrage, Captain Krulak fearlessly moved to a dangerously exposed vantage point from which he pinpointed the principal sources of hostile fire and skillfully coordinated fixed-wing air strikes and supporting artillery fire on the enemy positions, silencing the fire. By this time, both the platoon commander and a platoon sergeant of one of his platoons had been seriously wounded. After repeatedly exposing himself to the relentless fire to supervise the evacuation of the casualties, he then personally led the platoon back to the main body of his Company across 3,000 meters of rugged mountain terrain to another patrol base and, although weak from loss of blood and the pain of his injuries, steadfastly refused medical evacuation until the arrival of another officer on the following morning. By his courage, dynamic leadership, and inspiring devotion to duty in the face of grave personal danger, Captain Krulak minimized Marine casualties and upheld the highest traditions of the Marine Corps and of the United States Naval Service.

== Personal life ==
Krulak received the Golden Plate Award of the American Academy of Achievement in 1996. The Golden Plate was presented by Awards Council member and Chairman of the Joint Chiefs of Staff, General John M. Shalikashvili, USA.

Krulak joined MBNA America in September 1999 as chief administrative officer, responsible for personnel, benefits, compensation, education, and other administrative services. Krulak has served as the Senior Vice Chairman and Chief Executive Officer of MBNA Europe (2001–2005) and was based at the Chester campus in the UK. He was the executive vice chairman and chief administration officer of MBNA Corporation (2004–2005). He retired from MBNA in 2005.

Following the takeover of English football club Aston Villa by MBNA Chairman Randy Lerner in August 2006 and as of September 19, 2006, Krulak joined the board of Aston Villa as non-executive director where he posted on several fans forums. Krulak was generally referred to as "The General" by fans on these boards.

Krulak also serves on the boards of ConocoPhillips, Freeport-McMoran (formerly known as Phelps Dodge Corporation) and Union Pacific Corporation. In addition, he serves on the advisory council of Hope For The Warriors, a national non-profit dedicated to provide a full cycle of non-medical care to combat wounded service members, their families, and families of the fallen from each military branch.

Krulak was elected as the 13th President of Birmingham–Southern College in Birmingham, Alabama on March 21, 2011, and retired June 1, 2015. He received an honorary doctorate of Humane Letters from Birmingham-Southern College. The Krulak Institute for Leadership, Experiential Learning, and Civic Engagement at Birmingham-Southern College is named for him.

Krulak was the Vice Chair of the Sweet Briar College Board of Directors. He joined the Board in the Summer of 2015.

In 2019, Krulak criticized the Birmingham Civil Rights Institute's decision to award the Fred Shuttlesworth Human Rights Award to Angela Davis, an activist and scholar. In the statement, Krulak expressed "sadness" that Davis was selected, given her former affiliation with the Communist Party USA as well as support for the Soviet Union, Cuba and other Communist countries with poor human rights records.

== Awards and decorations ==
General Krulak's decorations and medals include:

Defense Distinguished Service Medal w/ 1 bronze oak leaf cluster
Navy Distinguished Service Medal w/ 1 gold award star	Army Distinguished Service Medal	Air Force Distinguished Service Medal	Coast Guard Distinguished Service Medal
Silver Star	Bronze Star Medal w/ valor device & 2 award stars	Purple Heart with gold star	Meritorious Service Medal
Navy Commendation Medal	Combat Action Ribbon	Presidential Unit Citation w/ 1 service star	Navy Unit Commendation
Meritorious Unit Commendation	National Defense Service Medal w/ 1 service star	Vietnam Service Medal w/ 6 service stars	Southwest Asia Service Medal w/ 3 service stars
Sea Service Deployment Ribbon w/ 2 service stars	Republic of Vietnam Cross of Gallantry with palm, silver star, & bronze star	French Legion of Honor, Commander	Republic of Vietnam Gallantry Cross Unit Citation
Republic of Vietnam Civil Actions Unit Citation	Republic of Vietnam Campaign Medal	Kuwait Liberation Medal (Saudi Arabia)	Kuwait Liberation Medal (Kuwait)
Presidential Service Badge		Office of the Secretary of Defense Identification Badge	Office of the Joint Chiefs of Staff Identification Badge

== Legacy ==
Krulak famously referred to the "Strategic Corporal" and the Three Block War as two of the key lessons identified from the deployments in Somalia, Haiti and Bosnia. These concepts are still considered vital in understanding the increasing complexity of modern battlefields.

Krulak explained some of his warfighting philosophy in an interview with Tom Clancy in Clancy's nonfiction book Marine. Clancy referred to Krulak as "Warrior Prince of the Corps." Krulak also rewrote the Marine Corps' basic combat study text, MCDP 1: Warfighting, incorporating his theories on operations in the modern battlefield.

== Family ==
Krulak is married to Zandi Meyers from Annapolis. They have two sons: Dr. David C. Krulak, a former U.S. Navy captain and the current Director of the TRICARE Health Plan at the Defense Health Agency and Dr. Todd C. Krulak, PhD., a retired freelance rave DJ who is a professor at Samford University; and five grandchildren: Capt Brian Krulak (USMC), Katie, Mary, Matthew, and Charles. He is the son of Lieutenant General Victor H. Krulak Sr., and the younger brother of Commander Victor H. Krulak Jr, Navy Chaplain Corps and Colonel William Krulak, United States Marine Corps Reserve. Krulak's godfather was USMC General Holland "Howlin' Mad" Smith.

== Notes ==
Military offices
Preceded by Hank Stackpole	Commander of the U.S. Marine Corps Forces, Pacific; Commanding General of the Fleet Marine Force, Pacific; 1994–1995	Succeeded by Jefferson D. Howell
Preceded by Carl E. Mundy Jr.	Commandant of the U.S. Marine Corps; 1995–1999	Succeeded by James L. Jones
