= Peter W. Chiarelli =

Retired United States Army general

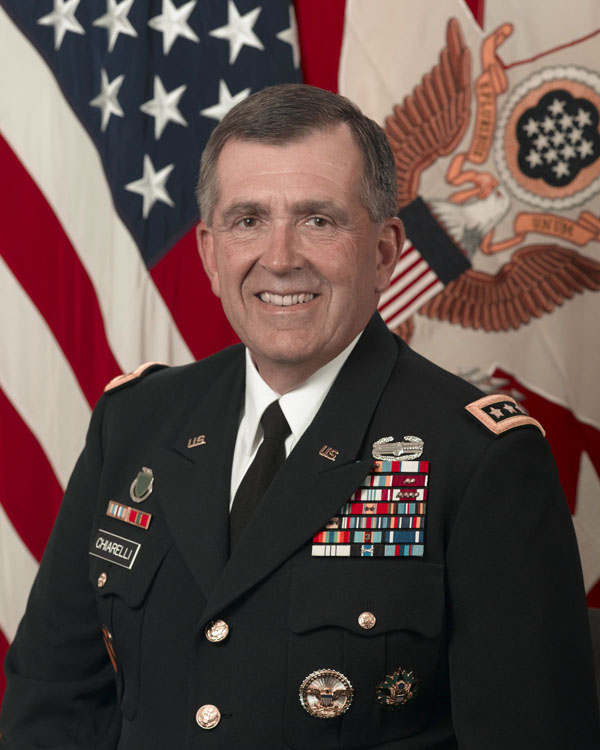
- Official portrait, 2008
- Born: 23 March 1950 (age 76); Seattle, Washington, U.S.
- Military career
- Allegiance: United States
- Branch: United States Army
- Service years: 1972–2012
- Rank: General
- Commands: Vice Chief of Staff of the United States Army; Multi-National Corps – Iraq; 1st Cavalry Division; 199th Infantry Brigade; 2nd Battalion, 1st Infantry Regiment
- Conflicts: Iraq War
- Awards: Defense Distinguished Service Medal (4); Army Distinguished Service Medal; Defense Superior Service Medal; Legion of Merit (3); Bronze Star Medal

Peter William Chiarelli (born 23 March 1950) is a retired United States Army general who served as the 32nd vice chief of staff of the United States Army from August 2008, to January 2012. He also served as commander, Multi-National Corps – Iraq under General George W. Casey, Jr. He was the senior military assistant to the secretary of defense from March 2007 to August 2008. He retired from the United States Army on 31 January 2012, after nearly 40 years of service, and was succeeded as Vice Chief of Staff by General Lloyd J. Austin III.

== Early life and education ==
Chiarelli was born in Seattle, Washington, on 23 March 1950, and graduated from Queen Anne High School in 1968. He is a Distinguished Military Graduate of Seattle University Army Reserve Officers' Training Corps. Chiarelli was commissioned a second lieutenant in September 1972. Throughout his career, he has served in army units in the United States, Germany, and Belgium. He has commanded at every level from platoon to corps.

== Military career ==
Chiarelli's first assignments were with the 9th Infantry Division at Fort Lewis, including: support platoon leader for 3rd Squadron (Air), 5th Cavalry Regiment; squadron assistant intelligence staff officer (S-2); squadron intelligence staff officer (S-2); troop executive officer; and troop commander.

Chiarelli's principal staff assignments were Operations Officer (G-3), 1st Cavalry Division, at Fort Hood, Texas; Executive Assistant and, later, Executive Officer to the Supreme Allied Commander, Commander United States European Command at SHAPE Headquarters, Mons, Belgium; and the Director of Operations, Readiness, and Mobilization (G-3/5/7) at Headquarters, Department of the Army.

Chiarelli commanded a motorized infantry battalion, 2nd Battalion, 1st Infantry Regiment, and the 199th Infantry Brigade, a separate motorized brigade at Fort Lewis, Washington; served as the assistant division commander for support in the 1st Cavalry Division at Fort Hood, Texas; served as commanding general, 1st Cavalry Division, and led it both in the Iraq War and during Operation Iraqi Freedom II; and served as commanding general of Multi-National Corps – Iraq from January 2006.

Chiarelli holds a Bachelor of Science degree in political science from Seattle University, a Master of Public Administration degree from the Daniel J. Evans School of Public Affairs at the University of Washington, and a Master of Arts degree in national security strategy from Salve Regina University. He is also a graduate of the U.S. Naval Command and Staff College and the National War College.

Chiarelli worked to reduce suicide rates in the army. Out of concerns for stigma, he began using the term "posttraumatic stress", dropping the word "disorder" from the medical name posttraumatic stress disorder. His term had subsequently become standard use in the armed forces, but was not taken up by the medical community. The name "posttraumatic stress injury" has been proposed by some psychiatrists in 2012, and is endorsed by Chiarelli.

== Post-military ==
In 2018 Chiarelli retired as CEO of One Mind, which is dedicated to benefiting all affected by brain illness and injury through fostering fundamental changes – using open science principles and creating global public-private partnerships among governmental, corporate, scientific and philanthropic communities – that will radically accelerate the development and implementation of improved diagnostics, treatments and cures – while eliminating the stigma that comes with mental illness.

In the 2024 United States presidential election, Chiarelli endorsed Kamala Harris.

== Awards and decorations ==
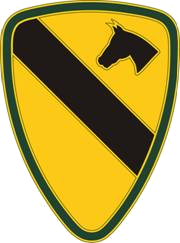
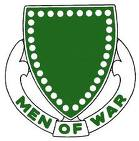
| Combat Action Badge |
| Office of the Secretary of Defense Identification Badge |
| Army Staff Identification Badge |
| 1st Cavalry Division Combat Service Identification Badge |
| 33rd Armor Regiment Distinctive Unit Insignia |
| 4 Overseas Service Bars |

| Defense Distinguished Service Medal (with three bronze oak leaf clusters) |
| Army Distinguished Service Medal |
| Defense Superior Service Medal |
| Legion of Merit (with two bronze oak leaf clusters) |
| Bronze Star Medal |
| Defense Meritorious Service Medal |
| Meritorious Service Medal (with four bronze oak leaf clusters) |
| Army Achievement Medal (with one bronze oak leaf cluster) |
| Joint Meritorious Unit Award |
| Army Meritorious Unit Commendation |
| Army Superior Unit Award |
| Department of State Distinguished Honor Award |
| National Defense Service Medal (with two bronze service stars) |
| Armed Forces Expeditionary Medal |
| Iraq Campaign Medal (with two bronze service stars) |
| Global War on Terrorism Expeditionary Medal |
| Global War on Terrorism Service Medal |
| Army Service Ribbon |
| Army Overseas Service Ribbon (with bronze award numeral "4") |
| NATO Medal for Yugoslavia |
| Estonian Distinguished Service Decoration of the Defense Forces for battle merit |
| Unidentified |
| Medal of Honour - Defence General Staff Joint Forces (Italy) |

The Hero of Military Medicine Award was presented 4 May 2011, to Army Vice Chief of Staff Gen. Peter W. Chiarelli for his efforts to help Soldiers with traumatic brain injury and post-traumatic stress. The Henry M. Jackson Foundation for the Advancement of Military Medicine (HJF) presented the award at the National Museum of Women in the Arts in Washington, D.C., during a HJF Center for Public-Private Partnerships (CP3) event.

Military offices
| Preceded by Richard Cody | Vice Chief of Staff of the United States Army; 2008–2012 | Succeeded by Lloyd Austin |
