= Three Block War =

US military concept

The Three Block War is a concept described by U.S. Marine General Charles Krulak in the late 1990s to illustrate the complex spectrum of challenges likely to be faced by Marines on the modern battlefield. In Krulak's example, Marines may be required to conduct full-scale military action, peacekeeping operations and humanitarian aid within the space of three contiguous city blocks. The thrust of the concept is that modern militaries must be trained to operate in all three conditions simultaneously, and that to do so, leadership training at the lowest levels needs to be high. The latter condition caused Krulak to invoke what he called "strategic corporals"; low-level unit leaders able to take independent action and make major decisions.

The term has been referenced by then-CENTCOM commander (later Secretary of Defense) General James Mattis, and has also been adopted by the British, Israeli and Singaporean military, including former Chief of the General Staff, General Sir Mike Jackson and former Defence Secretary Geoff Hoon, and also by former Canadian Chief of Defence Staff Rick Hillier.

== "Strategic corporal" ==
The strategic corporal is the notion that leadership in complex, rapidly evolving mission environments devolves lower and lower down the chain of command to better exploit time-critical information into the decision making process, ultimately landing on the corporal, the lowest ranking non-commissioned officer, typically commanding a fire team of 4 individuals or a squad of 12 individuals (three fireteams). In very rapidly evolving mission situations, obtaining mission instructions from remotely located command may result in mission failure, or in casualties to both force personnel and civilians. Conversely, misusing this kind of responsibility may result in personal liability for the team leader: a decision executed to respond to situational needs may result in later prosecution as the team leader's actions are reviewed by higher authorities.

The term "strategic corporal" was coined by General Charles C. Krulak in the title of an article in Marines Magazine about the "Three Block War," an increasingly important arena of military operations characterized by engagement with hostile, neutral and friendly forces, all at the same time, in a very geographically limited area, e.g., three blocks.

This concept requires forces to apply an appropriate type of response in a timely manner relative to the immediate context. Complex rules of engagement are needed that will minimize collateral damage to civilians and infrastructure. However, training "strategic corporals" requires time and money above and beyond what is considered normal infantry or military police training.

The U.S. Army has used the Strategic Corporal term for their plan to equip ordinary squad leaders with advanced laser rangefinders to plot artillery fire.

== Impact ==
The need to conduct operations in this situation has significantly emphasised the importance of low level tactical leaders and led to the term strategic corporal being devised.

One of the adjustments in the USMC is to move coordination of artillery down from the battalion to the company level.

== Example ==
In the Battle of Mogadishu, as detailed in the book and film Black Hawk Down, small-unit leaders on the ground continually had to make crucial decisions which had major impacts on not only the forces initially deployed on the mission, but to follow-on forces as well.

== See also ==
- Hybrid warfare
