= Steven R. Rudder =

United States Marine Corps general

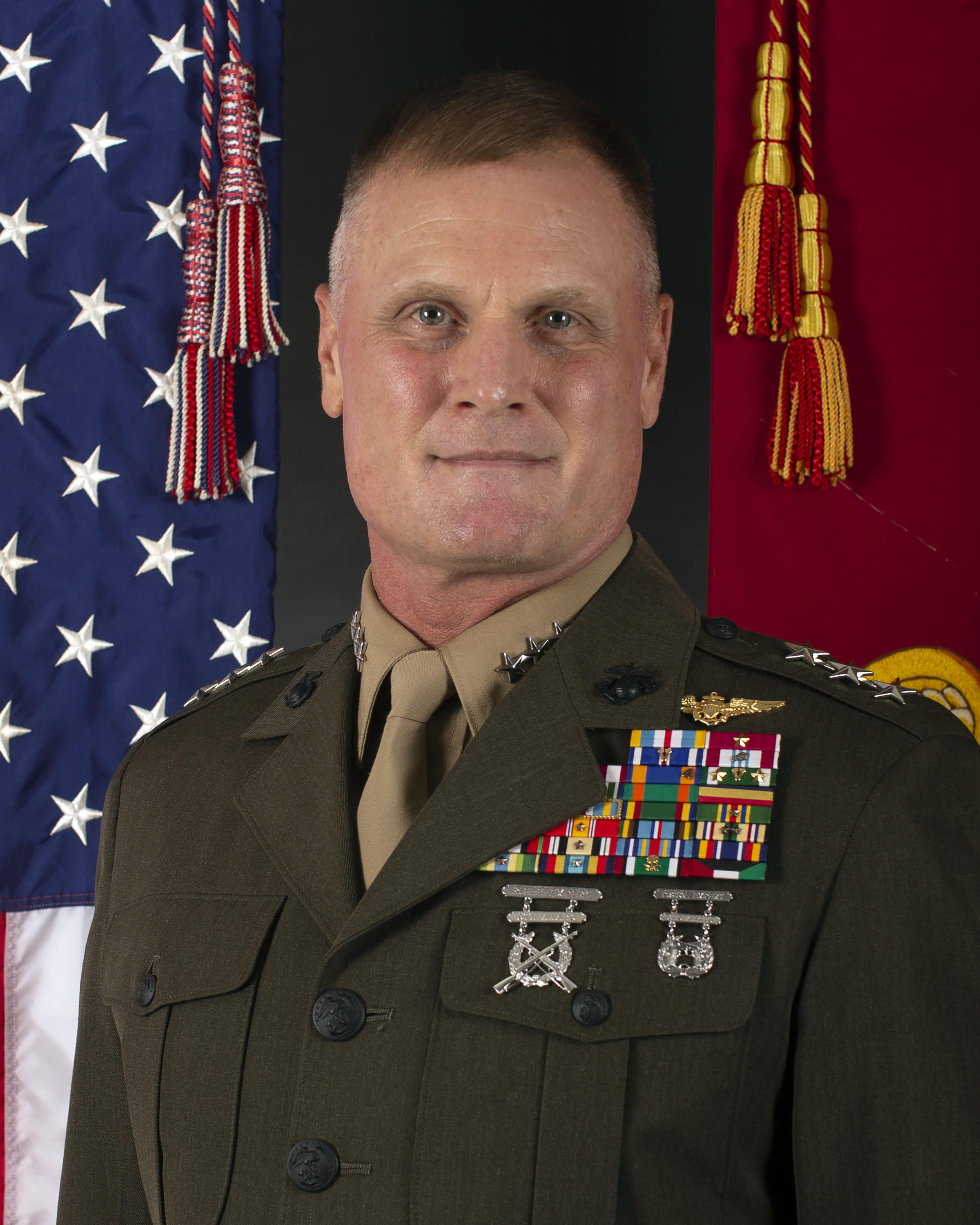
- Military career
- Allegiance: United States
- Branch: United States Marine Corps
- Service years: 1984–2022
- Rank: Lieutenant General
- Commands: US Marine Corps Forces, Pacific; 1st Marine Air Wing; Marine Aircraft Group 26
- Conflicts: Gulf War; War in Afghanistan; Iraq War
- Awards: Defense Superior Service Medal (2); Legion of Merit (2); Distinguished Flying Cross

Steven R. Rudder is a retired United States Marine Corps lieutenant general and Naval Aviator. Rudder has served as Deputy Commandant for Aviation, USMC and Commanding General, United States Marine Corps Forces, Pacific.

== Marine Corps career ==
Rudder was commissioned in the United States Marine Corps as a second lieutenant in 1984. He graduated from The Basic School at Marine Corps Base Quantico and his first assignment was to 3rd Amphibious Assault Battalion. He received a transfer to Naval Air Station Pensacola for flight training. He was designated a Naval Aviator in 1987. His operational assignments include AH-1 Cobra helicopter training with HMT-303 followed by service with HMLA-367 as Maintenance Officer and Tactics Instructor.

Rudder's staff and command assignments include HMM-161; Weapons and Tactics Officer deploying with the 11th MEU(SOC); AH-1 Division Head, Marine Aviation Weapons and Tactics Squadron One; Operations Officer, Marine Light Attack Helicopter Squadron 167; Future Operations Officer HMM-261 deploying with the 22nd MEU; Military Assistant to Andrew Marshall, Office of the Secretary of Defense, the Pentagon; Squadron Commander, HML/A-167; Senior Watch Officer, 3rd Marine Air Wing; J5 Lead planner for Afghanistan and Pakistan, USCENTCOM, Tampa, Florida; Commanding Officer of Marine Aircraft Group 26 deploying to Iraq, in support of Operation Iraqi Freedom; Branch Head of Aviation, Headquarters Marine Corps Aviation; student, United States Army War College; Legislative Assistant to the Commandant, Office of Legislative Affairs, HQMC; Commanding General, 1st Marine Air Wing in Okinawa, Japan; Director of Strategic Planning and Policy, United States Pacific Command; Deputy Commandant for Aviation from July 2017 to July 2020; and Commanding General, United States Marine Corps Forces, Pacific.

Rudder retired from active duty in September 2022. He and his company Stick Rudder Enterprises LLC were sanctioned by the Chinese government on October 10, 2024 due to arms sales to Taiwan.

== Awards and decorations ==
U.S. military decorations
Defense Superior Service Medal with one bronze oak leaf cluster
Legion of Merit with one gold award star
Distinguished Flying Cross with Combat "V" Device
Defense Meritorious Service Medal with oak leaf cluster
Meritorious Service Medal with gold award star
Air Medal with bronze Strike/flight numeral 4
Navy and Marine Corps Commendation Medal with Combat "V" Device and award star
Joint Service Achievement Medal
Navy Achievement Medal
U.S. Unit Awards
Navy Presidential Unit Citation
Joint Meritorious Unit Award with oak leaf cluster
Navy Unit Commendation
Navy Meritorious Unit Commendation with two service stars
U.S. Service (Campaign) Medals and Service and Training Ribbons
National Defense Service Medal with service star
Armed Forces Expeditionary Medal
Southwest Asia Service Medal with three bronze campaign stars
Afghanistan Campaign Medal with campaign star
Iraq Campaign Medal with campaign star
Global War on Terrorism Expeditionary Medal
Global War on Terrorism Service Medal
Armed Forces Service Medal
Navy Sea Service Deployment Ribbon with four service stars
Kuwait Liberation Medal (Saudi Arabia)
Kuwait Liberation Medal (Kuwait)

U.S. badges, patches and tabs
Naval Aviator Insignia
Rifle Expert Badge
Pistol Expert Badge

Military offices
Preceded by Christopher S. Owens	Commanding General of the 1st Marine Aircraft Wing; 2013–2015	Succeeded by Russell A. Sanborn
Preceded by ???	Director of Strategic Planning and Policy of the United States Pacific Command; 2015–2017	Succeeded by Joaquin F. Malavet
Preceded by Jon M. Davis	Deputy Commandant for Aviation; 2017–2020	Succeeded by Mark R. Wise
Preceded by Lewis A. Craparotta	Commander of the United States Marine Corps Forces Pacific; 2020–2022	Succeeded by William M. Jurney
