= Daniel Yoo (general) =

United States Marine Corps general

Daniel D. Yoo
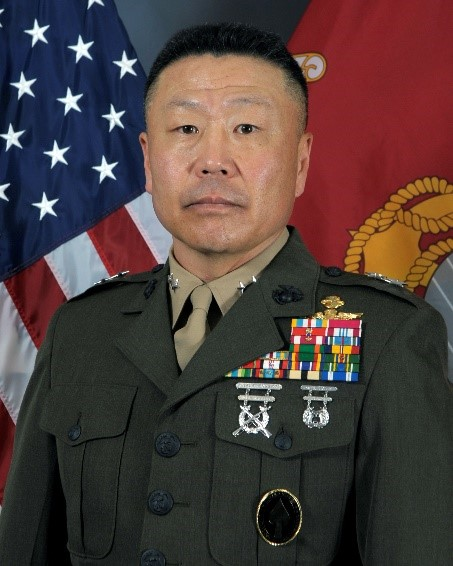
- Born: July 4, 1962 (age 64); Seoul, South Korea
- Military career
- Allegiance: United States
- Branch: United States Marine Corps
- Service years: 1985–2020
- Rank: Major General
- Commands: United States Marine Corps Forces Special Operations Command; Marine Expeditionary Brigade-Afghanistan; 4th Marine Regiment
- Conflicts: War in Afghanistan
- Awards: Defense Superior Service Medal; Legion of Merit; Bronze Star Medal (2)

Daniel Daejin Yoo (born July 4, 1962) is a retired United States Marine Corps major general and former commander of United States Marine Corps Forces Special Operations Command. He was the first Korean-American general in the history of the United States Marine Corps.

== Education ==
Yoo graduated from Arizona State University in 1984 with a Bachelor of Science degree in Justice Studies. He is a graduate of the Naval War College, Army Ranger School and United States Army Airborne School.

== Military career ==
Yoo was commissioned in the United States Marine Corps as a second lieutenant in 1985 following completion of Officer Candidate School. Upon graduation from The Basic School and the Infantry Officers Course, Yoo reported to the 1st Marine Division, Camp Pendleton, in 1986. He served with 2nd Battalion, 9th Marines as a rifle platoon commander, heavy machine gun platoon commander, weapons company executive officer and a rifle company commander. In 1989, Yoo received assignment to the 3rd Reconnaissance Battalion, 3rd Marine Division in Okinawa, Japan. During this tour, he served as a Reconnaissance Platoon Commander and a Reconnaissance Company Commander. From 1992 to 1995 Yoo served as Inspector-Instructor, Detachment, 4th Force Reconnaissance Company, in Reno, Nevada, followed by service Headquarters Marine Corps, Washington, D.C. from 1995 to 1998. In July 1998, Yoo attended the Naval Command and Staff College, Naval War College, earning a Masters of Arts degree in National Security and Strategic Studies in 1999. In August 1999, he was assigned to duty with the Current Operations Division, G3, II Marine Expeditionary Force and the 2nd Marine Expeditionary Brigade at Camp Lejeune. From March 2001 to 2002 Yoo was assigned as Operations Officer, 26th Marine Expeditionary Unit (Special Operations Capable) followed by command of Infantry Training Battalion, School of Infantry (East) from July 2002 to June 2004. He next was assigned to Director of Operations, J-3, Operations Directorate, Joint Staff, Washington, D.C. before commanding the 4th Marine Regiment, 3rd Marine Division from 2008 to 2010. He deployed in support of Operation Enduring Freedom as the Commander, Regional Corps Advisory Command Central 3-7, 201st Corps, Afghan National Army from July 2009 to April 2010. As a brigadier general, Yoo was commanding general, I Marine Expeditionary Force (Forward).

Yoo commanded the Marine Corps presence of 7,000 personnel in Helmand, southwest Afghanistan, in 2014, leading the International Security Assistance Force's Regional Command Southwest and Marine Expeditionary Brigade-Afghanistan. It was the final deployment of the MEP-Afghanistan. Yoo oversaw the handover of Helmand in October 2014 to the Afghan National Army's 215th Corps, marking a transition in which the Marine Corps became a supporting force in the area rather than combat force.

As a major general, Yoo assumed duties as commanding officer of United States Marine Forces Special Operations Command (MARSOC) from June 2018 to 26 June 2020. Yoo relinquished command of MARSOC to Major General James F. Glynn.

== Awards and decorations ==
U.S. military decorations
Defense Superior Service Medal
Legion of Merit
Bronze Star Medal with one gold award star
Defense Meritorious Service Medal
Meritorious Service Medal with gold award star
Joint Service Achievement Medal
Navy Achievement Medal
Combat Action Ribbon
Joint Meritorious Unit Award
Navy Unit Commendation
Navy Meritorious Unit Commendation with one bronze service star
U.S. Service (Campaign) Medals and Service and Training Ribbons
National Defense Service Medal with bronze service star
Afghanistan Campaign Medal with silver campaign star
Global War on Terrorism Service Medal
Korea Defense Service Medal
Armed Forces Service Medal
Navy Sea Service Deployment Ribbon with silver and two bronze service stars
Marine Corps Combat Instructor Ribbon
NATO Medal for service with ISAF

U.S. badges, patches and tabs
Marine Corps Combatant Diver Insignia
Navy and Marine Corps Parachutist Insignia
Rifle Expert Badge (several awards)
Pistol Expert Badge (several awards)
United States Special Operations Command Identification Badge

Military offices
Preceded by Carl E. Mundy III	Commanding General of the United States Marine Forces Special Operations Command; 2018–2020	Succeeded by James F. Glynn
