= William Jurney =

U.S. Marine Corps general

William M. Jurney
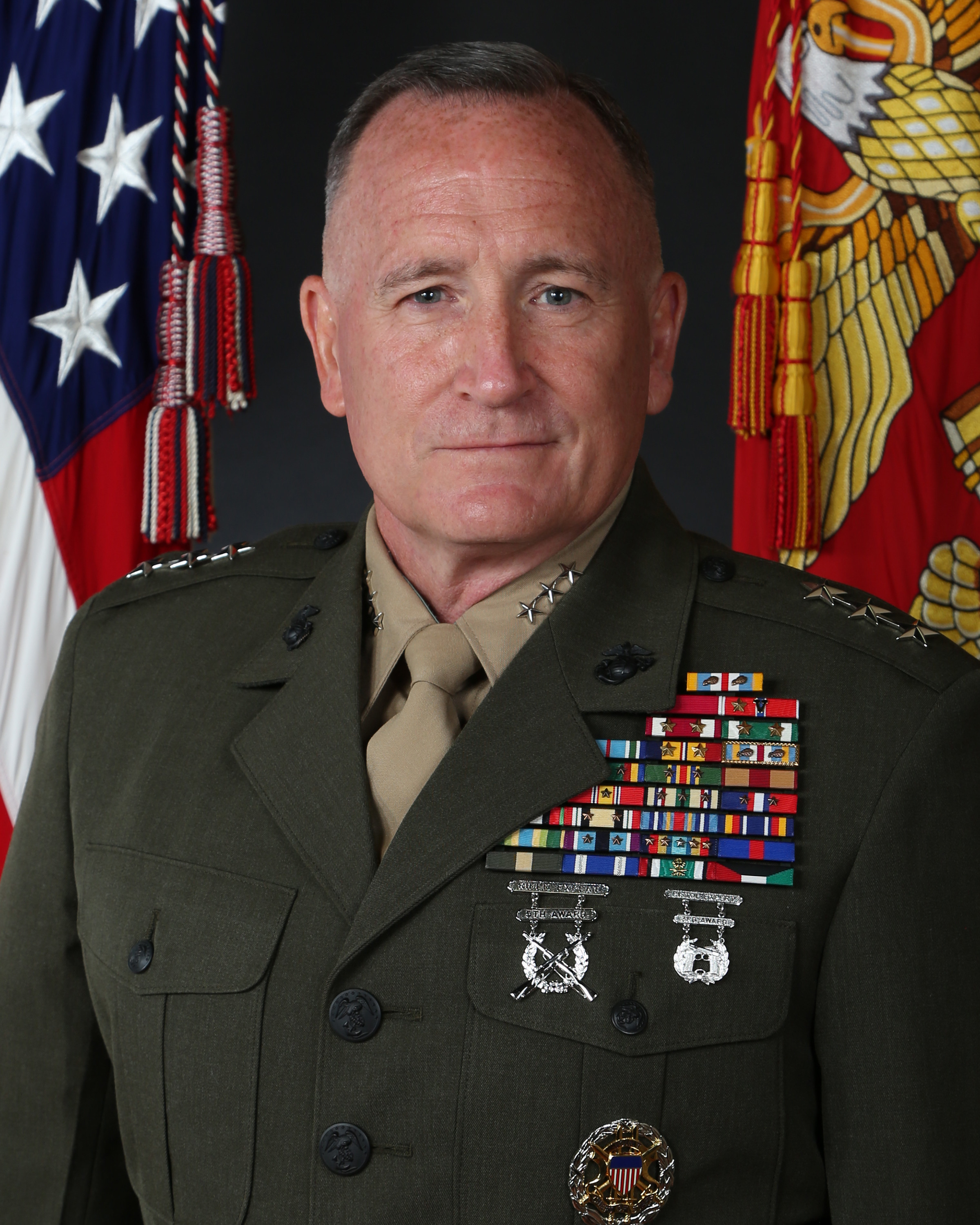
- Official portrait, 2021
- Military career
- Allegiance: United States
- Branch: United States Marine Corps
- Service years: 1987–2024
- Rank: Lieutenant General
- Commands: United States Marine Corps Forces, Pacific; II Marine Expeditionary Force; Marine Air Ground Task Force Training Command; Marine Corps Air Ground Combat Center; 3rd Marine Division; Marine Corps Recruit Depot San Diego
- Conflicts: Gulf War; War in Afghanistan; Iraq War
- Awards: Defense Superior Service Medal (3); Legion of Merit; Bronze Star Medal (2)

William M. Jurney is a retired United States Marine Corps lieutenant general who last served as the commander of United States Marine Corps Forces, Pacific from 2022 to 2024. He most recently served as commanding general of the II Marine Expeditionary Force from 2021 to 2022. He previously served as Commanding General of the Marine Air-Ground Task Force Training Command and Marine Corps Air Ground Combat Center and prior to that was the Commanding General of the 3rd Marine Division.

== Honours ==
- Order of the Rising Sun, 2nd Class, Gold and Silver Star (2025)

Military offices
Preceded by Craig Q. Timberlake	Commanding General of the 3rd Marine Division; 2018–2020	Succeeded by James W. Bierman
Preceded by Roger B. Turner Jr.	Commanding General of the Marine Air-Ground Task Force Training Command and Marine Corps Air Ground Combat Center; 2020–2021	Succeeded by Austin E. Renforth
Preceded by Brian Beaudreault	Commanding General of the II Marine Expeditionary Force; 2021–2022	Succeeded by David Ottignon
Preceded by Steven R. Rudder	Commander of the United States Marine Corps Forces, Pacific; 2022–2024	Succeeded by James F. Glynn
