= Earl B. Hailston =

USMC general officer (born 1947)

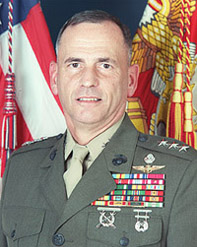
- LtGen Earl Hailston, USMC (Ret)
- Born: May 27, 1947 (age 79); Utica, New York, U.S.
- Military career
- Allegiance: United States
- Branch: United States Marine Corps
- Service years: 1967–2003
- Rank: Lieutenant General
- Commands: United States Marine Corps Forces Pacific, U.S. Marine Forces Central Command
- Conflicts: Vietnam War
- Awards: ~ Defense Distinguished Service Medal; Silver Star; Legion of Merit; Bronze Star with Combat V

Earl B. Hailston (born May 27, 1947) is a retired Marine Corps lieutenant general. He was Commanding General of United States Marine Corps Forces Pacific, U.S. Marine Forces Central Command, and U.S. Marine Corps Bases Pacific.

== Early career ==
Hailston began his career in the Marine Corps as an enlisted infantry rifleman in 1967. After completing boot camp, he reported to the 2nd Marine Division for duty as an infantry rifleman. Shortly after, Hailston entered the Enlisted Commissioning Program and received his commission in 1968. After completing The Basic School, Hailston received assignment as a rifle platoon commander with India Company "I", 3rd Battalion, 27th Marines.

== Vietnam Service ==
From July 1969 to January 1971, Hailston served in the Republic of Vietnam assigned to the 1st Reconnaissance Battalion 1st Marine Division.

== Later career ==
He attended flight training in Pensacola, Florida, receiving his wings in June 1973.

Other training schools attended include Amphibious Warfare School and the Air Command And Staff College. He earned his bachelor's degree from Troy State University.

In May 1994, Hailston was promoted to the rank of brigadier general and was commander of the 3rd Force Service Support Group, FMF, Pacific, Okinawa, Japan. Further commands included:

- July 1996 – Assistant Deputy Chief of Staff, Installations and Logistics (Facilities), Headquarters, U.S. Marine Corps, Washington, D.C.
- March 1997 to June 1999 – Promotion to major general U.S. Pacific Command Director of Strategic Plans and Policy (J-5).
- June 1999 – III Marine Expeditionary Force and Marine Corps Bases Japan. Promotion to lieutenant general in June 1999.
- August 2001 to retirement – Component Commander for the U.S. Pacific Command and U.S. Central Command. In mid January 2002, General Tommy Franks forward deployed Hailston's command to Bahrain.

=== Okinawa email controversy ===
While serving as commanding general of the III Marine Expeditionary Force, General Hailston drafted an email to 13 USMC officers in which he called the local Okinawa officials "all nuts and a bunch of wimps". The email followed a January 2001 incident where a Marine was arrested for lifting up the dress of an Okinawan schoolgirl. Hailston later made an apology stating:

The message was an attempt, in a very emotional manner, to gain the strict attention of my commanders. If my remarks in the e-mail are construed as suggesting anything else, then I am deeply sorry and apologize for the misunderstanding.

== In retirement ==
He serves as Chairman of the Air Warrior Courage Foundation.

== Awards ==
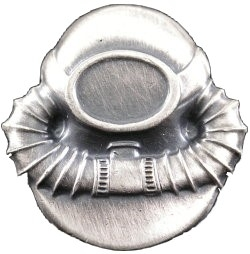

SCUBA Diver badge Naval Aviator Badge
Defense Distinguished Service Medal	Silver Star	Legion of Merit	Bronze Star w/ valor device
Defense Meritorious Service Medal	Meritorious Service Medal w/ 1 award star	Navy and Marine Corps Commendation Medal	Combat Action Ribbon
Joint Meritorious Unit Award	Navy Unit Commendation	Navy Meritorious Unit Commendation	National Defense Service Medal w/ 1 service star
Vietnam Service Medal w/ 1 service star	Navy Sea Service Deployment Ribbon w/ 3 service stars	Navy & Marine Corps Overseas Service Ribbon w/ 2 service stars	Vietnam Gallantry Cross w/ gold star
Vietnam Armed Forces Honor Medal	Vietnam Gallantry Cross unit citation	Vietnam Civil Actions unit citation	Vietnam Campaign Medal
