= Royal N. Moore Jr. =

United States Marine Corps general

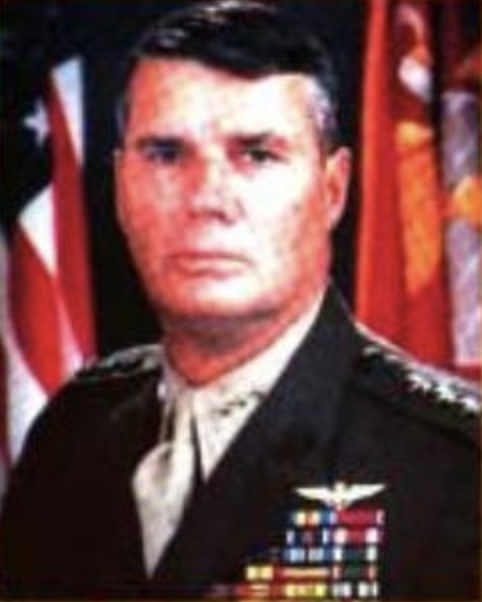
- Born: April 15, 1935 (age 91); Pasadena, California, U.S.
- Military career
- Allegiance: United States
- Branch: United States Marine Corps
- Service years: 1956–1992
- Rank: Major General
- Commands: 3rd Marine Aircraft Wing
- Conflicts: Vietnam War; Persian Gulf War
- Awards: Defense Distinguished Service Medal; Navy Distinguished Service Medal; Legion of Merit; Distinguished Flying Cross

Royal Norman Moore Jr. (born April 15, 1935) is a retired major general in the United States Marine Corps. He was promoted to LtGen while acting as Commanding General of 3rd Marine Aircraft Wing. Following his combat service during Operation Desert Shield/Desert Storm he was assigned as Commander of Fleet Marine Force, Pacific from August 1991 to April 1, 1992. In 1992 after it was discovered that he had previously falsified a NATOPS EA-6B proficiency test by having a junior Officer complete the test for him and submit it as his own results. He resigned his command after the discovery, which led to a censure by Secretary of the Navy H. Lawrence Garrett III, and his retirement as a MGen since he did not honorably hold the rank of LtGen for the required 3 years. From 1989 to 1991 while he commanded the 3rd Marine Aircraft Wing during the Persian Gulf War, he was described as "the nation's top Marine aviator".
