= Edwin J. Godfrey =

US Marine Corps general officer (1932–2002)

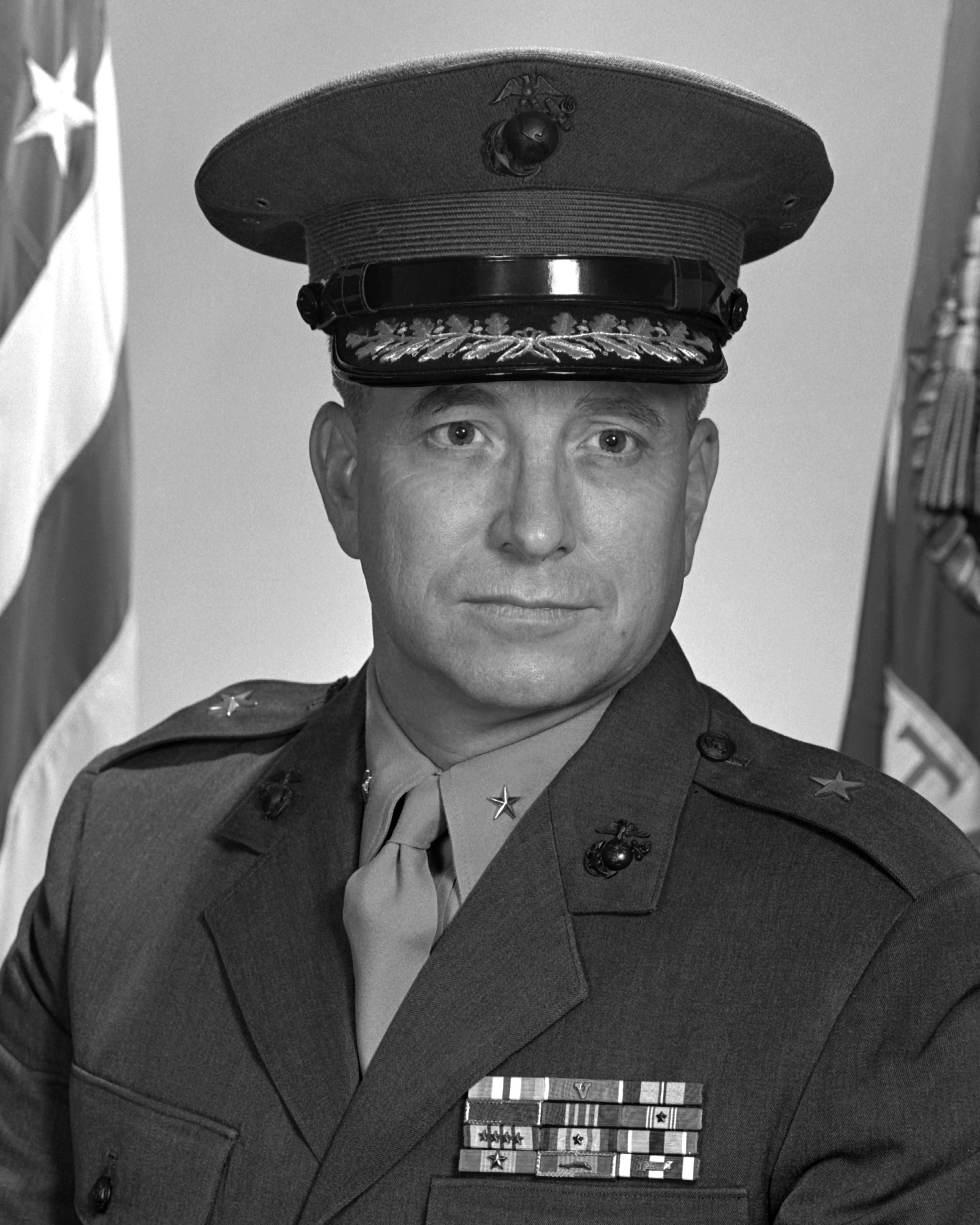
- Brigadier General Godfrey (1 Jan 1981)
- Born: 16 September 1932; Montclair, New Jersey, US
- Died: 12 April 2002 (aged 69); San Diego, California, US
- Education: Dartmouth College (1954)
- Military career
- Branch: US Marine Corps
- Years: 1954–1989 (35.4 years)
- Rank: Lieutenant general
- Commands: 3rd Sp Bn; 9th MAB; 3rd FSSG; III MAF; FMFPAC
- Conflicts: Vietnam War
- Awards: Navy Distinguished Svc.

Edwin J. Godfrey (16 September 1932 – 12 April 2002) was a United States Marine Corps general.

== Personal life ==
Edwin J. Godfrey was born on 16 September 1932 in Montclair, New Jersey. He graduated from Dartmouth College in 1954, and died on 12 April 2002 in San Diego, California.

== Military career ==
Godfrey was commissioned a second lieutenant in the United States Marine Corps in June 1954. After graduation from The Basic School, he was assigned to the 2nd Marine Division at Camp Lejeune, North Carolina. Through 1964, he had assignments to the United States European Command headquarters, Camp Pendleton with the 1st Marine Division, and Okinawa Prefecture with the 3rd Marine Division.

During the Vietnam War, while assigned to the 3rd Marine Division, Godfrey commanded the 3rd Shore Party Battalion and was then S-3 of the 9th Marines. In the late 1970s, Godfrey worked with the Joint Chiefs of Staff and the staff of Sylvester R. Foley Jr.—commander of the United States Seventh Fleet. From 1981–84, he was "Assistant Division Commander of the 3d Marine Division", commander of the 9th Marine Amphibious Brigade, and commander of the 3d Force Service Support Group.

In 1987, Major General Godfrey was the commander of III Marine Amphibious Force in Okinawa, Japan. On 9 September, President Ronald Reagan nominated Godfrey to take command of Fleet Marine Force, Pacific with a commiserate promotion to lieutenant general and a move to Camp H. M. Smith in Hawaii; Godfrey accepted the promotion, and took command on 2 October, relieving Major General Richard M. Cooke.

Lieutenant General Godfrey retired from the Marines on 1 November 1989, receiving the Navy Distinguished Service Medal for his service "as Commanding General, Fleet Marine Force, Pacific/Commander, Marine Corps Bases, Pacific, from 2 October 1987 to 31 October 1989."
