= Viper (disambiguation) =

Vipers are snakes in the family Viperidae.

Viper may also refer to:

== Arts and entertainment ==
=== Film and television ===
- The Viper (1938 film), a lost British film
- The Viper (1965 film), a Soviet drama film
- Viper (film), 2001
- Vipers (film), 2008
- Viper (TV series), a 1990s American series
- "Viper" (Gotham), an episode in the television series Gotham

=== Music ===
- Viper (band), a Brazilian heavy metal band
- Vyper, an American heavy metal band that signed a contract with Eric Greif
- Viper (rapper), an American musician regarded as a pioneer of cloud rap
- The Viper Label, a British indie record label
- "Viper", a song on Loudspeaker by Marty Friedman

=== Roller coasters ===
- Viper (Six Flags Darien Lake), in New York
- Viper (Six Flags AstroWorld), in Texas
- Viper (Six Flags Great Adventure), in New Jersey
- Viper (Six Flags Great America), in Illinois
- Viper (Six Flags Magic Mountain), in California
- Viper (Six Flags Over Georgia), in Georgia

=== Fictional characters ===
- Viper (G.I. Joe), the code name given to a large majority of the soldiers in the Cobra Organization of the G.I. Joe toyline
- Viper (Marvel Comics), the name of four villains
  - Viper (Madame Hydra), Ophelia Sarkissian
- Viper (Reborn! character), in the manga series Reborn!
- Viper (Sgt. Frog), a family in the manga series Sgt. Frog
- Viper, in the video game Titanfall 2
- Viper, the Netherdrake, in the video game series Dota
- Viper Squad, in the Manta Force toyline
- Crimson Viper, in the Street Fighter fighting game franchise
- Dr. Viper, the primary villain in the SWAT Kats television series
- General Viper, in the video game Chrono Cross
- Master Viper, in the Kung Fu Panda franchise
- Black Arts Viper, a Metal Gear: Ghost Babel character
- Mike "Viper" Metcalf, commanding officer and instructor in the film Top Gun
- Sabine Callas, codenamed Viper, in the video game Valorant
- The Viper, a drug dealer played by Irish comedian Chris Tordoff in Hardy Bucks

=== Other arts and entertainment ===
- Viper Comics, an independent publisher of comic books and graphic novel trade paperbacks
- Vipers (Battlestar Galactica), starfighter spacecraft in the Battlestar Galactica franchise
- Viper, a series of adult video games by publisher and developer Sogna
- The Viper (novel), a 2009 novel by Polish writer Andrzej Sapkowski
- The Viper (Russian: Гадюка), a 1928 novel by Aleksey Nikolayevich Tolstoy
- VIPER (Champions), a 1993 supplement for the role-playing game Champions
- Viper, a role in the 2018 game called Among Us

== Consumer products ==
- ESP Viper, an electric guitar
- Ovation Viper, an electric guitar
- Remington Model 522 Viper, a semi-automatic rifle
- Serpent Viper 977, a 1/8 scale radio controlled pan-car by Serpent
- Thomson Viper FilmStream Camera
- Viper, a brand of vacuum cleaner by Nilfisk
- Viper, car alarms and accessories produced by Directed Electronics

== Military uses ==
=== Aviation ===
- General Dynamics F-16 Fighting Falcon, a jet fighter nicknamed "Viper"
- HMLA-169, a USMC helicopter squadron nicknamed "Vipers"
- Bell AH-1Z Viper, a twin-engine attack helicopter
- Armstrong Siddeley Viper, a turbojet engine

=== Naval vessels ===
- HMS Viper, various Royal Navy ships
- USS Viper, three US Navy ships
- SMS Viper, two ships, one German and one Austro-Hungarian
- KRI Viper, an Indonesian Navy patrol boat

=== Rockets and missiles ===
- AGM-80 Viper, an American air-to-surface missile
- Dornier Viper, an air-to-air missile
- FGR-17 Viper, an antitank rocket, subject of a government spending controversy
- Giant Viper, a rocket-launched mine-clearance system
- Viper Dart, a sounding rocket
- Viper Strategic Strike missile, an American cruise missile

=== Other military uses ===
- VIPeR, a military robot

== People ==
- Martin Foley (criminal) (born 1952), Irish criminal known as "The Viper"
- Viper (actress) (1959–2010), American pornographic actress with a full-body snake tattoo
- Kimberly Benson (born 1991), Scottish professional wrestler, ring name Viper
- Randy Orton (born 1980), American professional wrestler nicknamed "The Viper"
- Viper (rapper) (born 1971), American rapper

== Places ==
- Viper, Kentucky, an unincorporated community
- Viper Island, one of the Andaman Islands of India
- The Viper, Mill Green, a public house in Essex, England

== Sports teams ==
- Alabama Vipers, an American football team (2000–2010)
- Calgary Vipers, a Canadian baseball team (2005–2011)
- Chattahoochee Valley Vipers, an American indoor football team (2006)
- HC Vipers Tallinn, an Estonian ice hockey team (2011–present)
- Newcastle Vipers, a British ice hockey club (2002–2011)
- Rio Grande Valley Vipers, an American basketball team (2007–present)
- Southern Vipers, an English women's cricket team (2016–present)
- St. Louis Vipers, an American roller hockey team (1993–1999)
- Vaughan Vipers, a junior ice hockey team in Ontario, Canada (1991–2012)
- Vegas Vipers, an XFL team (2020–2023)
- Vernon Vipers, a junior A hockey team in British Columbia, Canada (1961–present)
- Vipers Kristiansand, a Norwegian former handball team (1938–2025)

== Technology ==
- Video Identification Parade Electronic Recording (VIPER), a British system for conducting digital identity parades
- VIPER microprocessor, a microprocessor designed by the Royal Signals and Radar Establishment
- Viper telescope, used to view mainly cosmic background radiation
- VIPER (rover), a cancelled NASA lunar rover

== Transportation ==
=== Air ===
- Paxman Viper, a Canadian ultralight homebuilt kit aircraft of 1994, of which only one was built
- Tomark Viper SD4, an airplane made in Slovakia beginning in the mid-2000s
- Wolseley Viper, a V-8 aircraft engine of the World War I era (c. 1918)

=== Land ===
- Dodge Viper, a two-seat sports car manufactured by Chrysler (previously known as the SRT Viper)
- Eurofly Viper, an Italian ultralight trike aircraft
- Millyard Viper V10, a one-off motorcycle
- Velocette Viper, a British motorcycle made by Velocette between 1955 and 1968

=== Sea ===
- Viper 640, an American sailboat design
- Viper (catamaran), a catamaran used for racing

== Other uses ==
- VIPERs, exchange-traded funds issued by The Vanguard Group
- Viper (hieroglyph), an Egyptian hieroglyph

== See also ==
- VIPIR (disambiguation)
- Valley Vipers (disambiguation)
