= GT9 =

- Pardini GT9, an Italian made pistol
- 9ff GT9, a German made sports car
- Tomark Skyper GT9, a Slovakian aircraft
- Denel GT-9, a South African cannon
