= 169 Squadron =

169 Squadron or 169th Squadron may refer to:

- No. 169 Squadron RAF, a unit of the United Kingdom Royal Air Force
- 169th Airlift Squadron (United States), a unit of the United States Air Force
- HMLA-169 (Marine Light Attack Helicopter Squadron 169), a United States Marine Corps helicopter squadron consisting
