= George J. Trautman III =

United States Marine Corps general

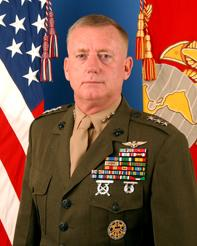
- Born: October 17, 1952 (age 73)
- Military career
- Allegiance: United States Marine Corps
- Rank: Lieutenant General
- Commands: HMLA-169; Marine Aircraft Group 36; 1st Marine Expeditionary Brigade; Marine Corps Base Hawaii; 1st Marine Aircraft Wing
- Conflicts: Operation Desert Storm; Operation Enduring Freedom; Operation Iraqi Freedom
- Awards: Navy Distinguished Service Medal; Defense Superior Service Medal(2); Legion of Merit(2); Defense Meritorious Service Medal; Meritorious Service Medal(4)

George Joseph Trautman III is a retired U.S. Marine Lieutenant General served as the Deputy Commandant for Aviation of the United States Marine Corps from 2007 to 2011. He retired from active duty military service on March 31, 2011.

== Military career ==
After graduating from The Basic School, Trautman entered flight training and was subsequently designated a naval aviator in April 1976. He completed initial aircrew training at 3rd Marine Aircraft Wing and was then transferred to 1st Marine Brigade, MCAS Kaneohe, Hawaii. While with the Brigade he completed two Marine Amphibious Unit (MAU) deployments to the Western Pacific and Southwest Asia.

Reassigned to 3rd Marine Aircraft Wing in 1980, Lieutenant General Trautman served with various Marine Light Attack Helicopter Squadrons and the 11th MAU as they began training for the initial sourcing of Western Pacific deployments from I Marine Expeditionary Force. From 1984 through 1987, Trautman served as an instructor with Marine Aviation Weapons and Tactics Squadron One. He then attended the College of Naval Command and Staff followed by assignment as the Assistant Operations Officer aboard USS Okinawa.

From 1990 through 1993, Trautman served first as Executive Officer, then as Commanding Officer of HMLA-169. His squadron deployed with 5th Marine Expeditionary Brigade to Southwest Asia in support of Operation Desert Storm. After spending the next year at the Brookings Institution, he was assigned to the Joint Staff, Force Structure, Resources, and Assessment Directorate (J-8).

From 1997 through 1999, Trautman served as Commanding Officer, Marine Aircraft Group 36 (MAG 36). He next served as Branch Head, Aviation Weapon Systems Requirements Branch, Department of Aviation, Headquarters Marine Corps.

In July 2000, Trautman was assigned to serve as the 3rd Marine Aircraft Wing Assistant Wing Commander. In June 2001, he also served as the Commander, Combined Joint Task Force Kuwait. From November 2001 through March 2002, he assumed duties as the Deputy Commanding General, I Marine Expeditionary Force and Commanding General, 1st Marine Expeditionary Brigade.

From June 2002 until August 2004, Trautman served as Deputy Director, Plans and Policy (J-5), U. S. Central Command while forward deployed at various locations in support of Operation Enduring Freedom and Operation Iraqi Freedom.

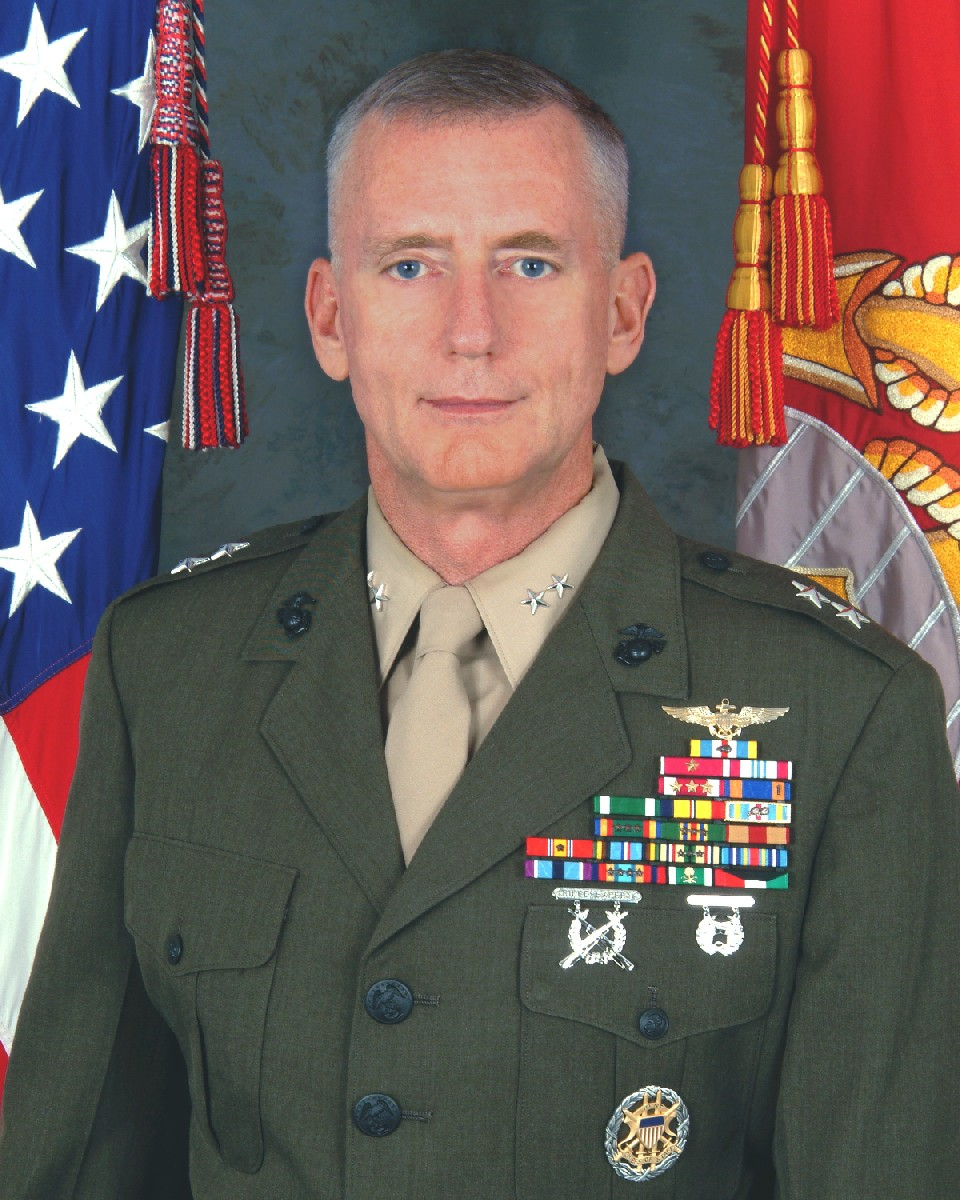
Major General George Trautman III, former commanding officer of 1st Marine Aircraft Wing

From August 2004 through June 2005, Trautman served as the Commanding General, Marine Corps Base Hawaii; Deputy Commander, U. S. Marine Corps Forces, Pacific; and Deputy Commanding General, III Marine Expeditionary Force Hawaii. On June 10, 2005, Lieutenant General Trautman assumed command of the 1st Marine Aircraft Wing. On June 8, 2007, Trautman was promoted to Lieutenant General and ordered to Headquarters Marine Corps to serve as Deputy Commandant for Aviation.

== Personal decorations ==
Lieutenant General Trautman's personal decorations include:

Naval Aviator Badge
| 1st Row | Navy Distinguished Service Medal | Defense Superior Service Medal w/ 1 oak leaf cluster | | |
| 2nd Row | Legion of Merit w/ 1 award star | Defense Meritorious Service Medal | Meritorious Service Medal w/ 3 award stars | Air Medal |
| 3rd Row | Navy and Marine Corps Commendation Medal | Combat Action Ribbon | Joint Meritorious Unit Award w/ 1 oak leaf cluster | Navy Unit Commendation |
| 4th Row | Navy Meritorious Unit Commendation | Marine Corps Expeditionary Medal | National Defense Service Medal w/ 2 service stars | Armed Forces Expeditionary Medal |
| 5th Row | Southwest Asia Service Medal | Global War on Terrorism Expeditionary Medal | Global War on Terrorism Service Medal | Armed Forces Service Medal |
| 6th Row | Humanitarian Service Medal | Navy Sea Service Deployment Ribbon w/ 5 service stars | Kuwait Liberation Medal (Saudi Arabia) | Kuwait Liberation Medal (Kuwait) |

Trautman received the Distinguished Alumni Award from the Penn State Board of Trustees in 2009.

== Education ==
Lieutenant General Trautman earned a B.S. in Biology in 1974 from Pennsylvania State University where he was a member of the Sigma Tau Gamma fraternity. He earned three master's degrees — an M.S. in Systems Management from the University of Southern California, an M.A. in International Relations from Salve Regina University, and an M.A. in National Security and Strategic Studies from the Naval War College. He is also a graduate of the Armed Forces Staff College and was a Fellow in residence at the Brookings Institution.

== Personal ==
Trautman married Zoe Ann Yoder of Towanda, Pennsylvania on September 11, 1976.
