= Police lineup =

Criminal justice identification process

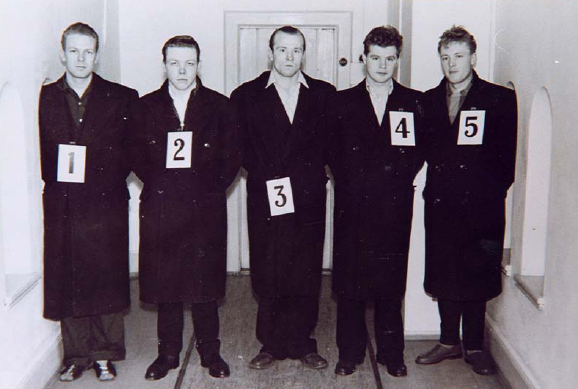
Fredrik Fasting Torgersen in the center of a police lineup.

A police lineup (in American English) or identity parade (in British English) is a process by which a crime victim or witness's putative identification of a suspect is confirmed to a level that can count as evidence at trial.

The suspect, along with several "fillers" or "foils"—people of similar height, build, and complexion who may be prisoners, actors, police officers, or volunteers—stand side-by-side, both facing and in profile. There is crucial information that should be conveyed to the eyewitness prior to viewing the lineup. It is necessary to inform the eyewitness that it is possible the perpetrator is not present in the lineup. The eyewitness should also be told that they do not have to choose one of the people from the lineup. Including these details has shown to result in fewer misidentifications. The lineup sometimes takes place in a room for the purpose, one which may feature a one-way mirror to allow a witness to remain anonymous, and may include markings on the wall to aid identifying the person's height.

For evidence from a lineup to be admissible in court, the lineup itself must be conducted fairly. The police may not say or do anything that persuades the witness to identify the suspect that they prefer. This includes loading the lineup with people who look very dissimilar to the suspect.

== Alternatives ==
The three main forms of police lineups are photographs of suspects, videos, or the original form of physically present lineups. While photos and videos are often more practical and convenient, lineups where suspects are physically present have been shown to improve identification.

Photographs of the suspect and fillers can be shown to the identifier in what is called a "photo-lineup", or a "six pack". If the victim or witness successfully identifies the suspect from among the fillers, the identification is considered valid. There is some research into using other methods of photo-lineup that involve the witness sequentially viewing photographs rather than simultaneously.

The sequential method is considered more accurate than simultaneous lineups because it prevents the witness from looking at all the suspects and merely selecting the person that most resembles the guilty person.

A "show-up" is another alternative, in which a suspect is individually shown to a witness. However, this method is generally accepted as suggestive and not the preferred method at the risk of an eyewitness mistakenly identifying an innocent individual.

However, recent research suggests that the most reliable method is the interactive lineup. This allows a witness to dynamically view faces from multiple angles. By doing so, witnesses are more likely to spontaneously reinstate the angle at which they saw the perpetrator—known as perpetrator pose reinstatement—which improves discrimination accuracy.

Many UK police forces use Video Identification Parade Electronic Recording (VIPER), a digital system wherein witnesses view video recordings of suspects and unrelated volunteers.

== Sequential lineup ==
A sequential lineup is one of the two methods used for eyewitnesses to identify criminals in police station. In a standard sequential lineup, the suspects or their photos are presented one at a time to the witnesses only once. Witnesses make decisions about each individual suspect before the next one is shown and they do not know the total number of suspects.

=== History ===
Although it is hard to pinpoint exactly when sequential lineups were first studied, the knowledge that simultaneous lineups often failed and convicted an innocent person has been common knowledge for many years. The advance of the popularity of sequential lineups can be traced to the Innocence Project and Gary Wells. Wells has many studies that show that sequential lineups lead to fewer wrongful convictions. The early studies of sequential lineups found that there was a significant difference in the wrongful conviction of innocent persons. Since these early studies there has been a push to increase the accuracy of eyewitness memory even more.

One way this is accomplished is by having not just sequential lineups, but also double-blind sequential lineups. A double-blind sequential lineup is conducted by making sure that neither the witness nor the person conducting the lineup has any idea who the suspect is. This eliminates any bias the person conducting the lineup may have. The research for double-blind studies has shown that "now we have proof from the field that witnesses who view double-blind sequential lineups are just as likely to pick the suspect, and perhaps more importantly, less likely to make a misidentification by picking a filler in the lineup."

The study of sequential lineups is far from being finished and there is still much left to prove. The New York Times reported that Wells will continue to "examine the data gathered to gauge the level of certainty of witnesses and the effect of factors like cross-racial identification on accuracy."

=== Sequential lineup laps ===
A sequential lineup lap is showing the suspects repeatedly after the first round while in a standard sequential lineup eyewitnesses can only view them once. The thinking is that viewing the suspects again can increase the accuracy of identification since the eyewitnesses will be more certain about their answer.

Research found that viewing the suspects once more has a large influence on witnesses' performance. Many witnesses moved from no-choice to choice, some changed answers and their confidence went up. Both correct identification rate and mistaken rate increased in a sequential lineup lap when the suspect was present; the error rate increased only when the suspect was absent.

=== US law ===
While many states agree that sequential lineups can reduce wrongful convictions, they also notice that sequential lineups lead to more of a chance that the guilty would be overlooked and not convicted of their crime. Because of this many states do not want to implement a law that mandates sequential lineups. These states accept their benefits but do not want to rule out other types of lineup. There are different feelings about the advantages and disadvantages of sequential lineups. Gronlund, Carlson, Dailey, and Goodsell state one of the disadvantages: "Sequential lineups do not enhance accuracy but rather make eyewitnesses more conservative in their willingness to choose. Although this is desirable when the police have an innocent suspect, it is problematic if the police have a guilty one." But Lindsay, Mansour, Beaudry, Leach, and Bertrand show one of the advantages of sequential lineups estimating that with them between 570 and 1425 innocent people would not be wrongfully convicted that would be with simultaneous lineups. According to the Innocence Project website, many states and law enforcement agencies have started to implement the tools that would be necessary to run double-blind sequential lineups but have yet to fully embrace them.

=== Studies ===
Cutler and Penrod (1988)

Brain L. Cutler and Steven D. Penrod conducted this study in 1988 to examine multiple variables' influence on eyewitnesses' accuracy during a lineup. The participants were first given a videotaped store robbery and a questionnaire, then asked to identify the robber in a photo lineup. They were given different videotapes, different lineups, and different instructions. There were 175 participants, all undergraduate college students.

The results were:

- Correct identification rate: 80% for sequential lineups and 76% for simultaneous lineups (total).
  - 78% for sequential lineups and 80% for simultaneous lineups when cues were strong.
  - 84% for sequential lineups and 58% for simultaneous lineups when cues were weak.

Mistaken rate in target-absent condition: 19% for sequential lineups and 39% for sequential lineups.

In this study, the correct identification rates were very much higher across all situations than normal. They also did not find a significant enough difference in correct identification rate between simultaneous and sequential lineups when the target was present. Most studies found that the correct identification rate is higher for simultaneous lineups.

Steblay, Dysart, and Wells (2011)

In 2011, Steblay, Dysart, and Wells attempted to answer a debate that has been around since the concept of sequential lineups. Are they superior to simultaneous lineups? In an effort to reproduce the results found in previous studies done on sequential lineups, Steblay, Dysart, and Wells took and combined results from 72 tests from 23 different labs from across the world including Canada, the United Kingdom, the United States, Germany, and South Africa. These results included data from 13,143 people who participated as witness in the studies. In this study they found very similar results to previous studies that have been conducted. They found that sequential lineups are less likely to identify any type (whether guilty or not guilty) of a suspect than simultaneous lineups, but that when a suspect was identified he/she was more likely to be guilty using this method than a simultaneous lineup.

They found that there is an 8% difference in suspect identification between sequential and simultaneous lineups, favoring simultaneous lineups; meaning that simultaneous lineups are more likely overall to identify the guilty suspect. This finding has decreased since 2001 where there was a 15% difference in favor of simultaneous lineups. They also replicated the findings that there is about a 22% difference between sequential and simultaneous lineups regarding errors in suspect identification; meaning that sequential lineups are less likely to identify the wrong suspect.

== Interactive lineups ==
Interactive lineups represent a modern approach to eyewitness identification, leveraging naturalistic models of faces and allows the user to dynamically view faces from multiple angles. Developed at the University of Birmingham, this new technology aims to overcome the limitations of traditional photo or live lineups by allowing witnesses to manipulate the view to better match their memory of a suspect's appearance.

=== Studies ===
==== Meyer et al. (2023) ====
Meyer and colleagues conducted a study in 2023 to evaluate the effectiveness of Interactive Lineups by allowing witnesses to actively explore and reinstate the study-test pose during a lineup. The study involved 475 participants who were randomly assigned to one of six conditions, which varied by lineup procedure (interactive, photo, or video) and encoding angle (front or profile). Participants were presented with twelve lineups, each containing a target-present and a target-absent condition.

Results:

- For front encoding, simultaneous interactive lineups increased correct identification rates by 35% compared to sequential video and 27% compared to simultaneous photo lineups.
- For profile encoding, correct identification rates improved by 75% compared to photo and 60% compared to video lineups.
- The study demonstrated that active exploration and pose reinstatement significantly boosted discriminability, with interactive lineups outperforming both photo and video lineups across different encoding conditions.

These findings suggest that interactive lineups offer significant improvements over traditional methods in terms of identification accuracy.

==== Colloff et al. (2021) ====
Colloff and colleagues conducted a study to explore the impact of pose reinstatement and active exploration on witness discriminability during police lineups. The study involved nearly 10,000 participants and compared sequential photo lineups with sequential interactive lineups, as well as simultaneous interactive lineups (where faces could be moved independently or jointly).

Results:

- Sequential interactive lineups increased correct identification rates of guilty suspects by 18% compared to sequential static lineups.
- Simultaneous-joint interactive lineups further improved correct identification rates by an additional 23% compared to sequential-independent interactive lineups.
- The study highlighted the importance of active exploration, pose reinstatement, and simultaneous comparison of faces, suggesting that these factors contribute to better witness discrimination accuracy.

This research underlined the potential of interactive lineups to significantly enhance the effectiveness of police identification procedures.

==== Winsor et al. (2021) ====
Winsor and colleagues conducted a study in 2021 to explore the reliability of child witnesses using an interactive lineup system. The study involved 2,205 children across three age groups: young (ages 4–6), middle (ages 7–9), and late childhood (ages 10–17). Children watched a video and then identified a person from a lineup using an interactive lineup system, where they could rotate the faces to view them from different angles.

Results:

- A strong confidence-accuracy relationship was observed from age 10, with emerging accuracy from age 7.
- Even the youngest children (ages 4–6) demonstrated reliable memory when appropriate metacognitive measures, such as viewing behavior, were used.
- The study showed that interactive viewing behavior differed between children who made correct and incorrect identifications, suggesting that even young children can provide reliable identifications when using advanced lineup systems.

This research highlights the potential of interactive lineups in calibrating child witness testimonies, challenging the traditional view that children's identifications are inherently unreliable.

== Fraud ==
The police can falsify the results of a lineup by giving hints to the witness. For example, they may let the witness "accidentally" see their preferred suspect in circumstances indicating criminality (e.g., in handcuffs) before the lineup. This is sometimes called an "Oklahoma showup" and was claimed to have been used in the Caryl Chessman case.

== Error rate ==
=== Limitations of technology ===
The use of DNA evidence has allowed for greater accuracy in choosing a suspect. It is evident that misidentification is not uncommon with police lineups. In a study published by the Association for Psychological Science, scientists discovered that in a group of 349 people that had been exonerated with DNA evidence, 258 of these people (roughly 3 out of every 4) were involved in mistaken eyewitness identification.

=== Familiarity ===
Mere exposure to a face can contribute to the illusion that an innocent person is the guilty party. For example, a witness might identify a receptionist as the guilty suspect simply because they had met briefly before, misattributing the familiarity to seeing the individual committing the crime. This is a source-monitoring error, where the familiarity is misattributed and unconsciously transferred to an innocent bystander. See also Familiarity heuristic.

=== Own-group recognition bias ===
Witnesses are more likely to correctly identify the faces of those with whom they share common features, such as race, age, and gender. See also cross-race effect, in-group favoritism, sex differences in eyewitness memory.

=== Framing bias ===
Subtle framing characteristics influence a witness' response to a question. For example, if a police officer asks which of the individuals in a lineup committed the crime, the wording of the question implies that one of the individuals is guilty, in a manner analogous to leading questions in court testimony. This suggestion increases the likelihood that the witness will pick someone from the lineup without positive recognition.

Additionally, the overwhelming majority of witnesses will identify a suspect from a lineup even if the actual perpetrator is not included in the lineup, often depending on how the instructions for choosing a suspect are presented. (See also framing effect.)

=== Feedback ===
Either confirming or refuting feedback to the witness has been shown to distort witnesses' reported perception of a suspect. Providing feedback to a witness after identifying a suspect can change the way they recall the quality and clarity of their perception of the incident, the speed and certainty of their identification, and other factors, even when witnesses believed the feedback had not influenced their report. During questioning or viewing pictures in a lineup, it was found that an eyewitness made a tentative judgement that a certain picture might be the guilty suspect, to which an officer administering the lineup answered, "okay". However, upon returning to that picture months later at trial, the witness expressed no doubt that the previously hypothesized picture represented the suspect.

=== Fillers ===
According to a 2021 study, optimal lineups have fillers who are similar to the description of the perpetrator of a crime, but who are otherwise dissimilar to the suspect. When fillers are highly similar to the suspect, it increases the chances that witnesses cannot make a possible identification. When fillers are highly dissimilar to the suspect, it increases the chances that witnesses erroneously identify an innocent person.

== See also ==
- Facial composite
