= Sigma Tau Gamma =

North American collegiate fraternity

- ΣΤΓ
- Founded: June 28, 1920; 106 years ago University of Central Missouri
- Type: Social
- Affiliation: NIC
- Status: Active
- Scope: National
- Motto: "A Path of Principles"
- Colors: Azure Blue and White
- Symbol: Chain of Honor
- Flag
- Flower: White Rose
- Mascot: Knight
- Publication: SAGA
- Philanthropy: Special Olympics
- Chapters: 76
- Members: 3,200+ active 70,268+ lifetime
- Nickname: Sig Tau
- Headquarters: 8741 Founders Road; Indianapolis, Indiana 46268; United States
- Website: sigtau.org

Sigma Tau Gamma (ΣΤΓ), commonly known as Sig Tau, is a United States college social fraternity founded on June 28, 1920, at the University of Central Missouri (then known as Central Missouri State Teachers College). The fraternity was founded as a result of friendships made while some of the founders fought in World War I in France.

The fraternity went on to create new chapters on the campuses surrounding teachers' colleges, at the time also called "normal schools". Since the fraternity's beginnings in 1920, it has chartered more than 193 chapters at campuses across the United States. The fraternity is a member of the North American Interfraternity Conference.

== History ==
Sigma Tau Gamma was founded on June 28, 1920, at the Central Missouri State Teachers College. Four of the founders—Emmett Ellis, Leland Thornton Hoback, Edward George Grannert, and William Glenn Parsons—had enlisted and served their country together during the World War I in France. These four, together with Allen Ross Nieman, Edward Henry McCune, Carl Nelson Chapman, Buell Wright McDaniel, George Eugene Hartrick, A. Barney Cott, Chiles Edward Hoffman, Rodney Edward Herndon, William Edward Billings, Clarence Willard Salter, Frank H. Gorman, Alpheus Oliphant Fisher, and Daniel Frank Fisher, were the seventeen founders of the fraternity.

Several of the founders were members of the Irving Literary Society, but they wanted to create a new fraternity including members of other literary societies. On the morning of June 28, 1920, a list containing the names of about thirty men was posted on the college bulletin board by Ellis with a request to meet that afternoon. Nieman, who had become familiar with fraternities while attending William Jewell College, was the principal organizer of the meeting. The men elected Hoback temporary chairman and Ellis temporary secretary. They agreed to begin crafting the organization and adjourned until July 7, 1920.

To present their petition to the faculty, the founders were accompanied by Dr. Wilson C. Morris, who had been part of Sigma Nu in his college days. Morris became the fraternity's first honorary member and served the Alpha chapter at Central Missouri as patron, counselor, and advisor until he died in 1947.

The fraternity went on to create new chapters on the campuses surrounding teachers' colleges, at the time also called "normal schools". Since the fraternity's beginnings in 1920, it has chartered more than 193 chapters at campuses across the United States. The fraternity is a member of the North American Interfraternity Conference.

== Symbols and traditions ==
There are several public and private ceremonies and rituals in the fraternity, from initiation to memorials for deceased fraternity members. Sigma Tau Gamma also has a development program known as the "Path of Principles". The first eight weeks of the program challenge associate members to "promote the highest ideals of brotherhood and demonstrate an abiding spirit in which all things in life are done and possible". Content is covered during weekly associate meetings held separate from the chapter meeting.

The fraternity's colors are azure blue and white. Its mascot is the knight, and its flower is the white rose.

Its coat of arms was adopted in 1927 and modified in 1954. The badge, which all members may purchase and wear, is the principal symbol of membership. The badge was adopted in 1927 and modified in 2016. The standard gold badge is provided to each new member at initiation. The associate pin is worn by associate members of the fraternity until initiation. The associate pin is the chapter's property and is returned to the chapter at the time of initiation by the new member.

== Activities ==
The fraternity hosts multiple annual events, including:

- The Noble Man Institute: a retreat-based leadership program for newly initiated members of Sigma Tau Gamma
- The Earl A. Webb Academy: a three-day training and networking program for chapter presidents and vice presidents
- The Endeavor conference
- The Grand Conclave.

== Philanthropy ==
On June 30, 2011, the Board of Directors announced its partnership with the Special Olympics in 2011, making it the fraternity’s official philanthropy. Each chapter is expected to provide service or funds directly to the Special Olympics.

The fraternity offers scholarships and awards to undergraduates and alumni during the summer convention. The individual awards include the Michael J. Steinbeck Fellowship, which offers assistance in the pursuit of graduate and professional degrees. Chapter awards include the Earl A. Webb Most Improved Chapter Award and the Emmett Ellis Chapter Scholarship Award

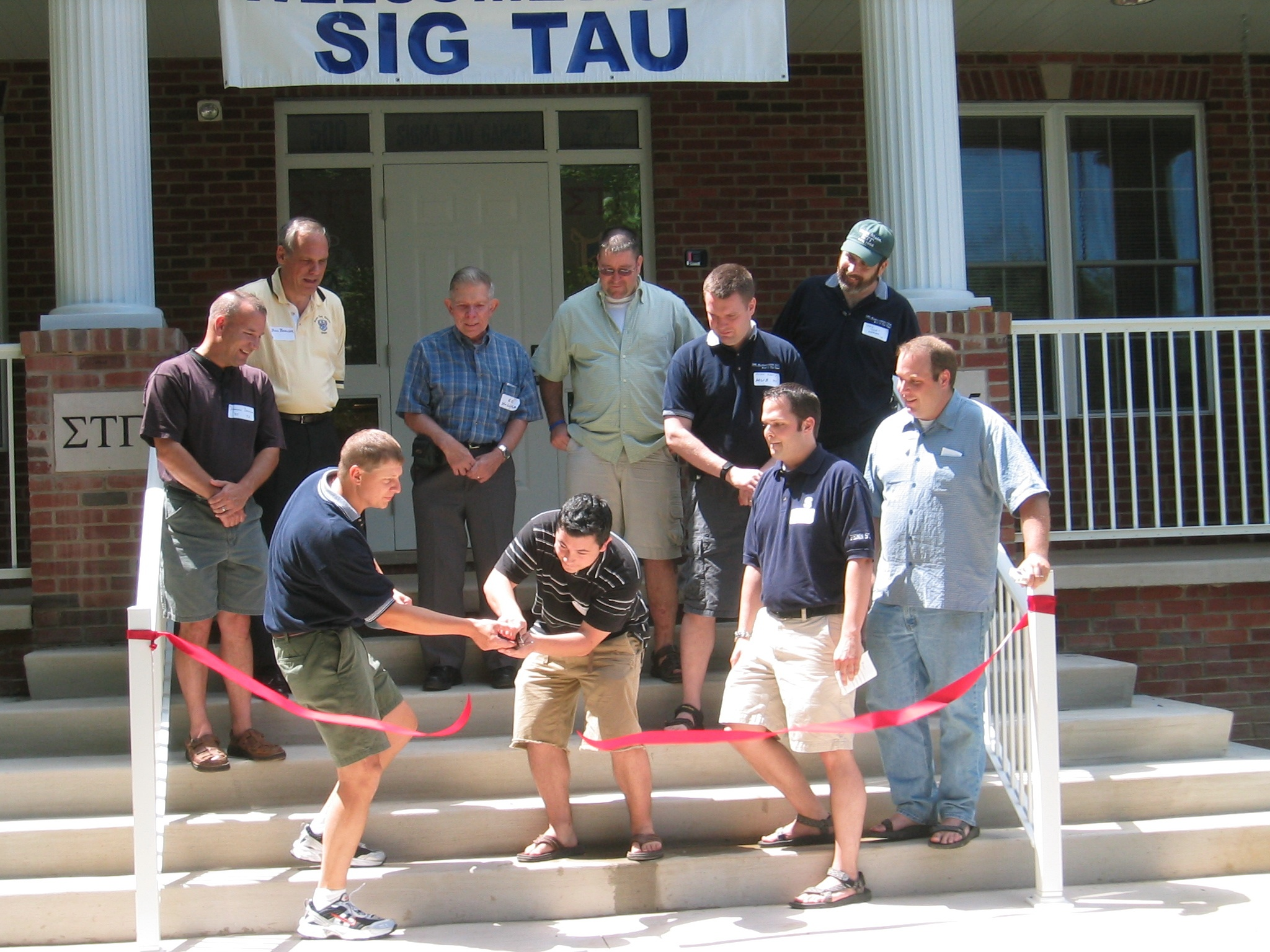
Ribbon Cutting at the opening of the new chapter house at Pennsylvania State University.

== Related corporations ==
=== Sigma Tau Gamma Foundation ===
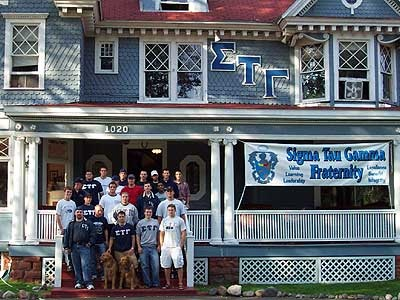
Gamma Chi chapter house at Michigan Technological University

Established in 1966, the Sigma Tau Gamma Foundation is its distinct legal entity, considered a public charity (501c3) by the federal government and is separate from the Sigma Tau Gamma Fraternity. It makes use of tax-deductible charitable gift dollars for the development of chapters of the Sigma Tau Gamma fraternity. The Sigma Tau Gamma Foundation started "Books for Kids," which raises money and books for public libraries and school districts.

=== WPN Housing Corporation ===
Established in 2014, the WPN National Housing Company is a limited liability company established to provide housing assistance and management as it relates to the housing or other forms of shared fraternity living/meeting space for undergraduate members of Sigma Tau Gamma.

== Notable members ==
- Tommy Armstrong, former member of the Louisiana House of Representatives
- John Ashcroft (Beta, honorary), United States Senate for Missouri and U.S. Attorney General
- Bill Bright (Zeta), evangelist and founder of Campus Crusade for Christ
- Dee Brown (Sigma 1931) author of Bury My Heart At Wounded Knee
- Geoff Connor (Delta Epsilon 1985), former Texas Secretary of State
- Nader Darehshori (Beta Mu 1965), chair, president, and CEO of Houghton-Mifflin Co. and Aptius Education
- Wayne DeSutter (Alpha Delta), professional football player
- Brad Ellsworth (Gamma Phi 1980), United States House of Representatives for Indiana
- Stan Frownfelter (Delta 1969), Kansas House of Representatives
- James A. Graham (Beta Pi), Medal of Honor and Purple Heart recipient
- Wallace H. Graham (Alpha 1932), President Harry S. Truman's personal physician and United States Army major general
- Mel Hancock (Omega 1951), United States House of Representatives for Missouri
- Dick Hantak (Alpha Phi 1960) American football official in the National Football League
- O. Glen Hocker (Beta 1920), co-founder of Dairy Queen
- Author Hughes Jr. (Alpha Alpha 1951), president of the University of San Diego
- James E. Johnson, Medal of Honor recipient
- James Kirkpatrick (Alpha 1929) former Missouri Secretary of State
- Benjamin T. Laney (Sigma 1934), former Governor of Arkansas
- William Madia (Pi), scientist and laboratory director
- Andy Mayberry, former member of the Arkansas House of Representatives
- Dennis Miller (Gamma Upsilon), comedian
- Red Miller (Alpha Delta) former head coach of the Denver Broncos
- Gil Morgan (Tau 1968), professional golfer
- June P. Morgan (Theta 1938), chief justice of the Supreme Court of Missouri
- Stan Musial (Beta Iota, honorary) Major League Baseball Hall of Fame and Presidential Medal of Freedom recipient
- Sheffield Nelson (Sigma 1962) chairman and CEO of Arkansas-Louisiana Gas Company, candidate for Governor of Arkansas
- Carlos C. Ogden (Alpha Alpha), Medal of Honor recipient
- Brian Rasel, Pennsylvania House of Representatives
- Ronald Roskens (Alpha Eta 1954), president of the University of Nebraska system
- Timothy Seip, former member of the Pennsylvania House of Representatives
- Thomas Shaw, Episcopal priest of the fifteenth Bishop of Massachusetts
- Bill W. Stacy (Alpha Phi 1960), founding president of California State University San Marcos and served as chancellor of the University of Tennessee at Chattanooga
- Harry Stephens (Delta 1961) Kansas Senate and vice president emeritus of student affairs for Emporia State University
- Pinky Tomlin (Mu), singer, songwriter, bandleader, and actor
- George J. Trautman III (Alpha Psi), Lt. General in the United States Marine Corps and deputy commandant for aviation
- Clyde A. Vaughn (Alpha Phi 1968) United States Army Lieutenant General who served as director of the Army National Guard
- Lawrence Walkup (Alpha 1936), president of Northern Arizona University
- Tom White, football official in the United States Football League and the National Football League
- Myron A. Wright (Gamma 1932), chairman of the board of Exxon Oil and Refining Co.
- Lloyd P. Young, president of what is now Keene State College
- Jack Zduriencik, general manager of the Seattle Mariners

== See also ==
- List of Sigma Tau Gamma
- List of social fraternities and sororities
