= 9ff =

Car tuning company

Coordinates: 51.5324°N 7.6236°E

9FF engineering GmbH
- Type: Public
- Industry: Automotive
- Founded: 2001
- Headquarters: Dortmund, Germany
- Key people: Jan Fatthauer
- Products: Automobiles, Automotive parts
- Website: 9ff.com

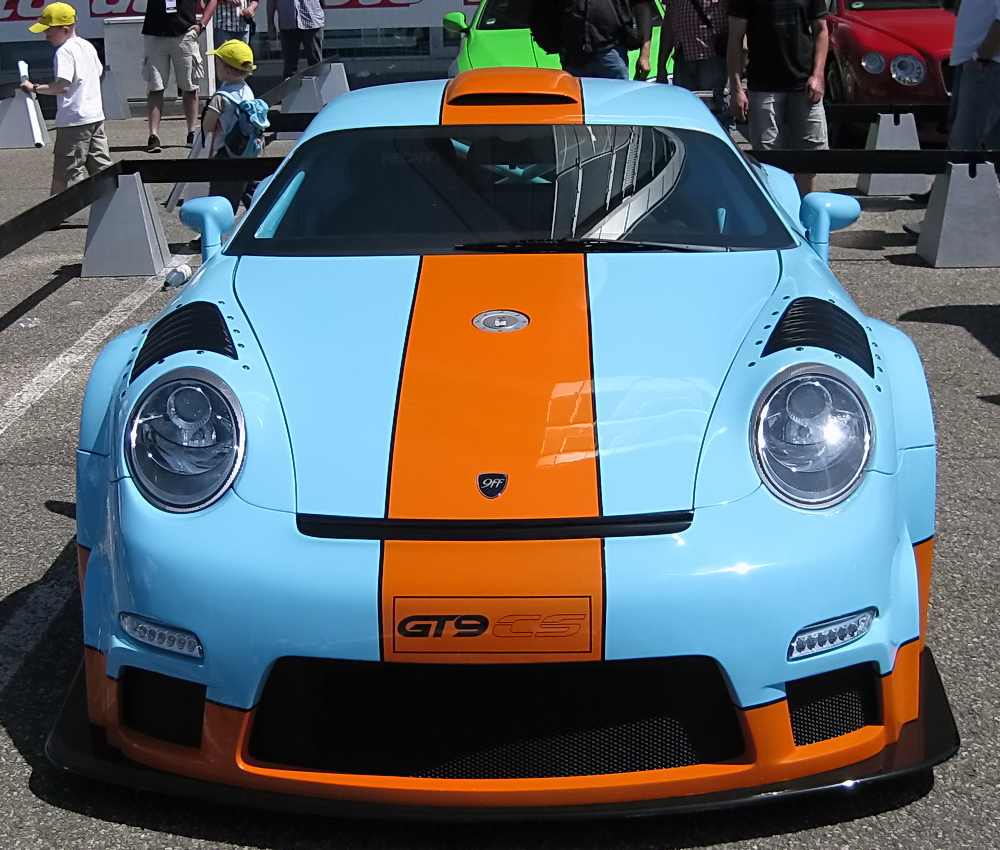
A 9ff GT9-CS in 2012

9ff is a German car tuning company based in Dortmund. It was founded by Jan Fatthauer in 2001. It specializes in converting stock Porsches into street legal racing vehicles, either as fully tuned cars, or by selling individual parts or kits. The company is best known for building one of the first cars to exceed 400 km/h (249 mph), the GT9, capable of 256 mph (412 km/h). The former company, 9ff Fahrzeugtechnik GmbH, filed for bankruptcy in September 2013. A new company, 9ff Engineering GmbH was founded in October 2013.

== History ==
=== Early years ===
Jan Fatthauer founded 9ff Fahrzeugtechnik GmbH in 2001 in Dortmund, Germany, as a Porsche tuning company. Fatthauer earned a degree in automotive engineering, and had worked at recognized tuners until 2001.

In May 2004, 9ff achieved its first record, reaching 372 km/h (231 mph) with a 9ff T6 on the Nardo Ring race track in Nardo, Italy. The company claimed that they had the "fastest Porsche in Nardo". In December of that year, Fatthauer drove a new car, the 9ff V400, up to 388 km/h (241 mph). This car held the record for the world's fastest car until the company beat that record with the GT9 later that year. At the time, 9ff was building a wide variety of products, including some powered by alternative fuel, setting several records.

In September 2006, the 9ff TRC-85 reached 380.5 km/h (236.4 mph), becoming the fastest street-legal convertible of its time.

In October 2008, the 9ff CT78, based on the Porsche Cayman, won the top-speed record for cars powered by alternative fuel, with its top speed of 347 km/h (216 mph), powered by bioethanol.

On April 10, 2008, the 9ff GT9 reached 407 km/h (253 mph) (confirmed with GPS), becoming the fastest street-legal car in the world.

In 2009, 9ff unveiled the Speed9, the second car entirely built by 9ff. The Speed9 is a classic roadster that has a lower windshield and cleaner horizontal lines than the 1955 Porsche 356/1 500S Speedster and the 911 and 964 Speedster (1989 and 1993 respectively) that it is based on. The same year, the 9ff TR1000 became the fastest Porsche 911 in the world on the racing circuit in Papenburg, with a top speed of 391.7 km/h (243.4 mph).

In early 2010, 9ff introduced the twin-turbocharged version of the Porsche GT3 and the Porsche GT3RS, through its new tuning program, the GTurbo. Two turbochargers were added to upgrade the vehicle's horsepower to 750, 850 or 1,000 hp. 9ff added new bumpers front and rear, side skirts, new quarter panels, and extra vents. With the 1,000 hp option, the car could reach 100 km/h (62 mph) in 2.9 seconds, with a top speed of 392 km/h (244 mph). The company also upgraded the direct-injection Porsche Turbo.

=== Bankruptcy ===
In 2013 9ff filed for bankruptcy, along with Gumpert, Wiesmann, Artega and Lola. This has been attributed to a decline in business as Porsche drew in more customers seeking unmodified cars. A new company, 9ff Engineering GmbH, was founded in October of the same year.

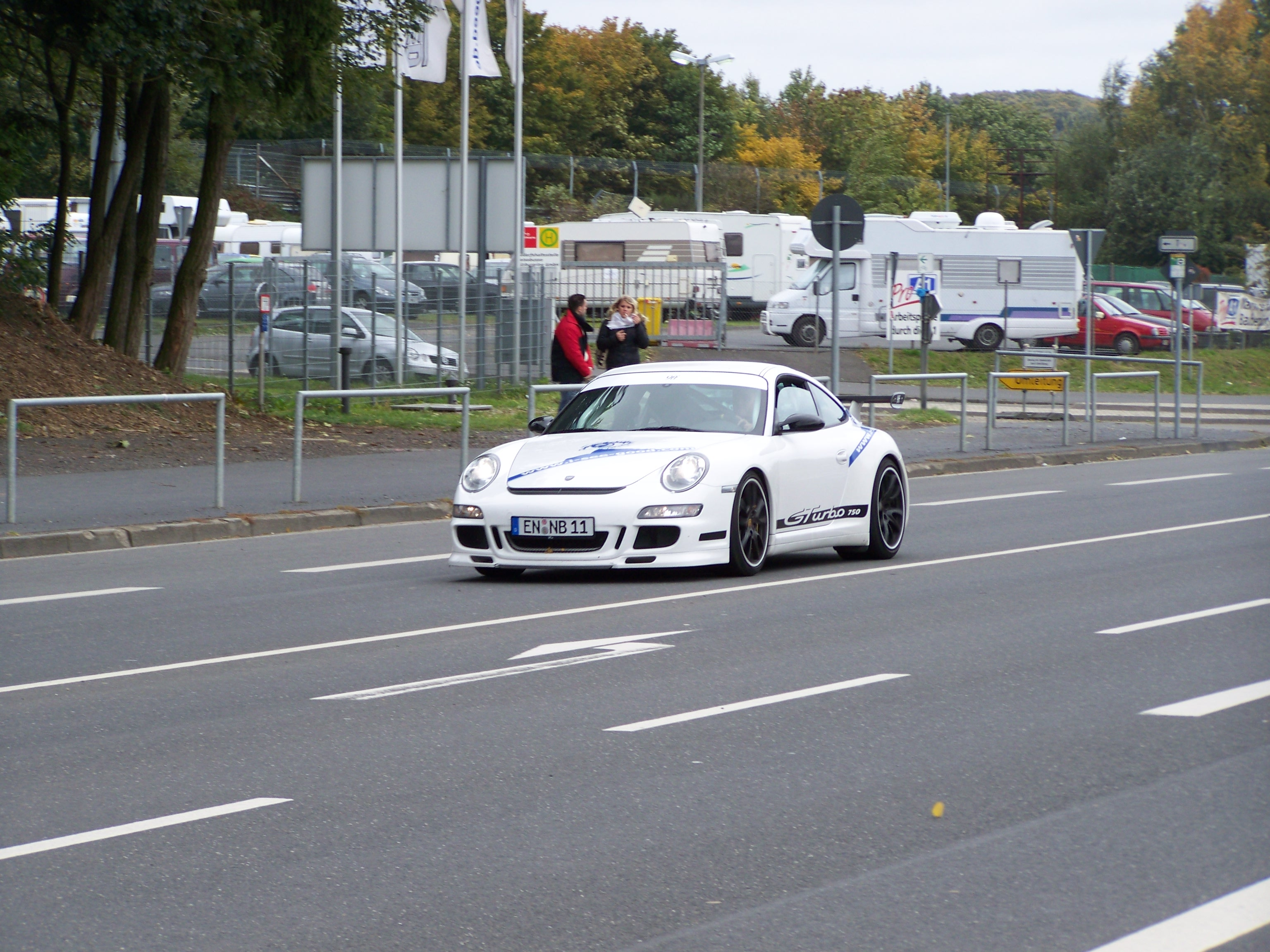
The 750 PS (740 bhp; 550 kW) 9ff GTurbo 750, based on the 2006 Porsche 997 GT3 RS

== Models ==
Production (2019):

- 9ff GTurbo
- 9ff GTronic
- 9ff GT9
- 9ff Speed9

Discontinued models (partial list):

- 9ff T6
- 9ffV400
- 9ff TRC-85
- 9ff TRC-91
