= Tomark =

Tomark s.r.o.
- Company type: Společnost s ručením omezeným
- Industry: Aerospace
- Founded: 1995
- Headquarters: Prešov, Slovakia
- Products: Ultralight aircraft
- Divisions: TomarkAero
- Website: tomarkaero.com

Tomark s.r.o. is a Slovak aircraft manufacturer based in Prešov and founded in 1995. The company specializes in the design and manufacture of ready-to-fly ultralight aircraft.

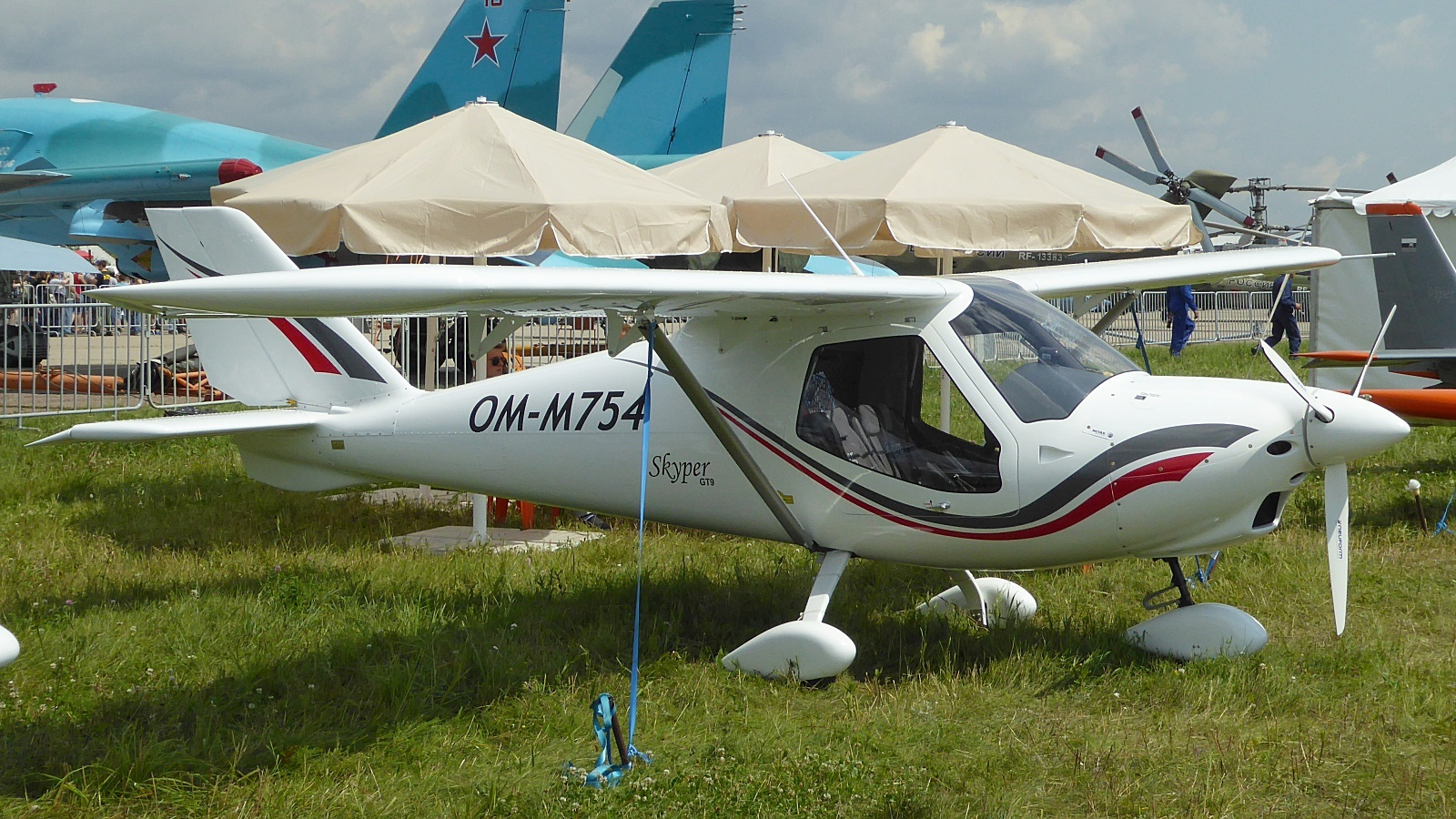
Tomark Skyper GT9

The company is a Společnost s ručením omezeným (sro), a Slovak private limited company. It was started as a mechanical engineering company working in such industries as automotive production and has a division, TomarkAero, that produces the aircraft designs.

The company's first design was the Tomark Viper SD4, a low-wing, two-seat aircraft that was first flown on 1 November 2006 and accepted by the American Federal Aviation Administration as an approved special light-sport aircraft in 2010.

The second design, the Tomark Skyper GT9, is a high-wing, two seat ultralight, designed for flight training and touring, introduced in 2014. It was designed for the Fédération Aéronautique Internationale microlight rules and US light-sport aircraft rules and complies with the Czech UL2-1 and ELSA as well as German LTF-UL rules.

== Aircraft ==
Summary of aircraft built by Tomark:

- Tomark Viper SD4 – introduced 2007
- Tomark Skyper GT9 – introduced 2014
