= List of Sigma Tau Gamma chapters =

Sigma Tau Gamma is college social fraternity in North America. It was established at the University of Central Missouri in 1920. It has collegiate chapters, alumni chapters, and alumni associations.

== Collegiate chapters ==
In the following list, active chapters are indicated in bold and inactive chapters and institutions are in italics.

No.	Chapter	Charter date and range	Institution	City	State or province	Status	Ref.
1	**Alpha**	June 28, 1920	University of Central Missouri	Warrensburg	Missouri	Active	
2	**Beta**	July 30, 1921	Truman State University	Kirksville	Missouri	Active	
3	Gamma	March 12, 1927 – 1962	Northwestern Oklahoma State University	Alva	Oklahoma	Inactive	(Note: The chapter designation was changed to GAMMA by the third Conclave in 1927.)
4	**Delta**	January 20, 1922	Emporia State University	Emporia	Kansas	Active	
5	**Epsilon**	May 3, 1924	Pittsburg State University	Pittsburg	Kansas	Active	
6	**Zeta**	May 10, 1924 – 1990; November 2018- present	Northeastern State University	Tahlequah	Oklahoma	Active	
7	Eta	January 22, 1926 – 1983	Fort Hays State University	Hays	Kansas	Inactive	
8	**Theta**	April 2, 1927 – 2011; March 15, 2015 – 201x ?; 2019	Northwest Missouri State University	Maryville	Missouri	Active	
9	Iota	November 12, 1927 – 1947; January 31, 1971 – 1987; January 31, 1994 – 2014	Kent State University	Kent	Ohio	Inactive	
10	**Kappa**	April 28, 1928 – 1970: 2007 – November 10, 2012	University of Wisconsin–Whitewater	Whitewater	Wisconsin	Active	
11	Lambda	November 11, 1928 – 2005	Black Hills State University	Spearfish	South Dakota	Inactive	(Note: The fraternity attempted to reestablish Lambda, creating an associate chapter in 2016, but this group did not charter.)
12	**Mu**	January 12, 1929	Southeastern Oklahoma State University	Durant	Oklahoma	Active	
13	Nu	January 19, 1929 – 1991	Northwestern State University of Louisiana	Natchitoches	Louisiana	Inactive	
14	Xi	March 23, 1929 – 1980; April 9, 1994 – 2011	Fairmont State University	Fairmont	West Virginia	Inactive	
15	Omicron	April 26, 1930 – 1994	Ball State University	Muncie	Indiana	Inactive	
16	Pi	November 8, 1930 – 1986: April 21, 2001 – 2010	Indiana University of Pennsylvania	Indiana	Pennsylvania	Inactive	
17	Rho	February 7, 1933 – 1954; April 28, 1979.– 1995	Buffalo State College	Buffalo	New York	Inactive	
18	**Sigma**	November 30, 1934	University of Central Arkansas	Conway	Arkansas	Active	
19	**Tau**	April 2, 1938 – 1956; 1963 – 2020; 202x ?	East Central University	Ada	Oklahoma	Active	
20	**Upsilon**	December 17, 1938	University of Arkansas at Monticello	Monticello	Arkansas	Active	
21	**Phi**	May 27, 1939	Southeastern Louisiana University	Hammond	Louisiana	Active	
22	**Chi**	December 19, 1940 –1970; Fall 2017	Western Michigan University	Kalamazoo	Michigan	Active	
23	**Psi**	January 31, 1941 – 1974; January 20, 1990	Central Michigan University	Mount Pleasant	Michigan	Active	
24	**Omega**	May 18, 1941 – 1987: Fall 2017	Missouri State University	Springfield	Missouri	Active	
25	Alpha Alpha	November 1, 1941 – 1990	Eastern Illinois University	Charleston	Illinois	Inactive	
26	Alpha Beta	October 10, 1942 – 1975	Harris–Stowe State University	St. Louis	Missouri	Inactive	
27	Alpha Gamma	January 7, 1943 – 1956	University of California, Santa Barbara	Santa Barbara	California	Inactive	
28	Alpha Delta	February 13, 1943 – 1967; October 28, 1995 – 2011	Western Illinois University	Macomb	Illinois	Inactive	
29	**Alpha Epsilon**	March 23, 1946 – 2010; 2018	Henderson State University	Arkadelphia	Arkansas	Active	
30	Alpha Zeta	May 19, 1946 – 1972; October 27, 1991 – 2002	Clarion University of Pennsylvania	Clarion	Pennsylvania	Inactive	
31	Alpha Eta	October 18, 1947 – 1978	University of Northern Iowa	Cedar Falls	Iowa	Inactive	(Note: Chapter formed from the Xanho local fraternity, established c. 1900.)
32	Alpha Theta	March 20, 1948 – 1975; February 3, 1996 – 2007	Eastern Michigan University	Ypsilanti	Michigan	Inactive	
33	Alpha Iota	May 29, 1948 – 1954	Keene State College	Keene	New Hampshire	Inactive	
34	Alpha Kappa	October 28, 1948 – 2017	University of Wisconsin–Stout	Menomonie	Wisconsin	Inactive	
35	Alpha Lambda	May 7, 1949 – 1977; 19xx ? – 202x ?	Concord University	Athens	West Virginia	Inactive	
36	Alpha Mu	April 28, 1950 – 1982	Chadron State College	Chadron	Nebraska	Inactive	
37	Alpha Nu	April 29, 1950 – 1954; April 29, 1989 – 1999	State University of New York at Oneonta	Oneonta	New York	Inactive	
38	Alpha Xi	May 13, 1950 – 1956	Glenville State College	Glenville	West Virginia	Inactive	
39	Alpha Omicron	April 14, 1951 – 1954	State University of New York at Oswego	Oswego	New York	Inactive	
40	Alpha Pi	May 26, 1951 – 1955	Wayne State University	Detroit	Michigan	Inactive	
41	Alpha Rho	June 2, 1951 – 1954	State University of New York at New Paltz	New Paltz	New York	Inactive	
42	Alpha Sigma	June 2, 1951 – 1962; April 18, 1970 – 1997	Southern Illinois University	Carbondale	Illinois	Inactive	
43	Alpha Tau	March 15, 1952 – 1954	State University of New York at Cortland	Cortland	New York	Inactive	
44	Alpha Upsilon	May 28, 1952 – 1956	Marietta College	Marietta	Ohio	Inactive	
45	**Alpha Phi**	December 6, 1952	Southeast Missouri State University	Cape Girardeau	Missouri	Active	
46	**Alpha Chi**	May 9, 1953 - 2023	University of Illinois at Urbana–Champaign	Champaign	Illinois	Inactive	
47	Alpha Psi	October 12, 1956 – 202x ?	Pennsylvania State University	University Park	Pennsylvania	Inactive	(Note: Chapter suspected through August 1, 2024, for hazing and alcohol and/or drug violations.)
48	**Alpha Omega**	October 10, 1956	Missouri University of Science and Technology	Rolla	Missouri	Active	
49	**Beta Alpha**	October 18, 1958 – 1962; November 7, 1981 –1988; November 23, 1991 – 2002; 200x ? – 201x ?; 2017	University of Missouri	Columbia	Missouri	Active	(Note: Charter suspended from 1999 to 2001.)
50	Beta Beta	January 31, 1959 – 1988	Alliance College	Cambridge Springs	Pennsylvania	Inactive	(Note: Chapter closed when the college closed in 1988.)
51	**Beta Gamma**	February 7, 1959 – 1976; April 7, 2001	Youngstown State University	Youngstown	Ohio	Active	
52	Beta Delta	February 22, 1959 – 1977	University of Wisconsin–Eau Claire	Eau Claire	Wisconsin	Inactive	
53	Beta Epsilon	March 7, 1959 – 1999	Shippensburg University of Pennsylvania	Shippensburg	Pennsylvania	Inactive	
54	**Beta Zeta**	May 10, 1959	University of Central Oklahoma	Edmond	Oklahoma	Active	
55	Beta Eta	October 4, 1959 – 1966	Alma College	Alma	Michigan	Inactive	
56	**Beta Theta**	October 8, 1959 –1965: April 5, 1986 – 1998; March 24, 2013	Purdue University	West Lafayette	Indiana	Active	
57	**Beta Iota**	November 14, 1959 – 1979; 19xx ? – 1996; 2011	Pennsylvania Western University, California	California	Pennsylvania	Active	(Note: Chapter formed at California State College, now Pennsylvania Western University, California.)
58	**Beta Kappa**	February 28, 1960 – 1986; April 12, 1997.	University of Wisconsin–La Crosse	La Crosse	Wisconsin	Active	
59	Beta Lambda	February 28, 1960 – 1968; December 12, 1970 – 2013	Valparaiso University	Valparaiso	Indiana	Inactive	
60	Beta Mu	March 12, 1960 – 1980	University of Wisconsin–Oshkosh	Oshkosh	Wisconsin	Inactive	
61	Beta Nu	March 19, 1960 – 1983	University of Louisiana at Monroe	Monroe	Louisiana	Inactive	
62	**Beta Xi**	May 7, 1960 – 1987; November 23, 2013	Winona State University	Winona	Minnesota	Active	
63	Beta Omicron	May 8, 1960 – 1983	Northland College	Ashland	Wisconsin	Inactive	
64	Beta Pi	May 21, 1960 – 1971; April 12, 1986 – 1999; 2016–2021	Frostburg State University	Frostburg	Maryland	Inactive	
65	Beta Rho	October 29, 1960 – 2019	Minnesota State University Moorhead	Moorhead	Minnesota	Inactive	
66	Beta Sigma	October 12, 1960 – 1974	St. Cloud State University	St. Cloud	Minnesota	Inactive	
67	Beta Tau	March 11, 1961 – 1971; April 23, 1993	Slippery Rock University of Pennsylvania	Slippery Rock	Pennsylvania	Inactive	
68	**Beta Upsilon**	December 3, 1961	Cleveland State University	Cleveland	Ohio	Active	
69	Beta Phi	March 11, 1962 – 1992	Southwestern Oklahoma State University	Weatherford	Oklahoma	Inactive	
70	**Beta Chi**	May 12, 1962	University of Nebraska at Kearney	Kearney	Nebraska	Active	
71	Beta Psi	April 12, 1964 – 1986	University of Wisconsin–Superior	Superior	Wisconsin	Inactive	
72	Beta Omega	October 11, 1964	Edinboro University of Pennsylvania	Edinboro	Pennsylvania	Inactive	
73	Gamma Alpha	February 15, 1965 – 2017	Mansfield University of Pennsylvania	Mansfield	Pennsylvania	Inactive	
74	**Gamma Beta**	May 15, 1965	University of Wisconsin–Stevens Point	Stevens Point	Wisconsin	Active	
75	Gamma Gamma	January 15, 1966 – 1970; March 22, 1986 – 2003	St. Norbert College	West De Pere	Wisconsin	Inactive	
76	Gamma Delta	May 28, 1966 – 1988	Minot State University	Minot	North Dakota	Inactive	
77	Gamma Epsilon	May 4, 1968 – 1976	West Chester University of Pennsylvania	West Chester	Pennsylvania	Inactive	
78	Gamma Zeta	September 21, 1968 – 1979	Northern Arizona University	Flagstaff	Arizona	Inactive	
79	Gamma Eta	October 15, 1968 – 1999	Seton Hall University	South Orange	New Jersey	Inactive	
80	**Gamma Theta**	December 14, 1968	University of Missouri–St. Louis	St. Louis	Missouri	Active	
81	Gamma Iota	January 18, 1969 – 1970	University of Windsor	Windsor	Ontario, Canada	Inactive	
82	Gamma Kappa	March 22, 1969 – 1971	Nicholls State University	Thibodaux	Louisiana	Inactive	
83	Gamma Lambda	March 29, 1969 – 1978; April 23, 1988 – 1993	Wayne State College	Wayne	Nebraska	Inactive	
84	Gamma Mu	April 26, 1969 – 1991	University of Missouri–Kansas City	Kansas City	Missouri	Inactive	
85	Gamma Nu	May 17, 1969 – 1978; May 8, 1992 – 2010	University of Wisconsin–River Falls	River Falls	Wisconsin	Inactive	
86	**Gamma Xi**	May 18, 1969	University of Wisconsin–Platteville	Platteville	Wisconsin	Active	
87	Gamma Omicron	March 13, 1970 – 2005	Salem International University	Salem	West Virginia	Inactive	
88	**Gamma Pi**	October 14, 1970	Stephen F. Austin State University	Nacogdoches	Texas	Active	
89	Gamma Rho	April 15, 1972 – 1978; 1991 – April 27, 1996	Cameron University	Lawton	Oklahoma	Inactive	
90	Gamma Sigma	April 30, 1972 – 1987	University of Nebraska Omaha	Omaha	Nebraska	Inactive	
91	**Gamma Tau**	May 6, 1972	Millersville University of Pennsylvania	Millersville	Pennsylvania	Active	
92	Gamma Upsilon	April 14, 1973 – 1993	Point Park University	Pittsburgh	Pennsylvania	Inactive	
93	**Gamma Phi**	May 19, 1973 – 1998; 2010 – February 17, 2013	University of Southern Indiana	Evansville	Indiana	Active	
94	**Gamma Chi**	April 20, 1974	Michigan Technological University	Houghton	Michigan	Active	
95	Gamma Psi	October 18, 1975 – 2013	Illinois State University	Normal	Illinois	Inactive	
96	Gamma Omega	March 25, 1977 – 2007	Baylor University	Waco	Texas	Inactive	
97	**Delta Alpha**	April 14, 1978 – 1998; 2009 – November 2011	East Carolina University	Greenville	North Carolina	Active	
98	Delta Beta	April 14, 1978 – 2021	Duquesne University	Pittsburgh	Pennsylvania	Inactive	
99	Delta Gamma	April 22, 1978 – 1988	University of Texas at Austin	Austin	Texas	Inactive	
100	Delta Delta	March 31, 1979 – 1987	University of North Carolina at Greensboro	Greensboro	North Carolina	Inactive	
101	Delta Epsilon	April 16, 1983 – 2019	Texas State University	San Marcos	Texas	Inactive	
102	Delta Zeta	February 4, 1984 – 1993	Virginia Commonwealth University	Richmond	Virginia	Inactive	
103	Delta Eta	October 27, 1984 – 1992	University of Arkansas	Fayetteville	Arkansas	Inactive	
104	Delta Theta	February 8, 1985 – 2004	University of North Texas	Denton	Texas	Inactive	
105	Delta Iota	May 9, 1985 – 2004	Southern Arkansas University	Magnolia	Arkansas	Inactive	
106	Delta Kappa	March 23, 1985 – 1990	Missouri Western State University	St. Joseph	Missouri	Inactive	
107	Delta Lambda	April 13, 1985 – 1994	University of Iowa	Iowa City	Iowa	Inactive	
108	Delta Mu	November 2, 1985 – 1998	University of Akron	Akron	Ohio	Inactive	
109	Delta Nu	November 23, 1985 – 2006	Sam Houston State University	Huntsville	Texas	Inactive	
110	Delta Xi	March 14, 1987 – 2016	Carnegie Mellon University	Pittsburgh	Pennsylvania	Inactive	
111	Delta Omicron	May 24, 1987 – 2016	Christopher Newport University	Newport News	Virginia	Inactive	
112	**Delta Pi**	March 18, 1988 – 2001; 2006 – April 11, 2009	University of Pittsburgh at Johnstown	Johnstown	Pennsylvania	Active	
113	Delta Rho	April 7, 1989 – 2012	Miami University	Oxford	Ohio	Inactive	
114	Delta Sigma	April 8, 1989 – 1998	University of South Florida	Tampa	Florida	Inactive	
115	Delta Tau	April 7, 1990 – 2019	Indiana State University	Terre Haute	Indiana	Inactive	
116	**Delta Upsilon**	April 7, 1990	Penn State Erie, The Behrend College	Erie	Pennsylvania	Active	
117	**Delta Phi**	November 19, 1991	Fitchburg State University	Fitchburg	Massachusetts	Active	
118	Delta Chi	April 25, 1992 – 1999	Bridgewater State University	Bridgewater	Massachusetts	Inactive	
119	**Delta Psi**	March 27, 1993 – 2006; March 14, 2020	Robert Morris University	Coraopolis	Pennsylvania	Active	
120	Delta Omega	April 17, 1993 – 1999	State University of New York at Albany	Albany	New York	Inactive	
121	Epsilon Alpha	October 2, 1993 – 2006	MacMurray College	Jacksonville	Illinois	Inactive	
122	Epsilon Beta	November 13, 1993 – 1996	University of Texas at San Antonio	San Antonio	Texas	Inactive	
123	Epsilon Gamma	April 9, 1994 – 1997	University of Oklahoma	Norman	Oklahoma	Inactive	
124	**Epsilon Delta**	April 22, 1995	University of Massachusetts Lowell	Lowell	Massachusetts	Active	
125	Epsilon Epsilon	April 29, 1995 – 2002	Gannon University	Erie	Pennsylvania	Inactive	
126	Epsilon Zeta	January 27, 1996 – 202x ?	Embry–Riddle Aeronautical University	Prescott	Arizona	Inactive	
127	Epsilon Eta	May 4, 1996 – 1999	Murray State University	Murray	Kentucky	Inactive	
128	**Epsilon Theta**	May 2, 1998	Plymouth State University	Plymouth	New Hampshire	Active	
129	Epsilon Iota	May 1, 1999 – 2005	The College of New Jersey	Ewing Township	New Jersey	Inactive	
130	Epsilon Kappa	April 30, 1999 – 2012	University of Massachusetts Dartmouth	Dartmouth	Massachusetts	Inactive	
131	**Epsilon Lambda**	April 8, 2000	State University of New York at Plattsburgh	Plattsburgh	New York	Active	
132	**Epsilon Mu**	March 6, 2004	Marshall University	Huntington	West Virginia	Active	
133	Epsilon Nu	April 23, 2004 – 2007	University of South Carolina Aiken	Aiken	South Carolina	Inactive	
134	**Epsilon Xi**	April 23, 2005	Saint Louis University	St. Louis	Missouri	Active	
135	**Epsilon Omicron**	April 23, 2005	Monmouth University	West Long Branch	New Jersey	Active	
136	**Epsilon Pi**	April 19, 2008	State University of New York at Buffalo	Buffalo	New York	Inactive	
137	**Epsilon Rho**	May 8, 2010	Salisbury University	Salisbury	Maryland	Active	
138	**Epsilon Sigma**	March 30, 2012	Southern Illinois University Edwardsville	Edwardsville	Illinois	Active	
139	**Epsilon Tau**	March 17, 2013	University of North Carolina at Charlotte	Charlotte	North Carolina	Active	
140	**Epsilon Upsilon**	October 20, 2013	Virginia Polytechnic Institute and State University	Blacksburg	Virginia	Active	
141	**Epsilon Phi**	November 2, 2013	University of Alabama	Tuscaloosa	Alabama	Active	
142	**Epsilon Chi**	February 1, 2014	Auburn University	Auburn	Alabama	Active	
143	Epsilon Psi	April 27, 2014 – 2020	Oklahoma State University–Stillwater	Stillwater	Oklahoma	Inactive	
144	Epsilon Omega	February 28, 2015 – 202x ?	Florida Institute of Technology	Melbourne	Florida	Inactive	
145	**Zeta Alpha**	August 29, 2015	Arizona State University	Tempe	Arizona	Active	
146	**Zeta Beta**	January 23, 2016	University of Cincinnati	Cincinnati	Ohio	Active	
147	Zeta Gamma		University of Massachusetts Amherst	Amherst	Massachusetts	Inactive	
148	Zeta Delta		Penn State Altoona	Altoona	Pennsylvania	Inactive	
149	Zeta Epsilon		Appalachian State University	Boone	North Carolina	Inactive	
150	Zeta Zeta		University of North Carolina at Pembroke	Pembroke	North Carolina	Inactive	
151	Zeta Eta		Rogers State University	Claremore	Oklahoma	Inactive	
152	Zeta Theta		University of Washington	Seattle	Washington	Inactive	
153	Zeta Iota	August 20, 2016 – 2020	Washington State University	Pullman	Washington	Inactive	
154	**Zeta Kappa**	November 12, 2016	Kansas State University	Manhattan	Kansas	Active	
155	**Zeta Lambda**	October 20, 2018	University of Nevada, Reno	Reno	Nevada	Active	
156	**Zeta Mu**	April 24, 2016	William Woods University	Fulton	Missouri	Active	
157	Zeta Nu	September 9, 2017 – 2020	Lindenwood University–Belleville	Belleville	Illinois	Inactive	(Note: Lindenwood University's Belleville satellite campus closed in 2020.)
158	Zeta Xi		Coastal Carolina University	Conway	South Carolina	Inactive	
159	**Zeta Omicron**	October 14, 2017	Michigan State University	East Lansing	Michigan	Active	
160	**Zeta Pi**	April 7, 2018	University of Arizona	Tucson	Arizona	Active	
161	Zeta Rho Associate		University of California, Merced	Merced	California	Inactive	
162	**Zeta Sigma**	November 17, 2019	Colorado State University	Fort Collins	Colorado	Active	
163	Zeta Tau Associate		Iowa State University	Ames	Iowa	Inactive	
164	Zeta Upsilon		University of Nebraska–Lincoln	Lincoln	Nebraska	Inactive	
165	**Zeta Phi**	April 22, 2022	Carroll University	Waukesha	Wisconsin	Active	
166	Zeta Chi Associate		Metropolitan State University of Denver	Denver	Colorado	Inactive	
167	**Zeta Psi**	October 17, 2021	University of Colorado Boulder	Boulder	Colorado	Active	
168	Zeta Omega Associate		Ohio State University	Columbus	Ohio	Inactive	
169	Eta Alpha		Kutztown University of Pennsylvania	Kutztown	Pennsylvania	Inactive	
170	Eta Beta		University of Montana	Missoula	Montana	Inactive	
171	Eta Gamma		University of Louisville	Louisville	Kentucky	Inactive	
172	Eta Delta		University of Georgia	Athens	Georgia	Inactive	
173	Eta Epsilon		Texas Tech University	Lubbock	Texas	Inactive	
174	Eta Zeta		University of Pittsburgh at Greensburg	Greensburg	Pennsylvania	Inactive	
175	Eta Eta		Northern Michigan University	Marquette	Michigan	Inactive	
176	Eta Theta		Temple University	Philadelphia	Pennsylvania	Inactive	
177	Eta Iota		Rutgers University	New Brunswick	New Jersey	Inactive	
178	Eta Kappa Associate		University of Alabama Birmingham	Birmingham	Alabama	Inactive	
179	**Eta Lambda Associate**		University of Maryland College Park	College Park	Maryland	Active	
180	Eta Mu Associate		University of Kansas	Lawrence	Kansas	Inactive	
181	Eta Nu Associate		University of Wisconsin-Madison	Madison	Wisconsin	Inactive	
182	Eta Xi					Inactive	
183	Eta Omicron					Inactive	
184	Eta Pi		Wright State University	Dayton	Ohio	Inactive	
185	Eta Rho		Florida State University	Tallahassee	Florida	Inactive	
186	Eta Sigma		University of Florida	Gainesville	Florida	Inactive	
187	Eta Tau		West Virginia State University	Institute	West Virginia	Inactive	
188	Eta Upsilon		Francis Marion University	Florence	South Carolina	Inactive	
189	Eta Phi		Averett University	Danville	Virginia	Inactive	
190	Eta Chi		Boise State University	Boise	Idaho	Inactive	
191	Eta Psi		Eastern Oregon University	La Grande	Oregon	Inactive	
192	Eta Omega		Northern State University	Aberdeen	South Dakota	Inactive	

== Alumni associations ==
In the following list, active chapters are indicated in bold and inactive chapters are in italics.

Association	University	Location	Status	Ref.
Alpha Alumni Association	University of Central Missouri	Warrensburg, Missouri	Active	
Beta Alumni Association	Truman State University	Kirksville, Missouri	Active	
Epsilon Alumni Association	Pittsburg State University	Pittsburg, Kansas	Active	
Zeta Alumni Association	Northeastern State University	Tahlequah, Oklahoma	Active	
Alpha Lambda Alumni Association	Concord University	Athens, West Virginia	Active	
Alpha Phi Alumni Association	Southeast Missouri State University	Cape Girardeau, Missouri	Active	
Beta Gamma Alumni Association	Youngstown State University	Youngstown, Ohio	Active	
Beta Iota Alumni Association	Pennsylvania Western University, California	California, Pennsylvania	Active	
Beta Kappa Alumni Association	University of Wisconsin–La Crosse	La Crosse, Wisconsin	Active	
Beta Lambda Alumni Association	Valparaiso University	Valparaiso, Indiana	Active	
Beta Pi Alumni Association	Frostburg State University	Frostburg, Maryland	Active	
Beta Upsilon Alumni Association	Cleveland State University	Cleveland, Ohio	Active	
Gamma Alpha Alumni Association	Mansfield University of Pennsylvania	Mansfield, Pennsylvania	Active	
Gamma Theta Alumni Association	University of Missouri–St. Louis	St. Louis, Missouri	Active	
Gamma Pi Alumni Association	Stephen F. Austin State University	Nacogdoches, Texas	Active	
Gamma Rho Alumni Association	Cameron University	Lawton, Oklahoma	Active	
Gamma Tau Alumni Association	Millersville University of Pennsylvania	Millersville, Pennsylvania	Active	
Gamma Phi Alumni Association	University of Southern Indiana	Evansville, Indiana	Active	
Delta Delta Alumni Association	University of North Carolina at Greensboro	Greensboro, North Carolina	Active	
Delta Theta Alumni Association	University of North Texas	Denton, Texas	Active	
Delta Tau Alumni Association	Indiana State University	Terre Haute, Indiana	Active	
Epsilon Delta Alumni Association	University of Massachusetts Lowell	Lowell, Massachusetts	Active	
Epsilon Eta Alumni Association	Murray State University	Murray, Kentucky	Active	
Epsilon Rho Alumni Association	Salisbury University	Salisbury, Maryland	Active	
Epsilon Psi Alumni Association	Oklahoma State University–Stillwater	Stillwater, Oklahoma	Active	

== Alumni chapters ==
State	City	Status	Ref.
Louisiana	New Orleans	Active	
