= 1st Marine Expeditionary Brigade =

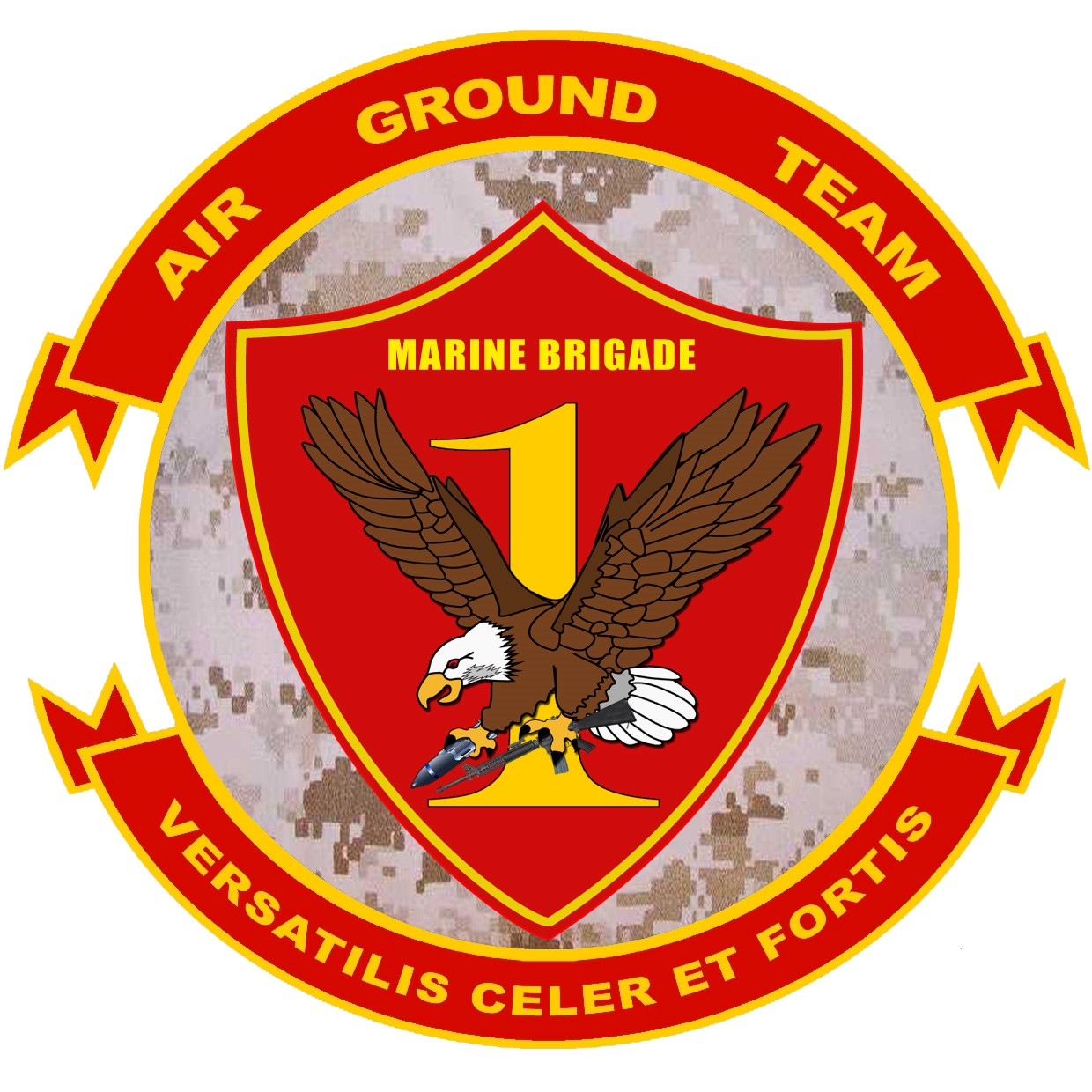
- 1st MEB insignia
- Country: United States
- Allegiance: United States of America
- Branch: United States Marine Corps
- Garrison/HQ: Marine Corps Base Camp Pendleton

Commanders
- Notable commanders: George R. E. Shell; Frederick L. Wieseman; Richard G. Weede; Keith B. McCutcheon; Carl A. Youngdale; Marion E. Carl; George W. Smith; James Mattis; George J. Trautman III

1st Marine Expeditionary Brigade (1st MEB) was a formation most recently assigned to I Marine Expeditionary Force (I MEF). First established as 1st Brigade (1901-1914), the brigade has also been activated as 1st Marine Brigade (1947-1949), 1st Provisional Marine Brigade (1950), 1st Provisional Marine Air-Ground Task Force (1953-1956), 1st Marine Brigade (1956-1985), 1st Marine Amphibious Brigade (1985-1988), and 1st Marine Expeditionary Brigade (1988-1994, 1999-2017).

== History ==
The brigade was stationed at Kaneohe Bay Marine Corps Air Station (MCAS) from 1956 (when the 1st Provisional Marine Air Ground Task Force was redesignated as the 1st Marine Brigade), until 30 September 1994, when the brigade was deactivated. In 1960 and again in 1964, the brigade participated in large-scale exercises in Taiwan; and in 1990 the 1st Marine Expeditionary Brigade deployed to Southwest Asia during Operation Desert Shield.

From 1956 to 1985 while at Kaneohe MCAS, (now known as Marine Corps Base Hawaii), the unit was designated as the 1st Marine Brigade. From 1985 until 1988, the brigade was designated as the 1st Marine Amphibious Brigade and was then redesignated as the 1st Marine Expeditionary Brigade. From 1971, in addition to the Brigade Headquarters Group as its Command Element (CE), the 1st Marine Brigade consisted of the 3rd Marine Regiment (from 1956 until 1965 the 4th Marine Regiment filled this role in the brigade) as its Ground Combat Element (GCE), Marine Aircraft Group 24 (MAG-24) as its Aviation Combat Element (ACE), and a Brigade Service Support Group (BSSG) as it Logistics Combat Element (LCE).

NATO Symbol

1

== Organization ==
- Command Element - Battalion equivalent Headquarters & Service Company organization, formed of companies/detachments sourced from the parent MEF HQ Group and staff, and with the Deputy MEF Commander as the MEB Commander.
- Ground Combat Element (GCE)- Regimental Combat Team (RCT) consisting of a reinforced Marine Infantry Regiment.
- Aviation Combat Element (ACE)- Marine Aircraft Group (MAG), consisting of a combination of rotary-wing, tiltrotor, and/or fixed wing aircraft squadrons/detachments and aviation support squadrons/detachments, capable of conducting all six functions of Marine aviation including offensive air support, assault support, electronic warfare, control of aircraft and missiles, anti-air warfare and aerial reconnaissance.
- Logistics Combat Element (LCE)- Combat Logistics Regiment (CLR), consisting of anywhere from 1 to 3 Combat Logistics Battalions (CLB) and capable of providing full-spectrum Combat Service Support to all elements of the MEB.

== See also ==
- Marine Air-Ground Task Force
- Organization of the United States Marine Corps
