= VIPIR =

VIPIR may refer to:

- Volumetric Imaging and Processing of Integrated Radar, a software product for weather forecasting
- Visual Inspection Poseable Invertebrate Robot, a borescope camera for the International Space Station
