= Tomark Skyper GT9 =

Slovak ultralight aircraft

Skyper GT9
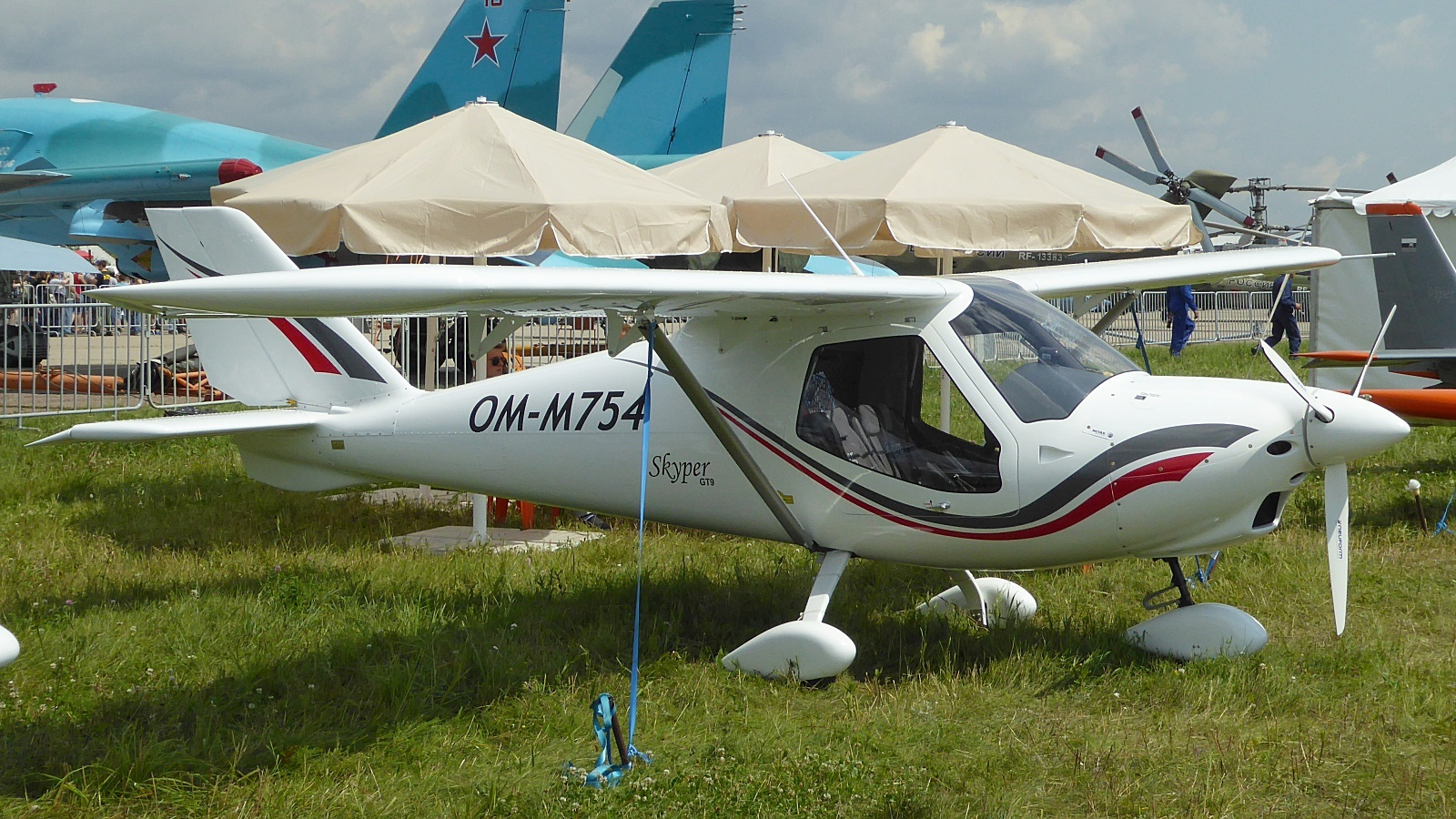

General information
- Type: Ultralight aircraft and Light-sport aircraft
- National origin: Slovakia
- Manufacturer: Tomark
- Status: In production (2017)

History
- Introduction date: 2014

The Tomark Skyper GT9 is a Slovak ultralight and light-sport aircraft, designed and produced by Tomark of Prešov, introduced in 2014. The aircraft is supplied complete and ready-to-fly.

== Design and development ==
The Skyper GT9 was designed to comply with the Fédération Aéronautique Internationale microlight rules and US light-sport aircraft rules and complies with the Czech UL2-1 and ELSA as well as German LTF-UL rules. It was designed for the flight training and touring roles. It features a strut-braced high-wing, an enclosed cabin with two-seats-in-side-by-side configuration accessed by doors, fixed tricycle landing gear and a single engine in tractor configuration.

The aircraft is made from aluminum sheet and has a round fuselage profile. Its 9.0 m (29.5 ft) span wing has an area of 10 m^{2} (110 sq ft) and mounts flaps. Standard engines available are the 100 hp (75 kW) Rotax 912ULS and 912iS four-stroke powerplants.

The design is offered in a European UL version with a 472.5 kg (1,042 lb) gross weight and a US LSA version with a gross weight of 600 kg (1,300 lb).

As of March 2017, the design does not appear on the Federal Aviation Administration's list of approved special light-sport aircraft.

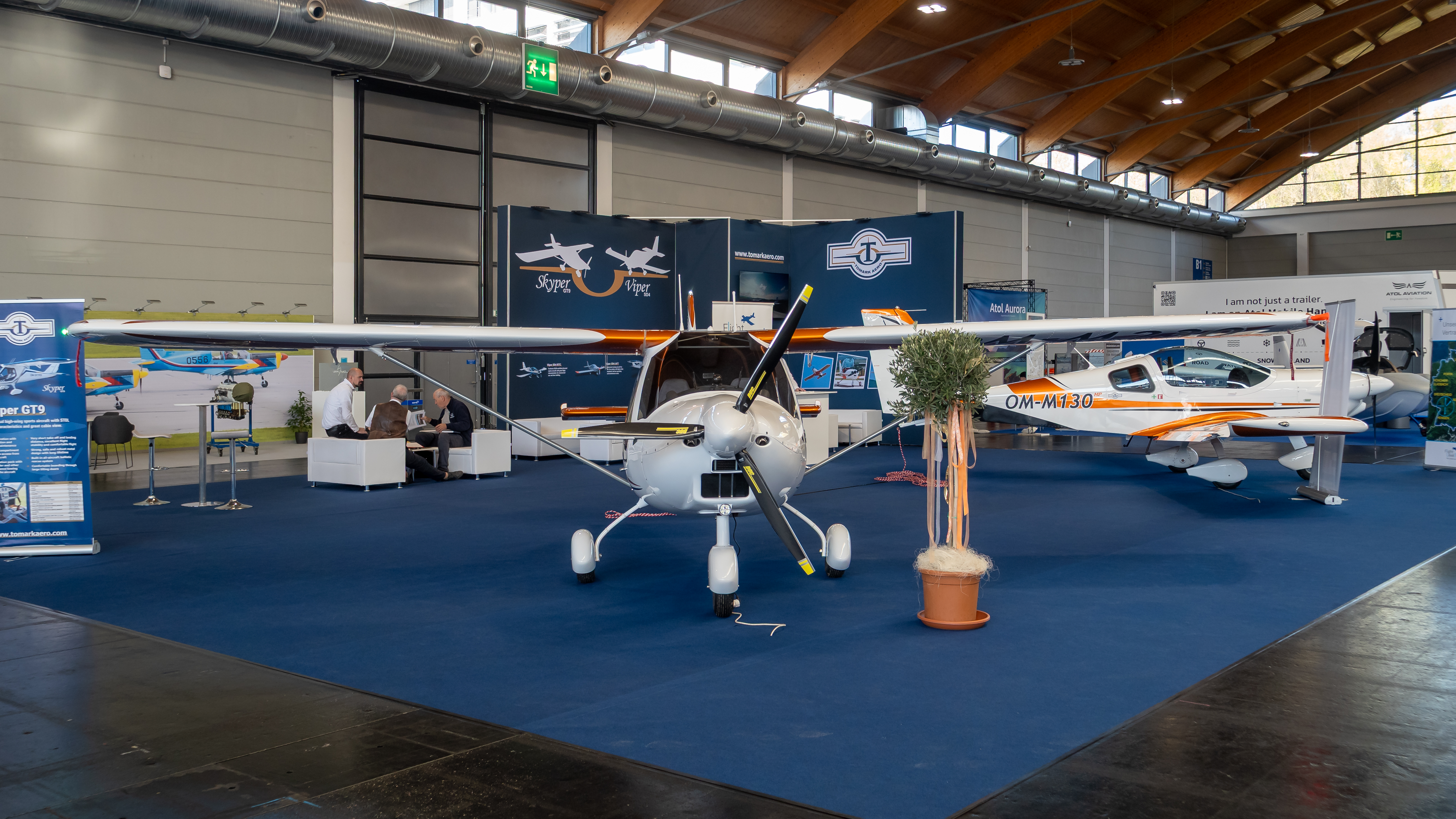
Front view

== Operational history ==
Reviewer Marino Boric described the design in a 2015 review as "ideal for cross country travel".

== Specifications (Skyper GT9 UL) ==
Data from Tacke and manufacturer

General characteristics

- Crew: one
- Capacity: one passenger
- Length: 6.3 m (20 ft 8 in)
- Wingspan: 9.0 m (29 ft 6 in)
- Height: 2.1 m (6 ft 11 in)
- Wing area: 10.0 m^{2} (108 sq ft)
- Empty weight: 315 kg (694 lb)
- Gross weight: 472.5 kg (1,042 lb)
- Fuel capacity: 92 litres (20 imp gal; 24 US gal)
- Powerplant: 1 × Rotax 912ULS four cylinder, liquid and air-cooled, four stroke aircraft engine, 75 kW (101 hp)
- Propellers: 3-bladed composite

Performance

- Maximum speed: 230 km/h (140 mph, 120 kn)
- Cruise speed: 200 km/h (120 mph, 110 kn)
- Stall speed: 61 km/h (38 mph, 33 kn) flaps down
- Never exceed speed: 250 km/h (160 mph, 130 kn)
- Service ceiling: 5,000 m (16,000 ft)
- Rate of climb: 6 m/s (1,200 ft/min)
- Wing loading: 47.3 kg/m^{2} (9.7 lb/sq ft)

== See also ==
- Tomark Viper
