= Viper Strategic Strike missile =

Viper
- Type: Cruise missile
- Place of origin: United States

Production history
- Designed: 2024-present
- Manufacturer: Mach Industries

Specifications
- Warhead: 10 kg (22 lb)+
- Operational range: 290 km (180 mi)

The Viper is a cruise missile being developed for the United States Army.

== Design ==
The Viper is designed as a vertical takeoff (VTO) surface-to-surface missile. Taking advantage of the emergence of low-cost, man-portable intelligence, surveillance and reconnaissance (ISR) assets allowing maneuver elements to see further than they were previously able to, the Viper is intended to enable tactical units to engage high-value targets, such as radar arrays and artillery pieces, well beyond the forward line of troops. The weapon will have a range of 290 km with a warhead exceeding 10 kg, providing the range of a HIMARS, the speed of a cruise missile and the lethality of a Hellfire missile. Artificial intelligence and several different radio frequencies will be used for communication, navigation and targeting in areas where GPS is severed. It is planned to cost less than $100,000 and be fielded at company- through brigade-level formations.

== History ==
In 2024, the Army Applications Laboratory awarded Mach Industries funding to develop a new cruise missile called Strategic Strike. The weapon's design was completed in September 2024, and a vertical takeoff test flight was conducted in January 2025.
