= Video Identification Parade Electronic Recording =

Digital system for conducting identity parades

Video Identification Parade Electronic Recording (VIPER) is a digital system for conducting identity parades. Rather than recruit a group of volunteers who resemble a suspect, police officers can retrieve a selection of pre-recorded video recordings of people unrelated to the case under investigation. Police officers make up a virtual parade, using clips taken from this library, and witness is then shown these, along with recordings of the current suspect. The system is used by many police forces across the UK.

VIPER was developed by West Yorkshire Police. The system is operated by the Viper Bureau from a datacentre in Wakefield. The initiative is funded by the Home Office; the initial set up cost was £7.6m, and the Wakefield datacentre was officially inaugurated by Home Secretary David Blunkett in March 2003. The system contains clips of over 50,000 different people, which can be downloaded to police laptops to allow identification to be conducted at a witness' home. A conventional lineup would cost at least £800 and could take up to ten weeks to set up – a VIPER parade costs around £150 and can be constructed in a few minutes. The system operates on a virtual private network operated by Cable and Wireless.

When the system was introduced in Scotland, Solicitor General for Scotland Elish Angiolini said "Viper is an excellent example of modernisation improving the service delivered to victims and witnesses. Old-style identification parades could be distressing for victims and witnesses and difficult to arrange quickly."
