= USS Viper =

USS Viper may refer to the following ships operated by the United States Navy:

- USS Viper (1806) was originally the cutter Ferret but was re-rigged as a brig and renamed just before the War of 1812, during which she was captured by the British.
- USS Viper (1814) was a galley hastily built and commissioned for use against the British on Lake Champlain during the War of 1812.
- USS B-1 (SS-10), a B-class submarine originally named Viper and later renamed B-1.
