= Viper-class patrol craft =

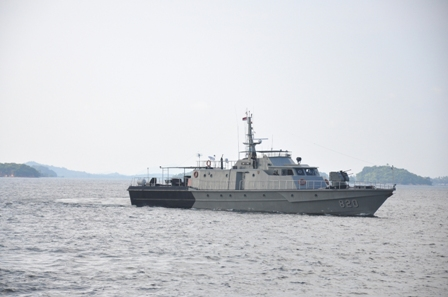

Class overview
- Completed: 6
- Active: 4
- Retired: 2

General characteristics
- Class & type: Type PC-40 patrol craft
- Tonnage: 100 tons
- Length: 40 m (131 ft 3 in)
- Beam: 7.3 m (23 ft 11 in)
- Speed: 29 knots (54 km/h; 33 mph)
- Endurance: 4 days
- Armament: 25 mm (1 in) machine guns; 12.7 mm (0.50 in) machine guns

Viper class is a Type PC-40 fiberglass patrol craft of the Indonesian Navy. It was commissioned from 20 October 2006 by Indonesian National Armed Forces Commander Marshal Djoko Suyanto.

There are a total of six craft in this class, Viper, Piton, Weling, Matacora, Tedung Selar, Boiga.As 2018 four craft remained in service while two craft were decommissioned.

== Armaments ==
The vessel is equipped with Russian-made 25 mm and 12.7 mm calibre machine guns. It also has a combat information room, a communication room and an ammunition store room.

== Notable deployments ==
KAL Viper helped recover some of the bodies from the ferry MV Levina 1.
