= 9ff GT9 =

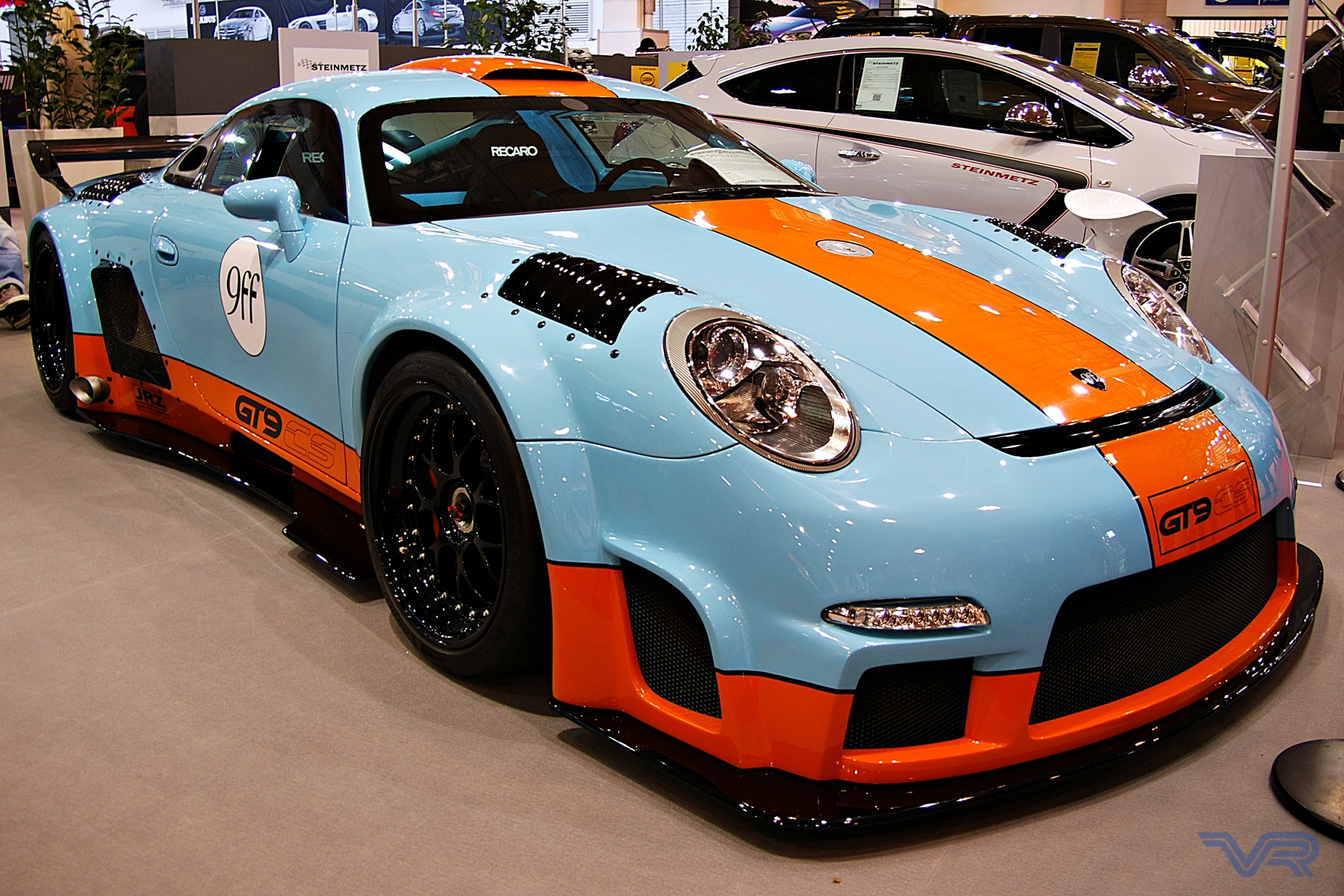
- 9ff GT9-CS at 2011 Essen Motor Show

Overview
- Manufacturer: 9ff Fahrzeugtechnik GmbH
- Production: 2007–2008 (GT9); 2008 (GT9-R); 2011 (GT9-CS)
- Assembly: Dortmund, Germany

Body and chassis
- Class: Sports car (S)
- Body style: 2-door coupé
- Layout: MR layout
- Platform: Porsche 997 GT3
- Related: Porsche 997; Ruf CTR3

Powertrain
- Engine: 4.0L twin-turbocharged H6 (GT9); 4.0L twin-turbocharged H6 (GT9-R); 3.6L twin-turbocharged H6 (GT9-CS); 4.2L twin-turbocharged H6 (GT9 Vmax)
- Power output: 987 bhp (736 kW; 1,001 PS) (GT9); 1,120 bhp (835 kW; 1,136 PS) (GT9-R); 738 bhp (550 kW; 748 PS) (GT9-CS); 1,381 bhp (1,030 kW; 1,400 PS) (GT9 Vmax)
- Transmission: 6-speed manual 6-speed sequential manual 5-speed tiptronic

Dimensions
- Wheelbase: 2,650 mm (104.3 in)
- Length: 4,733 mm (186.3 in)
- Width: 1,860 mm (73.2 in)
- Height: 1,180 mm (46.5 in)
- Kerb weight: 1,326 kg (2,923 lb) (GT9/GT9-R); 1,240 kg (2,734 lb) (GT9-CS); 1,340 kg (2,954 lb) (GT9 Vmax)

The 9ff GT9, first built in 2007 by German tuning company 9ff of Jan Fatthauer, is a 900+hp sports car based on parts of the modern rear-engined Porsche 911 generation Porsche 997, converted to the concept of its endurance racing variant of the 1990s, the Porsche 911 GT1. While the 1998 Evo version of the GT1 won the 1998 24 Hours of Le Mans, the 9ff GT9 was made to beat the 408.47 km/h (253.81 mph) Bugatti Veyron’s top speed record of the time.

Based on the Porsche 911 (997) GT3, the GT9s are extensively rebuilt and fitted with a heavily modified 3.6-4.0 litre versions of the Porsche flat-six engine version that produces about twice the power, 738 to 1,120 bhp (550 to 835 kW; 748 to 1,136 PS), depending on the configuration. For better weight distribution and top speed, lower drag and more space for drive train components, the GT9 wheel base is longer, converted to mid-engined, and with a longer tail end.

It takes the 9ff 3.8 seconds (from a rolling start) or 4.2 seconds (from a standing start) to reach 60 mph (97 km/h), and 17.6 seconds to reach 190 mph (310 km/h). The top speed of the original GT9 is 409 km/h (254 mph). This was faster than the original Bugatti Veyron, but slower than both the SSC Ultimate Aero TT and the Bugatti Veyron Super Sport.

The interior of the car has been stripped out for lightness and thus was very basic compared to a standard 911 GT3. All GT9s had blue leather, square-patterned interior trim, with a roll cage for safety. A carbon fibre and Kevlar construction helps further in weight savings.

9ff stated that only 150 GT9s would be produced, and only 20 of those would have the most powerful engine. Prices ranged between £150,000 and £540,000 depending on engine and options, with all of them already sold by the time the car was launched in the market.

== 9ff GT9-R ==
The GT9-R was a high performance variant of the GT9, offering up to 1,120 bhp (840 kW; 1,140 PS) from a 4.0L twin-turbocharged flat-6 engine. It was designed to take the speed record for a street legal car from the Bugatti Veyron, with a claimed speed of 420 km/h (260 mph), although this was never tested.

It can accelerate from 0–100 km/h (62 mph) in 2.9 seconds and 0–300 km/h (190 mph) in under 16 seconds. Only 20 examples of the GT9-R were produced.

== 9ff GT9-CS ==
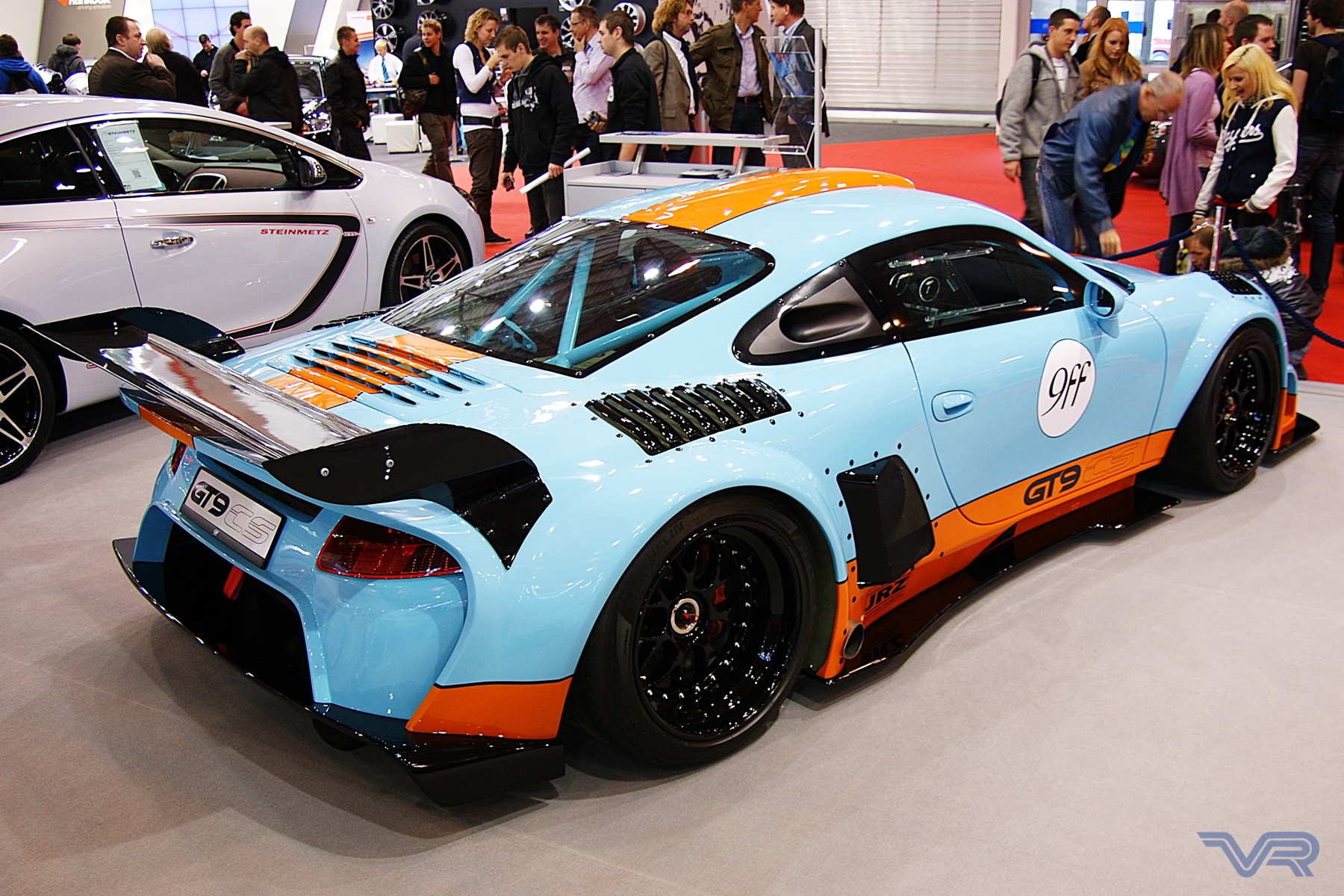
2011 9ff GT9-CS

At the 2011 Essen Motor Show, 9ff brought out the third version of the car, the GT9-CS, built as a one-off. This car used the Stage 1 3.6L twin-turbocharged flat-6 engine, thus producing 738 bhp (550 kW; 748 PS), and was designed specifically as a track-day car. A further 86 kg (190 lb) of weight was removed from the car, and several changes were made - a new rear wing, front splitter, and revised air intakes.

== 9ff GT9 Vmax ==
At the 2012 Essen Motor Show, 9ff revealed their new Vmax variant of the GT9 which produced 1,381 hp (1,030 kW; 1,400 PS) and 855 lb-ft (1,160 Nm) of torque from a 4.2-liter twin-turbocharged flat-six. This variant of the GT9 weighed 1,340 kg (2,950 lb) and was said to reach a top speed of 437 km/h (272 mph). At the time of release, this variant cost €895,000.
