= Tomark Viper SD4 =

Slovakian ultralight aeroplane

Viper SD4
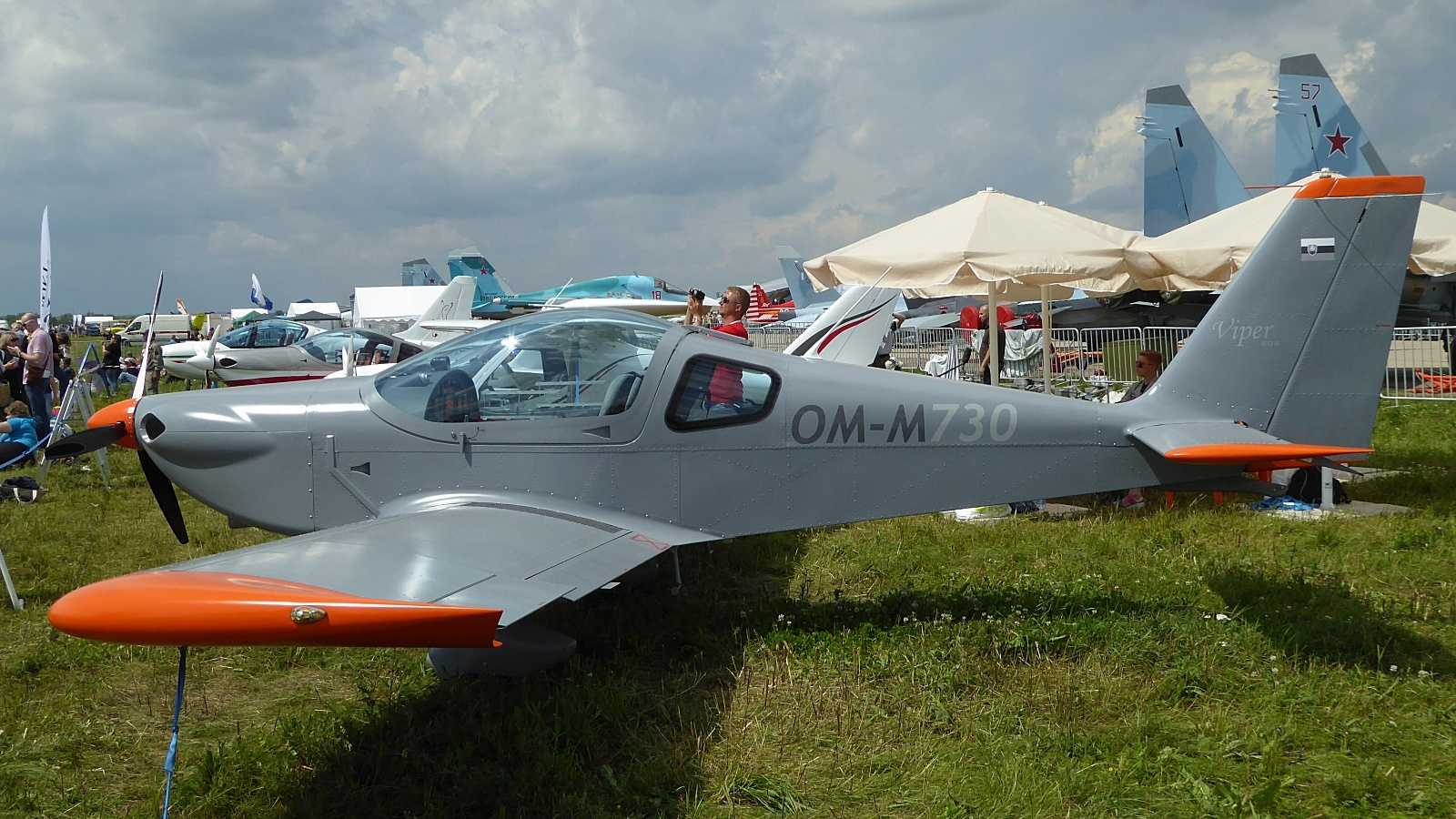

General information
- Type: Two seat ultralight
- National origin: Slovakia
- Manufacturer: Tomark s.r.o.
- Number built: 110 by July 2016

History
- Introduction date: 2007
- First flight: 1 November 2006

The Tomark Viper SD4 is a Slovak single–engine, all-metal, two-seat low wing monoplane with a fixed tricycle undercarriage and side-by-side seating for two people. The aircraft is built by Tomark s.r.o. of Prešov.

== Design and development ==
Design work on the Viper began in 2004, with the first flight on 1 November 2006 and market introduction in 2008. It is intended for touring, training and glider towing.

The Viper is constructed mostly of metal, with aluminium skinning, using CNC machining. Composite materials are used for the tips of the flying surfaces, the fuselage upper decking, engine cowling and wheel fairings. The wings have constant chord and curved, slightly upswept tips; they are built around one main and one auxiliary spar. The short span ailerons move on piano-type hinges, with slotted flaps on the rest of the trailing edges. The low-mounted horizontal tail is also of constant chord apart from a cut-out for rudder movement; the starboard elevator carries a flight adjustable trim tab. Fin and rudder are straight-edged, but swept.

The standard Viper is powered by a 60 kW (81 hp) Rotax 912UL flat four engine but the more powerful 75 kW (100 hp) Rotax 912ULS is an option. The forward fuselage is a monocoque, the rear a tube structure with an aluminium skin. The cockpit seats two in side-by-side configuration under a framed single piece canopy, with further transparencies in the fuselage immediately aft. The main undercarriage legs are cantilever springs. The mainwheels are faired and fitted with hydraulic brakes; the nosewheel is also faired and may, as an option, be steerable. Other options include instrumentation, ballistic parachute and towing gear.

The aircraft received its EASA SD4 RTC restricted type certificate in March 2016. In the US it is an accepted light-sport aircraft.

== Operational history ==
The first two production aircraft appeared at AERO Friedrichshafen in April 2007. AERO 2009 saw the first example of the Ultralight version and the announcement of the LSA variant It was originally aimed at French flying clubs but is now being marketed in the USA following certification in October 2010. US production at Winnsboro, Texas is under consideration.

By mid-2010 there were two Vipers registered in France and ten in Slovakia. By November 2010, 26 had been built.

== Variants ==
UL
Ultralight aircraft version with maximum gross weight of 472.5 kg (1,042 lb) with a ballistic parachute, for the European market.
LSA
Light-sport aircraft version with maximum gross weight of 600 kg (1,323 lb) with a ballistic parachute, for the US market.

== Specifications (UL version) ==
Data from Jane's All the World's Aircraft 2011/12

General characteristics

- Capacity: 2
- Length: 6.40 m (21 ft 0 in)
- Wingspan: 8.40 m (27 ft 7 in)
- Height: 2.20 m (7 ft 3 in)
- Empty weight: 292 kg (644 lb)
- Gross weight: 472.5 kg (1,042 lb)
- Fuel capacity: 70 L (18.5 US gal, 15.4 Imp gal)
- Powerplant: 1 × Rotax 912UL , 59.6 kW (79.9 hp)
- Propellers: 3-bladed Peszke Aero Technologies constant speed propeller

Performance

- Cruise speed: 200 km/h (120 mph, 110 kn)
- Stall speed: 65 km/h (40 mph, 35 kn) flaps down
- Range: 750 km (470 mi, 400 nmi)
- Rate of climb: 6.00 m/s (1,181 ft/min) maximum at sea level

Avionics

- Analog EFIS

== See also ==
- Tomark Skyper
