= Ovation Viper =

- Manufacturer: Ovation
- Period: 1977-early 1980s

Construction
- Body type: Solid
- Scale: 25.5"

Woods
- Body: Maple

Hardware
- Pickup(s): 2 Single-coil

The Ovation Viper is an electric guitar made by Ovation Guitar Company from 1977 to the early 1980s; it was available with two single-coil pickups (1271), and Viper III, with a third middle pickup (1273).

For a time, Ovation reused the Viper name for an acoustic electric guitar, the Yngwie J. Malmsteen Signature Viper, available in two models - YM68 (steel string) and YM63 (nylon string), introduced in 2012.

In late 2015, the reinvigorated Ovation announced a new incarnation for the Viper brand with a couple of Signature Series electric guitars, a Kevin Cronin model, another for Dave Amato (both of REO Speedwagon).
