= Valley Vipers =

Valley Vipers may refer to:

Science:

- Montivipera latifii, a venomous viper species endemic in Iran

Sports:

- Rio Grande Valley Vipers, a team in the NBA Development League
- Chattahoochee Valley Vipers, a former team in the American Indoor Football Association
- Roanoke Valley Vipers, a former team in the Southern Professional Hockey League
- Tennessee Valley Vipers, a professional arena football team in the now-defunct AF2 development league
- Valley Vipers, a minor league team based in Scottsdale, Arizona, that played in the Western Baseball League in 2000
