= HMLA-169 =

Marine Light Attack Helicopter Squadron 169
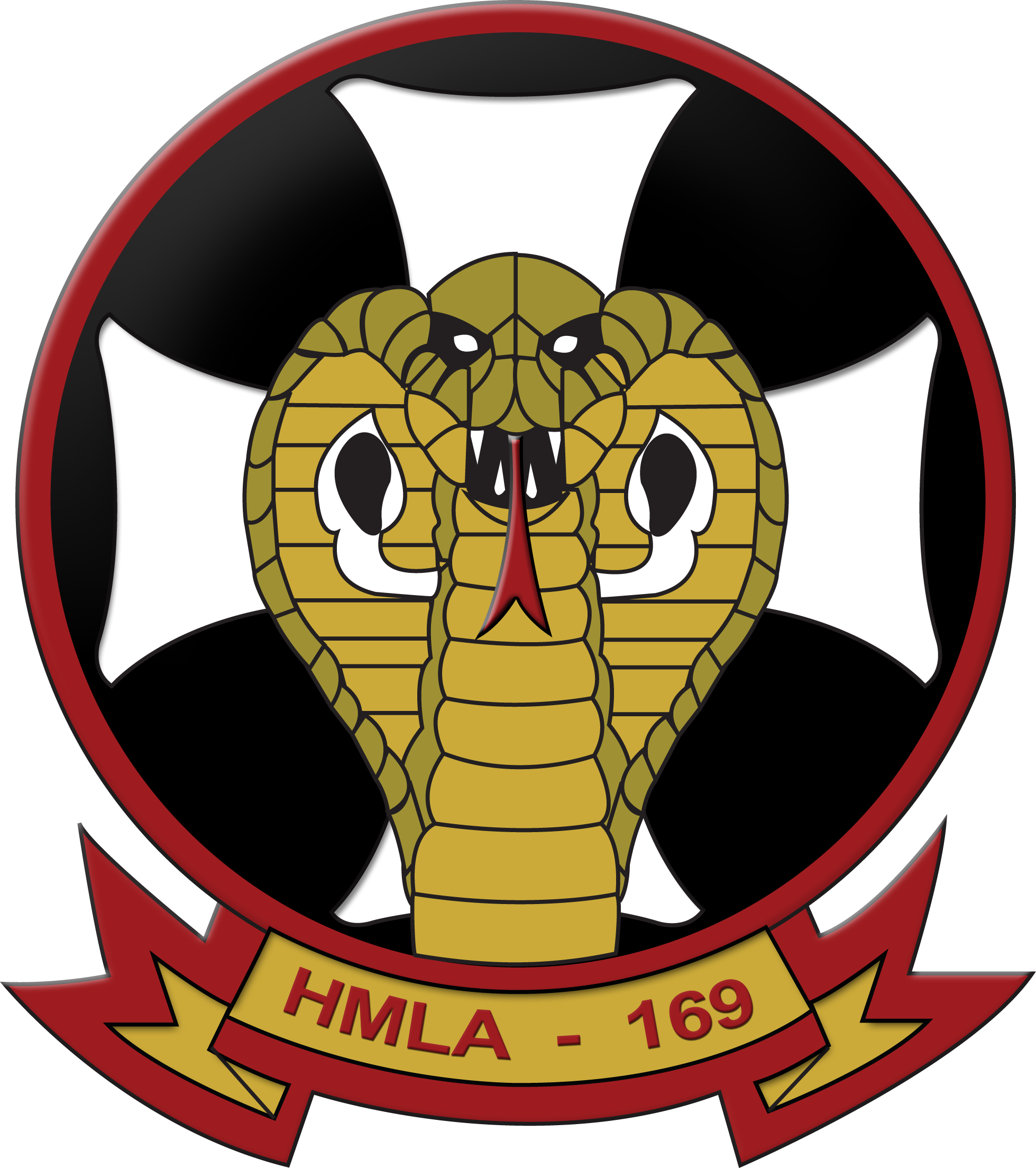
- Marine Light Attack Helicopter Squadron 169 insignia
- Active: 30 September 1971 - present
- Country: United States
- Allegiance: United States of America
- Branch: United States Marine Corps
- Type: Light/Attack squadron
- Role: Close air support; Utility air support
- Part of: Marine Aircraft Group 39; 3rd Marine Aircraft Wing
- Garrison/HQ: Marine Corps Air Station Camp Pendleton
- Nickname: "Vipers"
- Mottos: "On time. On target. Professional throughout." "We hate each other, but we hate you more.” “Hate or die."
- Tail Code: SN
- Mascot: Bak-Bak
- Engagements: Operation Desert Storm; Operation Restore Hope; Operation Iraqi Freedom * 2003 invasion of Iraq * Battle of Najaf * Operation Phantom Fury; Operation Enduring Freedom

Commanders
- Current commander: LtCol Andrew “HeadsUp” Lundskow

Marine Light Attack Helicopter Squadron 169 (HMLA-169) is a United States Marine Corps helicopter squadron consisting of AH-1Z Viper attack helicopters and UH-1Y Venom utility helicopters. The squadron is based at Marine Corps Air Station Camp Pendleton, California and falls under the command of Marine Aircraft Group 39 (MAG-39) and the 3rd Marine Aircraft Wing (3rd MAW).

== Mission ==
Support the Marine Air-Ground Task Force commander by providing offensive air support, utility support, armed escort and airborne supporting arms coordination, day or night under all weather conditions during expeditionary, joint, or combined operations.

== History ==
=== 1970s and 1980s ===
Marine Light Attack Helicopter Squadron 169 was activated as Marine Attack Helicopter Squadron 169 (HMA-169) at Marine Corps Base Camp Pendleton, California, on 30 September 1971. Unlike its sister squadrons, HMA-269 and HMA-369, HMA-169 was initially equipped with AH-1G Cobras. During 1974-75 the squadron transitioned to the more capable AH-1J Sea Cobra. The AH-1Gs were transferred out by July 1976.

Through the 1970s, HMA-169 engaged in rigorous amphibious training at sea and combined exercises ashore. The 1980s brought increased operational commitments and a growing legacy of aviation safety milestones.

On 1 October 1986, the re-designated HMLA-169 had all 24 of their advanced AH-1T (TOW) cobras phased out which were replaced with 12 of the new AH-1W (Super Cobra). These were complemented with 12 UH-1N Hueys, increasing the Vipers' capabilities commensurate with the needs of the Marine Air Ground Task Force. This made HMLA-169 the first operational Marine Corps squadron to deploy the new Super Cobra both at home and overseas on deployment.

=== Gulf War and the 1990s ===
From December 1990 to June 1991, HMLA-169 embarked aboard the USS Tarawa in support of combat operations in Southwest Asia, and deployed ashore during Operations Desert Shield and Desert Storm with MAG-50 at Tanajib, Saudi Arabia. From 24 February – 4 March 1991, the Vipers flew 234 combat sorties engaging enemy Iraqi forces without loss of aircraft or personnel.

Returning from the Kuwaiti theater, the squadron was routed to assist in humanitarian relief to flood-ravaged Bangladesh as part of Operation Sea Angel. Shortly after that the squadron participated in the humanitarian assistance mission Operation Fiery Vigil, after Mount Pinatubo erupted 15 June 1991. In May 1992, HMLA-169 supported local law enforcement during the Los Angeles riots, and again in 1993 conducted humanitarian relief and peace-keeping operations in Somalia during Operation Restore Hope.

=== Global war on terror ===
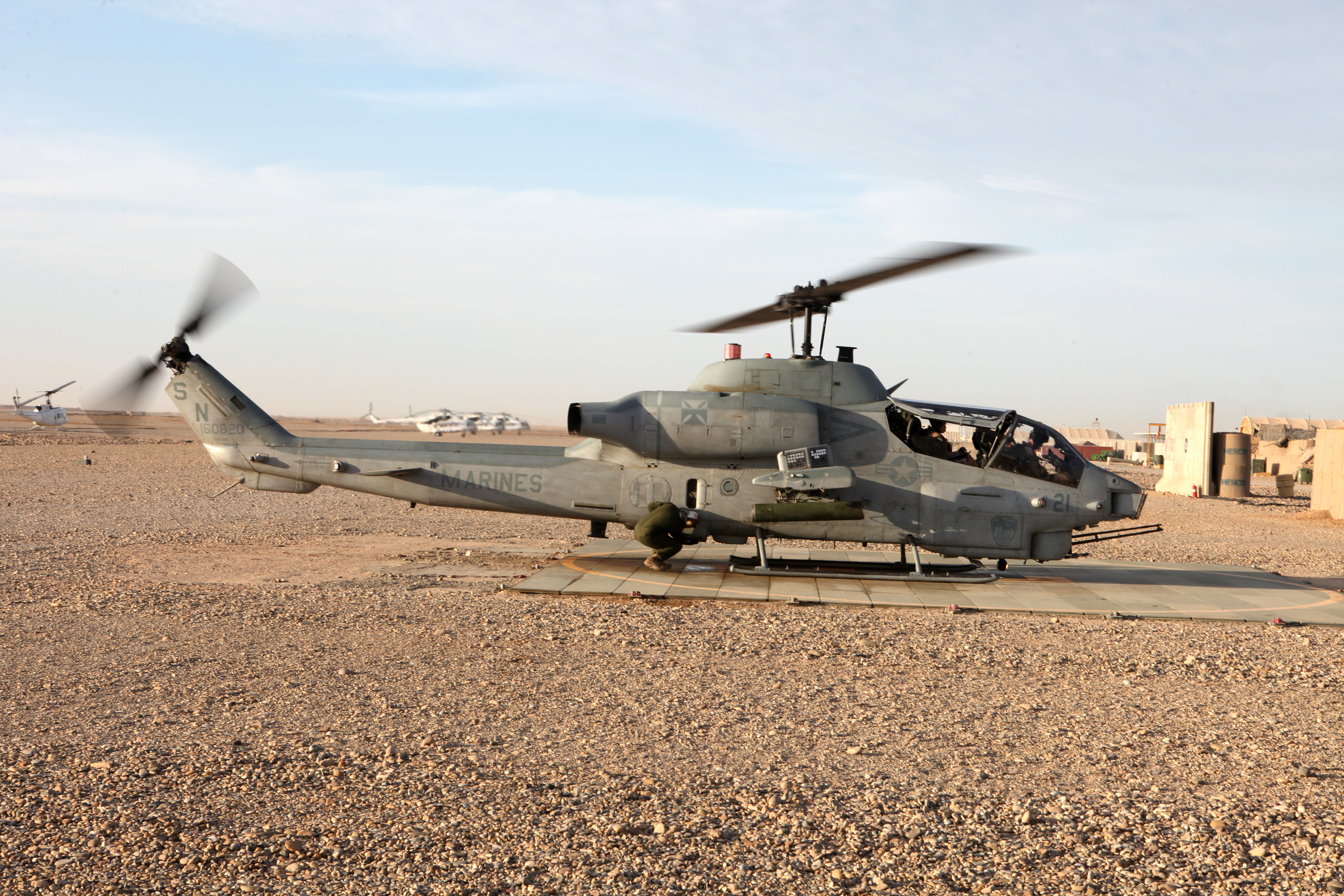
HMLA-169 AH-1W SuperCobra at Camp Dwyer, Afghanistan

HMLA-169 sourced a detachment of 4 Cobras and 3 Venoms to the 15th Marine Expeditionary Unit (15th MEU), which were among the first Marines into Afghanistan after the September 11 attacks in 2001. The squadron deployed to Iraq in late February 2003 in support of Operation Iraqi Freedom (OIF). During the 2003 invasion of Iraq 12 of the 18 AH-1Ws of the unit sustained battle damage and on 30 March 2003 a UH-1N Huey crashed; killing three members on board. HMLA-169 deployed again in the summer of 2004 to support the second iteration of OIF. During this deployment, they provided close air support during the Battle of Najaf and Operation Phantom Fury in Fallujah. The squadron is configured with 18 AH-1W SuperCobras and 9 UH-1Y SuperVenoms. HMLA-169 again deployed to Iraq in March 2006 to provide close air support for the 1st Marine Division in Al Anbar province. The unit deployed to Al Anbar again in October 2007

The squadron was deployed to Afghanistan in the spring of 2009 as part of the 2nd Marine Expeditionary Brigade. They were part of the 17,000 troop increase announced by President Obama in February, 2009.

In 2014 the squadron was awarded the John P. Giguere award for Marine Light Attack Helicopter Squadron of the Year as well as the Pete Ross award for aviation safety.

== Unit awards ==
A unit citation or commendation is an award bestowed upon an organization for the action cited. Members of the unit who participated in said actions are allowed to wear on their uniforms the awarded unit citation. HMLA-169 has been presented with the following awards:

| Streamer | Award | Year(s) | Additional Info |
|---|---|---|---|
| A streamer with red, gold, and blue horizontal stripes with a bronze star in the center | Presidential Unit Citation Streamer with one Bronze Star | 2003, 2009 | Iraq, Afghanistan |
| | Joint Meritorious Unit Award Streamer | 1991 | Bangladesh |
| A green streamer with red, gold, and blue horizontal stripes along the top and bottom with one silver star in the center | Navy Unit Commendation Streamer with one Silver Star and one Bronze Star | 1991, 1993, 2001, 2004-5, 2006-7, 2007-8, 2010–11 | Southwest Asia, Iraq, Afghanistan |
| A green streamer with red, gold, and blue horizontal stripes and four stars in the center | Meritorious Unit Commendation Streamer with four Bronze Stars | 1986-87, 1987–88, 1989–90, 1996–97, 2000–02 | |
| | National Defense Service Streamer with two Bronze Stars | 1951–1954, 1961–1974, 1990–1995, 2001–present | Vietnam War, Gulf War, war on terrorism |
| | Armed Forces Expeditionary Medal | | |
| | Southwest Asia Service Streamer with three Bronze Stars | | |
| | Afghanistan Campaign Streamer with three bronze stars | | |
| | Iraq Campaign Streamer with four bronze stars | | |
| | Global War on Terrorism Expeditionary Streamer | 2001–present | |
| | Global War on Terrorism Service Streamer | 2001–present | |

== See also ==
- United States Marine Corps Aviation
- Organization of the United States Marine Corps
- List of United States Marine Corps aircraft squadrons
