= Karsten Heckl =

U.S. Marine Corps general (born 1964)

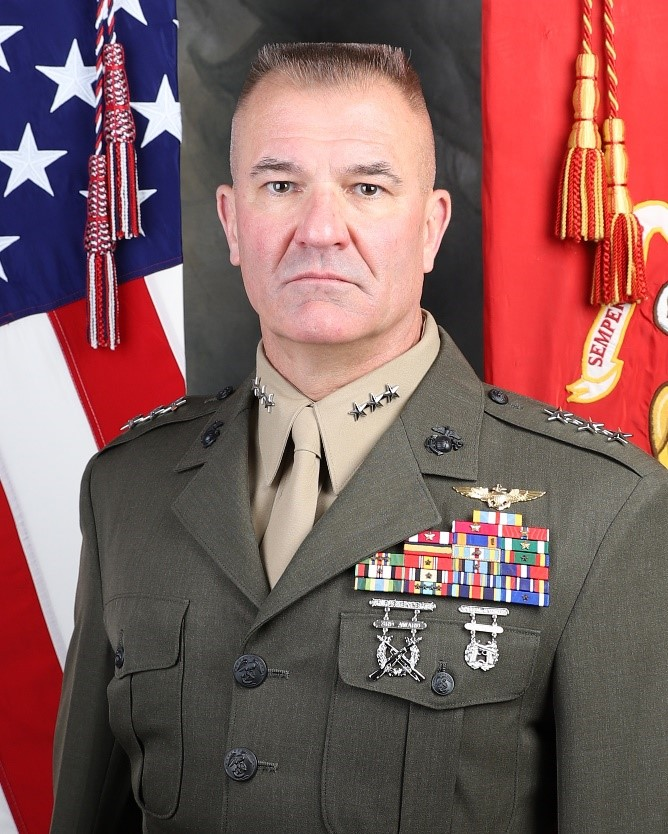
- Born: Karsten Selby Heckl; Stone Mountain, Georgia, U.S.
- Alma mater: Georgia State University (BA)
- Military career
- Allegiance: United States
- Branch: United States Marine Corps
- Service years: 1988–2024
- Rank: Lieutenant General
- Nickname: Hazel
- Commands: Marine Corps Combat Development Command; I Marine Expeditionary Force; 2nd Marine Aircraft Wing; MAWTS-1; VMM-162
- Conflicts: War in Afghanistan; Iraq War
- Awards: Defense Superior Service Medal; Legion of Merit (2); Bronze Star Medal (2)
- Karsten Heckl's voice Heckl on the 31-amphibious-ship requirement at a House Armed Services Seapower and Projection Forces Subcommittee hearing Recorded May 18, 2022

Karsten Selby Heckl (born September 2, 1964) is a retired United States Marine Corps lieutenant general who last served as the deputy commandant for combat development and integration and commanding general of the Marine Corps Combat Development Command, from 2021 to 2024. Heckl previously served as the commander of I Marine Expeditionary Force. He previously served as commander of the 2nd Marine Aircraft Wing.

On 30 October 2023, Heckl was performing the duties of commandant of the Marine Corps when Commandant Eric Smith was hospitalized, until he was relieved of those duties when General Christopher J. Mahoney was sworn in as the assistant commandant of the Marine Corps on 3 November 2023.

== Biography ==
A native of Stone Mountain, Georgia, Lieutenant General Heckl graduated from Georgia State University and was commissioned in April 1988. He was designated an unrestricted Naval Aviator in September 1990. He is also a distinguished graduate of the Amphibious Warfare School (AWS) and the Naval War College.

As a CH-46E pilot, Lieutenant General Heckl deployed with Marine Medium Helicopter Squadron (HMM) 365 and HMM-263, and served as a CH-46E Instructor and Division Head at MAWTS-1, MCAS Yuma, Arizona. Additionally, he was assigned as one of the initial cadre of pilots with Marine Medium Tiltrotor Training Squadron 204 (VMMT-204).

Staff assignments include CH-46E and MV-22 Requirements Officer, Headquarters Marine Corps (HQMC) Aviation Department, Washington DC; J3 Director of Operations, United States Forces - Afghanistan (USFOR-A), Kabul, Afghanistan; Senior Military Assistant and Marine Aide to the Secretary of the Navy; Assistant Deputy Commandant for Aviation, HQMC Aviation Department, Washington DC; Chief of Staff, Naval Striking and Support Forces NATO (STRIKFORNATO), Lisbon, Portugal.

Lieutenant General Heckl commanded Marine Medium Tiltrotor Squadron 162, which included a combat tour in Iraq in 2008 and Marine Aviation Weapons and Tactics Squadron One (MAWTS-1) in 2010. From June 2018 to July 2020 he served as the Commanding General, 2nd Marine Aircraft Wing, and subsequently assumed command of I Marine Expeditionary Force through September 2021. In August 2021 he was nominated for promotion to lieutenant general and appointment as Deputy Commandant for Combat Development and Integration of the Marine Corps, and Commanding General, Marine Corps Combat Development Command. He took office in October 2021.

While serving as Deputy Commandant for Combat Development and Integration, he was performing the duties of commandant of the Marine Corps from 30 October 2023 to 3 November 2023, when the commandant, General Eric Smith experienced a heart attack, pending the confirmation of General Christopher Mahoney as assistant commandant of the Marine Corps. The confirmation was delayed due to a hold on all military nominations by Senator Tommy Tuberville, and Heckl was the senior officer at the time. Mahoney was sworn in as assistant commandant on 3 November 2023 and assumed the duties of commandant from Heckl.

Heckl also had a leading role in implementing Force Design 2030, which was still in an early stage when he took office in 2021, throughout the Marine Corps, for which he worked with industry and the Department of the Navy. On 9 August 2024 he relinquished command of the Marine Corps Combat Development Command and the office of deputy commandant for combat development and integration to Lieutenant General Eric E. Austin, after which he retired from the military.

== Awards and decorations ==

Badge	Naval Aviator Badge			
1st row	Defense Superior Service Medal			
2nd row	Legion of Merit with one gold award star	Bronze Star with one gold award star	Meritorious Service Medal w/ 1 award star	Air Medal w/ flight numeral 1
3rd row	Navy and Marine Corps Commendation Medal w/ 1 award star	Presidential Unit Citation	Joint Meritorious Unit Award with one bronze oak leaf cluster	Navy Unit Commendation with one bronze service star
4th row	Navy Meritorious Unit Commendation w/ 3 service stars	National Defense Service Medal w/ 1 service star	Armed Forces Expeditionary Medal w/ 1 service star	Kosovo Campaign Medal
5th row	Afghanistan Campaign Medal w/ 1 service star	Iraq Campaign Medal w/ 1 service star	Global War on Terrorism Expeditionary Medal	Global War on Terrorism Service Medal
6th row	Armed Forces Service Medal	Navy Sea Service Deployment Ribbon w/ 8 service stars	Navy & Marine Corps Overseas Service Ribbon	NATO Medal for Yugoslavia w/ 1 service star
Badge	Rifle Expert Badge		Pistol Expert Badge	

Military offices
Preceded by Matthew G. Glavy	Commander of the 2nd Marine Aircraft Wing; 2018–2020	Succeeded by Michael S. Cederholm
Preceded by Joseph Osterman	Commander of the I Marine Expeditionary Force; 2020–2021	Succeeded by George W. Smith Jr.
Preceded by Eric Smith	Deputy Commandant for Combat Development and Integration of the United States Marine Corps and Commanding General of the Marine Corps Combat Development Command; 2021–2024	Succeeded by Eric E. Austin
