= Military Secretary to the Commandant of the Marine Corps =

Senior advisor and task manager for the Commandant of the Marine Corps

The military secretary to the commandant of the Marine Corps is the senior advisor and task manager for the commandant of the Marine Corps. Personally selected by the commandant, the military secretary is an active duty colonel who reports directly to the commandant. The exact duties of the military secretary have varied based on the needs and preferences of each commandant. There are no existing manuals or orders that dictate the exact role of the military secretary. They run the day-to-day operations of the office of the commandant, supervise the schedule of the commandant, and perform other duties as the commandant may direct. In order to perform the multi-faceted duties of the military secretary, the marine must be well versed in all aspects of the United States Marine Corps, the United States Department of Defense, and the United States Government.

Comparable positions in other branches of the military are:

- U.S. Air Force – senior military assistant
- U.S. Army – executive officer to the secretary of the army
- U.S. Navy – military assistant

== Responsibilities ==
The military secretary serves as a direct advisor to the commandant of the Marine Corps. The military secretary is primarily responsible for filtering and directing the flow of information to the commandant, keeping the commandant abreast of situations impacting the Marine Corps, gathering and analyzing pertinent information in order to provide sound guidance and counsel to the commandant. Their responsibilities extend to acting as a liaison between the commandant and the secretary of the General Staff, participating in scheduling and coordination with the assistant commandant, and supervising the commandant's personal staff. Foreign dignitaries often visit the commandant who in turn travels overseas to visit them. Not only does the military secretary oversee the preparation and execution of these trips, they may be required to accompany the commandant on these trips or engage guests on the commandant's behalf and they only follow orders from the commandant.

== History ==
Originally, the position of military secretary to the commandant of the Marine Corps (or MilSec) was called the secretary to the major general commandant (MGC). The position was created by the 17th commandant of the Marine Corps, Major General Thomas Holcomb, who appointed Colonel Alexander A. Vandegrift as the first military secretary in 1936.

Until the 1950s, the assistant commandant worked in the same office as the commandant. At this time the assistant commandant moved to his own office space and created a more defined position. Prior to this move, the military secretary performed duties for the assistant commandant as well.

== List of military secretaries ==
Fifty-three marines have served as the military secretary to the commandant of the Marine Corps. Two marines have served as the military secretary and have later gone on to become the commandant:

- General Alexander A. Vandegrift
- General James L. Jones, Jr.

The current military secretary is Colonel Robert Weiler.

#	Photo	Name	Rank	Start of tenure	End of tenure	Retired rank	Commandant served under	References
1		Alexander A. Vandegrift	Colonel	1937	1940	General	Major General Thomas Holcomb	
2		William C. James	Colonel	1940	1942	Brigadier General	Lieutenant General Thomas Holcomb	
3		Harry Schmidt	Brigadier General	1942	1942	General	Lieutenant General Thomas Holcomb	
4		Frederick C. McConnell	Colonel	1942	1944	Colonel	Lieutenant General Thomas Holcomb	
5		Joseph C. Burger	Colonel	1944	1946	Lieutenant General	General Alexander A. Vandegrift	
6		Donald C. Curtis	Colonel	1946	1948	Brigadier General	General Alexander A. Vandegrift until 1947 General Clifton B. Cates until 1948	
7		Edwin A. Pollock	Colonel	1948	1949	General	General Clifton B. Cates	
8		Joseph H. Berry	Colonel	1949	1951	Brigadier General	General Clifton B. Cates	
9		Victor H. Krulak	Colonel	1952	1956	Lieutenant General	General Lemuel C. Shepherd, Jr.	
10		Ormond R. Simpson	Colonel	1956	June 1958	Lieutenant General	General Randolph M. Pate	
11		Roy L. Kline	Brigadier General	June 1958	January 1960	Brigadier General	General Randolph M. Pate	
12		John P. Coursey	Brigadier General	January 1960	October 1962	Brigadier General	General David M. Shoup	
13		Oscar T. Jensen, Jr.	Colonel	1963	1963		General David M. Shoup	
14		James O. Appleyard	Colonel	1964	1966		General Wallace M. Greene, Jr.	
15		Foster LaHue	Brigadier General	1965	1967	Lieutenant General	General Wallace M. Greene, Jr.	
16		Carl W. Hoffman	Colonel	1967	1967	Major General	General Wallace M. Greene, Jr.	
17		Fred E. Haynes Jr.	Colonel	1968	1968	Major General	General Leonard F. Chapman, Jr.	
18		Emmett O. Anglin, Jr.	Colonel	1968	1971		General Leonard F. Chapman, Jr.	
19		Andrew E. O'Donnell	Colonel	1969	1971		General Leonard F. Chapman, Jr.	
20		George R. Brier	Colonel	1971	1972		General Leonard F. Chapman, Jr. and General Robert E. Cushman, Jr.	
21		Robert E. Howard, Jr.	Colonel	1972	1974		General Robert E. Cushman, Jr.	
22		Ross L. Mulford	Colonel	1974	1976		General Robert E. Cushman, Jr. until 1975 and General Louis H. Wilson, Jr. until 1976	
23		Robert C. Hagerty	Colonel	1976	1978		General Louis H. Wilson, Jr.	
24		John B. Donovan, Jr.	Colonel	1978	1979		General Louis H. Wilson, Jr.	
25		Darell U. Davidson	Colonel	1979	1980	Colonel	General Robert H. Barrow	
26		Walter R. Ledbetter, Jr.	Colonel	1980	1981		General Robert H. Barrow	
27		James H. R. Curd	Colonel	1981	1983		General Robert H. Barrow	
28		Joseph H. Alexander	Colonel	1983	1985		General Paul X. Kelley	
29		Edward M. Mockler	Colonel	1985	1986		General Paul X. Kelley	
30		Terry J. Ebbert	Colonel	1986	1987		General Paul X. Kelley	
31		Harvey C. Barnum, Jr.	Colonel	1987	1989	Colonel	General Alfred M. Gray, Jr.	
32		James L. Jones, Jr.	Colonel	1989	1990	General	General Alfred M. Gray, Jr.	
33		Richard A. Combs	Colonel	1990	1991		General Alfred M. Gray, Jr.	
34		Peter T. Metzger	Colonel	1991	1992		General Carl E. Mundy, Jr.	
35		James C. Flynn	Colonel	1992	1995		General Carl E. Mundy, Jr.	
36		Russell E. Appleton	Colonel	1995	1998		General Charles C. Krulak	
37		John R. Allen	Colonel	1998	1999	General	General Charles C. Krulak	
38		Dennis J. Hejlik	Colonel	1999	2001	Lieutenant General	General James L. Jones, Jr.	
39		George J. Flynn	Colonel	2001	2002	Lieutenant General	General James L. Jones, Jr.	
40		Robert E. Schmidle Jr.	Colonel	2002	2003	Lieutenant General	General James L. Jones, Jr. until 2003 and General Michael W. Hagee until 2003	
41		James C. Walker	Colonel	2003	2006	Brigadier General	General Michael W. Hagee	
42		Kenneth F. McKenzie Jr.	Brigadier General	2006	2007	General	General Michael W. Hagee and until 2006 and General James T. Conway until 2007	
43	Photo of Colonel Milburn	George F. Milburn	Colonel	2007	2010	Colonel	General James T. Conway	
44	Photo of Brigadier General Smith Jr.	George W. Smith Jr.	Brigadier General	2010	2011	Lieutenant General	General James F. Amos	
45		James W. Bierman Jr.	Colonel	2011	2013	Lieutenant General	General James F. Amos	
46		Roger B. Turner Jr.	Colonel	2013	2014	Lieutenant General	General James F. Amos	
47		Michael Cederholm	Colonel	2014	2015	Lieutenant General	General Joseph Dunford	
48		Scott F. Benedict	Colonel	2015	July 2016	Major General	General Robert Neller	
49		Eric E. Austin	Colonel	July 2016	June 2017	Major General	General Robert Neller	
50		Thomas J. Gordon	Colonel	June 2017	August 2019	Colonel	General Robert Neller	
51		Scott Leonard	Colonel	August 2019	June 2021	Colonel	General David H. Berger	
52		Adolfo Garcia Jr.	Colonel	June 2021	July 2022	Brigadier General	General David H. Berger	
53		Robert S. Weiler	Colonel	June 2022	2023	Brigadier General	General David H. Berger	
54		Michael R. Nakonieczny	Colonel	2023		Colonel	General Eric Smith	

== See also ==
- Commandant of the Marine Corps
- Assistant Commandant of the Marine Corps
- Sergeant Major of the Marine Corps
