= Bradford Gering =

U.S. Marine Corps general

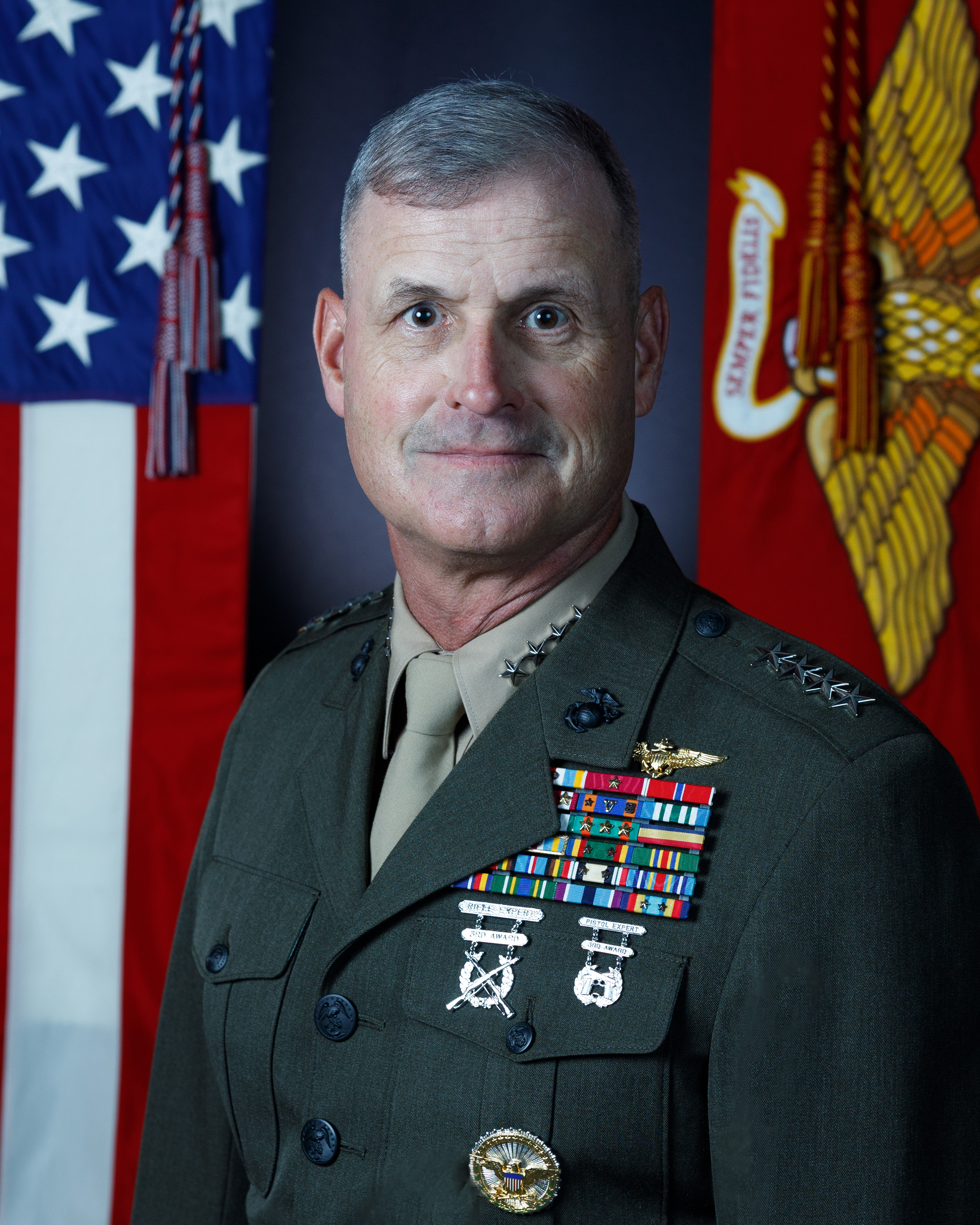
- Official portrait, 2025
- Education: Binghamton University (BA); National Defense University (MS)
- Military career
- Allegiance: United States
- Branch: United States Marine Corps
- Service years: 1989–present
- Rank: General
- Commands: Assistant Commandant of the Marine Corps; Marine Corps Aviation; I Marine Expeditionary Force (acting); 3rd Marine Aircraft Wing; MAWTS-1; VMA-211
- Conflicts: Iraq War

Bradford J. Gering is a United States Marine Corps General who has served as the Assistant Commandant of the Marine Corps since October 1, 2025. He most recently served as the acting commanding general of I Marine Expeditionary Force from August 2023 to February 2024. He previously served as commanding general of the 3rd Marine Aircraft Wing from July 2021 to June 2023. He also served as Deputy Director of Operations of the United States Africa Command. Previously, he was the Deputy Commander of the United States Marine Corps Forces Command. In 1989, Gering was commissioned as a second lieutenant. From 2012 to 2014, he was the commanding officer of Marine Aviation Weapons and Tactics Squadron One (MAWTS-1) at MCAS Yuma in Arizona.

In March 2024, Gering was nominated for promotion to lieutenant general and assignment as deputy commandant for aviation.

In September 2025, Gering was nominated for appointment to the grade of General for assignment to duty as the Assistant Commandant of the Marine Corps.

== Awards and decorations ==
Gerings' decorations and medals include:

Naval Aviator Badge
Bronze Star Medal	Defense Superior Service Medal with one bronze oak leaf cluster	Legion of Merit with one award star	Meritorious Service Medal with three award stars
Air Medal with bronze star,"V" device andStrike/Flight numeral 8	Joint Service Commendation Medal	Navy Commendation Medal with award star	Navy Achievement Medal with three award stars
Joint Meritorious Unit Award	Navy Unit Commendation with two bronze service stars	Navy Meritorious Unit Commendation	National Defense Service Medal with one service star
Armed Forces Expeditionary Medal	United States Navy Presidential Unit Citation ribbon	Iraq Campaign Medal with two service stars	Global War on Terrorism Service Medal
Korea Defense Service Medal	Sea Service Deployment Ribbon with six service stars	Global War on Terrorism Expeditionary Medal	Humanitarian Service Medal
Rifle Expert Badge		Pistol Expert Badge	
Office of the Secretary of Defense Identification Badge

Military offices
Preceded by Robert Neller	Commander of the United States Marine Corps Forces Command; 2015	Succeeded by John Wissler
Preceded by Gregg A. Sturdevant	Deputy Commander of the United States Marine Corps Forces Command; 2015–2017	Succeeded by Eric E. Austin
Preceded by Christopher J. Mahoney	Commanding General of the 3rd Marine Aircraft Wing; 2021–2023	Succeeded by Michael J. Borgschulte
Preceded by George W. Smith Jr.	Commanding General of I Marine Expeditionary Force; Acting; 2023–2024	Succeeded by Michael S. Cederholm
Preceded by Michael S. Cederholm	Deputy Commandant for Aviation of the United States Marine Corps; 2024–2025	Succeeded by William H. Swan
Preceded by Christopher J. Mahoney	Assistant Commandant of the Marine Corps; 2025–president	Incumbent
