= William R. Etnyre =

United States Marine Corps general

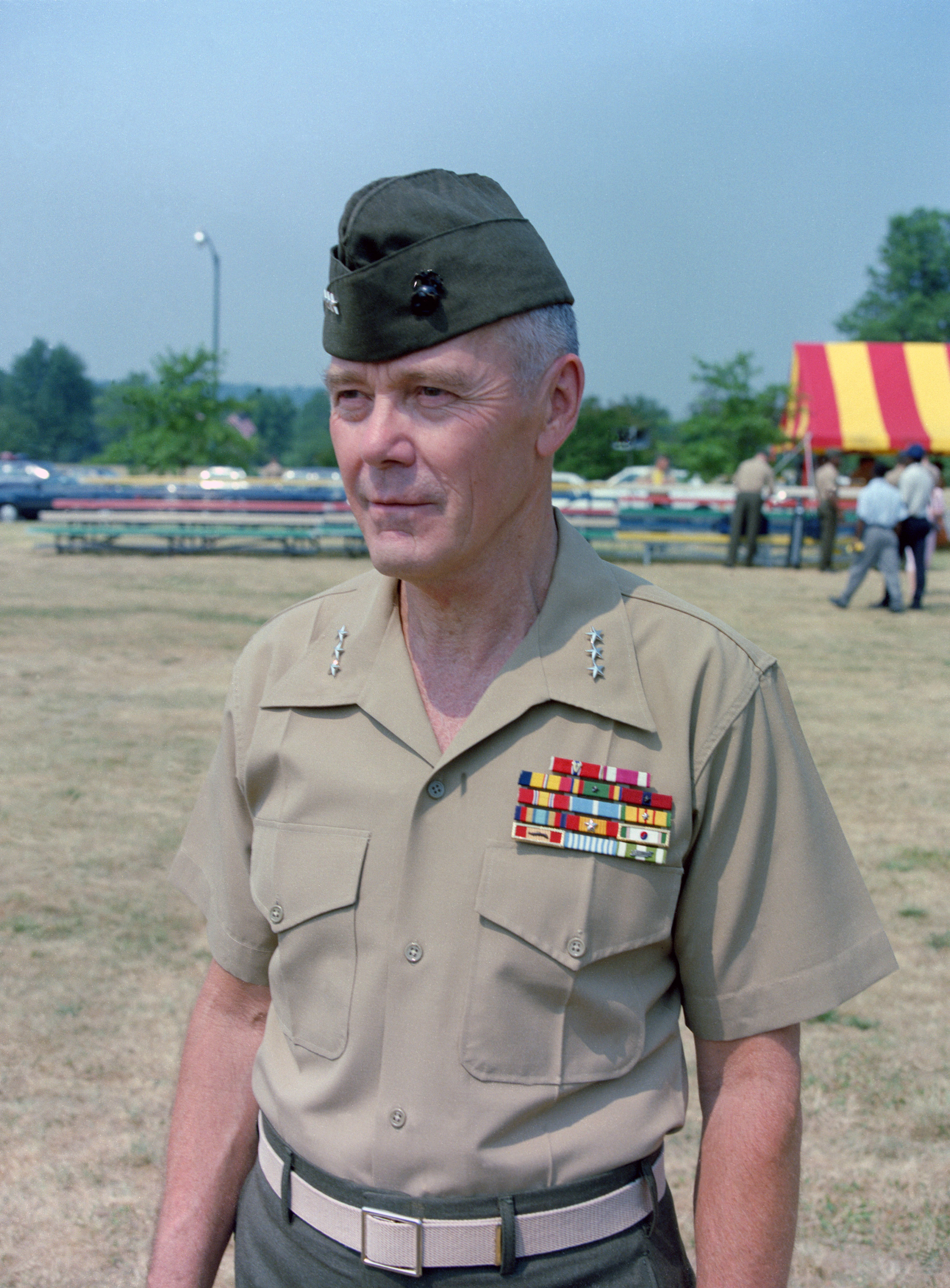
- Etnyre in 1988
- Born: March 5, 1931 (age 95); Kansas City, Missouri, U.S.
- Military career
- Allegiance: United States
- Branch: United States Marine Corps
- Rank: Lieutenant general

William R. Etnyre (born March 5, 1931) is a retired lieutenant general in the United States Marine Corps. He is a former Commanding General of the Marine Corps Combat Development Command. Entyre was a former enlisted marine before he received a commission in 1953.
