= George W. Smith Jr. =

United States Marine Corps general

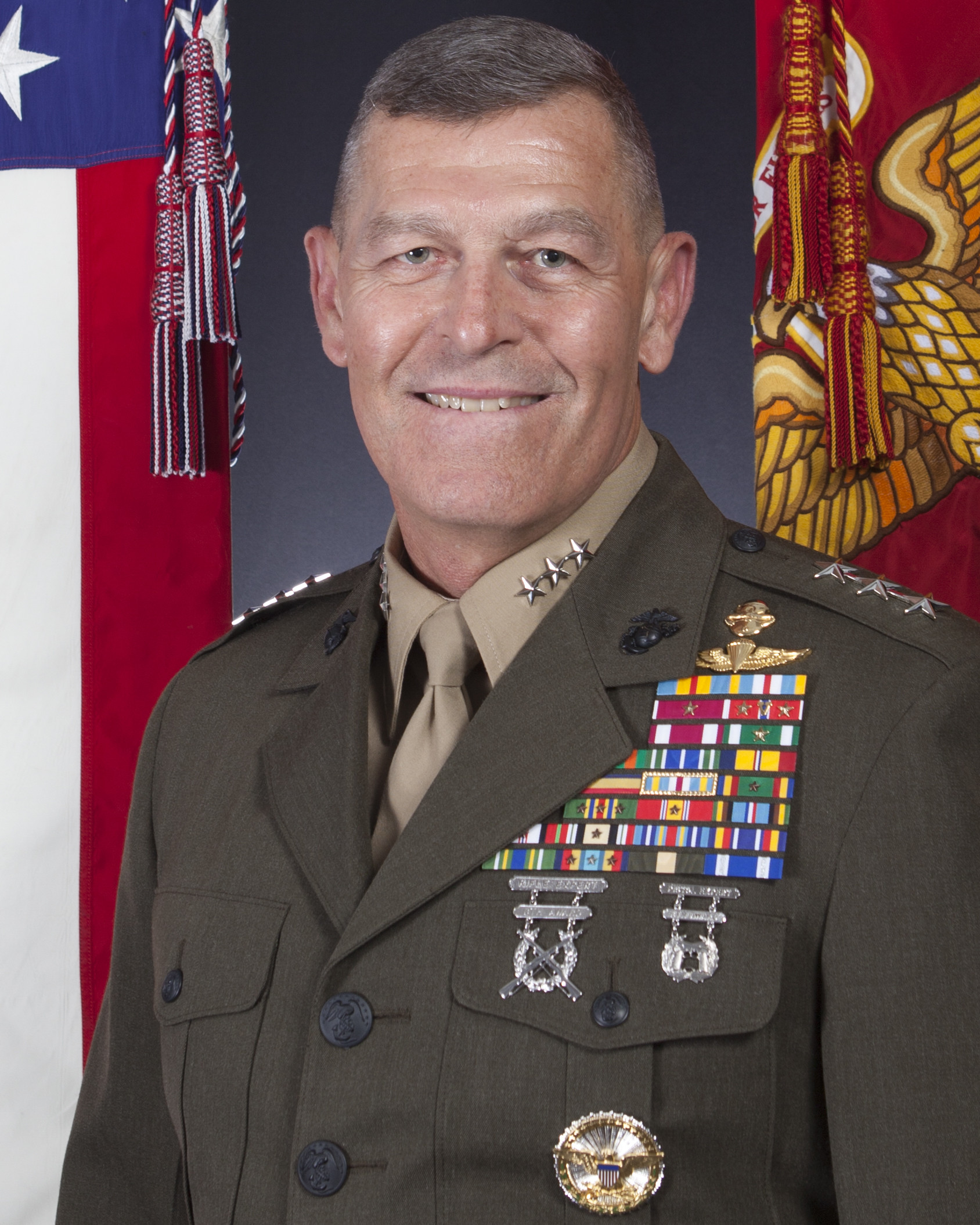
- Smith in 2019
- Relatives: George W. Smith (father)
- Military career
- Allegiance: United States
- Branch: United States Marine Corps
- Service years: 1985–2023
- Rank: Lieutenant General
- Commands: I Marine Expeditionary Force; Marine Corps Air Ground Combat Center; The Basic School; 1st Force Reconnaissance Company
- Conflicts: War in Afghanistan; Iraq War
- Awards: Defense Distinguished Service Medal; Defense Superior Service Medal; Legion of Merit (2); Bronze Star Medal (3)

George William Smith Jr. is a retired Lieutenant Generalin the United States Marine Corps who last served as commander of the I Marine Expeditionary Force from September 2021 to August 2023. He most recently served as the Deputy Commandant for Plans, Policies, and Operations until August 2021. He previously served as Senior Military Assistant to the United States Secretary of Defense, a position for which he was nominated by James Mattis in September 2018. He was commissioned in 1985 after graduating from the University of North Carolina at Chapel Hill, through a Naval ROTC program. He is the son of George W. Smith, who was a major general in the Marine Corps.

== Military career ==
Smith was commissioned in the United States Marine Corps as a second lieutenant in 1985 following graduation from the NROTC program at the University of North Carolina at Chapel Hill. Smith graduated from The Basic School and the Infantry Officers Course, then reported to 2nd Battalion, 1st Marines where he served as a rifle platoon commander and later as the 81 mm Mortar Platoon Commander. He then transferred to 1st Battalion, 3rd Marines, serving as Logistics Officer and Rifle Company Commander. He has served staff billets including Series and Company Commander, Marine Corps Recruit Depot San Diego; Inspector-Instructor, 4th Force Reconnaissance Company; Future Operations Planner, I Marine Expeditionary Force G-3 and G-5; and Deputy Operations Officer, 1st Marine Division. As a lieutenant colonel, Smith assumed command of 1st Force Reconnaissance Company, during which he deployed twice in support of Operation Iraqi Freedom. From 2007 to 2010, Smith was the Commanding Officer, The Basic School in Quantico, Virginia.

As a General Officer, Smith served as Commanding General, Marine Corps Air Ground Combat Center, Twentynine Palms, California; Deputy Commander, Regional Command Southwest in Helmand Province, Afghanistan; Deputy Commanding General, Marine Corps Combat Development Command, Quantico, Virginia; Director, Manpower Plans and Policy Division, Quantico, Virginia, Director, Strategy, Plans and Policy Directorate, United States Central Command, MacDill AFB, Florida, and most recently as the Senior Military Assistant to the Secretary of Defense. He assumed his duties as Deputy Commandant for Plans, Policies, and Operations from August 2019 to August 2021.

== Awards and decorations ==
U.S. military decorations
Navy Distinguished Service Medal
Defense Distinguished Service Medal
Defense Superior Service Medal
Legion of Merit with one gold award star
Bronze Star Medal with Combat Distinguishing Device and two gold award stars
Meritorious Service Medal
Navy and Marine Corps Commendation Medal with gold award star
Navy and Marine Corps Achievement Medal
Army Achievement Medal
Combat Action Ribbon
Navy Presidential Unit Citation
Joint Meritorious Unit Award
Navy Unit Commendation with bronze campaign stars
Navy Meritorious Unit Commendation with three bronze campaign stars
U.S. Service (Campaign) Medals and Service and Training Ribbons
National Defense Service Medal with bronze campaign stars
Armed Forces Expeditionary Medal
Afghanistan Campaign Medal with bronze campaign stars
Iraq Campaign Medal with bronze campaign stars
Global War on Terrorism Expeditionary Medal
Global War on Terrorism Service Medal
Korea Defense Service Medal
Navy Sea Service Deployment Ribbon with silver and two bronze service stars
Drill Instructor Ribbon
NATO Medal for service with ISAF

U.S. badges, patches and tabs
Marine Corps Combatant Diver Insignia
Navy and Marine Corps Parachutist Insignia
Rifle Expert Badge
Pistol Expert Badge
Office of the Secretary of Defense Identification Badge

Military offices
Preceded by George F. Milburn	Military Secretary to the Commandant of the Marine Corps; 2010–2011	Succeeded by James Bierman
Preceded by Steven W. Busby	Director of Strategy, Plans and Policy of the United States Central Command; 2014–2016	Succeeded by Michael E. Langley
Preceded by Craig S. Faller	Senior Military Assistant to the Secretary of Defense; 2018–2019	Succeeded by Bryan P. Fenton
Preceded by Brian Beaudreault	Deputy Commandant for Plans, Policies, and Operations of the United States Marine Corps; 2019–2021	Succeeded by David J. Furness
Preceded by Karsten S. Heckl	Commanding General of the I Marine Expeditionary Force; 2021–2023	Succeeded by Bradford J. Gering; Acting
