= Eric Smith (general) =

American 39th Commandant of the Marine Corps

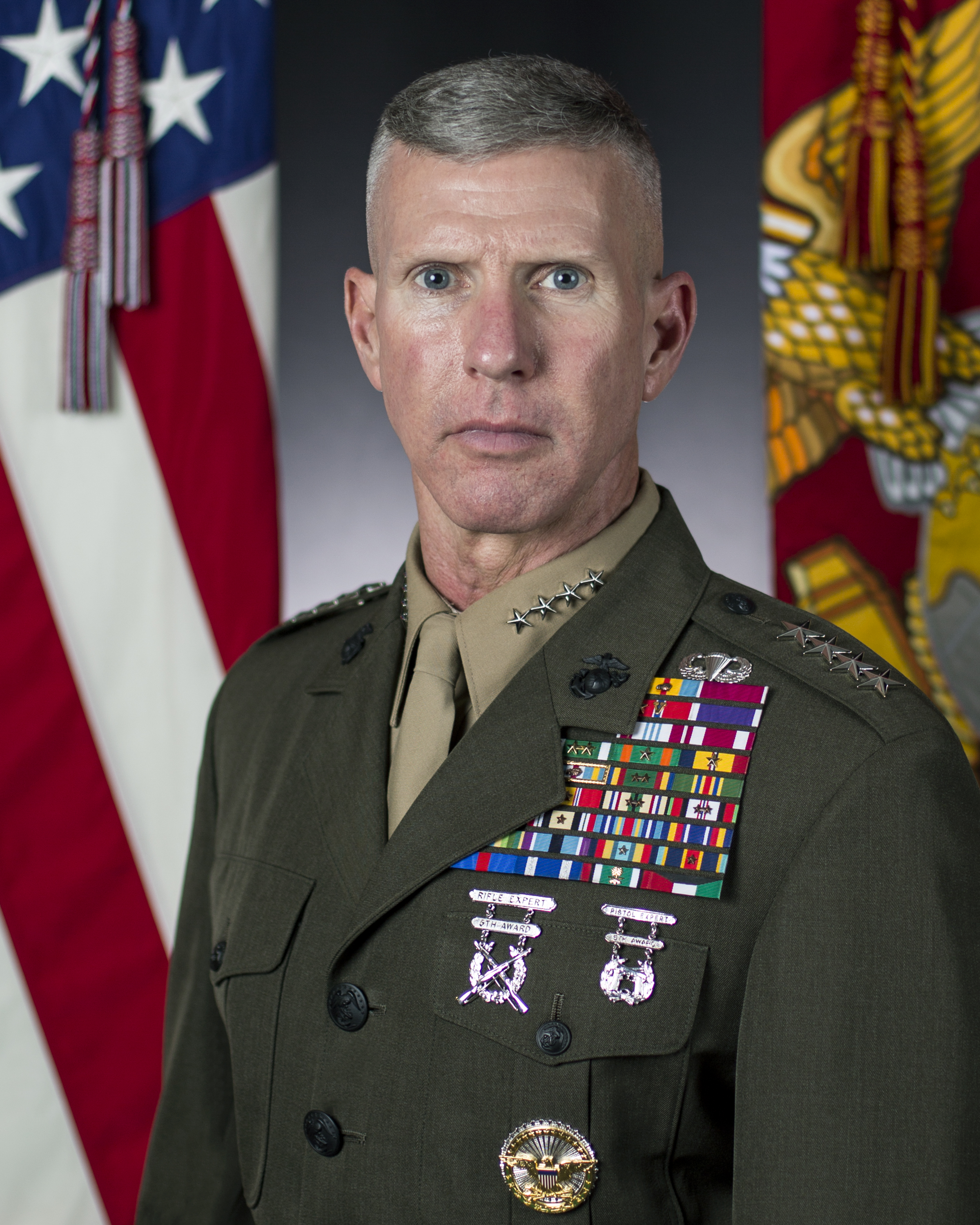
- Official portrait
- Born: December 8, 1965 (age 60); Kansas City, Missouri, U.S.
- Education: Texas A&M University (BA)
- Military career
- Allegiance: United States
- Branch: United States Marine Corps
- Service years: 1987–present
- Rank: General
- Commands: Commandant of the Marine Corps; Assistant Commandant of the Marine Corps; Marine Corps Combat Development Command; III Marine Expeditionary Force; First Marine Division; United States Marine Corps Forces, South; 8th Marine Regiment; 1st Battalion, 5th Marines
- Conflicts: Persian Gulf War; Iraq War; War in Afghanistan
- Awards: Defense Distinguished Service Medal (2); Legion of Merit; Bronze Star (2); Purple Heart
- Eric Smith's voice Smith's opening statement at his confirmation hearing to be commandant of the Marine Corps; Recorded June 13, 2023

Eric M. Smith (born December 8, 1965) is an American general who has served as the 39th Commandant of the United States Marine Corps since 2023.

Smith was born in Missouri and raised in Texas. He received his commission in the United States Marine Corps via the Naval Reserve Officers Training Corps when he graduated from Texas A&M University in 1987. Early in his career, he was deployed during the Gulf War and during Operation Assured Response in Liberia. He was the Naval Section Chief of the U.S. Military Group in Venezuela from 2001 to 2003. Smith was deployed for the Iraq War multiple times, and for the war in Afghanistan.

He commanded United States Marine Corps Forces South from 2015 to 2016. Smith was then the senior military assistant to the U.S. secretary of defense under Ash Carter and Jim Mattis. After that, he commanded the 1st Marine Division from 2017 to 2018, and the III Marine Expeditionary Force from 2018 to 2019. He then served as the commander of the Marine Corps Combat Development Command before he became the 36th Assistant Commandant of the Marine Corps in 2021.

As the Commandant of the Marine Corps, he continued implementation of Force Design, which started under his predecessor.

== Early life and education ==
Eric Smith was born on December 8, 1965, in Kansas City, Missouri. He was raised in Plano, Texas. Smith was commissioned as a second lieutenant in the United States Marine Corps in 1987 through the Naval Reserve Officers Training Corps program at Texas A&M University. During his time at A&M, he was a member of the Ross Volunteers and Commander of the Fightin' Texas Aggie Band in the Texas A&M University Corps of Cadets.

== Military career ==
After completing The Basic School and Infantry Officer's Course, he received assignment to 2nd Battalion, 3rd Marines as rifle platoon commander participating in Operation Desert Shield/Desert Storm. Following a tour as an Officer Selection Officer, he attended the Amphibious Warfare School and then reported to 2nd Battalion, 2nd Marines for duty as Commanding Officer of Weapons and E Companies. During this tour he participated in Operation Assured Response in Monrovia, Liberia. After a tour as a Marine Officer Instructor at Texas A&M University, he attended the United States Army Command and General Staff College. The following assignment was as the Naval Section Chief at the U.S. Military Group in Caracas, Venezuela from 2001 to 2003. He was a foreign area officer and can speak Spanish.

From 2003 until 2006, Smith served in the 1st Marine Division as the Division Operations Officer; Executive Officer of Regimental Combat Team 1; Commanding Officer of 1st Battalion, 5th Marines. During this time, had several deployments to Iraq in support of Operation Iraqi Freedom, including Fallujah in 2004 and Ramadi in 2005. He has also served in the 2nd Marine Division as the Assistant Chief of Staff and the Commanding Officer of 8th Marine Regiment, which was deployed to Afghanistan and was involved in Operation Enduring Freedom. From July to November 2015, he commanded the Marine Corps Forces Southern Command in Miami, Florida. He was the first dedicated commander of Marine Forces South at its Miami headquarters. Then he was transferred to the Pentagon to serve as the Senior Military Assistant to the Secretary of Defense, Ash Carter and Jim Mattis.

As a major general, Smith assumed command of the First Marine Division at Camp Pendleton. The division is part of the larger I Marine Expeditionary Force. As commander, he led a hazing crackdown but was rebuked by a military judge.

In May 2018, Smith was nominated for promotion to lieutenant general, and assignment as commanding general of III Marine Expeditionary Force. He received his promotion and assumed command of III MEF in August 2018.

On 13 June 2019, Smith assumed responsibility as the Commanding General, Marine Corps Combat Development Command and the Deputy Commandant for Combat Development and Integration. In July 2021, he was nominated and confirmed for promotion to four-star general and assignment as Assistant Commandant of the Marine Corps, succeeding Gary L. Thomas. He assumed the position from the retiring Gary L. Thomas on 8 October 2021.

=== Commandant of the Marine Corps ===
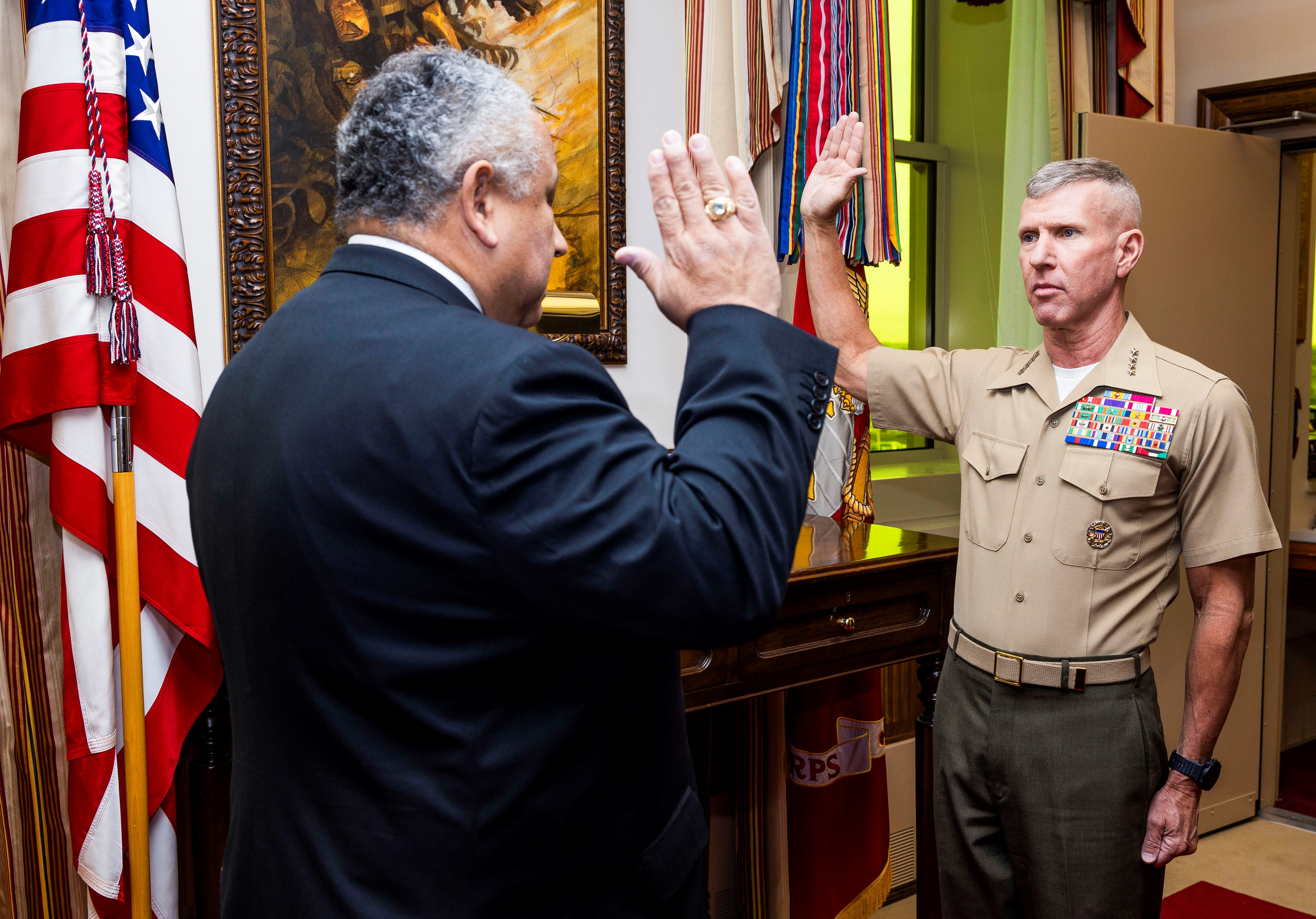
Smith is sworn in as the 39th commandant of the Marine Corps by Carlos Del Toro, secretary of the Navy, on 22 September 2023.

In May 2023, Smith was nominated to succeed General David Berger as commandant of the Marine Corps; his confirmation hearing before the Senate Armed Services Committee was held on 13 June 2023. Smith became acting Commandant upon Berger's retirement on 10 July 2023, as his confirmation was delayed by Senator Tommy Tuberville's hold on military nominees. He was confirmed by a unanimous 96-0 vote on 21 September 2023, and sworn in on 22 September. After taking office, Smith continued to perform the duties of both the Commandant and the Assistant Commandant, because the nomination of Christopher J. Mahoney for the latter role was still being delayed in the Senate.

On 29 October 2023, Smith was hospitalized after a medical emergency while jogging near his home at Marine Barracks, Washington, D.C. He was found and assisted by bystanders, who called emergency services. Smith was diagnosed with cardiac arrest. On 9 November, he issued a statement saying, "My recovery is going well, and I look forward to getting back in the fight as soon as I can". As of the time of his swearing in as Assistant Commandant, General Christopher J. Mahoney has been performing General Smith's duties as Commandant of the Marine Corps. Before Mahoney was sworn in on 3 November, Lieutenant General Karsten Heckl was performing the duties of Commandant. Smith returned to his duties as Commandant on 5 March 2024, after having recovered.

As Commandant, Smith continued implementing Force Design, the reform of the Marine Corps started by his predecessor. He did not publish an update for 2024, but he provided testimony on it to the Senate on 16 May 2024. On 23 October 2025, he published the 2025 Force Design Update and affirmed that Force Design is the "strategic priority" of the Corps. In early June 2026, Smith hosted a delegation from the Republic of Korea Marine Corps, including commandant Ju Il-seok, to discuss increasing bilateral cooperation. Later that month, Smith hosted General Gwyn Jenkins, First Sea Lord of the Royal Navy and Commandant General Royal Marines, at Marine Barracks, Washington, D.C. for the sunset parade.

== Awards and decorations ==
U.S. military decorations
Defense Distinguished Service Medal with one bronze oak leaf cluster
Legion of Merit
Bronze Star Medal with Combat Distinguishing Device and one gold award star
Purple Heart
Defense Meritorious Service Medal
Meritorious Service Medal
Navy and Marine Corps Commendation Medal with two award stars
Navy and Marine Corps Achievement Medal with award star
Combat Action Ribbon with gold award star
U.S. Unit Awards
Joint Meritorious Unit Award with oak leaf cluster
Navy Unit Commendation with two bronze service stars
Navy Meritorious Unit Commendation
U.S. Service (Campaign) Medals and Service Ribbons
National Defense Service Medal with bronze service star
Southwest Asia Service Medal with two bronze campaign stars
Afghanistan Campaign Medal with two service stars
Iraq Campaign Medal with service star
Global War on Terrorism Expeditionary Medal
Global War on Terrorism Service Medal
Armed Forces Service Medal
Humanitarian Service Medal
Sea Service Deployment Ribbon with silver service star
Navy and Marine Corps Overseas Service Ribbon with bronze service star
Marine Corps Recruiting Service Ribbon
NATO Medal for service with ISAF
Kuwait Liberation Medal (Saudi Arabia)
Kuwait Liberation Medal (Kuwait)

U.S. badges, patches and tabs
Parachutist Badge
Rifle Expert Badge (5th award)
Pistol Expert Badge (5th award)
Joint Chiefs of Staff Identification Badge
Office of the Secretary of Defense Identification Badge

== Dates of promotion ==
Rank	Branch	Date
Second lieutenant	Marine Corps	11 March 1987
First lieutenant	Marine Corps	
Captain	Marine Corps	
Major	Marine Corps	1 May 1997
Lieutenant colonel	Marine Corps	27 February 2002
Colonel	Marine Corps	13 March 2008
Brigadier general	Marine Corps	21 June 2012
Major general	Marine Corps	1 May 2017
Lieutenant general	Marine Corps	28 June 2018
General	Marine Corps	29 July 2021

Military offices
Preceded by David W. Coffman	Commander of United States Marine Corps Forces, South; 2015–2016	Succeeded by Kevin Iiams
Preceded by Ronald F. Lewis	Senior Military Assistant to the Secretary of Defense; 2016–2017	Succeeded by Craig S. Faller
Preceded by Daniel J. O'Donohue	Commanding General of the 1st Marine Division; 2017–2018	Succeeded by Robert F. Castellvi
Preceded by Lawrence D. Nicholson	Commanding General of the III Marine Expeditionary Force; 2018–2019	Succeeded by H. Stacy Clardy
Preceded by David H. Berger	Deputy Commandant for Combat Development and Integration of the United States Marine Corps; Commanding General of the Marine Corps Combat Development Command; 2019–2021	Succeeded by Karsten Heckl
Preceded by Gary L. Thomas	Assistant Commandant of the Marine Corps; 2021–2023	Succeeded by Christopher J. Mahoney
Preceded by David H. Berger	Commandant of the Marine Corps; 2023–present	Incumbent
Order of precedence
Preceded by Randy A. George as Chief of Staff of the Army	Order of precedence of the United States as Commandant of the Marine Corps	Succeeded by Daryl L. Caudle as Chief of Naval Operations
