= Christopher J. Mahoney =

U.S. Marine Corps general

Christopher Mahoney
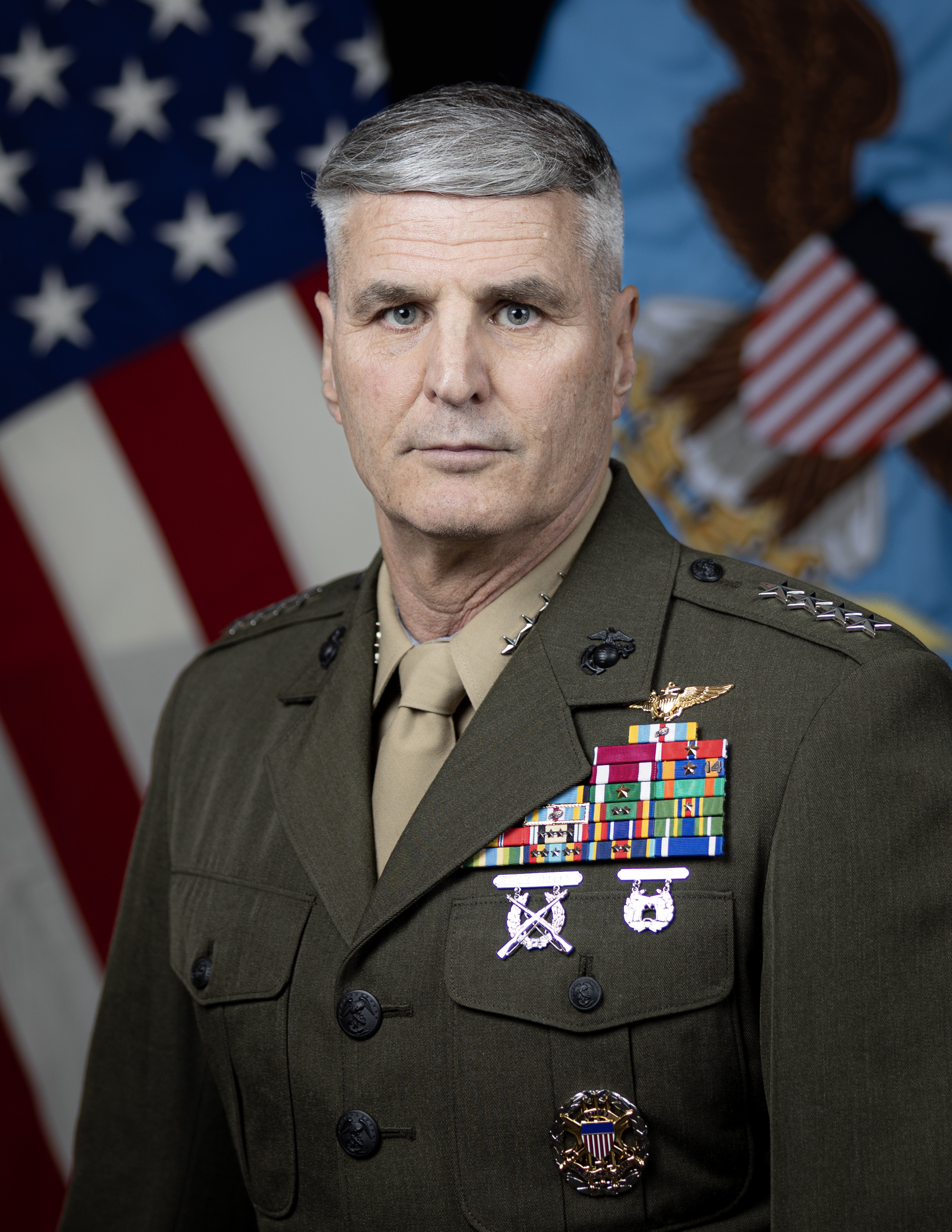
- Official portrait, 2025
- Born: Weymouth, Massachusetts, U.S.
- Education: College of the Holy Cross (BA); University of Canberra (MA); Air University (MA)
- Military career
- Allegiance: United States
- Branch: United States Marine Corps
- Service years: 1987–present
- Rank: General
- Nickname: "Moe"
- Commands: Vice Chairman of the Joint Chiefs of Staff; Assistant Commandant of the Marine Corps; 3rd Marine Aircraft Wing; Marine Aircraft Group 12; Marine Fighter Attack Squadron 242
- Conflicts: Iraq War
- Awards: Defense Superior Service Medal (2); Legion of Merit; Bronze Star Medal (2)

Christopher J. Mahoney (born c. 1965) is a United States Marine Corps general who serves as the 13th vice chairman of the Joint Chiefs of Staff. From 2023 to 2025, Mahoney was the assistant commandant of the Marine Corps. He previously served as the deputy commandant for programs and resources from 2021 to 2023.

== Early life and education ==
Mahoney was born in South Weymouth, Massachusetts, and raised in Cohasset, Massachusetts. He graduated from the College of the Holy Cross in 1987 with a Bachelor of Arts degree in economics and was commissioned through the Naval Reserve Officers Training Corps program. He completed The Basic School (TBS) and the Infantry Officer Course (IOC) at Quantico, Virginia, in 1988.

After flight training, he was designated a naval aviator in May 1990. Mahoney later earned a master's degree in management from the University of Canberra in December 2001 and a second master's degree in international strategic relations from the Air War College at Air University in May 2007. He has also graduated from the Weapons and Tactics Instructor Course (WTI), the Marine Division Tactics Course (MDTC), the United States Navy Fighter Weapons School (TOPGUN), and the Australian Command and Staff College.

== Marine Corps career ==
After flight training in Florida and Texas and his qualification as an A6-E Intruder pilot, Mahoney deployed to the Indo-Pacific with Marine All Weather Fighter Attack Squadron 224, The Bengals. He completed transition training to the F-18 at Marine Corps Air Station (MCAS) El Toro and made multiple deployments with Marine Fighter Attack Squadron 242, Squadron 122, and Squadron 242 to the Indo-Pacific, Italy, and Iraq, based out of MCAS Beaufort, South Carolina, and MCAS Miramar, California. Additionally, Mahoney served a tour as an instructor at the Marine Aviation Weapons and Tactics Squadron-1 (MAWTS-1) at MCAS Yuma, Arizona. As a pilot he has over 5,000 hours of flight time in the A-6, F-5, F-18, and the F-35, and he is also a qualified Forward Air Controller and parachutist.

He has held command at the squadron, group and wing levels. He completed a Joint Force tour as Chief of Staff of the Joint Improvised Explosive Device Defeat Organization at the National Training Center, Fort Irwin, California, and he served as the Executive Assistant to the Deputy Commandant for Programs and Resources at Headquarters, U.S. Marine Corps (HQMC).

His General Officer duties include Deputy Commander, U.S. Marine Forces Pacific; Director of Strategy and Plans at HQMC; Deputy Commander, U.S. Forces, Japan; Commanding General, 3rd Marine Aircraft Wing; and Deputy Commandant for Programs and Resources, HQMC. In the latter role, Mahoney was the fiscal director of the Marine Corps, and defended Force Design 2030.

In July 2023, Mahoney was nominated for promotion to general and appointment as assistant commandant of the Marine Corps. His confirmation vote was delayed by the hold placed by Senator Tommy Tuberville on all military nominations. General Mahoney was sworn in as the 37th assistant commandant of the Marine Corps on 3 November 2023. At the same time began performing the duties of commandant of the Marine Corps, because the commandant, General Eric Smith, had been hospitalized after a heart attack. Mahoney took over that role from Lieutenant General Karsten Heckl, who had been the next highest ranking officer during the absence of an assistant commandant.

Smith returned to his full role as commandant on 5 March 2024, and after that Mahoney continued to serve as the assistant commandant. In June 2025, he was nominated to become the vice chairman of the Joint Chiefs of Staff by President Donald Trump. On 11 September 2025, the confirmation hearing of the Senate Armed Services Committee was held for Mahoney to be appointed as Joint Chiefs vice chairmen, replacing Navy Admiral Christopher Grady. He was sworn into the position as the 13th vice chairmen on 1 October 2025.

== Awards and decorations ==
U.S. military decorations
Defense Superior Service Medal with one bronze oak leaf cluster
Legion of Merit
Bronze Star Medal with and one bronze award star
Meritorious Service Medal
Air Medal with and one bronze award star and bronze Strike/Flight numeral 14
Navy and Marine Corps Achievement Medal
U.S. Unit Awards
Joint Meritorious Unit Award with oak leaf cluster
Navy Unit Commendation with two bronze service stars
Navy Meritorious Unit Commendation
U.S. Service (Campaign) Medals and Service and Training Ribbons
National Defense Service Medal with bronze service star
Iraq Campaign Medal with four service star
Global War on Terrorism Service Medal
Korea Defense Service Medal
Armed Forces Service Medal
Navy and Marine Corps Sea Service Deployment Ribbon with silver service star and four bronze service stars
Navy and Marine Corps Overseas Service Ribbon with two bronze service star
NATO Medal

U.S. badges, patches and tabs
Rifle Expert Badge (5th award)
Pistol Expert Badge (5th award)
Joint Chiefs of Staff Identification Badge

Military offices
Preceded by Kevin Iiams	Commanding General of the 3rd Marine Aircraft Wing; 2020–2021	Succeeded by Bradford Gering
Preceded by John M. Jansen	Deputy Commandant for Programs and Resources of the United States Marine Corps; 2021–2023	Succeeded by James H. Adams III
Preceded by Eric Smith	Assistant Commandant of the Marine Corps; 2023–2025	Succeeded by Bradford Gering
Preceded by Christopher W. Grady	Vice Chairman of the Joint Chiefs of Staff; 2025–present	Incumbent
Order of precedence
Preceded by Charles Q. Brown Jr. as Former Chair of the Joint Chiefs of Staff	Order of precedence of the United States as Vice Chairman of the Joint Chiefs of Staff	Succeeded by B. Chance Saltzman as Chief of Space Operations
