= David Berger (general) =

Retired American general (b. 1959)

David H. Berger
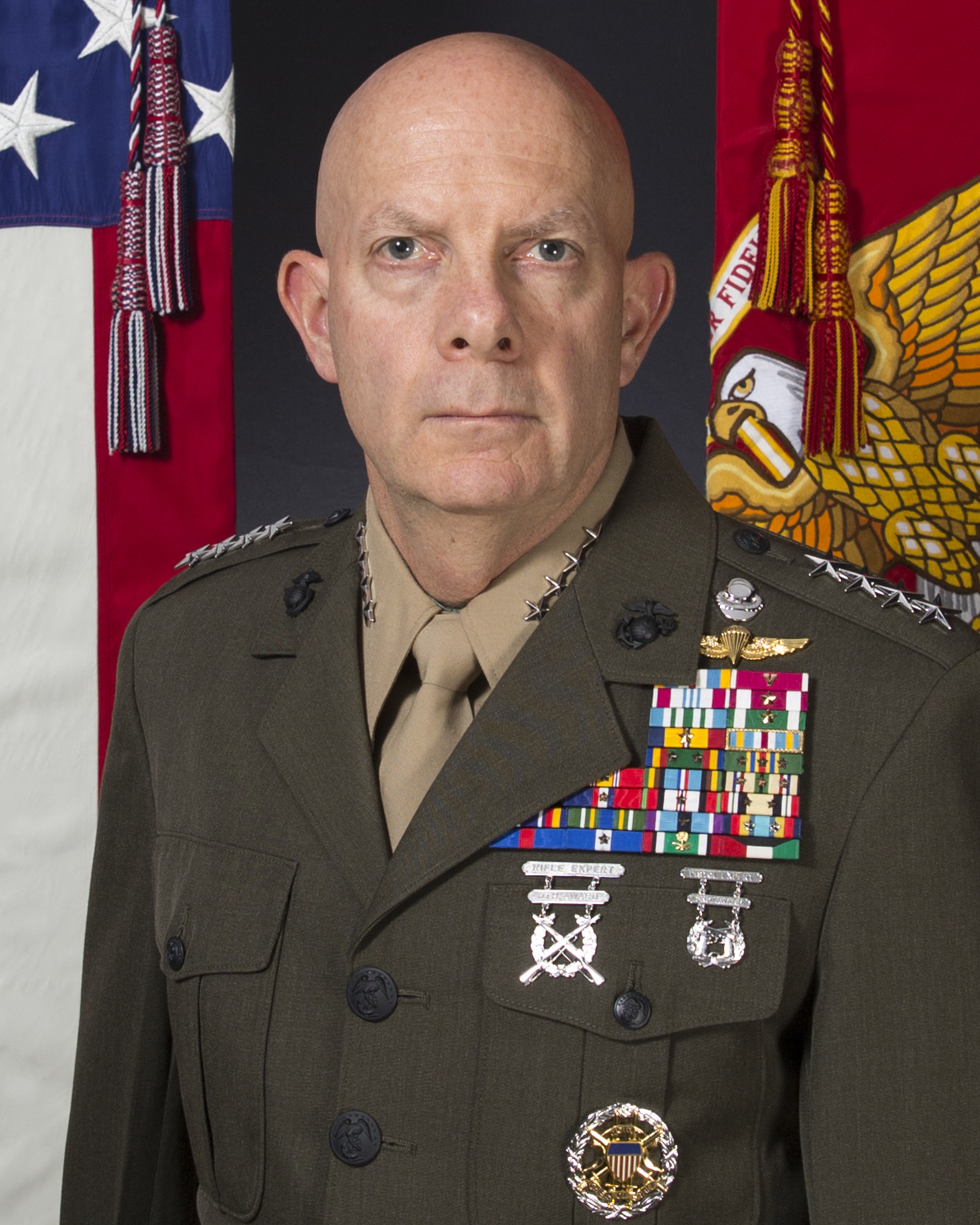
- Official portrait, 2019
- Born: December 21, 1959 (age 66); Dover, Delaware, U.S.
- Education: Tulane University (BS); Johns Hopkins University (MPP, MS)
- Military career
- Allegiance: United States
- Branch: United States Marine Corps
- Service years: 1981–2023
- Rank: General
- Commands: Commandant of the Marine Corps; Marine Corps Combat Development Command; United States Marine Corps Forces, Pacific; I Marine Expeditionary Force; Marine Air Ground Task Force Training Command; 1st Marine Division; 8th Marine Regiment; 3rd Battalion, 8th Marines
- Conflicts: Gulf War; Operation Secure Tomorrow; Iraq War; War in Afghanistan
- Awards: Navy Distinguished Service Medal; Defense Superior Service Medal; Legion of Merit with valor
- David H. Berger's voice Berger's opening statement at a Senate Appropriations Committee hearing on the FY2021 Navy and Marine Corps posture Recorded March 11, 2020

David Hilberry Berger (born December 21, 1959) is an American retired general who served as the 38th commandant of the United States Marine Corps from 2019 to 2023.

Berger was born in Delaware and raised in Maryland. He graduated from Tulane University and was commissioned as a United States Marine Corps officer in 1981, through the Naval Reserve Officers Training Corps. He served in the 2nd Reconnaissance Battalion during the Gulf War. Over the course of his career, Berger led the 3rd Battalion, 8th Marines on a deployment to Haiti, led a regimental combat team in Iraq, served at the Kosovo Force headquarters, and commanded the 1st Marine Division in Afghanistan. He later commanded the I Marine Expeditionary Force from 2014 to 2016; Marine Corps Forces, Pacific, and Fleet Marine Force, Pacific, from 2016 to 2018; and the Marine Corps Combat Development Command from 2018 to 2019.

As the commandant, he developed and began implementing Force Design 2030, a reform that is shifting the focus of the Marine Corps from the wars in Afghanistan and Iraq to preparing for the competition between the United States and China.

== Early life and education ==
David Hilberry Berger was born on December 21, 1959 in Delaware. He is a native of Woodbine, Maryland. He graduated from Glenelg High School in 1977.

Berger holds a bachelor's of science degree in engineering from Tulane University, and two Master's degrees, one in International Public Policy from Johns Hopkins University, and the other in Military Studies.

Berger's formal military education includes several courses. These were the United States Marine Corps Amphibious Reconnaissance School, Command and Staff College, and the School of Advanced Warfighting; the United States Army Infantry Officer Advanced Course, Ranger School, and Jumpmaster School; and the United States Navy Dive School.

== Marine career ==
=== Early career ===
Berger was commissioned as an infantry officer in 1981 through the Naval Reserve Officers Training Corps (NROTC) following graduation from Tulane University with a degree in engineering. He joined the ROTC program on the recommendation of his father to pay for college, and later decided to commission in the Marine Corps instead of the Navy. Berger chose the Marine option because he was impressed with the Marine instructors at the Naval ROTC.

As a lieutenant and captain, he served as rifle platoon commander in India Company, 3rd Battalion, 7th Marines, 1st Marine Division and later as a company commander and battalion operations officer in 2nd Reconnaissance Battalion during Operation Desert Storm. He also served as an officer selection officer in Roanoke, Virginia. As a field grade officer, Berger was an instructor at Marine Aviation Weapons and Tactics Squadron One in Yuma, Arizona; instructor at III Marine Expeditionary Force (MEF) Special Operations Training Group; and served on the Joint Staff as a policy planner in the Strategic Plans and Policy Directorate, J-5. Berger commanded 3rd Battalion, 8th Marines from 2002 to 2004, deploying the battalion first to Okinawa, and later to Haiti in support of Operation Secure Tomorrow. As a colonel, Berger commanded Regimental Combat Team 8 in Fallujah, Iraq, during Operation Iraqi Freedom.

=== General officer ===
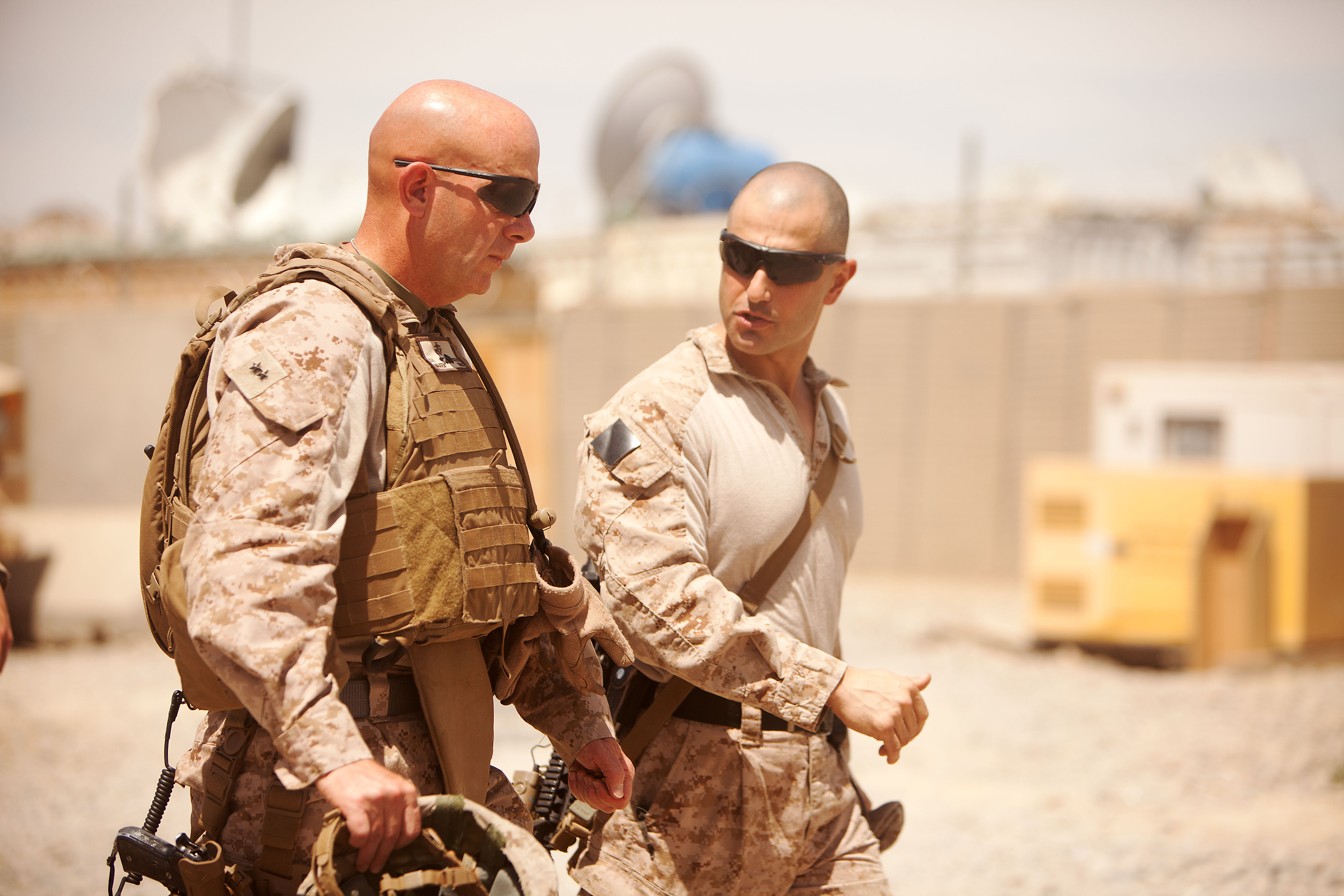
General Berger (left) visits Marine forces in Helmand Province, Afghanistan, in 2012

While serving as assistant division commander of 2nd Marine Division, Berger was appointed to the rank of brigadier general. He then deployed to Kosovo, where he served for one year as chief of staff for Kosovo Force (KFOR) Headquarters in Pristina. From 2009 to 2011 he served at Headquarters Marine Corps as the Director of Operations in Plans, Policies, and Operations. In 2012 he deployed to Afghanistan as the commanding general of 1st Marine Division (forward) in support of Operation Enduring Freedom. As the commander of the division, which was based out of Camp Leatherneck in Afghanistan, he oversaw operations in the Helmand Province.

Berger started serving as commanding general of Marine Air Ground Task Force Training Command and the Marine Corps Air Ground Combat Center on January 11, 2013. In July 2014, Berger was promoted to the rank of lieutenant general and assumed command of I Marine Expeditionary Force. On August 26, 2016, he was appointed to the posts of commander, United States Marine Corps Forces, Pacific, and commanding general, Fleet Marine Force, Pacific. During his time in that position he worked to strengthen the partnership between the U.S. Marine Corps and its local allies in Japan, Korea, Australia, and the Philippines, including by increasing the size of the Marine Rotational Force in Darwin, Australia to a Marine air–ground task force. He also oversaw the introduction of the F-35 Lightning II and the expansion in the usage of the Bell Boeing V-22 Osprey.

On August 28, 2018, Berger took up his new post as the Commanding General of Marine Corps Combat Development Command and Deputy Commandant for Combat Development and Integration. His appointed to that position happened around the time that the military began focusing on the rise of China. As the head of MCCDC, he began considering how the knowledge he gained while commanding Marine forces in the Pacific could be applied to the Corps. Berger oversaw a wargame at the Naval War College that simulated a potential conflict in that region, and its results influenced his policies when he later became the commandant. According to him, the wargame showed that mobility and sustaining forces in the Western Pacific were going to be challenges in such a conflict, but with certain changes, the Marine Corps could have an important role in sea-control and sea-denial operations.

=== Commandant ===
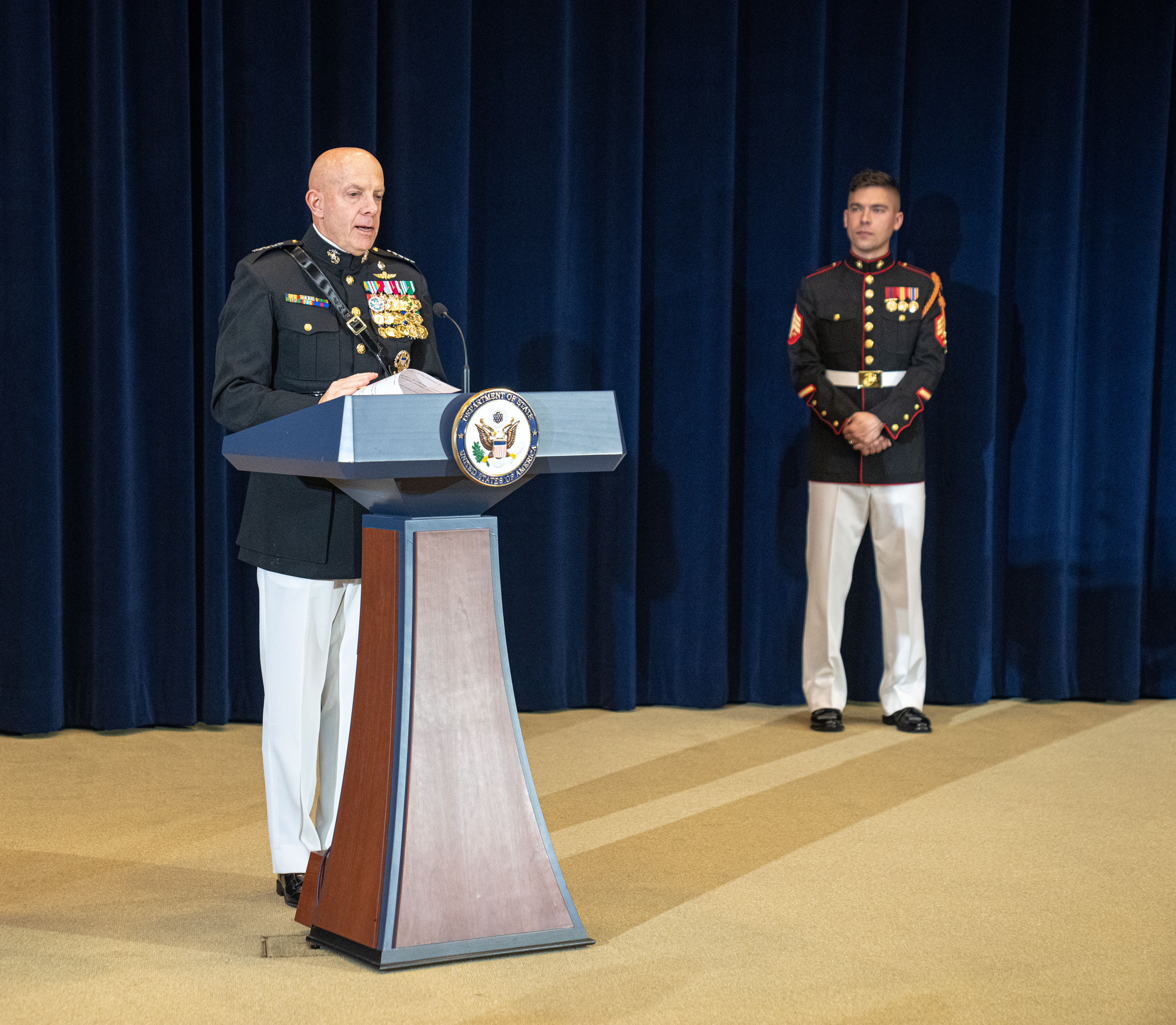
Berger at the State Department during the 247th Marine Corps birthday celebrations in 2022

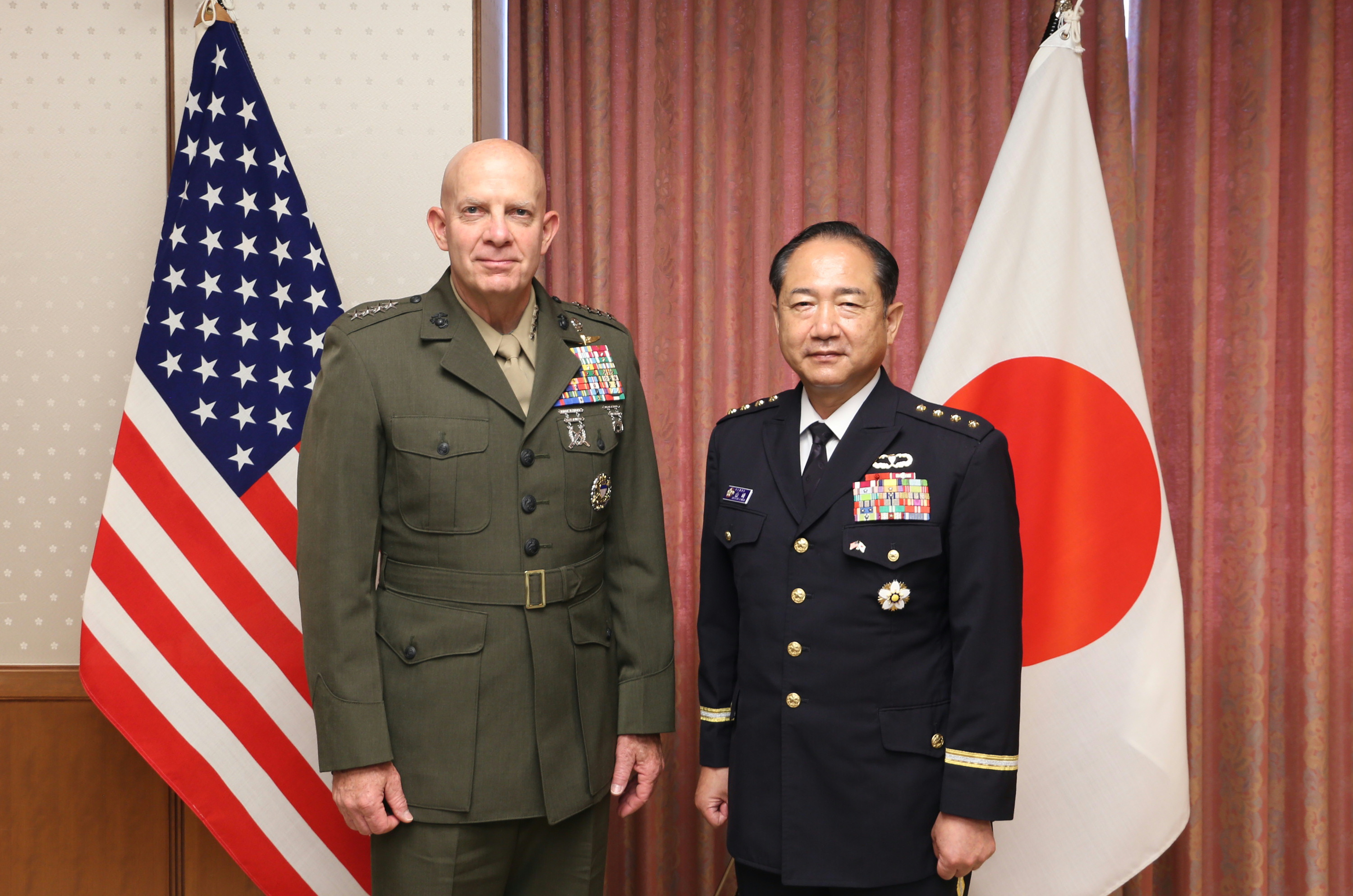
Berger with General Koji Yamazaki, the Chief of Staff, Joint Staff, Japan Self Defense Forces, in 2022

Berger was interviewed by Navy Secretary Richard V. Spencer and was chosen out of several candidates to become the 38th commandant of the United States Marine Corps, because Spencer believed that the Marine Corps will need significant changes. On March 26, 2019, he was nominated by President Donald Trump to succeed General Robert Neller and become the commandant. He was confirmed by the United States Senate on June 5, and took command in a ceremony held July 11 at the Marine Barracks in Washington D.C.

==== Modernization ====
One day after taking office, on July 12, 2019, Berger issued the Commandant's Planning Guidance, setting out his vision for the Marine Corps. He concluded in the document that the Corps needed major changes to align it with the 2018 National Defense Strategy, which prioritizes the strategic competition between the United States and China. His restructuring plan, Force Design 2030, was announced in March 2020. It has been described as the biggest transformation of the Marine Corps in decades, changing the service's focus on the threat of China and preparing Marines to operate within the range of Chinese weapons systems in the Western Pacific, such as in the first island chain and the South China Sea. To accomplish this, Berger stated that the Marine Corps must become a lighter expeditionary force.

The core of Force Design 2030 is establishing smaller units of Marines known as littoral regiments that will be equipped with drones and missile systems and can move quickly between islands in the Pacific, to counter the threat from Chinese missiles and the People's Liberation Army Navy. Teams from the Marine littoral regiments could be moved from island to island using amphibious ships, staying at each location for a short time, and would help the United States Navy target the enemy fleet. As part of this, Force Design refocuses the Marine Corps on high-end combat, shifting away from legacy platforms like tanks and cannon artillery in favor of long-range missiles and drones. All 452 tanks of the Marine Corps are to be transferred to the Army by 2023, and the majority of traditional cannon artillery will be replaced by rocket artillery, such as the High Mobility Artillery Rocket System (HIMARS). The first of the littoral regiments created by Force Design, the 3rd Marine Littoral Regiment, was activated in March 2022.

Force Design 2030 has caused controversy and debate within the Marine Corps. Politico reported that there are thirty retired Marine generals who oppose the changes brought by Force Design, including every living former Commandant, and some of them formed a dedicated group to lobby against it. Berger had a meeting with members of this group on March 3, 2022, though the retired generals left the meeting unsatisfied. Berger has defended the plan from the critics, pointing out that in "every single exercise, every war game ... the outcome in the future was not going to be good if we didn't make some kind of changes." According to Admiral Scott Swift, who commanded the Pacific Fleet when Berger was the head of Marine Forces in the Pacific, the plan is based on a combination of Berger's experiences and a series of wargames. Swift said that Berger "understood the challenges he was taking on and how he would be criticized, but he had done enough study." Berger also said that he has listened to suggestions from the critics and used them to make changes to the plan.

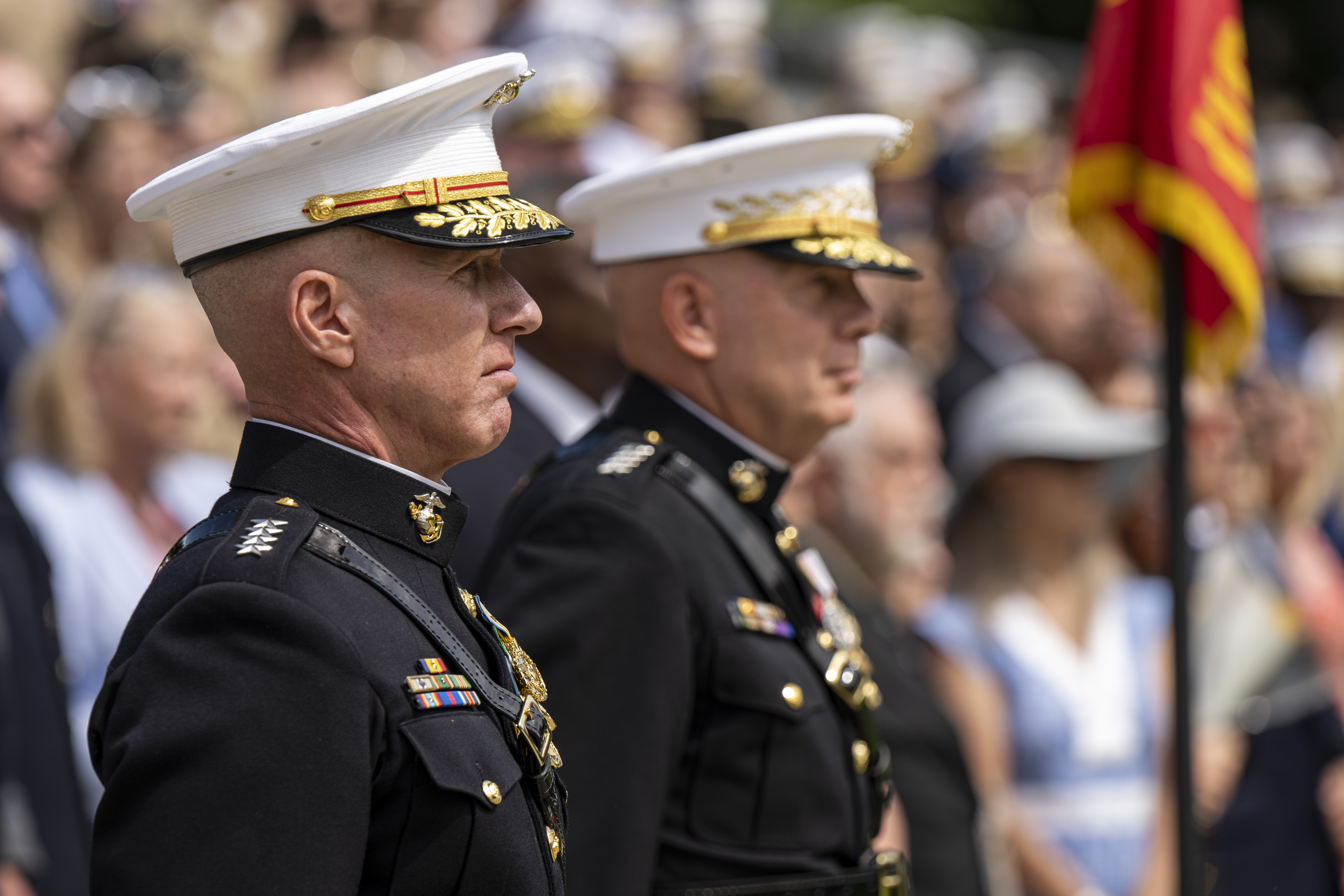
Berger (right) relinquishing command to Assistant Commandant Lt. Gen. Eric Smith, in 2023

Berger's reforms had the support of the Department of Defense, including defense secretaries Mark Esper and Lloyd Austin, as well as the defense committees of the House and Senate. His main focus during his term as commandant was on making changes to equipment, and he said that other aspects of Force Design 2030 will be the focus of his successor.

==== Other work ====
In 2020 he oversaw the response of the Corps to COVID-19 pandemic, including the decision to keep its recruit training and field exercises going in the early months of the pandemic. Later that year he banned the display of Confederate flags on Marine Corps bases. In February 2022, Berger was the keynote speaker for the 67th MSC Student Conference on National Affairs at Texas A&M University.

In January 2023 the Washington Post reported that Berger and Air Force General Charles Q. Brown Jr. were being considered by the White House as the two leading candidates to become the next Chairman of the Joint Chiefs of Staff when Mark Milley retired from the post in September. Brown ended up being selected for the role. Berger's term as the Commandant of the Marine Corps ended on July 10, 2023, with him relinquishing office to his assistant commandant, Eric Smith, and retiring from the military.

== Later life and work ==
In 2024, Berger was named as a Senior Fellow at the Johns Hopkins Applied Physics Laboratory.

== Awards and decorations ==
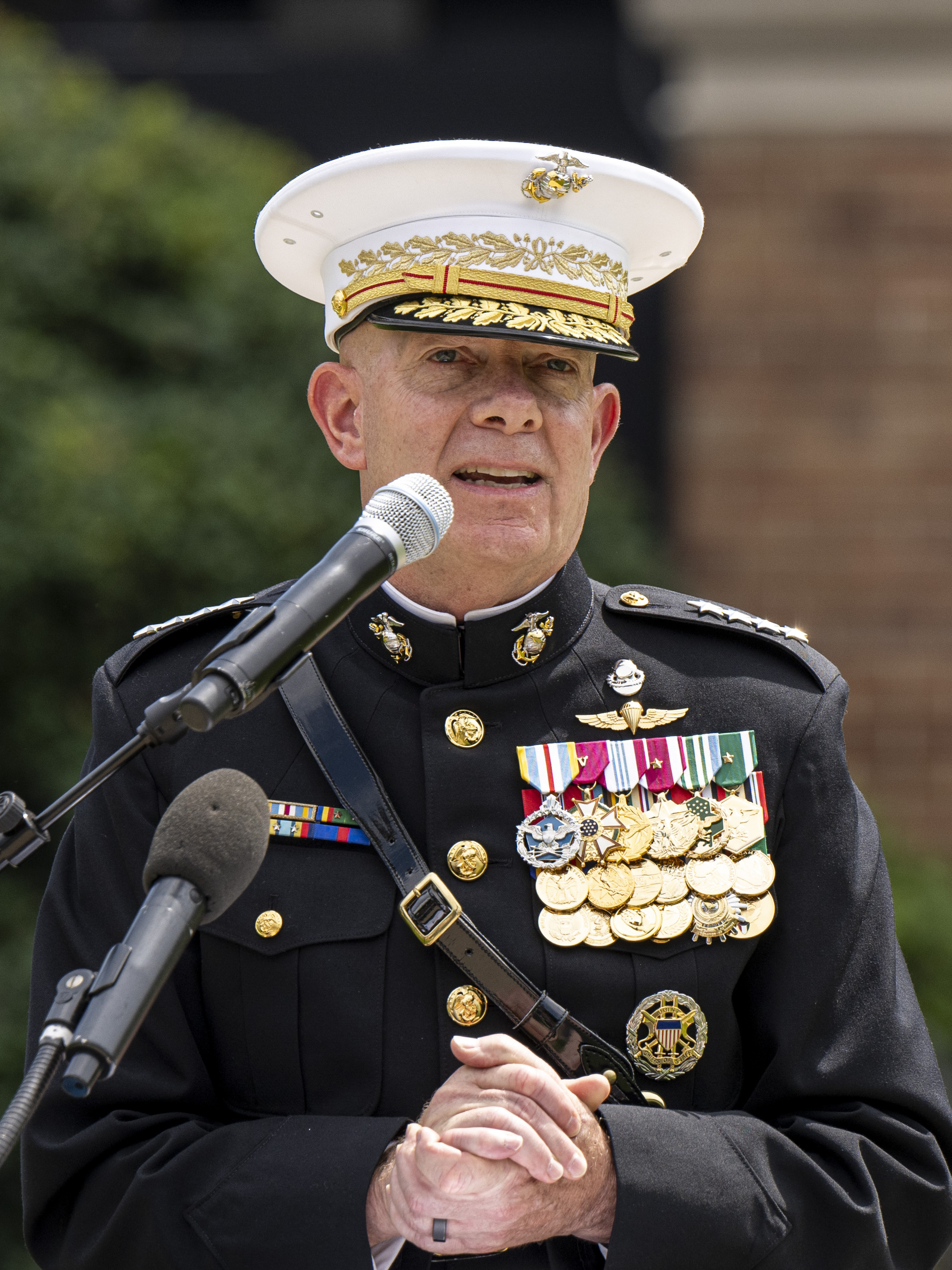
General Berger wearing his medals

SCUBA Diver Badge
Navy and Marine Corps Parachutist Insignia
Navy Distinguished Service Medal		Defense Superior Service Medal	
Legion of Merit w/ valor device	Defense Meritorious Service Medal	Meritorious Service Medal w/ 1 award star	Joint Service Commendation Medal
Navy Commendation Medal w/ 1 award star	Combat Action Ribbon w/ 1 award star	Joint Meritorious Unit Award	Navy Unit Commendation w/ 2 service stars
Navy Meritorious Unit Commendation w/ 3 service stars	National Defense Service Medal w/ 1 service star	Armed Forces Expeditionary Medal	Southwest Asia Service Medal w/ 3 service stars
Kosovo Campaign Medal w/ 1 service star	Afghanistan Campaign Medal w/ 1 service star	Iraq Campaign Medal w/ 2 service stars	Global War on Terrorism Service Medal
Korea Defense Service Medal	Humanitarian Service Medal w/ 1 service star	Sea Service Deployment Ribbon w/ 10 service stars	Marine Corps Recruiting Service Ribbon
NATO Medal Non-Article 5 for the Balkans w/ 1 service star	Kuwait Liberation Medal (Saudi Arabia) w/ 1 award star	Kuwait Liberation Medal (Kuwait)	Grand Cordon of the Order of the Rising Sun
Expert Rifle Badge (5th award)		Expert Pistol Badge (2nd award)	
Joint Chiefs of Staff Identification Badge

== Dates of promotion ==
Rank	Branch	Date
Second lieutenant	Marine Corps	1981
First lieutenant	Marine Corps	
Captain	Marine Corps	
Major	Marine Corps	12 August 1992
Lieutenant colonel	Marine Corps	22 May 1998
Colonel	Marine Corps	1 May 2003
Brigadier general	Marine Corps	1 March 2007
Major general	Marine Corps	2 March 2011
Lieutenant general	Marine Corps	25 June 2014
General	Marine Corps	5 June 2019

== Personal life ==
He married his wife Donna in 1981, and they have four sons. One of them enlisted in the Marine Corps and another one became a Marine officer.

Military offices
Preceded by George W. Smith Jr.	Commander of the Marine Corps Air Ground Combat Center; 2013–2014	Succeeded by Lewis A. Craparotta
Preceded by John A. Toolan	Commanding General of the I Marine Expeditionary Force; 2014–2016	Succeeded by Lewis A. Craparotta
Preceded by John A. Toolan	Commander of the United States Marine Corps Forces, Pacific, and Commanding General of the Fleet Marine Force, Pacific; 2016–2018	Succeeded by Lewis A. Craparotta
Preceded by Robert S. Walsh	Commander of the Marine Corps Combat Development Command; 2018–2019	Succeeded by Eric Smith
Preceded by Robert Neller	Commandant of the Marine Corps; 2019–2023	Succeeded by Eric Smith
