= Eric E. Austin =

U.S. Marine Corps general officer

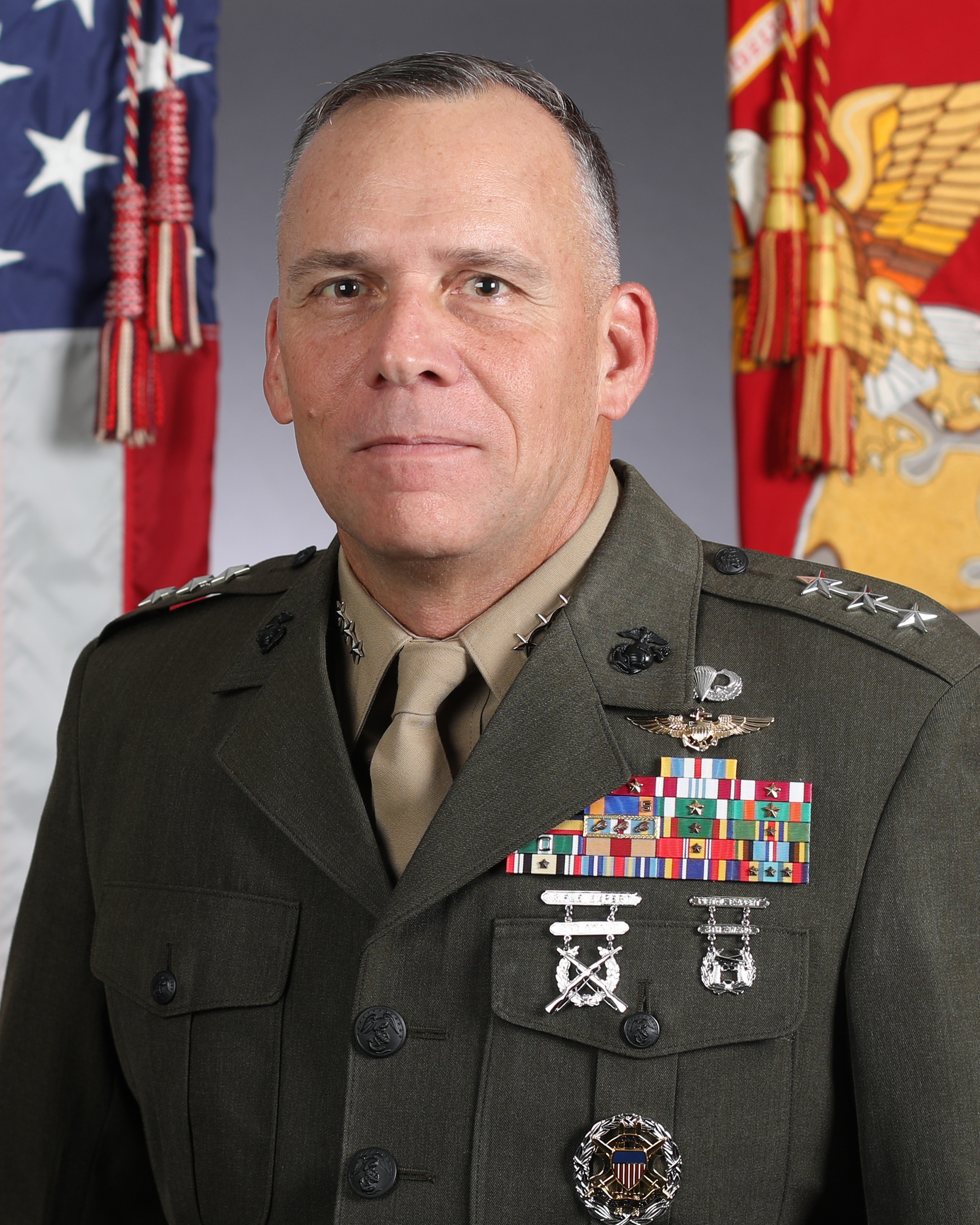
- Official portrait, 2024
- Born: c. 1969 (age 56–57)
- Military career
- Allegiance: United States
- Branch: United States Marine Corps
- Service years: 1991–present
- Rank: Lieutenant General
- Commands: Marine Corps Combat Development Command; 1st Marine Aircraft Wing; Marine Aircraft Group 14; VMFA-211
- Awards: Defense Superior Service Medal; Legion of Merit (3)

Eric Erskine Austin (born c. 1969) is a United States Marine Corps lieutenant general who has served as the deputy commandant for combat development and integration and commanding general of the Marine Corps Combat Development Command since 9 August 2024. He most recently served as the commanding general of the 1st Marine Aircraft Wing from 2022 to 2024. He previously served as the director of the Capabilities Development Directorate in the Office of the Deputy Commandant for Combat Development and Integration.

Austin graduated from the United States Naval Academy in 1991 with a B.S. degree in aeronautical engineering. He completed flight training in 1994. Austin later graduated from the National War College in 2010 with a master's degree in national security strategy.

In March 2024, Austin was nominated for promotion to lieutenant general and appointment as deputy commandant for combat development and integration.

Military offices
Preceded by Scott Benedict	Military Secretary to the Commandant of the Marine Corps; 2016–2017	Succeeded by Thomas J. Gordon
Preceded by Bradford Gering	Deputy Commander of the United States Marine Corps Forces Command; 2017–2018	Succeeded by Michael S. Cederholm
Preceded by Stephen M. Neary	Deputy Director for Joint Training of the Joint Staff; 2018–2020	Succeeded by Stephen E. Liszewski
Preceded by ???	Director of Capabilities Development of the United States Marine Corps; 2020–2022	Succeeded by Stephen J. Lightfoot
Preceded by Brian W. Cavanaugh	Commanding General of the 1st Marine Aircraft Wing; 2022–2024	Succeeded by Marcus B. Annibale
Preceded by Karsten Heckl	Deputy Commandant for Combat Development and Integration of the United States Marine Corps and Commanding General of the Marine Corps Combat Development Command; 2024–present	Incumbent
