= Michael Cederholm =

U.S. Marine Corps general

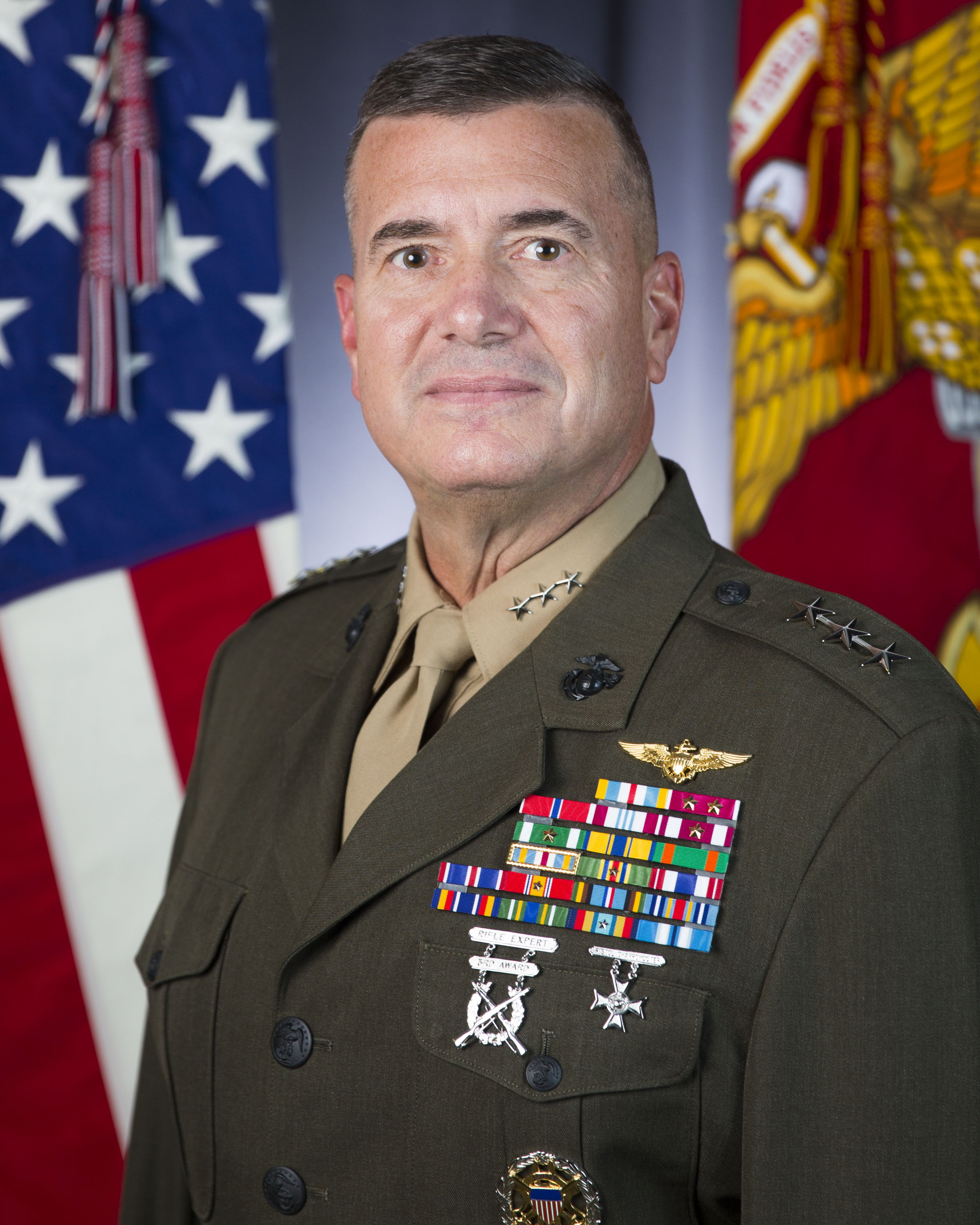
- Official portrait, 2022
- Born: 1966 (age 59–60); Camp Lejeune, North Carolina, U.S.
- Military career
- Allegiance: United States
- Branch: United States Marine Corps
- Service years: 1989–2025
- Rank: Lieutenant General
- Nickname: Homey
- Commands: I Marine Expeditionary Force; 2nd Marine Aircraft Wing; Marine Aircraft Group 31; VMFA-212
- Awards: Defense Superior Service Medal; Legion of Merit (3); Bronze Star Medal

Michael S. Cederholm (born 1966) is a retired United States Marine Corps lieutenant general who served as the commanding general of the I Marine Expeditionary Force. He previously commanded the 2nd Marine Aircraft Wing from 2020 to 2022.

== Early life and education ==
Cederholm was born at Camp Lejeune, North Carolina and raised in New Hartford, Connecticut, graduating from Northwestern Regional High School in 1984. He is the son of Roger and Silvia Cederholm. His father was a Marine Corps helicopter pilot. Cederholm is married to Rebecca Lyn Cederholm and he has five children.

Cederholm received his bachelor's degree in international politics from Wesleyan University. Cederholm played baseball and basketball in high school, attended Wesleyan on a baseball scholarship and then coached basketball at Terryville High School. At Wesleyan he joined Delta Kappa Epsilon fraternity. After receiving his Marine Corps commission as a second lieutenant in April 1989, he attended naval flight training in Pensacola, Florida, Beeville, Texas and El Toro, California. Cederholm later earned an M.S. degree in national security strategy from the National War College.

== Military career ==
Deputy Commandant for Aviation, HQMC (2022-2024)

In March 2023, he was nominated for assignment as the commanding general of I Marine Expeditionary Force.

Military offices
Preceded by Roger B. Turner	Military Secretary to the Commandant of the Marine Corps; 2014–2015	Succeeded by Scott Benedict
Preceded by Michael Langley	Deputy Director for Operations (Operations Team Three) of the Joint Staff; 2015–2017	Succeeded by Alexus Grynkewich
Preceded by Eric E. Austin	Deputy Commander of the United States Marine Corps Forces Command; 2018–2020	Succeeded by Michael Langley
Preceded by Karsten Heckl	Commanding General of the 2nd Marine Aircraft Wing; 2020–2022	Succeeded by Scott Benedict
Preceded by Mark R. Wise	Deputy Commandant for Aviation of the United States Marine Corps; 2022–2024	Succeeded by Bradford Gering
Preceded by Bradford Gering; Acting	Commanding General of I Marine Expeditionary Force; 2024–2025	Succeeded by Christian Wortman
