= George W. Smith (USMC) =

U.S. Marine Corps Major General

George William Smith
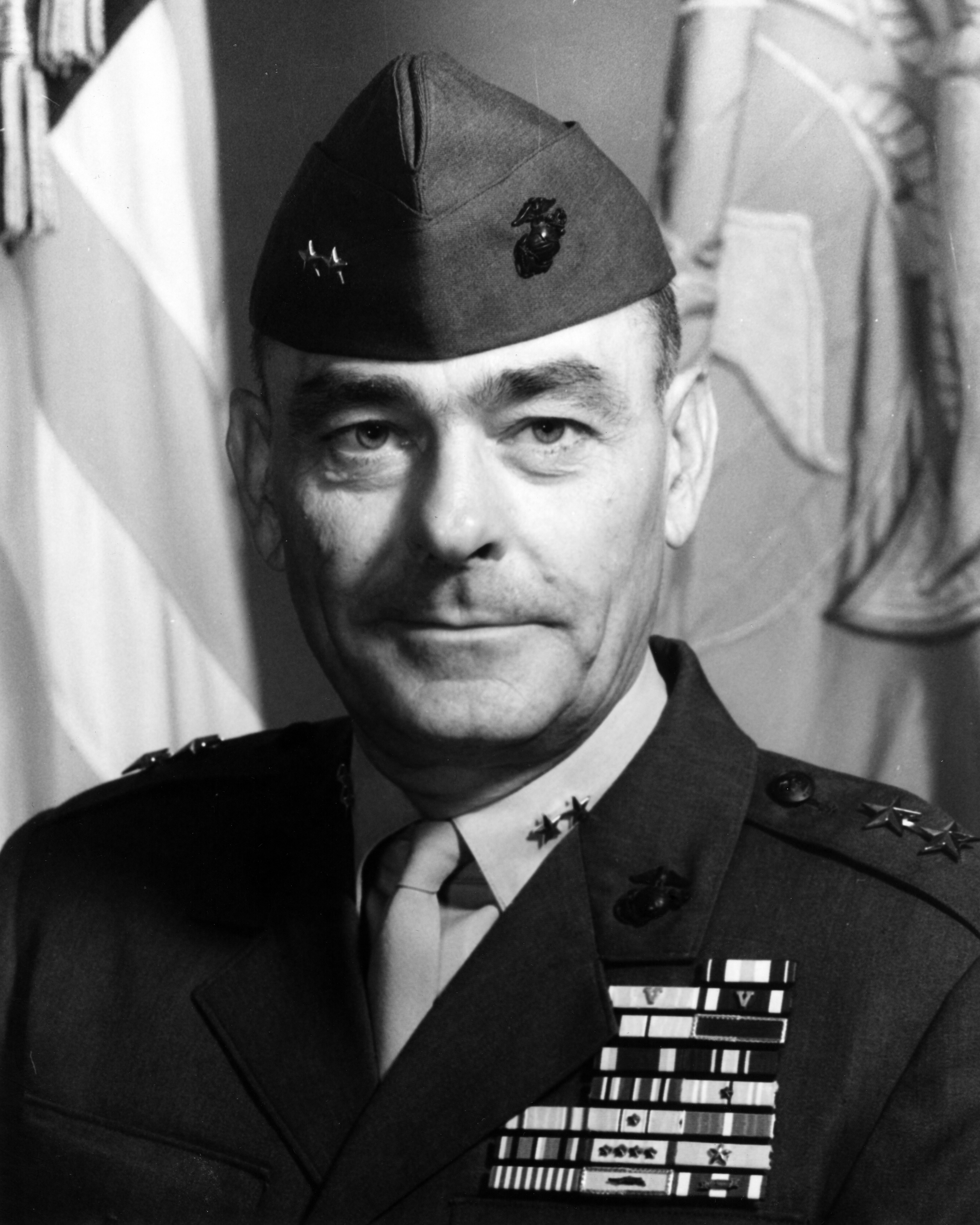
- MG George W. Smith, USMC
- Born: July 8, 1925; Harrisburg, Pennsylvania, U.S.
- Died: September 30, 2014 (aged 89); Newport Beach, California, U.S.
- Burial place: Arlington National Cemetery
- Relatives: George W. Smith Jr. (son)
- Military career
- Allegiance: United States
- Branch: United States Marine Corps
- Service years: 1943–1977
- Rank: Major general
- Service number: 0-50104
- Commands: 3rd Marine Division; 1st Marine Brigade; The Basic School; 1st Battalion, 9th Marines
- Conflicts: World War II: Battle of Okinawa; Korean War; Vietnam War: Operation Dewey Canyon; Operation Purple Martin; Operation Utah Mesa
- Awards: Silver Star; Legion of Merit (2); Navy Commendation Medal

George William Smith (July 8, 1925 – September 30, 2014) was a decorated officer in the United States Marine Corps who rose to the rank of Major General. He began his 34-year career as an Enlisted Reservist during World War II, later integrating into the regular Marine Corps and distinguishing himself as commanding officer, 1st Battalion, 9th Marines during the Vietnam War. His last assignment was commanding general, 3rd Marine Division on Okinawa, Japan.

Both of his sons followed his footsteps and joined the Marine Corps. His elder son, George W. Smith Jr., as of 2019 serves as lieutenant general and commander of I Marine Expeditionary Force, while Andrew H. Smith as of 2019 serves as colonel and chief of staff, Marine Corps Recruit Depot Parris Island.

== Early career ==
George W. Smith was born on July 8, 1925, in Harrisburg, Pennsylvania, son of George Kobler and Myra Holder Smith. He graduated from the Camp Hill High School in summer 1943 and enlisted in the United States Marine Corps Reserve in September of that year. Smith completed boot camp and was attached to the 2nd Marine Division. He sailed to the Pacific theater in early 1945 and took part in the Okinawa Campaign in May and June of that year.

Following his return to the United States, Smith reached the rank of corporal and remained on active duty until his discharge in February 1946. He then went to the Dickinson College in Carlisle, Pennsylvania, where he graduated in summer 1949 with a Bachelor of Science degree in political science. Smith was commissioned second lieutenant in the Marine Corps Reserve in March 1949 and attached as a platoon leader to the 6th Reserve Infantry Battalion in Harrisburg.

During his time with that unit, Smith completed the Associate Armored Company Officers Course at Army Armor School at Fort Knox, Kentucky, in December 1950 and then completed the 3rd Special Basic Course at Marine Corps Schools, Quantico, in 1951. Smith was subsequently called to active duty and transferred to Camp Lejeune, North Carolina, for service as a platoon leader with the 2nd Tank Battalion, 2nd Marine Division under Major General Edwin A. Pollock.

Smith was later appointed aide and assistant secretary to the Joint Landing Force Board. While in this capacity, he was promoted to the rank of first lieutenant in April 1951. Smith served again with the 2nd Tank Battalion from December 1952 and, following his promotion to captain in July 1953, he was appointed company commander.

Smith was integrated into the regular Marine Corps in December 1953 and deployed to the Far East in April 1954. He was attached to the 3rd Marine Division under Major General James P. Riseley at Okinawa, Japan, and participated in the several amphibious exercises, during which his division served as the defense force of Far Eastern area. Smith was ordered to Korea in February 1955, when he was appointed an assistant operations officer with the 1st Tank Battalion, 1st Marine Division under Major General Merrill B. Twining.

Smith returned stateside in May 1955 and assumed duty as a tactics instructor at the Basic School at Quantico, Virginia. In this capacity, he participated in the training of newly commissioned marine officers until June 1957, when he was ordered to the Amphibious Warfare School at Quantico for Junior Course. Smith graduated in June 1958 and returned to the 1st Marine Division under Major General Edward W. Snedeker. He served at Camp Pendleton, California, as a rifle company commander and later as infantry battalion operations officer with 3rd Battalion, 5th Marines and was promoted to major in December 1958. His battalion was later ordered to Okinawa and temporarily attached to the 3rd Marine Division under Major General David M. Shoup.

Smith's second tour of duty on Okinawa ended in February 1961 and he reported for duty to Marine Barracks, Washington, D.C., as operations and training officer. He was transferred to Northwestern University in Evanston, Illinois, in July 1963 and served as Marine Officer Instructor within the Naval ROTC unit until June 1966. He was meanwhile promoted to lieutenant colonel in July 1965. Smith was subsequently ordered to Korea for duty as the G-2 and G-3 Advisor, Marine Corps Component, United States Naval Advisory Group, Korea and remained there until the end of August 1968.

== Vietnam War ==
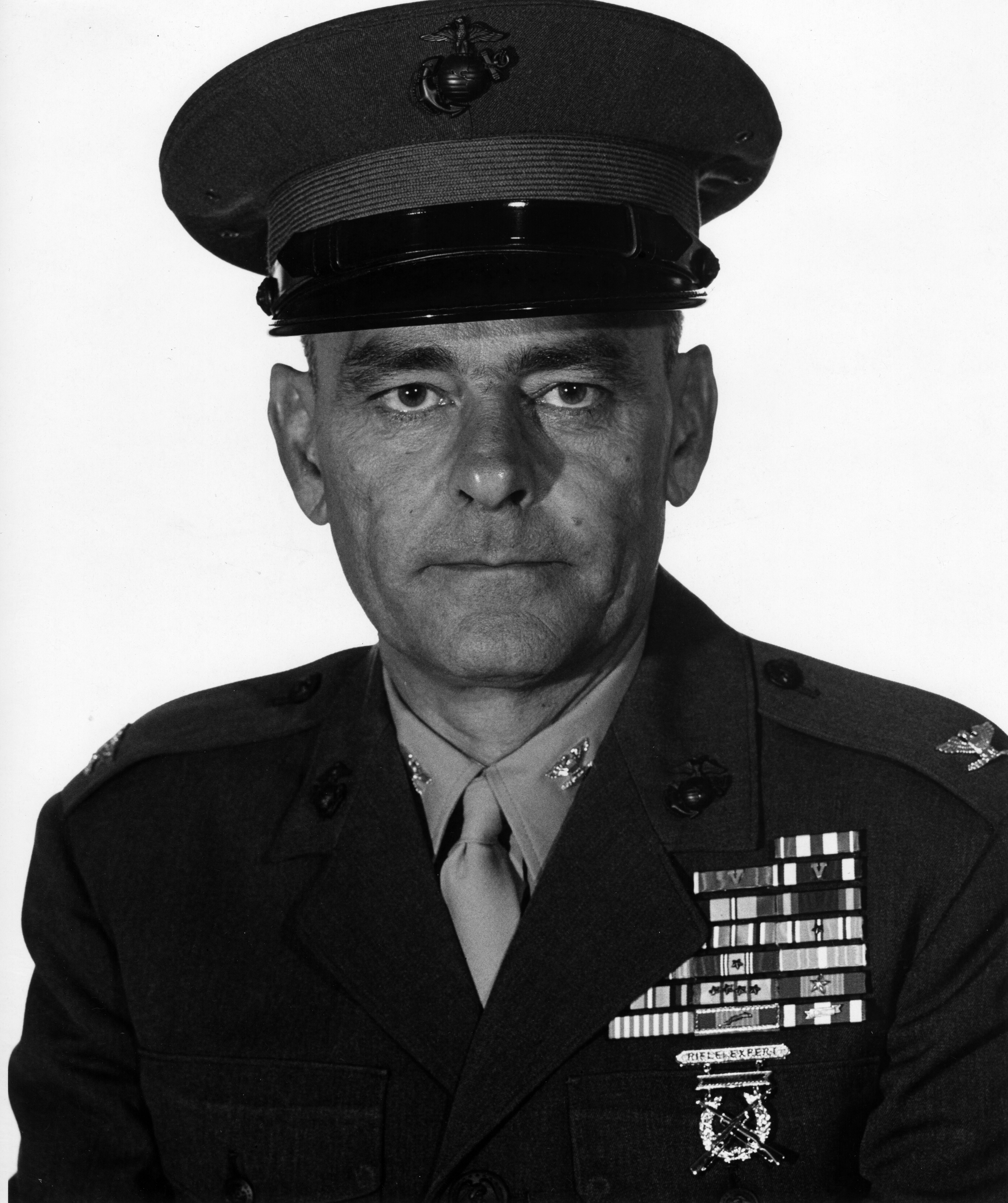
Smith as Colonel following his return from South Vietnam in June 1970

Smith was deployed to South Vietnam in 1968 and assumed command of the 1st Battalion, 9th Marines, 3rd Marine Division, stationed in the Vietnamese Demilitarized Zone. He led his battalion during the series of jungle patrols along the McNamara Line, during which his unit reduced the enemy's manpower and materiel assets in the northern sector of the I Corps Tactical Zone.

At the beginning of 1969, commanding general of 3rd Marine Division, Raymond G. Davis, ordered a series of combat operations in order to stop PAVN infiltration into South Vietnam across the border and along the Ho Chi Minh Trail. Operation Dewey Canyon was commenced on January 22, 1969, and Smith and his battalion deployed to Da Krong Valley not far from the Laotian border on February 10.

Smith led his battalion through rugged mountains into triple-canopied jungle and manoeuvred along two parallel precipitous ridge lines against increased hostile resistance when the lead company was pinned down by intense enemy fire. Realizing the urgency of maintaining the momentum of the attack, Smith, undaunted by the hostile rounds impacting near him, unhesitatingly moved across the fire-swept terrain to a dangerously exposed forward position where he could better observe and control supporting arms fire and aggressive assaults to route the North Vietnamese force. Immediately establishing a landing zone for the extraction of the wounded, he repeatedly exposed himself to hostile fire while moving about to coordinate and personally direct the medical evacuation of the casualties.

During the ensuing days, elements of his battalion successfully engaged and repulsed the enemy in a succession of both aggressive attacks and defensive actions, which carried the battalion to its objective, Hill 1044. Nearing the objective on February 26, Smith manoeuvred one of his infantry companies in a passage of lines and into a final assault that routed the North Vietnamese and resulted in the seizure of the objective and the capture of one of the largest caches of enemy weapons, ammunitions and equipment uncovered thus far in the Vietnam War. Consolidating his position, he then employed his battalion as a covering force for another friendly unit until March 18, when he commenced the extraction of his companies. Despite the hostile fire directed against the command group and the landing zone, not a single aircraft was lost while the marines sustained a minimum of casualties. For his leadership and bravery during the operation, Smith was awarded the Silver Star.

Smith remained in the command of the 1st Battalion, 9th Marines until the end of March and subsequently was appointed operations officer of Task Force Delta under Brigadier General Frank E. Garretson. The Task Force Delta was located at Vandegrift Combat Base in western Quang Tri Province and essentially functioned as 3rd Marine Division Forward Headquarters. While in this capacity, Smith coordinated and supervised the activities of his staff and rendered invaluable assistance in developing plans for seven major combat operations, including Operations Purple Martin and Utah Mesa. He was reassigned as a special projects officer in the office of the assistant division commander under Brigadier General Regan Fuller on July 11, 1969, and concurrently served as base coordinator of the Quang Tri Combat Base until October 1969, when he was ordered back to the United States. Smith was awarded the Legion of Merit with Combat "V" for his service with Task Force Delta and the Navy Commendation Medal with Combat "V" for his service at Quang Tri. He also received Vietnam Gallantry Cross with Star.

== Later career ==
Upon his return to the United States, Smith was ordered to the Headquarters Marine Corps in Washington, D.C., and served as assistant head, and later as head, of Operations Branch, Operations Division. He was promoted to colonel in January 1970 and ordered to the course at the Army War College at Carlisle Barracks, Pennsylvania, in July. Smith graduated in June 1971 and assumed command of The Basic School at Marine Corps Base Quantico, Virginia.

Smith was responsible for the basic training of newly commissioned officers until May 1973, when he was sent to Philadelphia for duty as director, 4th Marine Corps Reserve and Recruitment District. While in this capacity, Smith had direction over a number of reserve units and recruitment stations in Pennsylvania, Ohio, New Jersey, and Delaware. His duty included also inspection of reserve and recruitment units, and to make calls on governors and other public officials.

Smith was promoted to the rank of brigadier general on June 11, 1974, and ordered back to Headquarters Marine Corps, where he assumed duty as director, Information Systems Support and Management Division. He was ordered to Hawaii in June 1975 and appointed commanding general, 1st Marine Brigade (Reinforced), Fleet Marine Force, Pacific.

Smith was promoted to the rank of major general in July 1976 and ordered to Okinawa, Japan, for duty as commanding general, 3rd Marine Division. His unit served as the defense force of the Far Eastern area and Smith distinguished himself, when instituted the new personnel staffing procedures, innovative maintenance management programs, and superb individual and mission-oriented training programs. An increased combat readiness was accomplished despite manpower reductions, severe logistical constraints, and organizational turbulence caused by the Combat Services Support reorganization. Smith remained in that command until July 1977 and received his second Legion of Merit. He was subsequently ordered back to the United States and retired on August 1, 1977.

== Retirement ==
Following his retirement, Smith and his wife settled in Newport Beach, California, where he enjoyed rounds of golf with his family. He and his wife of 60 years, Nancy Louise Reese had two daughters, Deborah Smith of Pensacola, Florida, and Dr. Anne Stover of Boardman, and two sons, George W. Smith Jr. (who currently serves as marine lieutenant general) and Andrew H. Smith (a marine colonel).

Major General George W. Smith died at his home in Newport Beach, California, on September 30, 2014, and was buried with full military honors at Arlington National Cemetery, Virginia.

== Decorations ==
Below is the ribbon bar of major General George W. Smith:

1st Row	Silver Star			Legion of Merit with Combat "V" and one 5/16" Gold Star
2nd Row	Navy Commendation Medal with Combat "V"	Combat Action Ribbon	Army Presidential Unit Citation	Navy Unit Commendation
3rd Row	Meritorious Unit Commendation	American Campaign Medal	Asiatic-Pacific Campaign Medal with one 3/16 inch service star	World War II Victory Medal
4th Row	National Defense Service Medal with one star	Korean Service Medal	Armed Forces Expeditionary Medal	Vietnam Service Medal with four 3/16 inch service stars
5th Row	Vietnam Gallantry Cross with Star	United Nations Korea Medal	Vietnam Gallantry Cross Unit Citation	Vietnam Campaign Medal

== See also ==
- List of 3rd Marine Division Commanders

Military offices
Preceded by Herbert L. Wilkerson	Commanding General, 3rd Marine Division; July 20, 1976 – July 16, 1977	Succeeded by Adolph G. Schwenk
