= Scott Benedict =

U.S. Marine Corps general

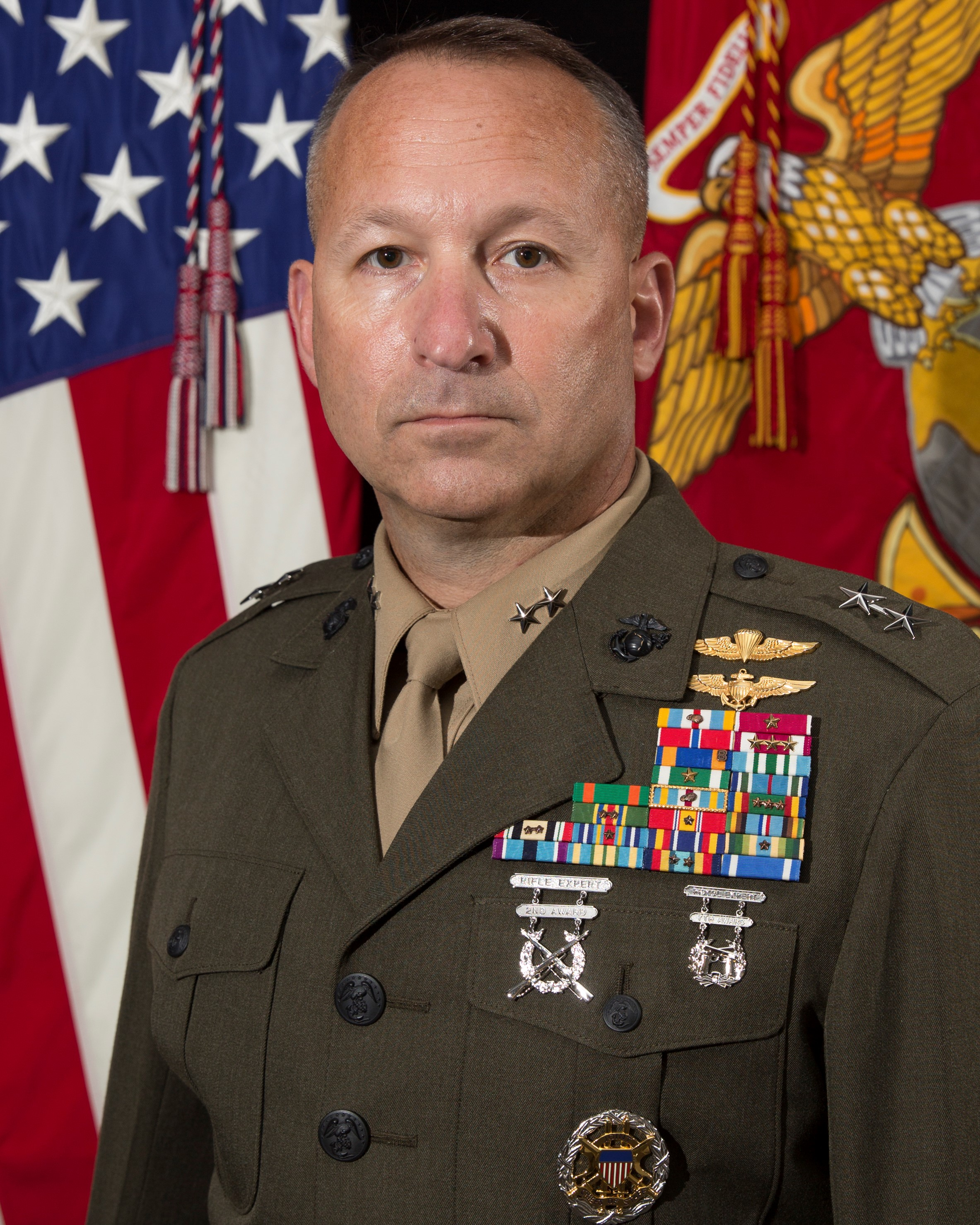
- Military career
- Allegiance: United States
- Branch: United States Marine Corps
- Service years: 1990–2024
- Rank: Major General
- Commands: 2nd Marine Aircraft Wing; 24th Marine Expeditionary Unit; HMLA-367

Scott F. Benedict is a retired United States Marine Corps major general who served as the commander of the 2nd Marine Aircraft Wing from 2022 to 2024. He most recently served as the Director of Strategy, Plans, and Policy of United States Central Command from 2020 to 2022.

Military offices
Preceded by Michael Cederholm	Military Secretary to the Commandant of the Marine Corps; 2015–2016	Succeeded by Eric E. Austin
Preceded by Gregg P. Olson	Deputy Director for Politico-Military Affairs (Middle East) of the Joint Staff; 2018–2020	Succeeded by Matthew G. Trollinger
Preceded by Michael E. Langley	Director of Strategy, Plans, and Policy of the United States Central Command; 2020–2022	Succeeded by Sean M. Salene
Preceded by Michael S. Cederholm	Commanding General of the 2nd Marine Aircraft Wing; 2022–2024	Succeeded by William H. Swan
