= Assistant Commandant of the Marine Corps =

Second highest-ranking officer in the U.S. Marine Corps

- Emblem of the Marine Corps

- Flag of a Marine Corps general

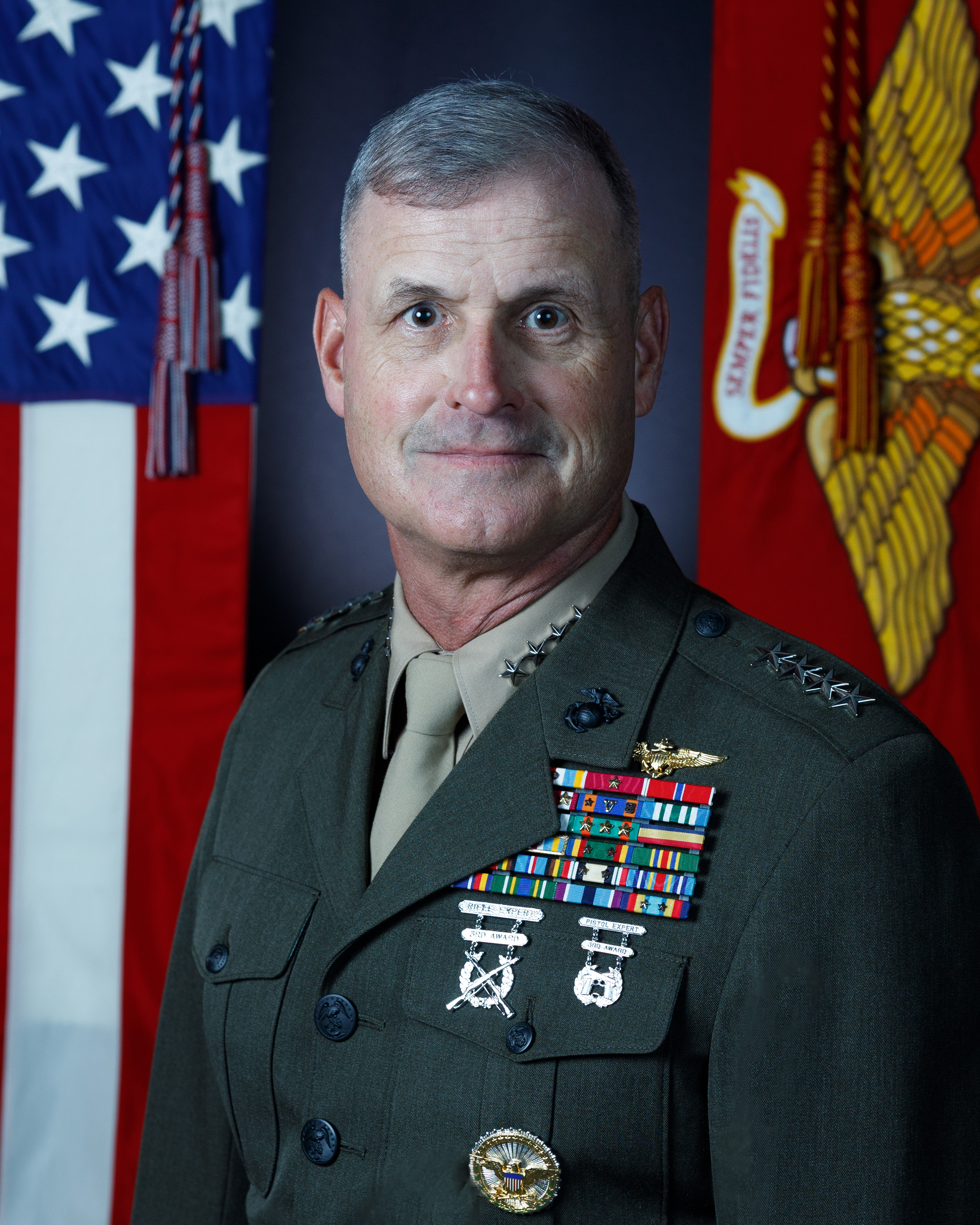
- Incumbent; General Bradford Gering since October 1, 2025
- Abbreviation: ACMC
- Reports to: Commandant of the Marine Corps
- Appointer: The president; with Senate advice and consent
- Formation: April 29, 1911
- First holder: Eli K. Cole

The assistant commandant of the Marine Corps (ACMC) is the second highest-ranking officer in the United States Marine Corps, and serves as a deputy for the commandant of the Marine Corps (CMC). Before 1946, the title was known as the assistant to the commandant.

The assistant commandant is nominated for appointment by the president and must be confirmed via majority vote by the Senate. If the commandant is absent or is unable to perform his duties, then the assistant commandant assumes the duties and responsibilities of the commandant. For this reason, the assistant commandant is appointed to a rank equal to the sitting commandant; since 1971, each assistant commandant has been, by statute, a four-star general, making it the most common rank held among marines serving this position. Additionally, he may perform other duties that the CMC assigns to him. Historically, the assistant commandant has served for two to three years. In recent decades, the assistant commandant has frequently been a Marine aviator. James F. Amos was the first aviator to serve as the assistant commandant and then be promoted to commandant.

The first marine to hold the billet as the "assistant to the commandant" was Eli K. Cole (Allen H. Turnage being the last), while Lemuel C. Shepherd Jr. was the first to hold it as the "assistant commandant".

== List of appointees ==
=== Assistants to the commandant of the Marine Corps ===
Before the official title of "Assistant Commandant of the Marine Corps" was adopted in 1946, the title of the position was known as "Assistant to the Commandant" and before 1918, known only as "Duty in the Office of the Commandant". No records exist before the outbreak of World War I about this position, possibly because the Commandant likely had only administrative staff and no deputy.

The first assistant to the commandant was Lieutenant Colonel (from 1914 Colonel) Eli K. Cole, who assumed the position on April 29, 1911. From April 29, 1911, to October 16, 1946, 19 men were assigned to assist the commandant, including five who later became commandant: John A. Lejeune, Wendell C. Neville, Ben H. Fuller, John H. Russell Jr., and Alexander A. Vandegrift.

No.	Portrait	Assistant to the Commandant of the Marine Corps	Took office	Left office	Time in office
1	Eli K. Cole	Colonel; Eli K. Cole (1867–1929)	April 29, 1911	January 1, 1915	3 years, 247 days
2	John A. Lejeune	Brigadier General; John A. Lejeune (1867–1942)	January 1, 1915	September 10, 1917	2 years, 252 days
3	Charles G. Long	Brigadier General; Charles G. Long (1869–1943)	September 11, 1917	August 13, 1920	2 years, 337 days
4	Wendell Cushing Neville	Brigadier General; Wendell Cushing Neville (1870–1930)	August 14, 1920	July 11, 1923	2 years, 331 days
5	Logan Feland	Major General; Logan Feland (1869–1936)	July 13, 1923	July 31, 1925	2 years, 18 days
6	Dion Williams	Brigadier General; Dion Williams (1869–1952)	August 1, 1925	July 1, 1928	2 years, 335 days
7	Ben Hebard Fuller	Brigadier General; Ben Hebard Fuller (1870–1937)	July 2, 1928	July 8, 1930	2 years, 6 days
8	John Twiggs Myers	Brigadier General; John Twiggs Myers (1871–1952)	August 1, 1930	February 1, 1933	2 years, 184 days
9	John H. Russell Jr.	Brigadier General; John H. Russell Jr. (1872–1947)	February 1, 1933	February 28, 1934	1 year, 27 days
10	Douglas C. McDougal	Brigadier General; Douglas C. McDougal (1876–1964)	April 8, 1934	April 22, 1935	1 year, 14 days
11	Louis M. Little	Brigadier General; Louis M. Little (1878–1960)	April 22, 1935	May 6, 1937	2 years, 14 days
12	Holland Smith	Brigadier General; Holland Smith (1882–1967)	April 1, 1939	September 25, 1939	177 days
13	Alexander Vandegrift	Brigadier General; Alexander Vandegrift (1887–1973)	March 1, 1940	November 18, 1941	1 year, 262 days
14	Charles D. Barrett	Brigadier General; Charles D. Barrett (1885–1943)	November 19, 1941	March 12, 1942	113 days
15	Ralph S. Keyser	Brigadier General; Ralph S. Keyser (1883–1955)	March 28, 1942	May 24, 1942	57 days
16	Harry Schmidt	Major General; Harry Schmidt (1886–1968)	May 25, 1942	August 1, 1943	1 year, 68 days
17	Keller E. Rockey	Major General; Keller E. Rockey (1888–1970)	August 2, 1943	January 17, 1944	168 days
18	Dewitt Peck	Major General; Dewitt Peck (1894–1973)	January 20, 1944	July 30, 1945	1 year, 191 days
19	Allen H. Turnage	Major General; Allen H. Turnage (1891–1971)	September 1, 1945	October 16, 1946	1 year, 45 days

=== Assistant commandants of the Marine Corps ===
In 1946, Congress established the position of "assistant commandant of the Marine Corps" and since then, 31 men have held the position. Major General Lemuel C. Shepherd Jr. was the first to hold the billet and went on to become commandant, as well as seven others: Randolph M. Pate, Leonard F. Chapman Jr., Robert H. Barrow, Paul X. Kelley, James F. Amos, Joseph Dunford and Eric M. Smith.

As with the commandant, the assistant commandant of the Marine Corps is appointed by the president based on advice and consent of the Senate and, once appointed, will be promoted to the grade of general. The duties of the assistant commandant include such authority and duties as the commandant – and with the approval of the secretary of the Navy – may delegate to or prescribe for him. Orders issued by the assistant commandant in performing such duties have the same effect as those issued by the commandant. When there is a vacancy in the office of the commandant of the Marine Corps, or during the absence or disability of the commandant, the assistant commandant shall perform the duties of the commandant until a successor is appointed or the absence or disability ceases.

No.	Portrait	Assistant Commandant of the Marine Corps	Took office	Left office	Time in office
1	Lemuel C. Shepherd Jr.	Major General; Lemuel C. Shepherd Jr. (1896–1990)	October 7, 1946	April 14, 1948	1 year, 190 days
2	Oliver P. Smith	Major General; Oliver P. Smith (1893–1977)	April 15, 1948	July 19, 1950	2 years, 95 days
3	Merwin H. Silverthorn	Lieutenant General; Merwin H. Silverthorn (1896–1985)	July 19, 1950	February 1, 1952	1 year, 197 days
4	Gerald C. Thomas	Lieutenant General; Gerald C. Thomas (1894–1984)	March 8, 1952	July 1, 1954	2 years, 115 days
5	Randolph M. Pate	Lieutenant General; Randolph M. Pate (1898–1961)	July 1, 1954	December 31, 1955	1 year, 183 days
6	Vernon E. Megee	Lieutenant General; Vernon E. Megee (1900–1992)	January 1, 1956	November 30, 1957	1 year, 333 days
7	Verne J. McCaul	Lieutenant General; Verne J. McCaul (1903–1968)	December 1, 1957	December 31, 1959	2 years, 30 days
8	John C. Munn	Lieutenant General; John C. Munn (1906–1986)	January 1, 1960	March 31, 1963	3 years, 89 days
9	Charles H. Hayes	Lieutenant General; Charles H. Hayes (1906–1995)	April 1, 1963	June 30, 1965	2 years, 90 days
10	Richard C. Mangrum	Lieutenant General; Richard C. Mangrum (1906–1985)	July 1, 1965	June 30, 1967	1 year, 364 days
11	Leonard F. Chapman Jr.	Lieutenant General; Leonard F. Chapman Jr. (1913–2000)	July 1, 1967	December 31, 1967	183 days
12	Lewis William Walt	General; Lewis William Walt (1913–1989)	January 1, 1968	January 29, 1971	3 years, 28 days
13	Keith B. McCutcheon	General; Keith B. McCutcheon (1915–1971)	January 30, 1971	March 11, 1971	40 days
14	Raymond G. Davis	General; Raymond G. Davis (1915–2003)	March 12, 1971	March 30, 1972	1 year, 18 days
15	Earl E. Anderson	General; Earl E. Anderson (1919–2015)	March 12, 1971	March 30, 1972	1 year, 18 days
16	Samuel Jaskilka	General; Samuel Jaskilka (1919–2012)	July 1, 1975	June 30, 1978	2 years, 364 days
17	Robert H. Barrow	General; Robert H. Barrow (1922–2008)	July 1, 1978	July 30, 1979	1 year, 29 days
18	Kenneth McLennan	General; Kenneth McLennan (1925–2005)	July 1, 1979	July 30, 1981	2 years, 29 days
19	Paul X. Kelley	General; Paul X. Kelley (1928–2019)	July 1, 1981	June 30, 1983	1 year, 364 days
20	John K. Davis	General; John K. Davis (1927–2019)	July 1, 1983	May 31, 1986	2 years, 334 days
21	Thomas R. Morgan	General; Thomas R. Morgan (1930–2024)	June 1, 1986	June 30, 1988	2 years, 29 days
22	Joseph J. Went	General; Joseph J. Went (born 1930)	July 1, 1988	July 31, 1990	2 years, 30 days
23	John R. Dailey	General; John R. Dailey (born 1934)	August 1, 1990	August 31, 1992	2 years, 30 days
24	Walter E. Boomer	General; Walter E. Boomer (born 1938)	September 1, 1992	July 14, 1994	1 year, 316 days
25	Richard D. Hearney	General; Richard D. Hearney (born 1939)	July 15, 1994	September 26, 1996	2 years, 73 days
26	Richard I. Neal	General; Richard I. Neal (1942–2022)	September 27, 1996	September 4, 1998	1 year, 342 days
27	Terrence R. Dake	General; Terrence R. Dake (born 1944)	September 5, 1998	September 7, 2000	2 years, 2 days
28	Michael J. Williams	General; Michael J. Williams (1943–2025)	September 8, 2000	September 9, 2002	2 years, 1 day
29	William L. Nyland	General; William L. Nyland (born 1946)	September 10, 2002	September 7, 2005	2 years, 362 days
30	Robert Magnus	General; Robert Magnus (born 1947)	September 8, 2005	July 2, 2008	2 years, 298 days
31	James F. Amos	General; James F. Amos (born 1946)	July 3, 2008	October 22, 2010	2 years, 111 days
32	Joseph F. Dunford Jr.	General; Joseph F. Dunford Jr. (born 1955)	October 23, 2010	December 15, 2012	2 years, 53 days
33	John M. Paxton Jr.	General; John M. Paxton Jr. (born 1951)	December 15, 2012	August 2, 2016	3 years, 231 days
34	Glenn M. Walters	General; Glenn M. Walters (born 1957)	August 2, 2016	October 2, 2018	2 years, 61 days
35	Gary L. Thomas	General; Gary L. Thomas (born 1962)	October 4, 2018	October 7, 2021	3 years, 3 days
36	Eric M. Smith	General; Eric M. Smith (born 1965)	October 8, 2021	September 22, 2023	1 year, 350 days
37	Christopher J. Mahoney	General; Christopher J. Mahoney	November 3, 2023	October 1, 2025	1 year, 332 days
38	Bradford Gering	General; Bradford Gering	October 1, 2025	Incumbent	1 year, 40 days

== See also ==
- Military Secretary to the Commandant of the Marine Corps
- Commandant of the Marine Corps
- Sergeant Major of the Marine Corps
- Vice Chief of Staff of the Army
- Vice Chief of Naval Operations
- Vice Chief of Staff of the Air Force
- Vice Chief of Space Operations
- Vice Commandant of the Coast Guard
