= Office of the Secretary of Defense Identification Badge =

US military badge

The OSD Identification Badge

The Office of the Secretary of Defense Identification Badge is a military badge issued to members of the United States Armed Forces who are permanently assigned to the Office of the Secretary of Defense (OSD) and its subordinate offices, and in addition, to some of the Defense Agencies and Department of Defense Field Activities.

== History ==
The badge was first created in 1949 and was referred to as the "National Military Establishment Identification Badge." In 1950, the badge was renamed as "Department of Defense Identification Badge." On December 20, 1962 the badge was given its current name.

== Award criteria ==
It is issued as a permanent decoration and is to be worn for the remainder of an individual's military career, provided that a service member served at least one year (two years for Reserve personnel not on active duty) in or in support of OSD. Personnel who are awarded the badge include all military personnel, when they are assigned on a permanent basis to any of the following organizational elements:

- The immediate offices of the Secretary and Deputy Secretary of Defense.
- The offices of the Under Secretaries of Defense.
- The offices of the Assistant Secretaries of Defense.
- The Office of the General Counsel of the Department of Defense.
- The Office of the Inspector General of the Department of Defense.
- The offices of the Assistants to the Secretary of Defense or Deputy Secretary of Defense.
- The Office of the Defense Advisor, U.S. Mission to NATO.
- The offices of the Directors of Net Assessment
- The Office of the Director of Administration and Management (DA&M)
- The Office of the Director of Operational Test and Evaluation (OT&E)
- Ballistic Missile Defense Organization (BMDO)
- Defense Advanced Research Projects Agency (DARPA)
- Defense Innovation Unit (DIU)
- Defense Security Cooperation Agency (DSCA)

== Notable recipients ==
- Chappie James
- Hal Moore
- Colin Powell
- Norman Schwarzkopf
- Andria Slough
- Dan Caine
- John F. Kelly
- James Mattis
- William N. Jackomis, PhD, MS

== In popular culture ==
- In the 1969 film Easy Rider, the leather jacket worn by Peter Fonda's character Wyatt ("Captain America") has an OSD Identification Badge affixed to the left breast.

== See also ==
- Military badges of the United States
