= Marine Corps Combat Development Command =

Major command of the U.S. Marine Corps

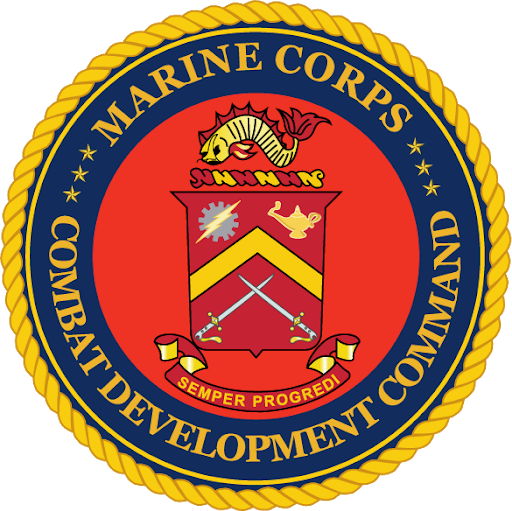
- MCCDC Insignia
- Active: 1921–present
- Country: United States of America
- Allegiance: United States of America
- Branch: United States Marine Corps
- Type: Major Command
- Role: Combat Development & Integration
- Part of: Headquarters Marine Corps
- Garrison/HQ: Marine Corps Base Quantico; Prince William County, Virginia, U.S.

Commanders
- DC, CD&I: Lieutenant General Eric E. Austin
- ADC, CD&I: Major General Phillip N. Frietze
- SgtMaj CD&I: Sergeant Major Peter A. Siaw
- Notable commanders: Eric Smith (general); Charles C. Krulak; David H. Berger; Robert S. Walsh

The Marine Corps Combat Development Command (MCCDC), located at Marine Corps Base Quantico in Prince William County, Virginia, is a major command of the United States Marine Corps (USMC), which has the mission of supporting the development of future operational concepts and the determination of how to best organize, train, educate and equip the Marine Corps of the future. Since 2005, the commanding general for the Marine Corps Combat Development Command (MCCDC) has been dual hatted as the Deputy Commandant, Combat Development & Integration (DC, CD&I).

== History ==
The predecessor to the MCCDC, Marine Corps Schools Quantico, was established in 1921 by the 13th Commandant of the United States Marine Corps, Major General John A. Lejeune. Prospects of a Pacific war led to the development of the concepts and techniques of amphibious warfare, which were then applied in the Pacific theater of World War II. On 1 Jan. 1968, the Marine Corps Schools was re-designated the Marine Corps Development and Education Command (MCDEC). On 10 Nov. 1987, the Marine Corps Combat Development Command (MCCDC) was created. In 2005 the commanding general for Marine Corps Combat Development Command was dual hatted as the deputy commandant for combat development and integration (DC, DC&I).

== Subordinate units ==
- Operational Analysis Directorate
- Capabilities and Development Directorate
- Marine Corps Warfighting Laboratory
