= Gregg P. Olson =

U.S. Marine Corps general

Gregg Peter Olson
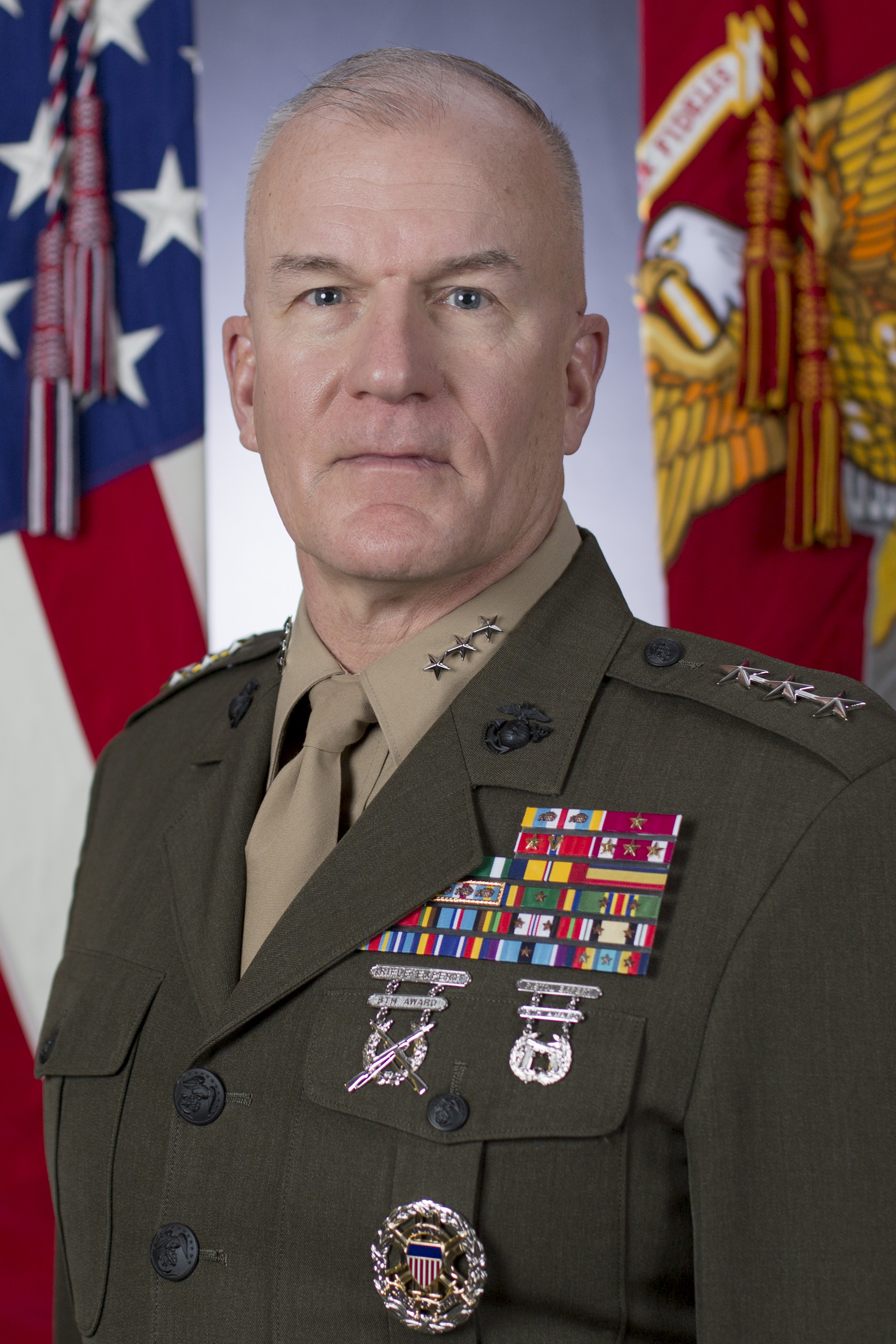
- Official portrait, 2022
- Military career
- Allegiance: United States
- Branch: United States Marine Corps
- Service years: 1985–2024
- Rank: Lieutenant General

Gregg P. Olson is a retired United States Marine Corps lieutenant general who served as the Director of the Marine Corps Staff from 2020 to 2024. Previously, he was the Assistant Deputy Commandant for Plans, Policies and Operations of the United States Marine Corps. Olson is a 1985 graduate of the United States Naval Academy.

Military offices
Preceded by Brian Beaudreault	Deputy Commander of the United States Marine Forces Central Command; 2012–2014	Succeeded by Carl E. Mundy III
Preceded by ???	Deputy Director for Politico-Military Affairs (Middle East) of the Joint Staff; 201?–2016	Succeeded by James Bierman
Preceded by Bryan G. Watson	Director of Operations and Cyber of the United States Africa Command; 2018–2019	Succeeded by William Gayler
Preceded by Norman Cooling	Assistant Deputy Commandant for Plans, Policies and Operations of the United States Marine Corps; 2019–2020	Succeeded by David Furness
Preceded by John J. Broadmeadow	Director of the Marine Corps Staff; 2020–2024	Succeeded by Paul J. Rock
