= Carl Mundy =

Carl Mundy could refer to:

- Carl Epting Mundy Jr. (1935–2014), 30th Commandant of the United States Marine Corps, father of Carl E. Mundy III
- Carl E. Mundy III (born 1960), United States Marine Corps Lieutenant General, son of Carl Epting Mundy Jr.
