= Joseph Clearfield =

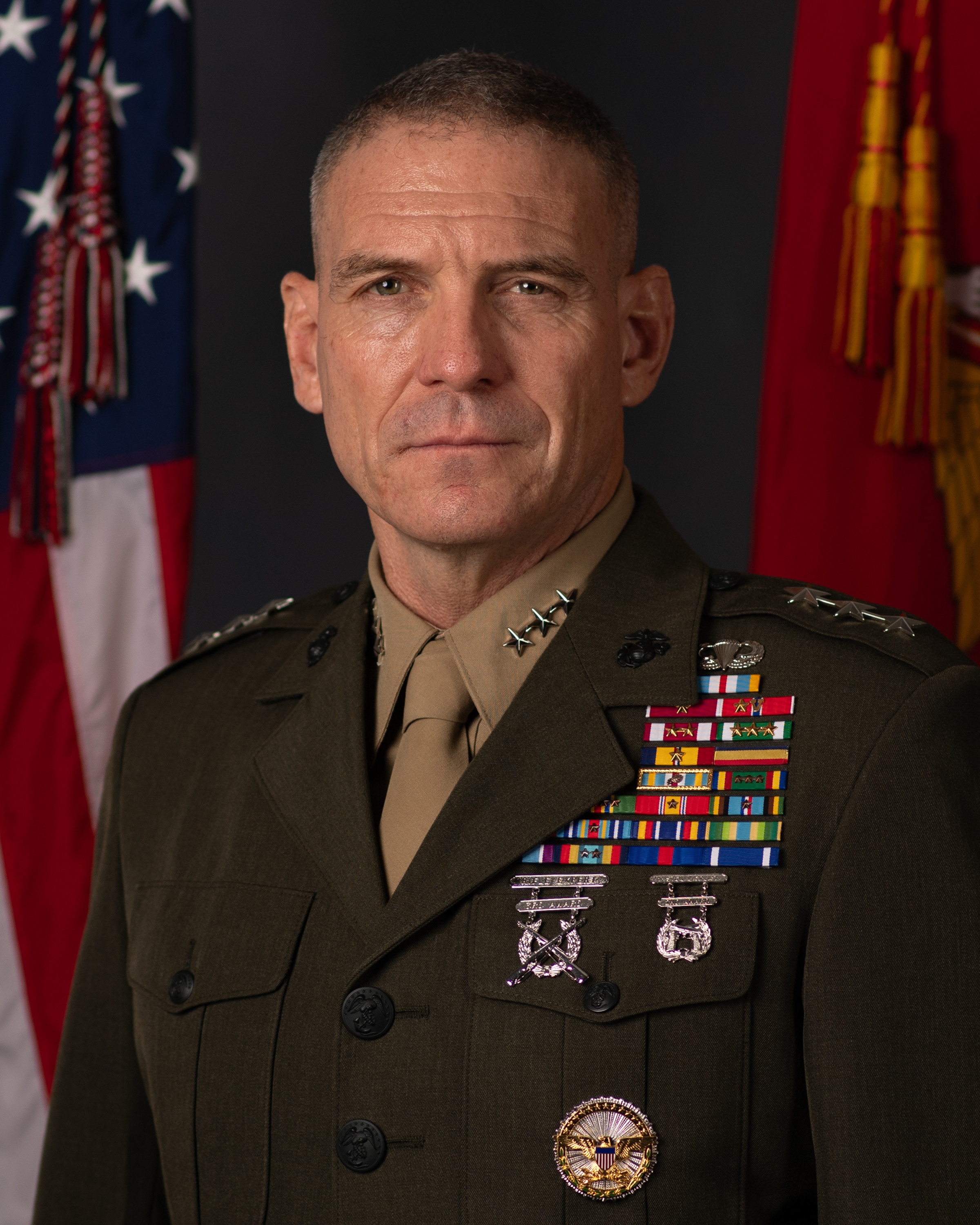
- Official portrait, 2025
- Born: c. 1969 or 1970 (age 57–58); Bethesda, Maryland
- Education: Union College (BA); Industrial College of the Armed Forces (MS); Duquesne University (MS)
- Military career
- Allegiance: United States
- Branch: United States Marine Corps
- Service years: 1993–present
- Rank: Lieutenant General
- Nickname: "J.R."
- Commands: United States Marine Corps Forces Central Command; 15th Marine Expeditionary Unit; 1st Battalion, 4th Marines
- Conflicts: Operation Uphold Democracy; War in Afghanistan; Iraq War; 2003 invasion of Iraq; First Battle of Fallujah; Piracy off the coast of Somalia; Recapture of M/V Magellan Star; 2026 Iran war

Joseph R. Clearfield (born c. 1969 or 1970) is an American lieutenant general who has served as commander of United States Marine Corps Forces Central Command since 2025. He previously served as deputy commander of Marine Corps Forces Central Command.

Clearfield was born in Bethesda, Maryland. He was commissioned as a United States Marine Corps officer in 1993 and graduated from The Basic School. He was deployed for Operation Uphold Democracy in Haiti and Operation Assured Response in Liberia. He later served at a recruiting station in Baltimore, Maryland, before deploying for the war in Afghanistan and the 2003 invasion of Iraq. Clearfield also took part in the First Battle of Fallujah during the Iraq War. His awards include two Bronze Stars with valor.

In 2010, while serving as commander of 1st Battalion, 4th Marines, he commanded the mission for the recapture of M/V Magellan Star from Somali pirates. Clearfield later commanded the 15th Marine Expeditionary Unit from 2016 to 2018 and then served in staff roles. These included as chief of staff of Marine Corps Forces Cyberspace Command, deputy commander of Marine Corps Forces Pacific, and senior military advisor to the United States Deputy Secretary of Defense.

== Early life and education ==
Joseph R. Clearfield was born in Bethesda, Maryland, c. 1969 or 1970. His father served in the United States Marine Corps during the Vietnam War, and his grandfather served in the United States Navy. Clearfield received a Bachelor of Arts degree in history from Union College in Schenectady, New York, and was commissioned as a Marine Corps infantry officer in 1993, having attended The Basic School.

His later education included a Master of Science degree in resource strategy at the Industrial College of the Armed Forces and a Master of Science in organizational leadership from Duquesne University. Clearfield's military education included the Marine Corps Command and Staff College, Amphibious Warfare School, and The Basic School; the United States Army Airborne School and Infantry Officer Course; the United States Navy Senior Officers Legal Course; and the Recruiting Management Course.

== Military career ==
Clearfield's assignments included serving as a platoon commander and executive officer in Company F, 2nd Battalion, 2nd Marines, from 1994 to 1997. During this time he was deployed for Operation Uphold/Restore Democracy in Haiti in 1994, Operation Strong Response in Norway in 1995, and Operation Assured Response in Liberia in 1996, while attached to the 22nd Marine Expeditionary Unit. From 1997 to 2000, he returned to the United States and served as operations officer and executive officer, Recruiting Station Baltimore, Maryland. During Clearfield's tenure, the station was named the 4th Marine Recruiting District's recruiting station of the year three times.

He served as commanding officer, Company I, 3rd Battalion, 1st Marines from 2001 to 2003, attached to 11th Marine Expeditionary Unit during Operation Enduring Freedom and Regimental Combat Team 1 during Operation Iraqi Freedom. Clearfield was an operations officer in 2nd Battalion, 1st Marines, from 2003 to 2004, during Operation Iraqi Freedom II including Operation Vigilant Resolve in Fallujah, Iraq. In 2005, he served as assistant head coach, and in 2006, as head coach of the United States Naval Academy Sprint Football Team, in addition to instructing midshipmen in combatives and ethics. By then, his awards included two Bronze Stars with the "V" device for valor in combat.

As a lieutenant colonel, in 2009, Clearfield became the commanding officer, Battalion Landing Team 1st Battalion, 4th Marines, 15th Marine Expeditionary Unit, where he served as mission commander for the recapture of the M/V Magellan Star in 2010 from Somali pirates. Clearfield commanded 1st Battalion, 4th Marines until 2011. His later assignments included as an operations officer, Command Element 5th Marine Expeditionary Brigade in Bahrain; Current Operations Group Section Head, Plans, Policies, and Operations, Headquarters Marine Corps; military assistant to the Assistant Secretary of Defense for Asian and Pacific Security Affairs. As a colonel, Clearfield commanded the 15th Marine Expeditionary Unit from 2016 to 2018.

As a brigadier general and a major general, he served as chief of staff of United States Marine Corps Forces Cyberspace Command at Fort Meade, Maryland; deputy commander of Marine Corps Forces Pacific in Hawaii; and senior military advisor to the deputy secretary of defense. As a major general, Clearfield was serving as deputy commander of the United States Marine Corps Forces Central Command (MARCENT) in 2025.

=== MARCENT commander ===
Clearfield was nominated to serve as commander of Marine Corps Forces Central Command (MARCENT) in September 2025, with the grade of lieutenant general. He took command on 1 October 2025. Clearfield was also made the head of the ceasefire monitoring mechanism that had been created under the November 2024 Israel–Lebanon ceasefire agreement. He visited Beirut, Lebanon, shortly after becoming MARCENT commander, amidst the Hezbollah–Israel conflict. While in Beirut, Clearfield formally assumed the role of senior US military representative in Lebanon and head of the ceasefire mechanism.

After the June 2026 Israel–Lebanon ceasefire, Clearfield became the head of the new ceasefire monitoring mechanism.

== Personal life ==
He is married to Erika, and they have six children.

Military offices
Preceded by Christopher McPhillips	Commander of the United States Marine Corps Forces Central Command; 2025–present	Incumbent
