= Joseph Dunford =

United States Marine Corps general (born 1955)

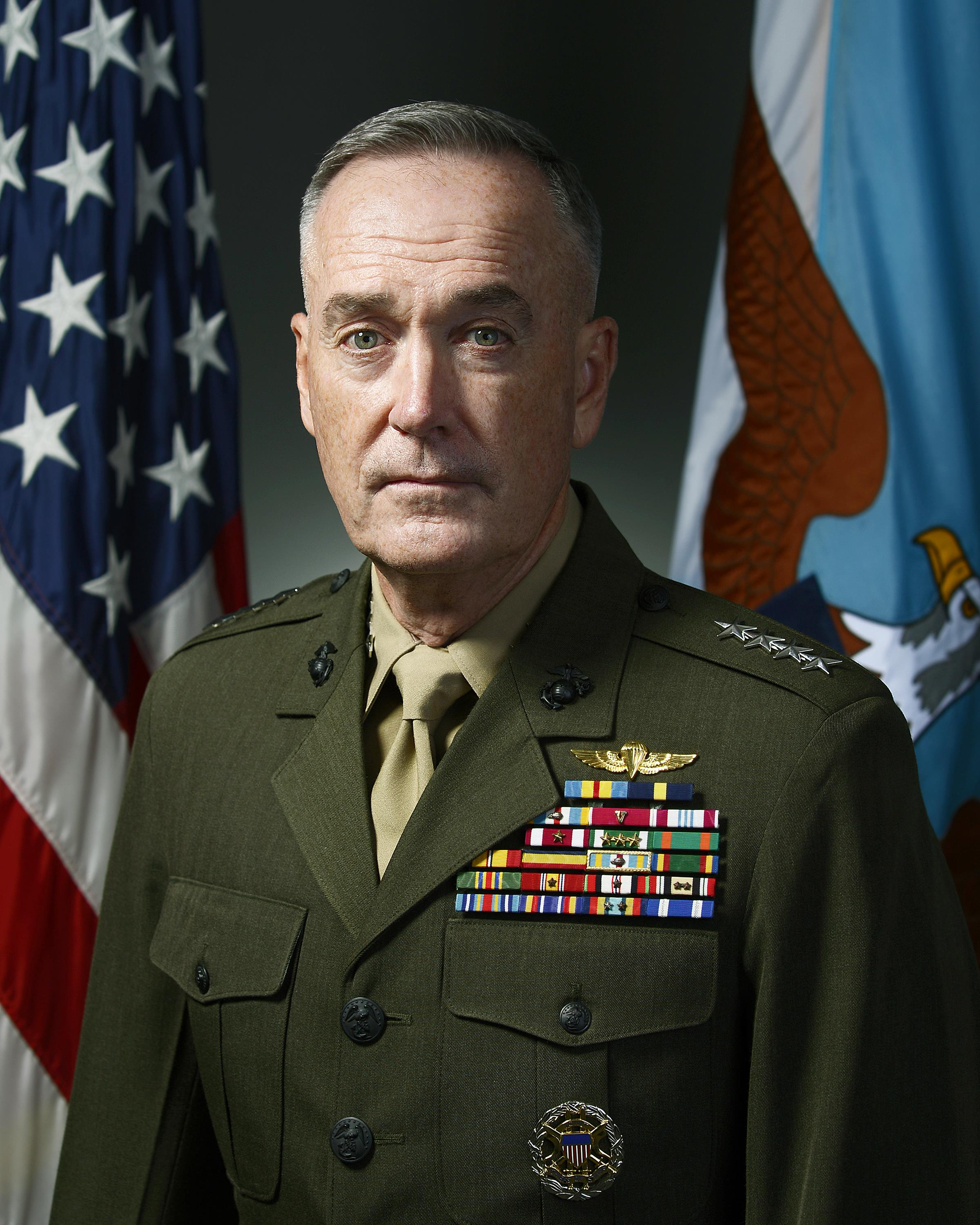
- Official portrait, 2015
- Born: Joseph Francis Dunford Jr. 23 December 1955 (age 70); Boston, Massachusetts, U.S.
- Education: Saint Michael's College (BA); Georgetown University (MA); Tufts University (MA)
- Military career
- Allegiance: United States
- Branch: United States Marine Corps
- Service years: 1977–2019
- Rank: General
- Nickname: "Fighting Joe"
- Commands: Chairman of the Joint Chiefs of Staff; Commandant of the Marine Corps; International Security Assistance Force; U.S. Forces Afghanistan; Assistant Commandant of the Marine Corps; 2nd Battalion, 6th Marines; 5th Marine Regiment; I Marine Expeditionary Force; Marine Forces Central Command
- Conflicts: Iraq War; War in Afghanistan
- Awards: Defense Distinguished Service Medal; Navy Distinguished Service Medal; Defense Superior Service Medal (2); Legion of Merit with valor
- Dunford's voice Dunford at a Senate Armed Services Committee hearing on cooperation with Russia regarding Syria. Recorded 30 June 2017

Joseph Francis Dunford Jr. (born 23 December 1955) is the CEO of the Center for Strategic and International Studies and a retired United States Marine Corps general who served as the 19th chairman of the Joint Chiefs of Staff from 1 October 2015 to 30 September 2019. He was the 36th commandant of the Marine Corps. Dunford is the first Marine Corps officer to serve in four different four-star positions; the others include commander of the International Security Assistance Force and United States Forces – Afghanistan from February 2013 to August 2014, and as the thirty-second assistant commandant of the Marine Corps from 23 October 2010 to 15 December 2012. He has commanded several units, including the 5th Marine Regiment during the 2003 invasion of Iraq.

== Early life and education ==
Dunford was born in Boston on 23 December 1955, and raised in Quincy, Massachusetts. His father served as an enlisted Marine in the Korean War. He is an Irish Catholic and Red Sox fan.

He graduated from Boston College High School in 1973, and from Saint Michael's College in June 1977. He earned his commission the month of his college graduation. He is a graduate of the United States Army War College, Ranger School, United States Army Airborne School, and the Amphibious Warfare School. He holds a master of arts degree in government from Georgetown University and a second master of arts degree in international relations from the Fletcher School of Law and Diplomacy at Tufts University.

== Military career ==
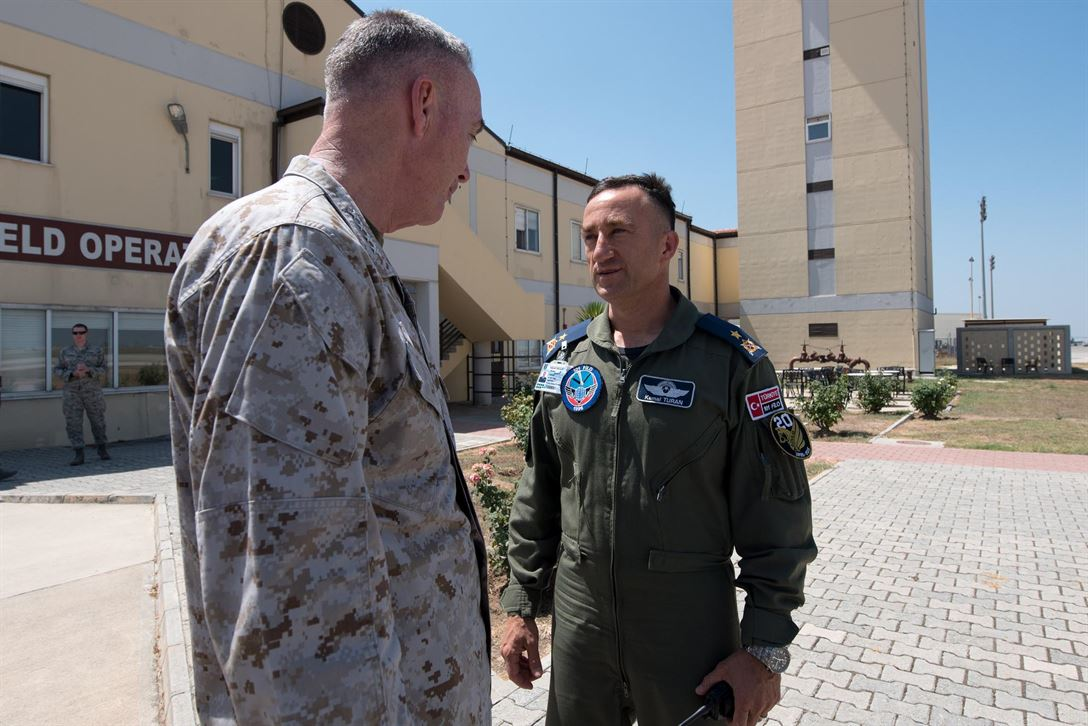
Dunford speaks with 9th Main Jet Base Commander Air Brig. Gen. Kemal Turan before departing Incirlik Air Base, Turkey, 2016.

In 1978, Dunford served in the 1st Marine Division as a platoon and company commander in 3rd Battalion 1st Marines and a company commander in 1st Battalion 9th Marines until 1981. He served as the aide to the commanding general of III Marine Expeditionary Force, Stephen G. Olmstead, for a year, then transferred to the Officer Assignment Branch at Headquarters Marine Corps in Washington, D.C. He reported to the 2nd Marine Division in June 1985 and commanded L Company of 3rd Battalion 6th Marines. In 1987, he was reassigned to 2nd Air Naval Gunfire Liaison Company as the Operations, Plans, and Training Officer.

From 1988 to 1991, Dunford was assigned as the Marine Officer Instructor at the College of the Holy Cross and Officer Candidates School at Marine Corps Base Quantico. In 1992, he was assigned to HQMC as a member of the Commandant's staff group and subsequently as the Senior Aide to the Commandant of the Marine Corps. In 1995, he joined the 6th Marine Regiment as the executive officer, then went on to command 2nd Battalion 6th Marines from 1996 until 1998.

In 1999, Dunford was the Executive Assistant to the Vice Chairman of the Joint Chiefs of Staff (under both Generals Joseph Ralston and Richard Myers) and as Chief, Global and Multilateral Affairs Division (J-5) until 2001. He next served in the 1st Marine Division where he was assigned to command the 5th Marine Regiment, then as the division's chief of staff and assistant commander. During this time, he served 22 months in Iraq. During his command of RCT-5 in the 2003 invasion of Iraq, he earned the nickname "Fighting Joe" under James Mattis.

From 2005 to 2007, Dunford returned to Headquarters Marine Corps to serve as the director of the Operations Division of the Plans, Policies and Operations staff, and eventually became the Vice Director for Operations (J-3) at the Joint Staff in 2008. In December 2007, Dunford was nominated for promotion to the rank of major general. Two months later, Secretary of Defense Robert Gates announced that President George W. Bush had nominated Dunford for promotion to lieutenant general and appointment as Deputy Commandant for Plans, Policies and Operations, to succeed Lieutenant General Richard F. Natonski. In April 2008, his appointment to the permanent rank of major general was confirmed by the United States Senate, and he was simultaneously appointed to the grade of lieutenant general for his new assignment.

On 1 May 2009, the Pentagon announced that President Barack Obama had appointed Dunford to serve as the commanding general of I Marine Expeditionary Force and Marine Forces Central Command.

Less than a year into that assignment, Dunford was nominated by Secretary of Defense Robert Gates to succeed James F. Amos as Assistant Commandant of the Marine Corps, who had been nominated to succeed James Conway as Commandant. President Obama approved his promotion and Dunford assumed the duties and new rank on October 23, 2010.

On 10 October 2012, Dunford was nominated by President Obama to lead U.S. and NATO forces in Afghanistan. Dunford assumed command of the International Security Assistance Force and U.S. Forces Afghanistan (USFOR-A) from General John Allen on February 10, 2013.

On 5 June 2014, Dunford was nominated by President Obama to be the 36th Commandant of the Marine Corps. His nomination was confirmed by the Senate on 23 July 2014, and he became Commandant on 17 October 2014. On 23 January 2015, Dunford released the 36th Commandant's Planning Guidance.

During his tenure, Dunford made appeals to keep sex-based job assignment policies in place to keep women out of ground combat arms military occupational specialties. On 3 December 2015, Dunford was overruled by Secretary of Defense Ash Carter who announced that beginning in January 2016, all military occupations and positions will be open to women, without exception.

=== Chairman of the Joint Chiefs of Staff ===
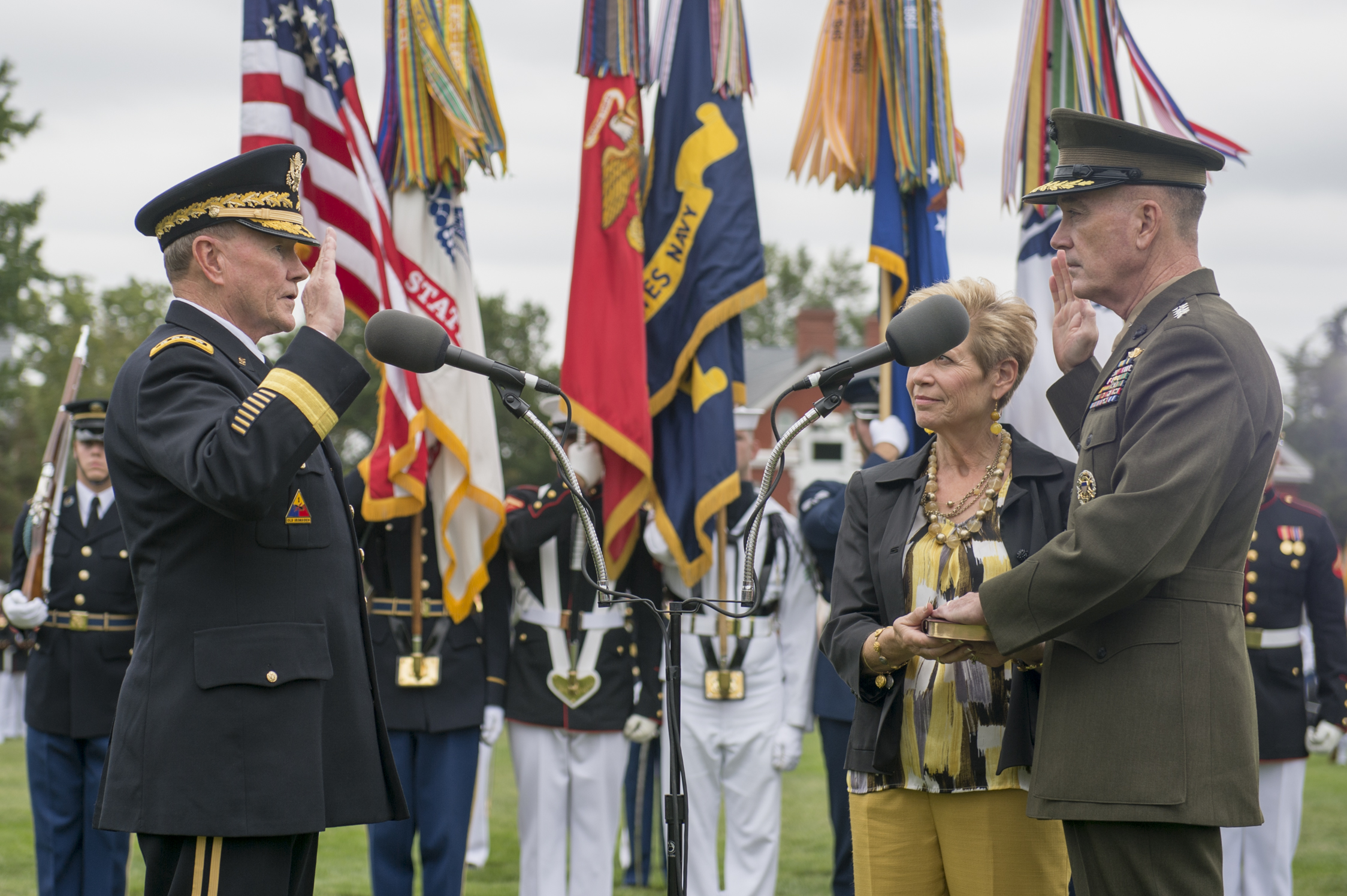
Dunford, right, is sworn in as the 19th chairman of the Joint Chiefs of Staff by outgoing chairman Martin Dempsey, left, in a change of responsibility ceremony at Joint Base Myer-Henderson Hall on 25 September 2015

President Barack Obama nominated Dunford to be the next chairman of the Joint Chiefs of Staff on 5 May 2015. He was confirmed by the U.S. Senate, and took over from Army General Martin Dempsey on 25 September 2015, and officially took office on 1 October 2015. He served with General Paul Selva, USAF, former Commander of U.S. Transportation Command, as Vice Chairman of the Joint Chiefs of Staff. Dunford and Selva served together as Chair and Vice Chair, respectively, from 2015 to 2019. Dunford is the only Marine to have served as Assistant Commandant of the Marine Corps, Commandant of the Marine Corps, and Chairman of the Joint Chiefs of Staff. He was nominated for a second term as chairman by President Donald Trump on 16 May 2017. His renomination was approved by the Senate on 27 September 2017.

During an event in December 2018, Dunford criticized Google for its "inexplicable" continued investing in autocratic, communist-led China while simultaneously not renewing further research and development collaborations with the Pentagon. "I'm not sure that people at Google will enjoy a world order that is informed by the norms and standards of Russia or China," Dunford said. Dunford has urged that Google should work directly with the U.S. government instead of making controversial inroads into China.

Dunford stepped down as chairman of the Joint Chiefs of Staff on 30 September 2019, declining interviews and praising his successor, General Mark A. Milley. Dunford and Secretary of Defense Jim Mattis had favored Air Force chief of staff General David L. Goldfein as Dunford's successor, but Milley was selected by President Donald Trump instead. Dunford officially retired on 1 November 2019.

== Effective dates of promotion ==
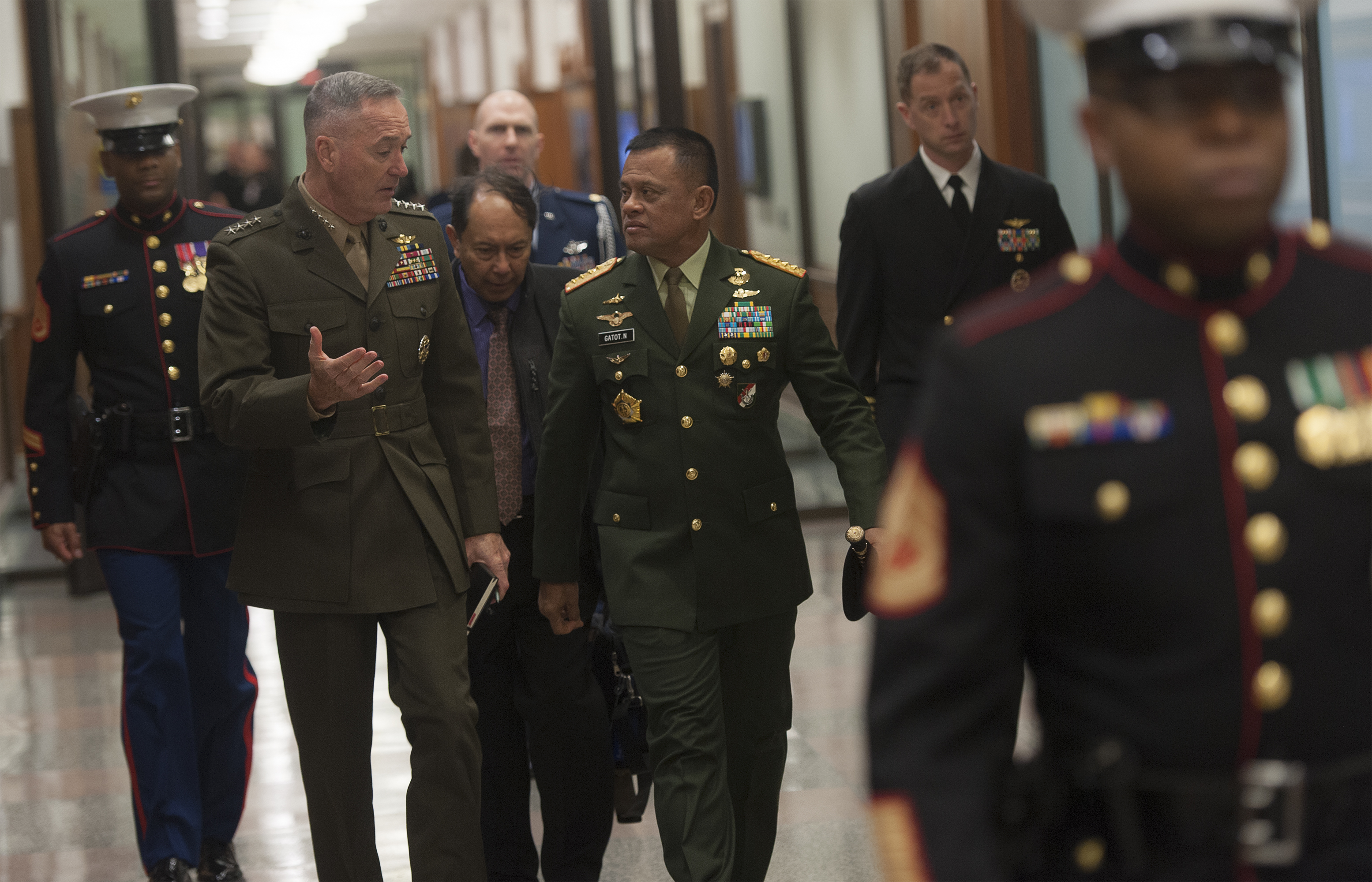
Chairman of the Joint Chiefs of Staff Gen. Joseph Dunford, meets with Gen. Gatot Nurmantyo, Commander-in-Chief, Indonesian National Armed Forces, at the Pentagon, 18 February 2016

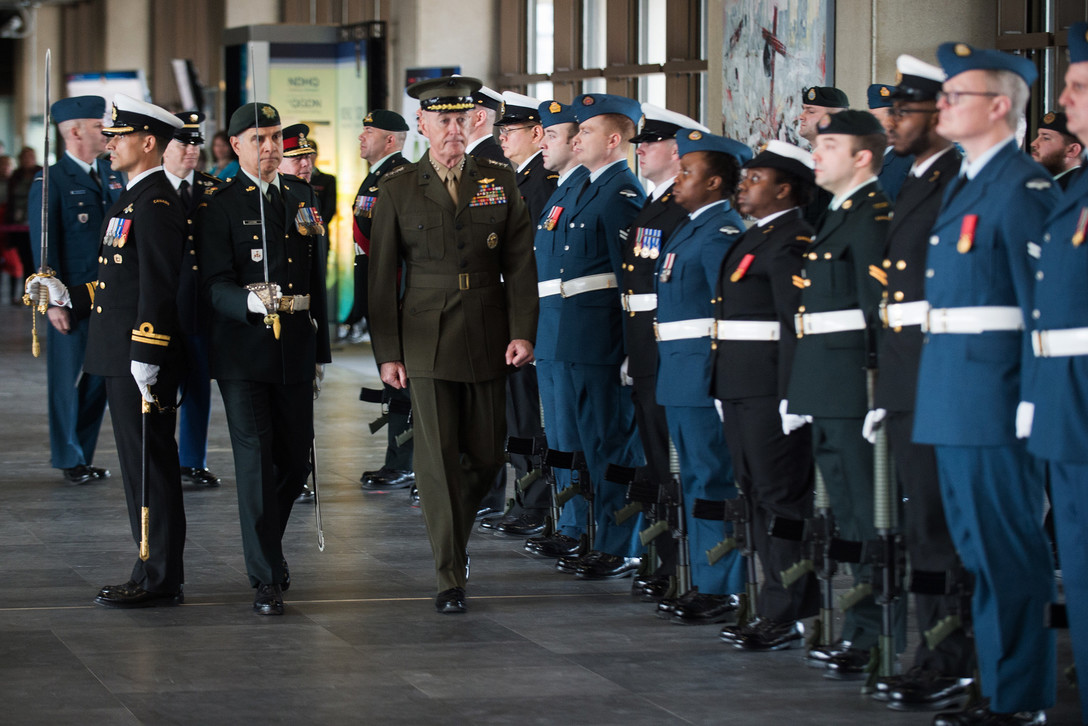
Dunford inspecting members of the Ceremonial Guard during a visit to Ottawa, February 2018

Promotions
Insignia	Rank	Date
	Second Lieutenant	8 June 1977
	First Lieutenant	8 June 1979
	Captain	1 February 1982
	Major	1 July 1989
	Lieutenant Colonel	1 September 1994
	Colonel	1 October 1999
	Brigadier General	1 January 2005
	Major General	8 August 2008*
	Lieutenant General	8 August 2008*
	General	23 October 2010

* Appointed to Lieutenant General and confirmed by the United States Senate in April 2008. Simultaneously, he was appointed Deputy Commandant for Plans, Policies and Operations, skipping the rank of Major General. For administrative purposes, his promotion to permanent major general and lieutenant general are on the same date.

== Awards and decorations ==
Dunford is the recipient of the following awards:

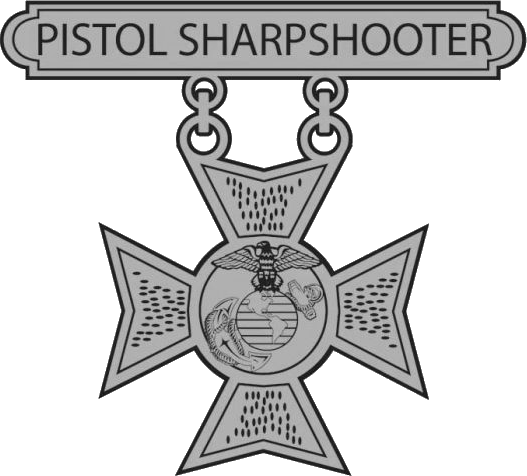

Navy and Marine Corps Parachutist Insignia
Defense Distinguished Service Medal
Navy Distinguished Service Medal	Defense Superior Service Medal w/ 1 bronze oak leaf cluster	Legion of Merit w/ "V" Device	Defense Meritorious Service Medal
Meritorious Service Medal w/ 1 gold award star	Navy and Marine Corps Commendation Medal w/ 3 gold stars	Navy and Marine Corps Achievement Medal	Combat Action Ribbon
Navy and Marine Corps Presidential Unit Citation	Joint Meritorious Unit Award w/ 1 bronze oak leaf cluster	Navy Unit Commendation	Navy Meritorious Unit Commendation
National Defense Service Medal w/ 1 bronze service star	Afghanistan Campaign Medal w/ 1 campaign star	Iraq Campaign Medal w/ 2 campaign stars	Global War on Terrorism Expeditionary Medal
Global War on Terrorism Service Medal	Navy Sea Service Deployment Ribbon w/ 6 service stars (1 silver and 1 bronze)	Order of Merit of the Italian Republic, Grand Officer	Military Medal "Fé en la Causa" (Colombian General Command of the Military Forces, Special Class)
Israeli Defense Forces' Chief of Staff Medal of Appreciation	Singaporean Distinguished Service Order (Military)	French Legion of Honor, Commander	Canadian Meritorious Service Cross, Military Division
Order of Merit of the Federal Republic of Germany, Knight Commander's Cross	Order of Australia, Honorary Officer (Military Division)	Polish Medal of the 100th Anniversary of the establishment of the General Staff of the Polish Armed Forces	Dutch Order of Orange-Nassau, Commander with Swords (Military Division)
Order of the British Empire, Honorary Knight Commander (Military division)	Japanese Order of the Rising Sun, Grand Cordon	NATO Meritorious Service Medal	NATO Medal for ISAF
Rifle Expert marksmanship badge (third award)		Pistol Sharpshooter marksmanship badge	
Office of the Joint Chiefs of Staff Identification Badge

He also earned the U.S. Army Ranger tab.

== Civilian awards ==
On 6 April 2016, Dunford was honored with the Tragedy Assistance Program for Survivors (TAPS) "Honor Guard Gala Military Award", which he received "on Behalf of America's Armed Forces". On 8 September 2016, Dunford received the Heroes Award from nonprofit organization Tuesday's Children at their annual Roots of Resilience Gala. He accepted it on behalf of the men and women of the Armed Forces. On 23 July 2018, Dunford received the coveted "Dwight D. Eisenhower" award during a ceremony from the VFW (Veterans of Foreign Wars). On 10 May 2019, he received the same award from the National Defense Industrial Association. On 7 December 2018, Dunford received the Andrew J. Goodpaster award from the George C. Marshall Foundation.

Dunford was awarded the title of Honorary Officer of the Order of Australia (AO) in the Military Division in 2018. In 2019 he was awarded with the Grand Order of King Petar Krešimir IV of Croatia. He also received Canada's Meritorious Service Cross (MSC) in the Military Division that same year, and accepted the award at the Halifax International Security Forum. In 2020 he was made an Honorary Knight Commander of the Most Excellent Order of the British Empire (KBE) in the Military Division. While, as an honorary knight, he may not use the title of Sir, he retains the right to use post-nominals for any Commonwealth awards.

A street in Quincy Center in Dunford's childhood hometown of Quincy, Massachusetts, was named "General Joseph F. Dunford Drive" in his honor in 2021. Seven general officers from Quincy, including Dunford, were honored with the construction of a public park in Quincy Center, as well as a bridge connecting Quincy Center to the Thomas E. Burgin Parkway. The Generals Park was dedicated in September 2021, and the Generals Bridge opened to traffic in January 2022.

== Civilian career ==
As of 10 February 2020, Dunford joined the board of directors at Lockheed Martin, serving on the Classified Business and Security Committee and Nominating and Corporate Governance Committee. He is also on the board of a New York private equity firm, following a path taken by other prominent retired 4-star officers, such as David Petraeus (who went to work for the global investment firm KKR) and Ray Odierno (who became a senior advisor at JPMorgan Chase). In May 2022, he joined the board of directors at Satellogic, an Argentine satellite company. Dunford is a member of the board of directors of Georgetown University.

On March 12, 2026, the Center for Strategic and International Studies think tank announced that Dunford was named the next chief executive officer. He succeeded John Hamre on May 7, 2026.

== See also ==
- List of United States Marine Corps four-star generals

Military offices
Preceded by Richard F. Natonski	Deputy Commandant for Plans, Policies and Operations of the United States Marine Corps; 2007–2009	Succeeded by Thomas D. Waldhauser
Preceded by Samuel Helland	Commanding General of the I Marine Expeditionary Force; 2009–2010	Succeeded by Thomas D. Waldhauser
Preceded by Samuel Helland	Commander of the United States Marine Forces Central Command; 2009–2010	Succeeded by Thomas D. Waldhauser
Preceded by James F. Amos	Assistant Commandant of the Marine Corps; 2010–2012	Succeeded by John M. Paxton Jr.
Preceded by John R. Allen	Commander of the International Security Assistance Force; 2013–2014	Succeeded by John Campbell
Preceded by James F. Amos	Commandant of the Marine Corps; 2014–2015	Succeeded by Robert Neller
Preceded by Martin Dempsey	Chairman of the Joint Chiefs of Staff; 2015–2019	Succeeded by Mark Milley
U.S. order of precedence (ceremonial)
Preceded by Martin Dempsey as former Chair of the Joint Chiefs of Staff	Order of precedence of the United States as former Chair of the Joint Chiefs of Staff	Succeeded by Mark Milley as former Chair of the Joint Chiefs of Staff
