= Paul J. Rock =

U.S. Marine Corps general

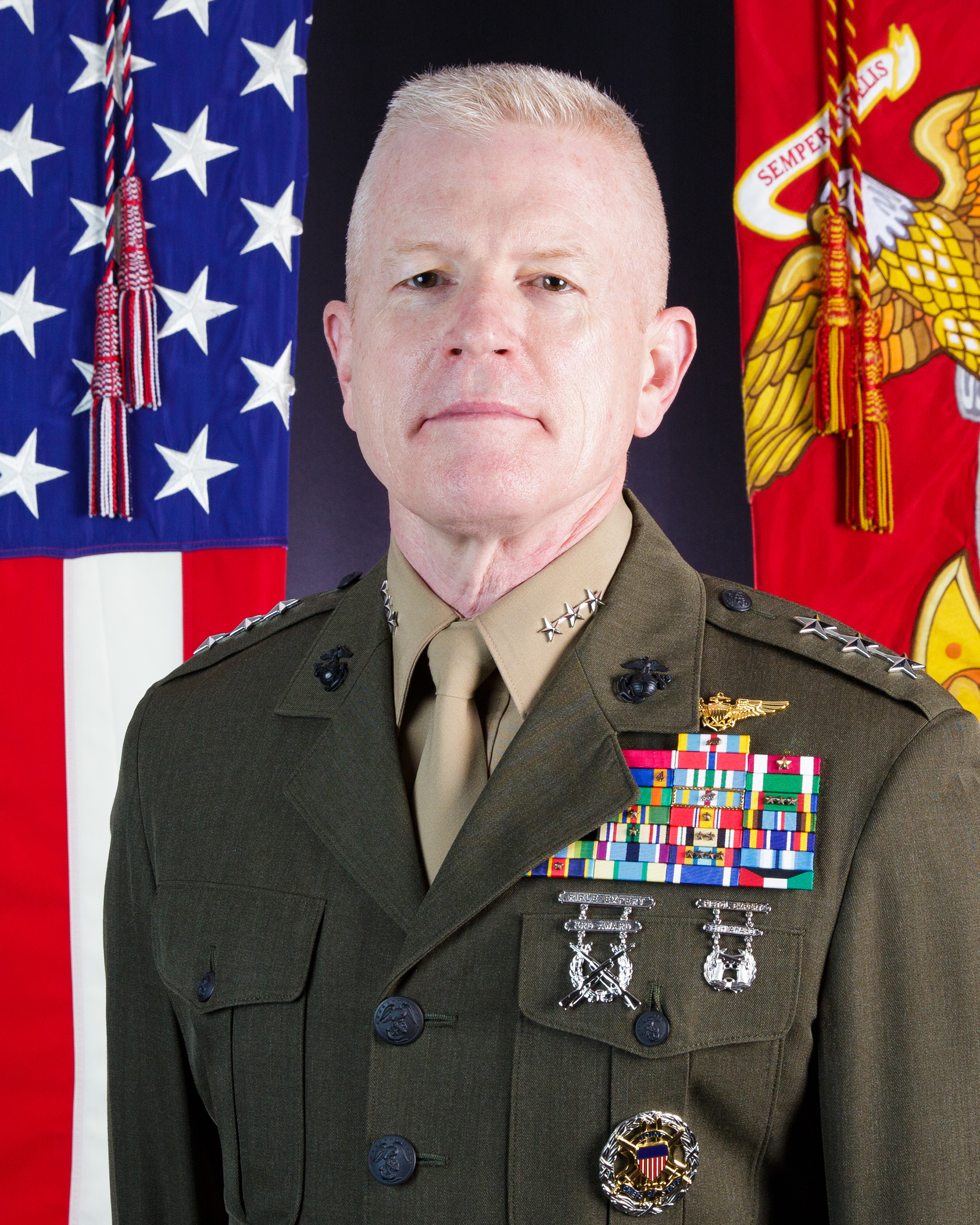
- Official portrait, 2024
- Born: Baltimore, Maryland, U.S.
- Military career
- Allegiance: United States
- Branch: United States Marine Corps
- Service years: 1988–present
- Rank: Lieutenant General
- Commands: National War College; United States Marine Forces Central Command; 3rd Marine Expeditionary Brigade; Marine Corps Installations Pacific; 2nd Marine Aircraft Wing; VMMT-204; VMM-263

Paul Joseph Rock Jr. is a United States Marine Corps lieutenant general who serves as the director of the Marine Corps Staff. He previously served as commandant of the National War College from 2023 to 2024. He also served as commander of United States Marine Forces Central Command. Previously, he served as the Director of Strategy and Plans at HQMC; Deputy Commanding General of the III Marine Expeditionary Force and Commanding General of the 3rd Marine Expeditionary Brigade from 26 July 2019 to 10 July 2020. Rock is a 1988 graduate of the United States Naval Academy. After flight training, he was designated a naval aviator in 1990.

In April 2024, Rock was nominated for promotion to lieutenant general and assignment as the director of the Marine Corps Staff.

Military offices
Preceded by Robert F. Hedelund	Commanding General of the 2nd Marine Aircraft Wing; Acting; 2015	Succeeded by Gary L. Thomas
Preceded by Daniel Fillion	Director of Strategy, Policy, and Plans of the United States Southern Command; 2015–2017	Succeeded by Antonio M. Fletcher
Preceded by Joaquin F. Malavet	Commanding General of Marine Corps Installations Pacific; 2017–2019	Succeeded by William J. Bowers
Preceded by Christopher A. McPhillips	Deputy Commanding General of the III Marine Expeditionary Force and Commanding General of the 3rd Marine Expeditionary Brigade; 2019–2020	Succeeded by Kyle B. Ellison
Preceded by Marcus B. Annibale	Director of Strategy and Plans of the United States Marine Corps; 2020–2021	Succeeded by Sean M. Salene
Preceded by Carl E. Mundy III	Commander of the United States Marine Forces Central Command; 2021–2023	Succeeded by Christopher A. McPhillips
Preceded by Jeffrey H. Hulbert	Commandant of the National War College; 2023–2024	Succeeded by Chase D. Patrick
Preceded by Gregg P. Olson	Director of the Marine Corps Staff; 2024–present	Incumbent
