= Carl Epting Mundy Jr. =

United States Marine Corps general

Carl E. Mundy Jr.
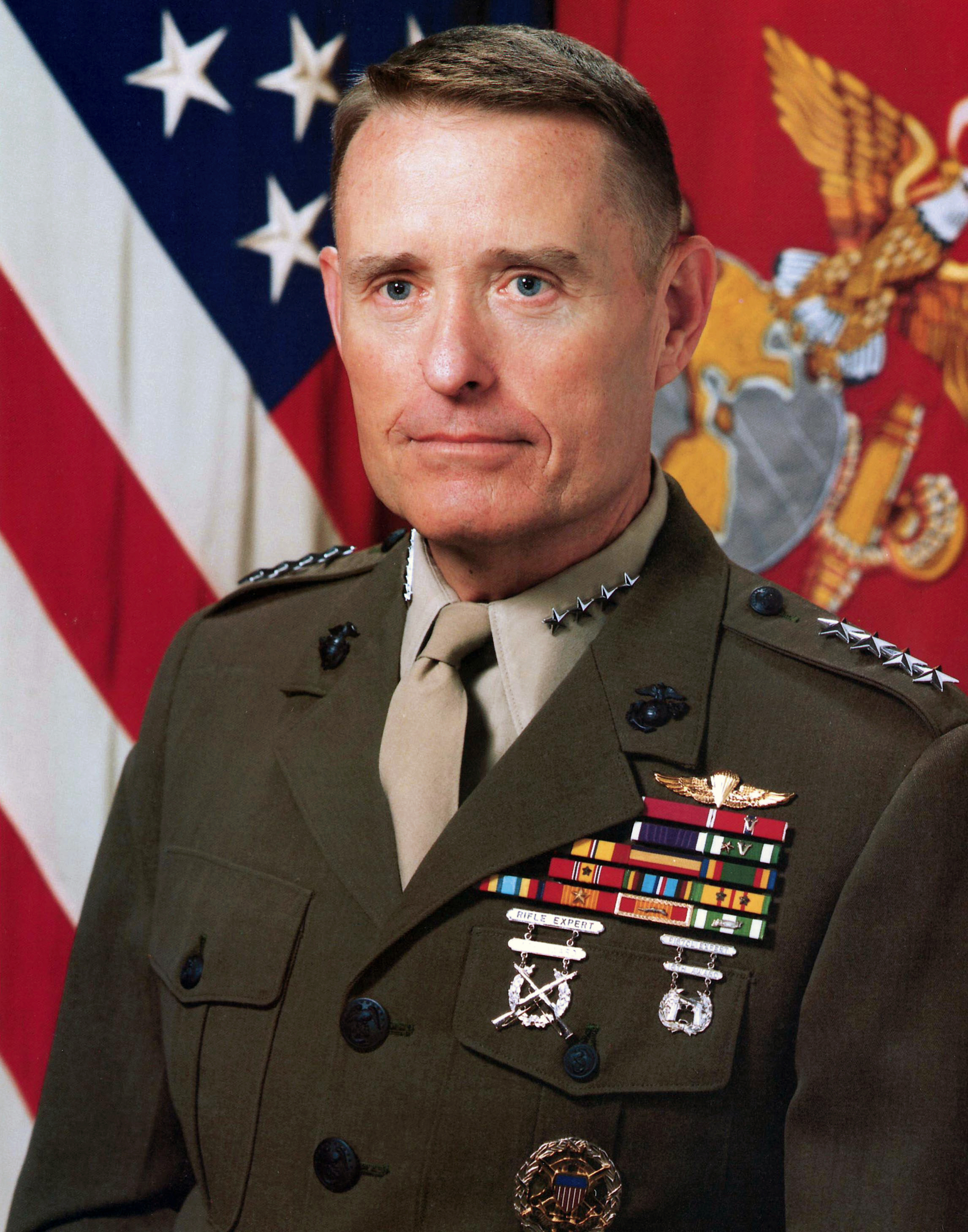
- Official portrait, 1991
- Born: July 16, 1935; Atlanta, Georgia, U.S.
- Died: April 2, 2014 (aged 78); Alexandria, Virginia, U.S.
- Education: Auburn University
- Military career
- Allegiance: United States
- Branch: United States Marine Corps
- Service years: 1953–1995
- Rank: General
- Commands: Commandant of the Marine Corps; Marine Forces Atlantic; II Marine Expeditionary Force; 4th Marine Amphibious Brigade; 2nd Marine Regiment; 2nd Battalion, 4th Marines
- Conflicts: Vietnam War; Cold War
- Awards: Defense Distinguished Service Medal; Navy Distinguished Service Medal; Army Distinguished Service Medal; Air Force Distinguished Service Medal; Coast Guard Distinguished Service Medal; Legion of Merit; Bronze Star Medal; Purple Heart
- Other work: USO; Marine Corps University Foundation; Schering-Plough; General Dynamics; Council on Foreign Relations

Carl Epting Mundy Jr. (July 16, 1935 – April 2, 2014) was a United States Marine Corps four-star general who served as the 30th Commandant of the Marine Corps and a member of the Joint Chiefs of Staff from July 1, 1991, until his retirement on June 30, 1995, after 42 years of service. He was notable for his opposition to military service by gay people and for helping to shape the military's "don't ask, don't tell" policy of 1993.

From 1996 to 2000, Mundy served as president and CEO of the United Service Organizations. He was also the chairman of the Marine Corps University Foundation, and served on a number of corporate boards.

== Early life and education ==
Mundy was born on July 16, 1935, in Atlanta, Georgia. His family moved frequently when he was a young child, settling in Waynesville, North Carolina, when Mundy was about 10 years old. He graduated from Sidney Lanier High School in Montgomery, Alabama. At age 18, he enlisted in the U.S. Marine Corps Reserve.

== Marine career ==
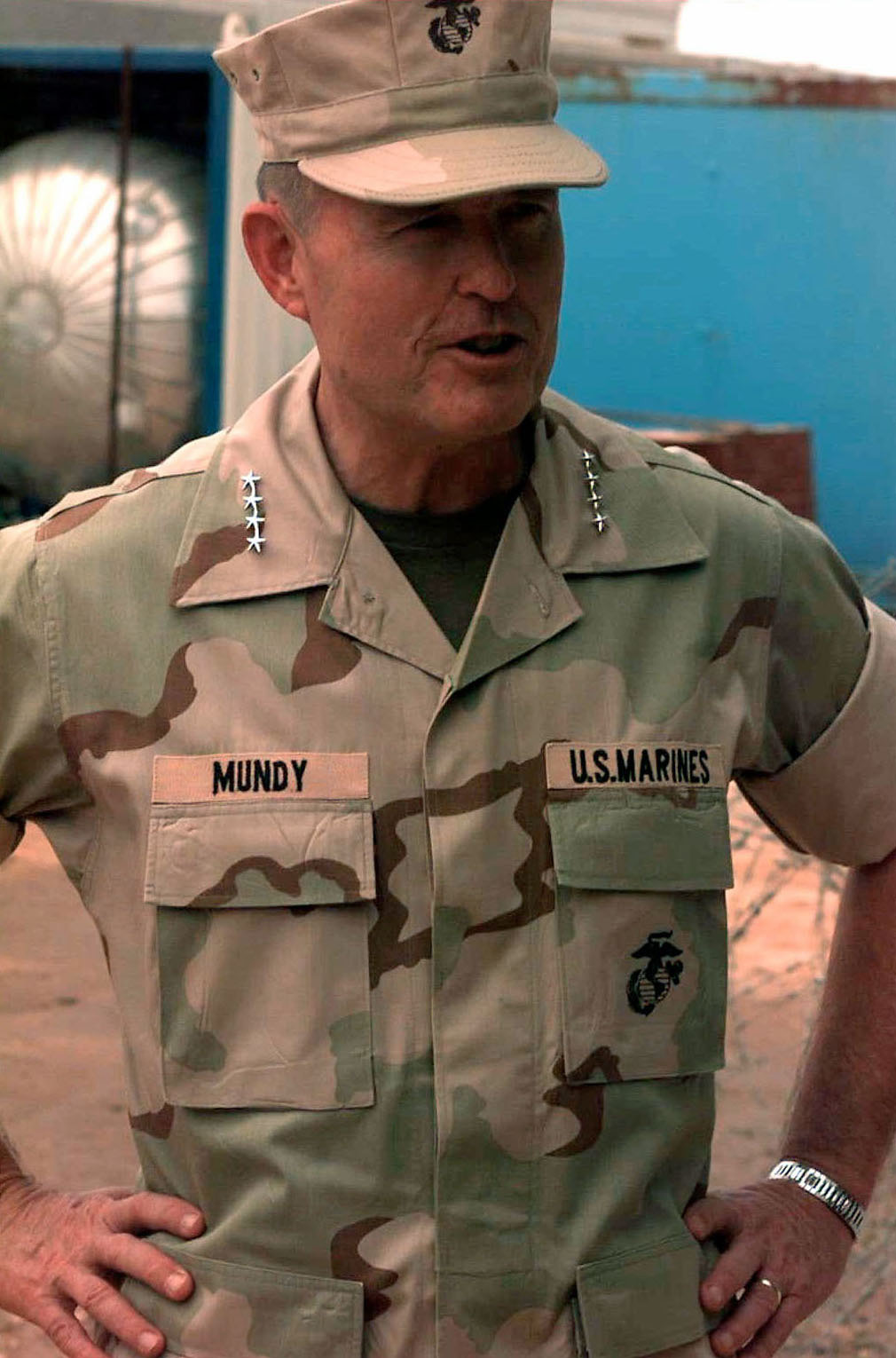
Mundy visiting Marines in Somalia that are assigned to the mission of Operation Restore Hope

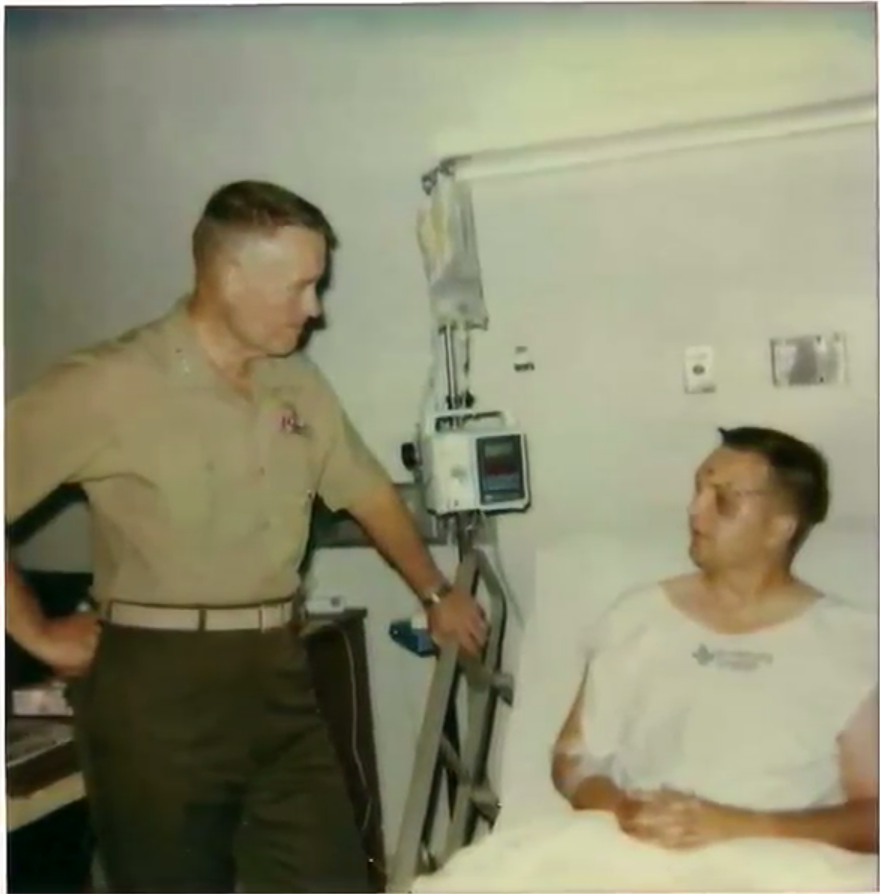
Mundy visiting a survivor of the Oklahoma City bombing in 1995.

Mundy enlisted in the Marine Corps Reserve and enrolled in the Platoon Leaders Class Program in December 1953 while attending college – serving in the 38th Special Infantry Company, Montgomery, Alabama, and rising to the rank of sergeant. He was commissioned a second lieutenant in June 1957, following graduation from Auburn University. His later military education included the Command and General Staff College and the Naval War College.

Mundy's early assignments included service in the 2nd Marine Regiment, 2nd Marine Division; duty aboard the aircraft carrier USS Tarawa (CV-40) and the cruiser USS Little Rock (CLG-4); instructor at The Basic School; and as Officer Selection Officer, Raleigh, North Carolina. In 1966–67, Mundy served in Vietnam as operations and executive officer of the 3rd Battalion, 26th Marines, 3rd Marine Division, and as an intelligence officer in the Headquarters, III Marine Amphibious Force.

After the Vietnam War, Mundy's principal assignments were:

- Aide de Camp to the Assistant Commandant of the Marine Corps
- Inspector & Instructor, 4th Air-Naval Gunfire Liaison Company, Miami, Florida
- Commanding Officer, 2nd Battalion, 4th Marines, 3rd Marine Division.
- Plans Officer, Headquarters Marine Corps
- Assistant Chief of Staff for Intelligence, 2nd Marine Division
- Chief of Staff, Sixth Marine Amphibious Brigade
- Commanding Officer, 2nd Marine Regiment, 2nd Marine Division from 27 March 1981 - 30 April 1982 and 36th and 38th Marine Amphibious Units.

Following advancement to brigadier general in April 1982, Mundy's assignments were:

- Director of Personnel Procurement, Headquarters Marine Corps
- Commanding General, Landing Force Training Command, United States Atlantic Fleet, and Commanding General, 4th Marine Amphibious Brigade. In late February and early March 1986, 2nd/4th Marines deployed to Nordland and Troms counties of Norway, near Evenes and Brøstadbotn, as the main US ski-mobile maneuver element of the 4th Marine Amphibious Brigade commanded by then Brigadier General Carl E. Mundy Jr., taking a leading role in the multi-national NATO winter exercise, "Anchor Express". The wintry, subfreezing weather, unprecedented level of snow, and the rugged terrain in the operating area of "Anchor Express" astride Salangenfjord, Faksfjorden and Lavangenfjord tested 2/4's ski-borne Marines to their limits. Such was the deep snow, extremely steep mountains in fjord country and gusty subzero winds that on 5 March 1986, a devastating avalanche in Vassdalen, Nordland, struck 31 fellow-Norwegian soldiers, killing sixteen engineers from the elite Norwegian Army unit Brigade North, many of whose soldiers operating with 2/4 during the exercise. The Vassdalen avalanche was Norway's worst disaster involving the military since the German invasion of Norway (1940). As a result, Norway went into mourning and the force-on-force exercise prematurely ended.
- Advanced to Major General in April 1986
- Director of Operations, Plans, Policies and Operations Department, Headquarters Marine Corps
- Advanced to Lieutenant General in March 1988
- Deputy Chief of Staff for Plans, Policies and Operations, Headquarters Marine Corps; Operations Deputy to the Joint Chiefs of Staff
- Commanding General of the Fleet Marine Force, Atlantic, the II Marine Expeditionary Force, the Allied Command Atlantic Marine Striking Force, and designated to command Fleet Marine Forces which might be employed in Europe
- Promoted to General on July 1, 1991
- Commandant of the Marine Corps from July 1, 1991, to June 30, 1995

=== Remarks on minority officers ===
In an October 31, 1993, segment on the CBS program 60 Minutes on the dearth of minority promotions in the U.S. Marine Corps, General Mundy was quoted as saying, "In the military skills, we find that the minority officers do not shoot as well as the non-minorities. They don't swim as well. And when you give them a compass and send them across the terrain at night in a land navigation exercise, they don't do as well at that sort of thing." Mundy, noted for being blunt, though possibly the "victim of selective editing", apologized for "any offense that may have been taken" from his remarks. According to The Times, the general elaborated on this question at a 1993 commemoration of the Battle of Iwo Jima, when commenting on Ira Hayes, he said "Were Ira Hayes here today ... I would tell him that although my words on another occasion have given the impression that I believe some Marines ... because of their color ... are not as capable as other Marines ... that those were not the thoughts of my mind ... and that they are not the thoughts of my heart.

=== Position on married Marines ===
Mundy issued an order in 1993 to cut down (and eventually eliminate) the recruitment category for married Marines; the order was rescinded following a public outcry.

=== Opposition to gay people serving in the military ===
Mundy was an outspoken opponent of allowing gay people to serve in the military. As a compromise with others who were less strongly opposed, Mundy shaped the "Don't ask, don't tell" (DADT) policy, a 1993 law stating that self-identified homosexuals are not eligible for military service. Mundy distributed copies of The Gay Agenda, a 1992 video asserting that homosexuality is an unnatural sickness, to the other members of the Joint Chiefs of Staff in an effort to persuade them. In a January 1993 meeting with President Clinton and the Joint Chiefs of Staff, Mundy said that those who admit to being gay or who associate with Gay Pride "will have a negative effect" and that it "fractures teamwork." For a person to "proclaim: I'm gay" is the "same as I'm KKK, Nazi, rapist."

Mundy was signatory to an open letter delivered to President Barack Obama and Members of Congress expressing continued support for DADT. The letter said in part, "We believe that imposing this burden on our men and women in uniform would undermine recruiting and retention, impact leadership at all echelons, have adverse effects on the willingness of parents who lend their sons and daughters to military service, and eventually break the All-Volunteer Force." However unlike the 34th commandant, General James T. Conway, Mundy has said that if the restriction were repealed the troops should not be segregated.

== Awards and decorations ==
Mundy's awards include:

Badge	Marine Corps Parachutist badge			
1st Row	Defense Distinguished Service Medal			
2nd Row	Navy Distinguished Service Medal	Army Distinguished Service Medal	Air Force Distinguished Service Medal	Coast Guard Distinguished Service Medal
3rd Row	Defense Superior Service Medal	Legion of Merit w/ valor device & 1 award star	Bronze Star w/ valor device	Purple Heart Medal
4th Row	Meritorious Service Medal	Navy Commendation Medal w/ valor device & 1 award star	Navy Achievement Medal	Combat Action Ribbon w/ 1 award star
5th Row	Navy Presidential Unit Citation	Navy Unit Commendation	National Defense Service Medal w/ 2 service stars	Armed Forces Expeditionary Medal
6th Row	Vietnam Service Medal w/ 2 service stars	Sea Service Ribbon w/ 5 service stars	Vietnamese Cross of Gallantry w/ 1 gold star	Vietnamese Cross of Gallantry Unit Citation
7th Row	French Legion of Honor, Grade of Commander	Argentinian Order of the Liberator General San Martin, Grand Cross	Royal Norwegian Order of Merit, Grand Officer	Netherlands Medal of Merit in silver
8th Row	Vietnam Campaign Medal	Distinguished Service Medal of the Colombian Marine Corps	Spanish White Cross of Naval Merit	Swedish Order of the Polar Star
Badges	Rifle Expert Badge		Pistol Expert Badge	
Badge	Office of the Joint Chiefs of Staff Identification Badge			

- Mundy also held several awards of both the Rifle and Pistol Expert Badges.
- Note: The gold US Navy Parachute Rigger badge was worn unofficially by USMC personnel in place of US Army parachutist badge from 1942 to 1963 before it officially became the Navy and Marine Corps Parachutist insignia on July 12, 1963, per BuPers Notice 1020. Members of the Marine Corps who attended jump school before 1963 were issued the silver Army parachutist badge but may be depicted wearing the gold Navy Parachute Rigger badge as it was common practice during this time period.

== Personal life ==
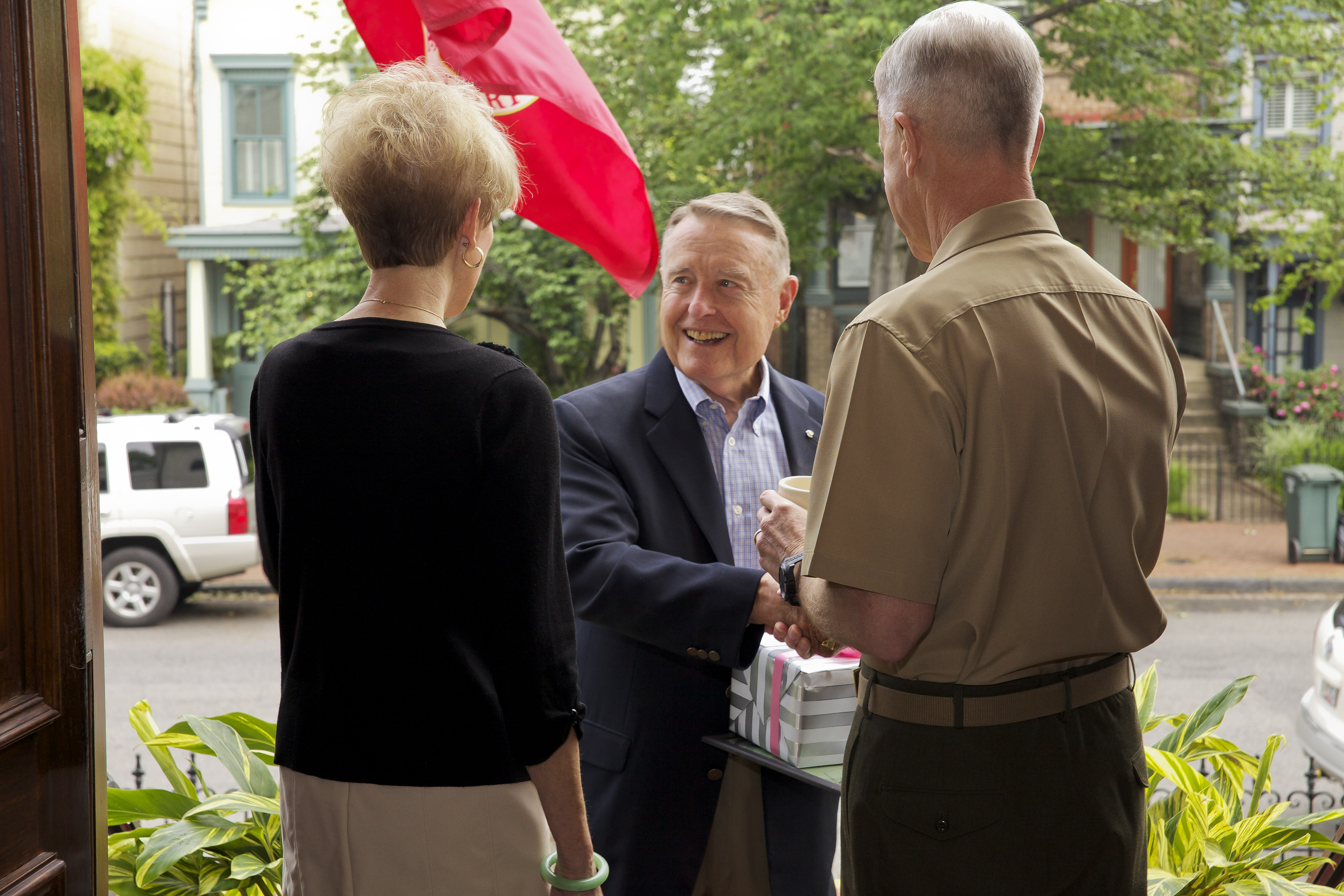
Mundy in May 2013

Mundy was married and had three children – two sons and a daughter. Both sons were United States Marine Corps officers. One, Carl E. Mundy III, is a retired Marine Corps lieutenant general.

== Death ==
Mundy died of Merkel cell carcinoma at his home in Alexandria, Virginia, on April 2, 2014, at the age of 78. A memorial service was held for Mundy on April 12 at the Marine Corps War Memorial in Arlington, Virginia. His funeral and burial service, at First United Methodist Church and Greenhill Cemetery respectively, were held on April 19 in Waynesville, North Carolina.

== Notes ==
Military offices
Preceded by Alfred M. Gray Jr.	Commandant of the Marine Corps; 1991–1995	Succeeded by Charles C. Krulak
