= Director of the Marine Corps Staff =

3rd-senior-most officer of the US Marine Corps

Director of Marine Corps Staff
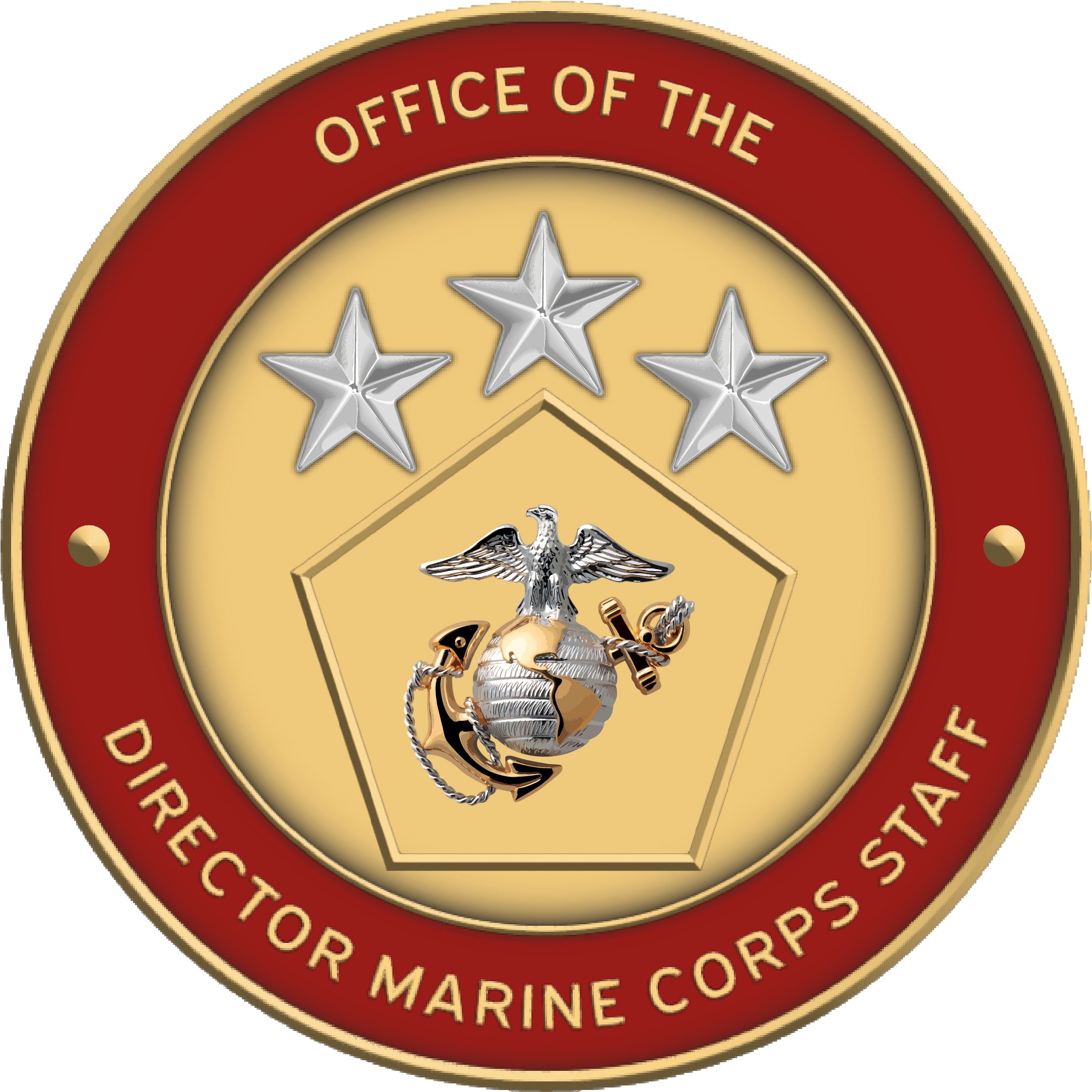
- Director's seal

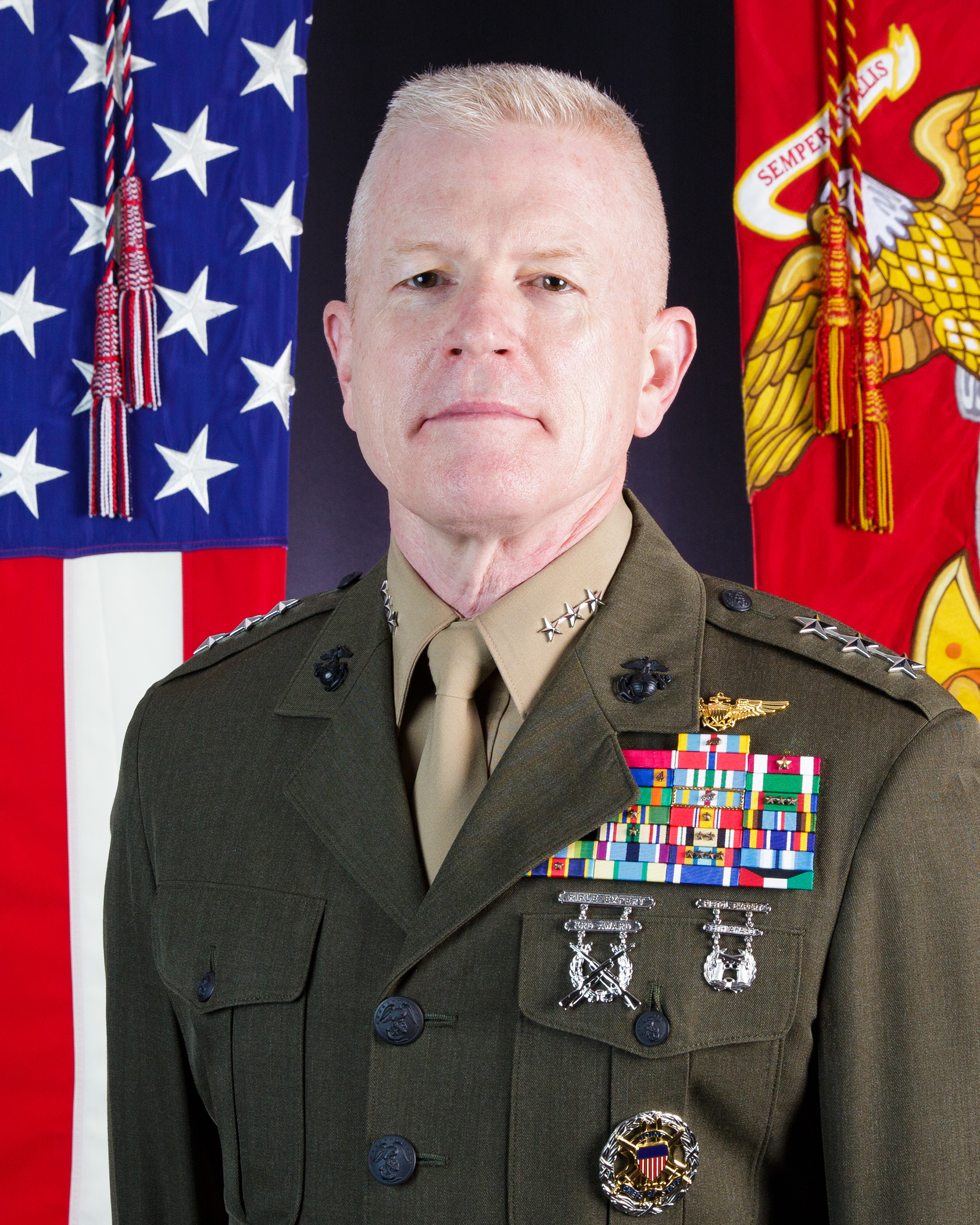
- Incumbent; Lieutenant General Paul J. Rock since September 3, 2024
- United States Marine Corps; Headquarters Marine Corps
- Abbreviation: DMCS
- Reports to: Commandant of the United States Marine Corps
- Residence: Marine Barracks, Washington, D.C.
- Website: Official website

The Director of the Marine Corps Staff (DMCS) is a senior officer position within the United States Marine Corps, serving as the principal assistant and advisor to both the Commandant and Assistant Commandant. The DMCS (pronounced "dimmicks") is responsible for effectively coordinating the staff processes and actions of Headquarters Marine Corps (HQMC), ensuring that the staff operates efficiently and in alignment with the strategic objectives of the Marine Corps.

As of February 2025, the current DMCS is Lieutenant General Paul J. Rock Jr., who assumed the position on September 3, 2024.

== History of the DMCS position ==
The Director of the Marine Corps Staff (DMCS) position was established in the 1990s as part of a reorganization of Marine Corps Headquarters. It evolved from the previous chief of staff role, which had been held by notable officers, including future commandants like LtGen John A. Lejeune and Gen P.X. Kelley. This new position was designed to enhance coordination across Marine Corps staff and improve communication within the Corps' senior leadership.

The creation of the DMCS position responded to the growing complexity of military operations following the Cold War. It was intended to streamline staff processes and ensure efficient management of information and resources at Headquarters Marine Corps. Over time, the role became pivotal for advising the Commandant and Assistant Commandant on strategic staff matters, playing a critical part in the overall operational effectiveness of the Marine Corps.

== Rank and hierarchy ==
Headquarters Marine Corps Structure

The DMCS holds the rank of Lieutenant General (O-9), placing them just below the four-star General (O-10) rank of the Commandant of the Marine Corps. This position is a three-star general role, reflecting its high level of responsibility within the Marine Corps hierarchy.

The DMCS holds significant influence over the operational and administrative functions of the Marine Corps, contributing to the development and implementation of policies and strategies that guide the Corps' mission and objectives.

== Responsibilities ==
In this capacity, the DMCS oversees the coordination of staff activities, ensuring that the various divisions within HQMC operate cohesively. This role involves facilitating communication between different staff sections, managing the flow of information, and advising the Commandant and Assistant Commandant on staff-related matters. The DMCS plays a crucial role in the decision-making process, providing insights and recommendations based on comprehensive staff analyses.
