= Robert Neller =

US Marine Corps general and 37th Commandant of the Marine Corps

Robert B. Neller
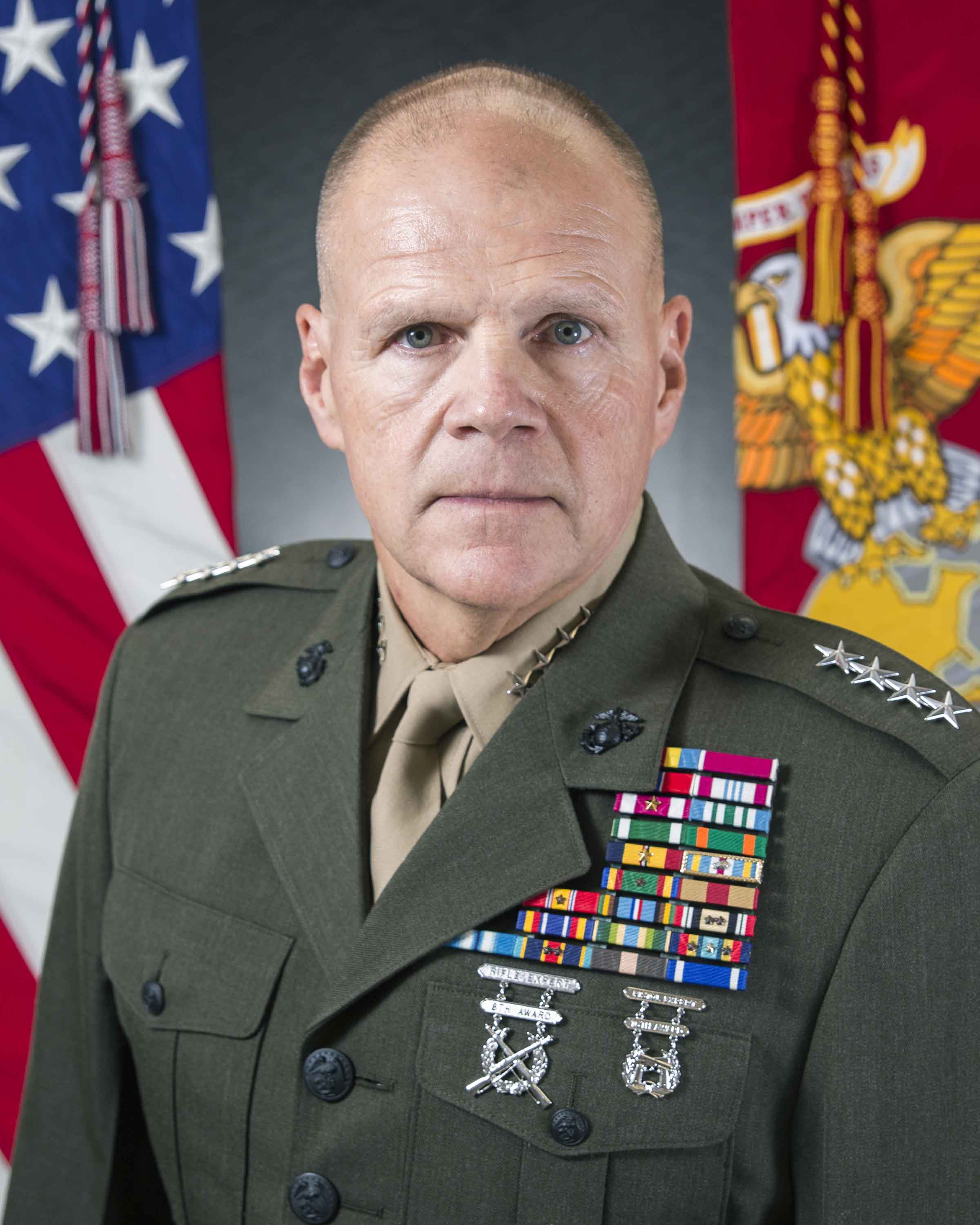
- Official portrait, 2015
- Born: Robert Blake Neller; February 9, 1953 (age 73); Fort Polk, Louisiana, U.S.
- Education: University of Virginia; Pepperdine University
- Military career
- Allegiance: United States
- Branch: United States Marine Corps
- Service years: 1975–2019
- Rank: General
- Commands: Commandant of the Marine Corps; United States Marine Corps Forces Command; United States Marine Corps Forces Central Command; Marine Corps University; 3rd Marine Division; 6th Marine Regiment
- Conflicts: United States invasion of Panama; Operation Restore Hope; Iraq War
- Awards: Defense Distinguished Service Medal; Navy Distinguished Service Medal; Legion of Merit; Bronze Star Medal; Defense Meritorious Service Medal; Meritorious Service Medal (2)

Robert Blake Neller (born February 9, 1953) is a retired American general who served as the 37th commandant of the United States Marine Corps from 2015 to 2019.

Neller was born in Louisiana and was raised in Michigan. He was commissioned in the United States Marine Corps after graduating from the University of Virginia in 1975 and served as an infantry officer. During his career he was deployed to Panama, Somalia, and Iraq. As a general officer he served as the commanding general of the 3rd Marine Division, the Director of Operations on the Joint Staff, the commander of Marine Corps Forces Central Command, and commander of Marine Corps Forces Command as well as commanding general of Fleet Marine Force, Atlantic.

== Early life and education ==
Neller was born in Camp Polk, Louisiana on February 9, 1953. A native of East Lansing, Michigan, he graduated from East Lansing High School in 1971. He enrolled in the University of Virginia and, at graduation, received his commission through Officer Candidates School via the Platoon Leaders Class program in May 1975.

Neller is a graduate of The Basic School, Armor Officer Advanced Course (now the Maneuver Captains Career Course), Marine Corps Command and Staff College, NATO Defense College, and the Armed Forces Staff College. He holds a Bachelor of Arts in History and Speech Communication from the University of Virginia and a Master of Arts in Human Resource Management from Pepperdine University. Neller is a member of Theta Chi fraternity.

== Marine career ==
=== Early career ===
Neller's assignments in the operating forces include: Rifle and Weapons Platoon Commander and Company Commander with Company L, 3rd Battalion, 4th Marines, 3rd Marine Division; Commanding Officer, Company A, 1st Battalion, 1st Marines; Commanding Officer, 3rd Light Armored Infantry Battalion (LAI) and Commanding Officer, 6th Marine Regiment from 10 July 1998 to 6 July 2000. While with 3rd LAI he participated in Operation Restore Hope in Somalia. As the Commanding Officer, Marine Corps Security Force Company, Panama, he participated in Operations Just Cause and Promote Liberty. Additionally, he served as Executive Officer, 7th Marine Regiment, G-3, II Marine Expeditionary Force and G-3, 2nd Marine Division.

Other assignments include recruit series officer, aide-de-camp and as Director of Special Training Division MCRD San Diego, California. Neller served as Student Company Executive Officer and Tactics Instructor at The Basic School, Quantico, Virginia, and in Special Projects Directorate Headquarters Marine Corps. Additionally, he served as a Staff Officer in the Policy Division of the Supreme Headquarters Allied Powers Europe in Casteau, Belgium.

=== General officer ===
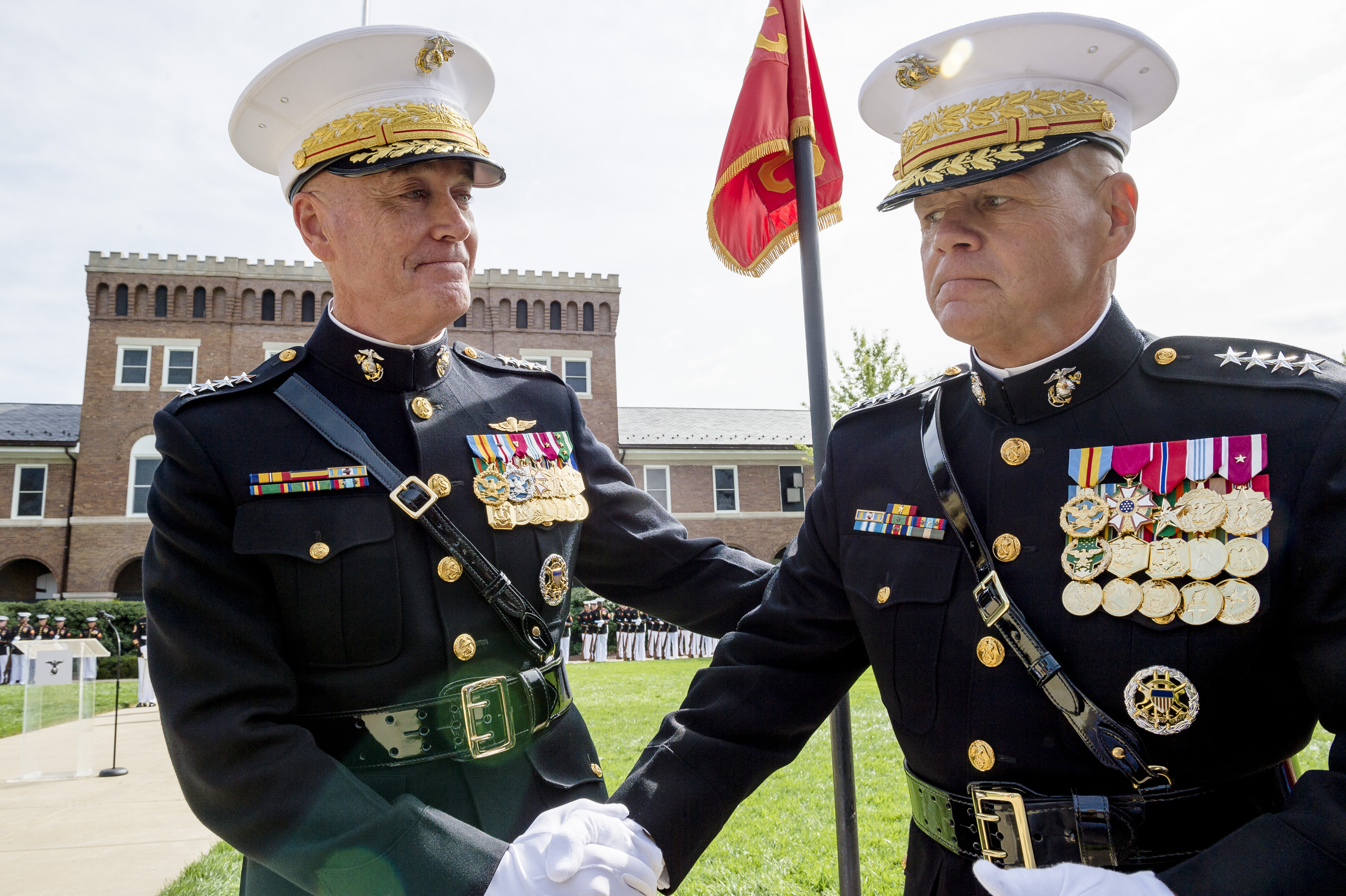
Commandant Joseph Dunford relinquishes command to Neller (right), 2015

As a general officer, Neller has served as the Assistant Division Commander of the 2nd Marine Division and the Director, Operations Division, Plans, Policies and Operations. He was also the Deputy Commanding General (Operations), 1st Marine Expeditionary Force (Forward) during an especially dangerous time of the Iraq War from 2005 to 2007, and as the Assistant Division Commander for 1st Marine Division. Neller commanded 3rd Marine Division and served as President, Marine Corps University. From January 2011 to July 2012, he served as Director for Operations, J3, The Joint Staff, Washington, D.C.

From September 2012 to June 2014 he served as commander, Marine Corps Forces Central Command. In this role he was responsible for the 15,000 Marines that were in the Middle East at the time, in the United States Central Command area of responsibility. Neller was the first dedicated commander of MARCENT to be at its headquarters at MacDill Air Force Base in Florida, as the role was previously held by the commander of I Marine Expeditionary Force at Camp Pendleton, California.

In June 2014 he became the commander of Marine Corps Forces Command in Norfolk, Virginia, where he oversaw the preparation of Marines for operations and deployment, as well as East Coast Marine bases. In that role he was also the head of Marine Corps Forces Europe and Africa.

=== Commandant ===
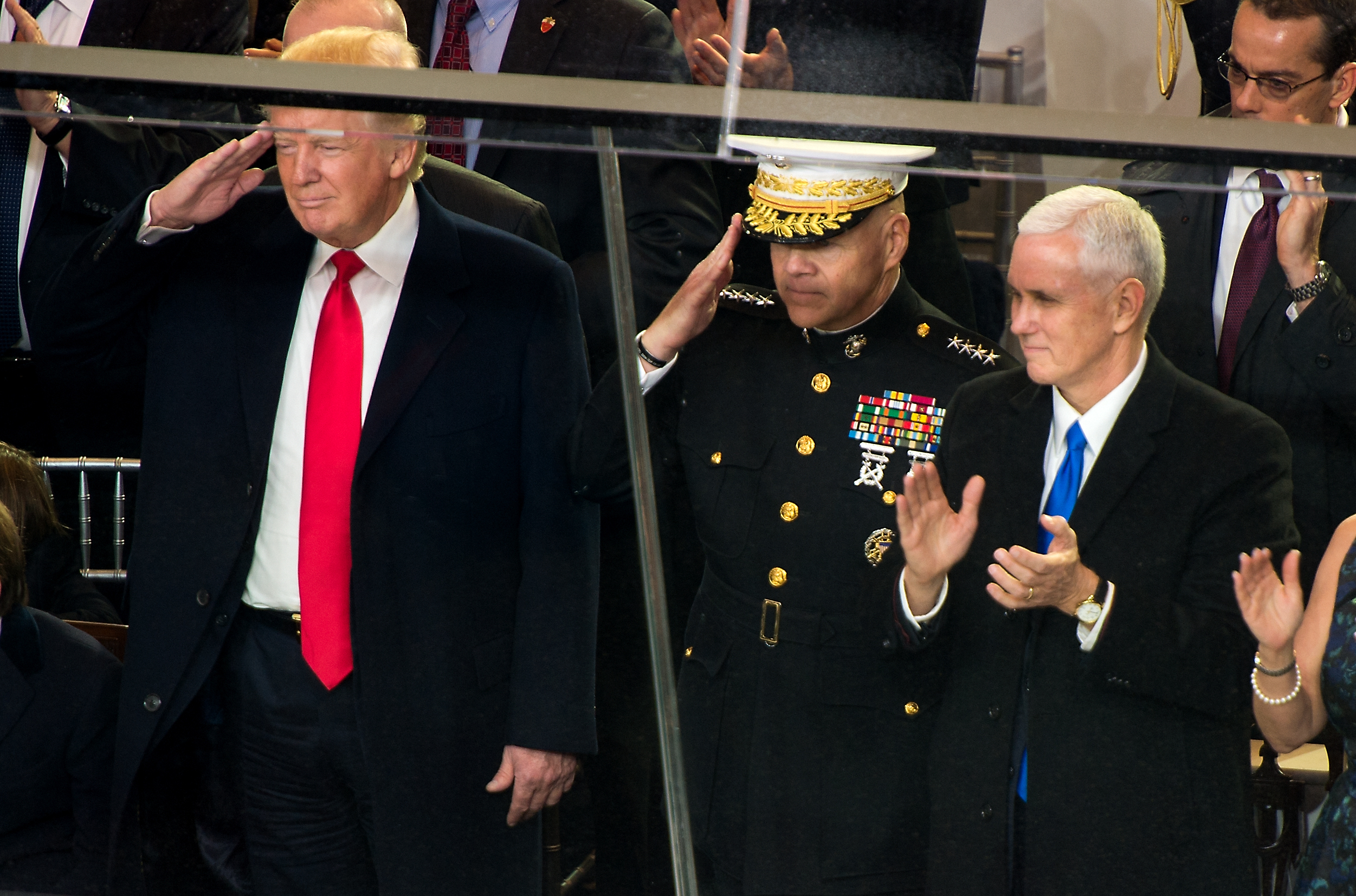
Neller during the inauguration of Donald Trump, 2017

Neller succeeded General Joseph Dunford as the 37th Commandant of the Marine Corps on September 24, 2015. Defense Secretary Ash Carter, who worked with Neller when he had been Director of Operations at the Joint Staff, said that Neller "is a warrior. He is a leader. He is a statesman." Him being chosen over other candidates was considered to be due to his experience of working with the Navy while being the head of Marine Forces Command, as the Marine Corps was considering a new doctrine that is based on a closer partnership with the Navy.

In June 2017, General Neller told Congress that the Marine Corps is "not currently organized, trained and equipped to face a peer adversary in the year 2025."

== After retirement ==
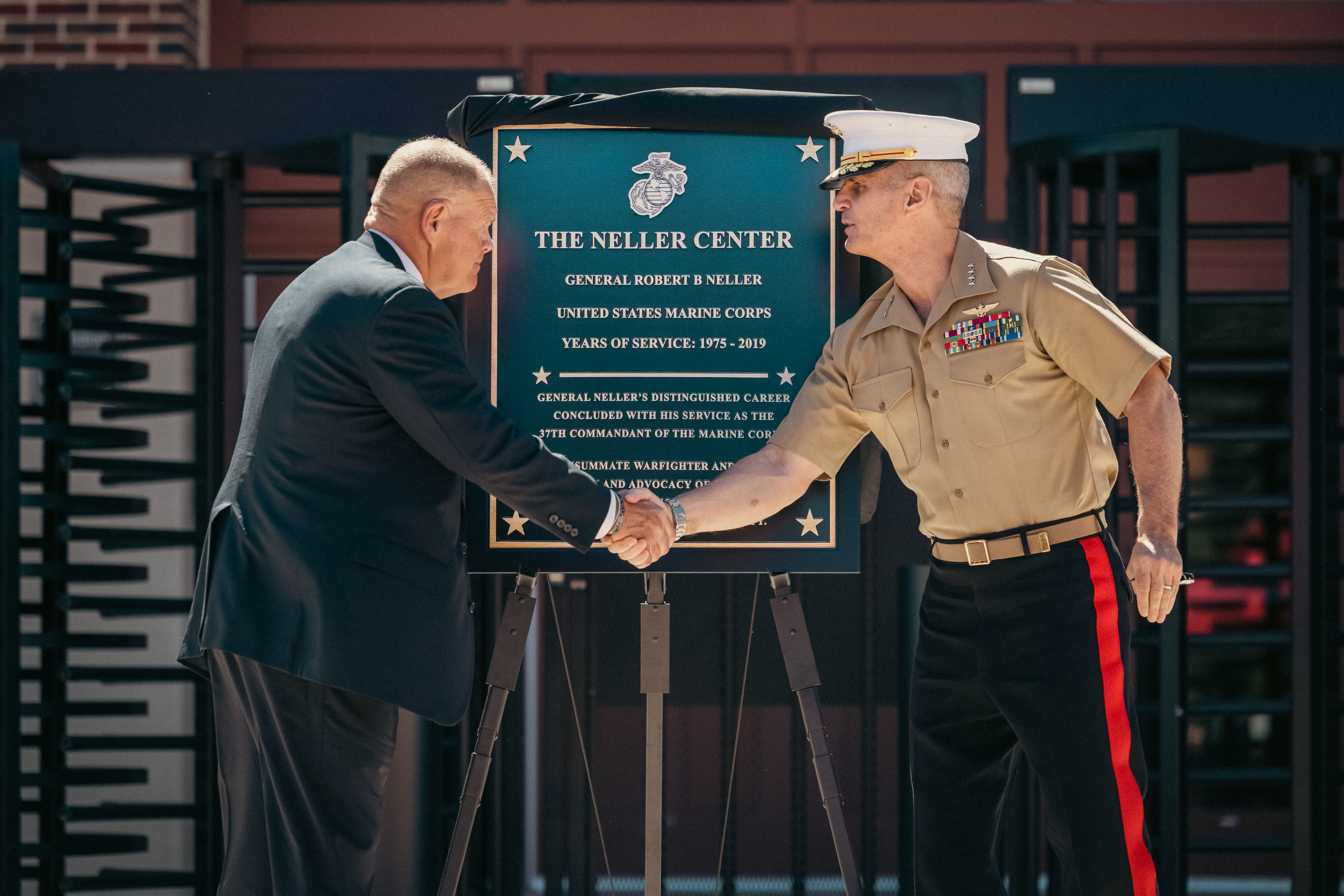
Gen. Robert Neller and Gen. Mahoney, assistant commandant of the Marine Corps, at the dedication ceremony for the General Robert B. Neller Center for Wargaming and Analysis on MCB Quantico, May 31, 2024

On February 12, 2021, Secretary of Defense Lloyd Austin appointed Neller as one of four Departmental representatives to the Commission on the Naming of Items of the Department of Defense that Commemorate the Confederate States of America or Any Person Who Served Voluntarily with the Confederate States of America.

=== Center at Quantico ===
On May 31, 2024, the General Robert B. Neller Center for Wargaming and Analysis, located on MCB Quantico, was dedicated in Neller's honor.

== Awards and decorations ==

1st row	Defense Distinguished Service Medal		Navy Distinguished Service Medal	
2nd row	Legion of Merit	Bronze Star Medal	Defense Meritorious Service Medal	Meritorious Service Medal w/ 1 gold award star
3rd row	Joint Service Commendation Medal	Navy and Marine Corps Commendation Medal	Navy and Marine Corps Achievement Medal	Combat Action Ribbon w/ 1 award star
4th row	Joint Meritorious Unit Award w/ 1 silver oak leaf cluster	Navy Unit Commendation w/ 1 bronze service star	Marine Corps Expeditionary Medal	National Defense Service Medal w/ 1 service star
5th row	Armed Forces Expeditionary Medal	Iraq Campaign Medal w/ 2 service stars	Global War on Terrorism Service Medal	Armed Forces Service Medal
6th row	Navy Sea Service Deployment Ribbon w/ 1 silver and 2 bronze service stars	Navy Arctic Service Ribbon	Navy and Marine Corps Overseas Service Ribbon w/ 2 service stars	Marine Corps Drill Instructor Ribbon
7th row	French National Order of Merit, Commander	Brazilian Order of Naval Merit, Commander	Order of National Security Merit, Tong-il Medal (Republic of Korea)	NATO Medal for Former Yugoslavia
Badges	Rifle Expert Badge (8th Award)		Pistol Expert Badge (16th Award)	
Badge	Office of the Joint Chiefs of Staff Identification Badge			

== Notes ==
Military offices
Preceded by Joseph V. Medina; Acting	Commanding General of the 3rd Marine Division; 2007-2008	Succeeded by James B. Laster
Preceded by ???	President of the Marine Corps University; 2009-2010	Succeeded by ???
Preceded by John M. Paxton Jr.	Director for Operations of the Joint Staff; 2011-2012	Succeeded by Kurt W. Tidd
Preceded by Thomas D. Waldhauser	Commander of the United States Marine Forces Central Command; 2012-2014	Succeeded by Kenneth F. McKenzie Jr.
Preceded by John M. Paxton Jr.	Commander of the United States Marine Corps Forces Command; 2014-2015	Succeeded by Bradford J. Gering
Preceded by Joseph Dunford	Commandant of the Marine Corps; 2015–2019	Succeeded by David H. Berger
