= Christopher McPhillips =

U.S. Marine Corps general

Major General Christopher McPhillips
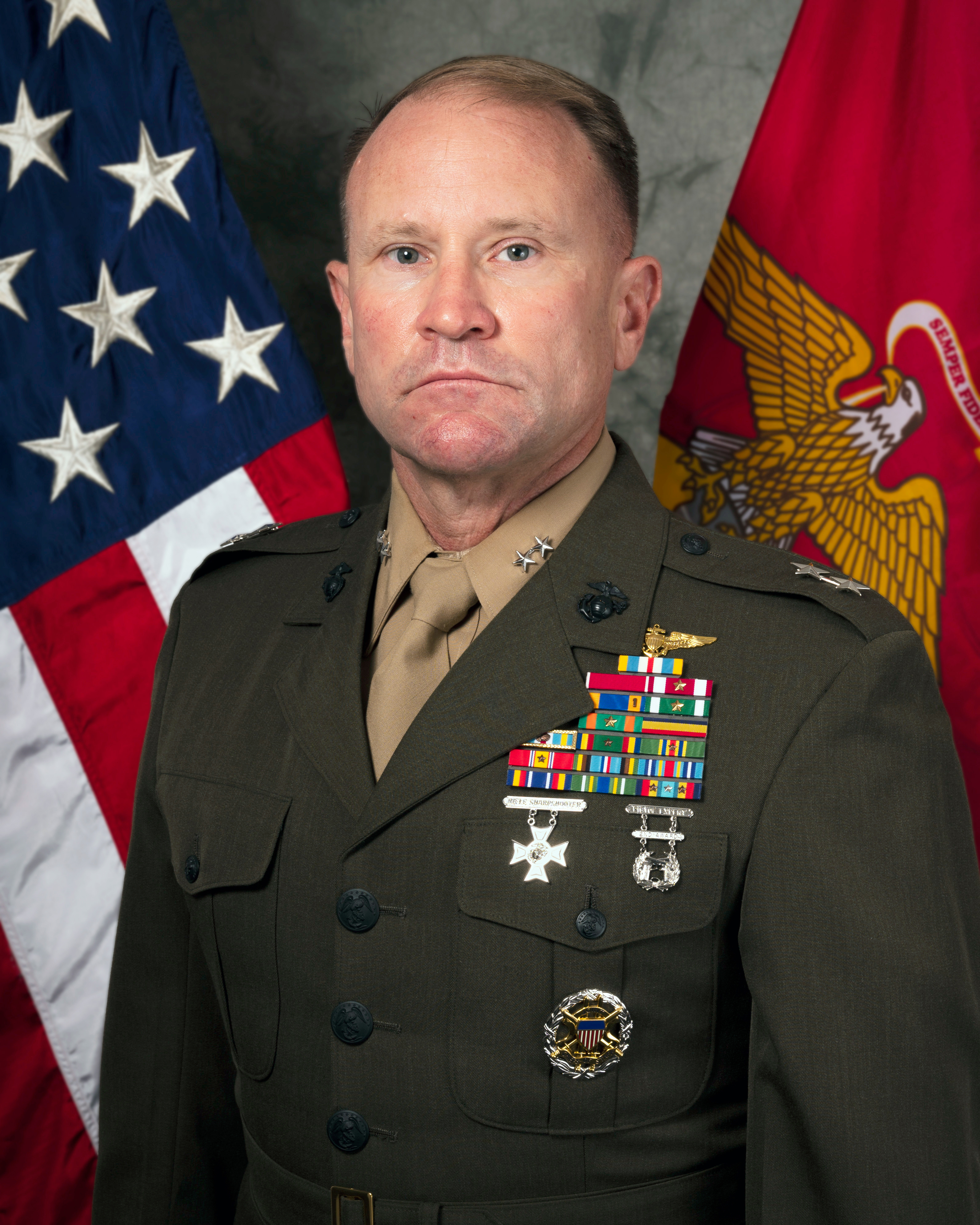
- Official portrait, 2022
- Military career
- Allegiance: United States
- Branch: United States Marine Corps
- Service years: 1990–2025
- Rank: Major General
- Commands: 1st Marine Aircraft Wing; 3rd Marine Expeditionary Brigade; Marine Aircraft Group 13; VMA-214

Christopher A. McPhillips is a retired United States Marine Corps major general who has served as the commander of United States Marine Forces Central Command since August 1, 2023. He most recently served as the Director of Strategic Planning and Policy of the United States Indo-Pacific Command. He previously was the Commander of the 1st Marine Aircraft Wing.

Military offices
Preceded by ???	Assistant Commander of the 1st Marine Aircraft Wing; 2016–2017	Succeeded by ???
Preceded by John M. Jansen	Deputy Commanding General of the III Marine Expeditionary Force and Commanding General of the 3rd Marine Expeditionary Brigade; 2017–2019	Succeeded by Paul J. Rock
Preceded by Thomas Weidley	Commander of the 1st Marine Aircraft Wing; 2019–2021	Succeeded by Brian W. Cavanaugh
Preceded by Stephen Sklenka	Director of Strategic Planning and Policy of the United States Indo-Pacific Command; 2021–2023	Succeeded by Jay M. Bargeron
Preceded by Paul J. Rock	Commander of the United States Marine Forces Central Command; 2023–2025	Succeeded by Joseph R. Clearfield
