= Thomas D. Waldhauser =

United States Marine Corps general (born 1953)

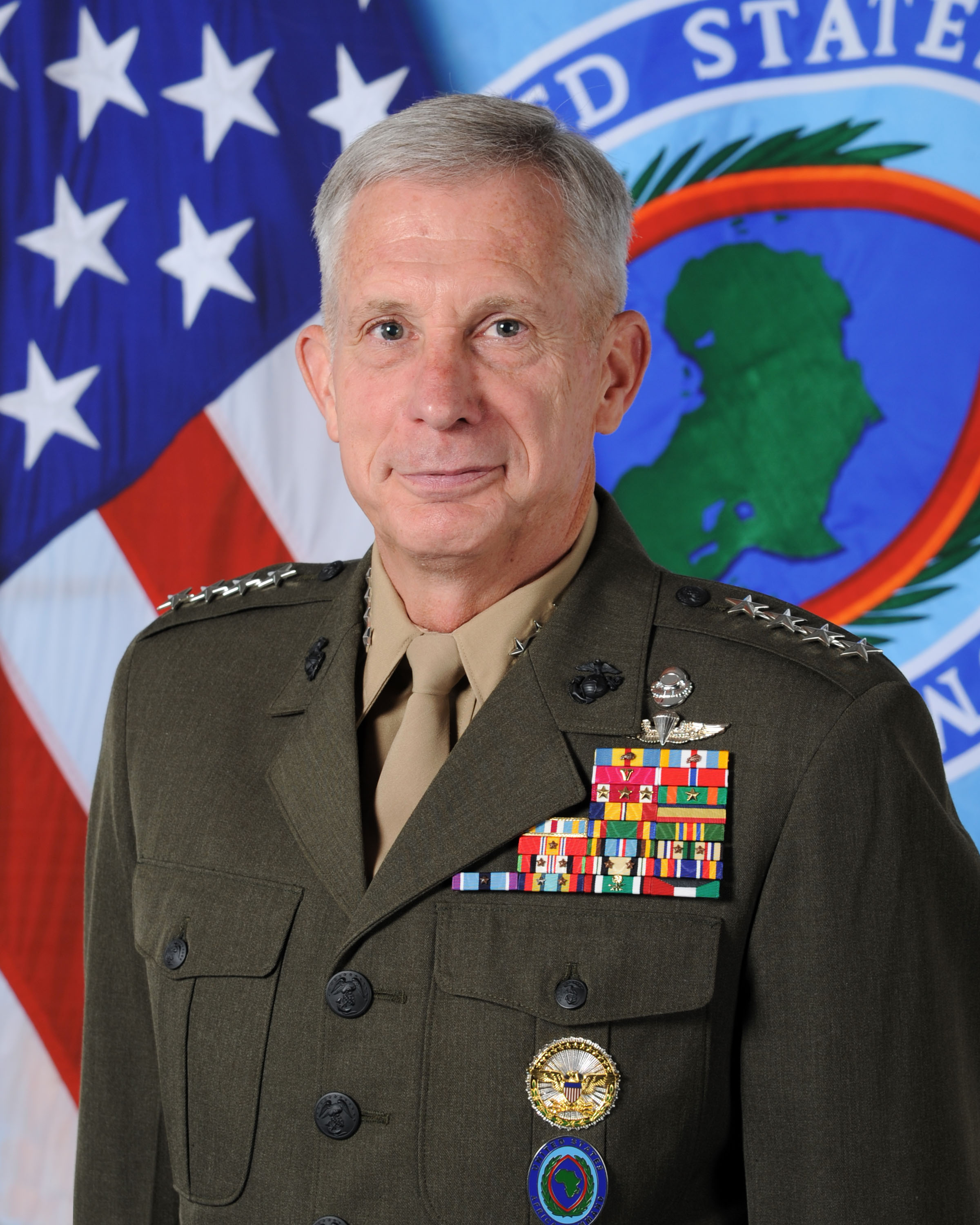
- General Thomas D. Waldhauser in 2016
- Born: 16 December 1953 (age 72); South St. Paul, Minnesota, U.S.
- Military career
- Allegiance: United States
- Branch: United States Marine Corps
- Service years: 1976–2019
- Rank: General
- Commands: United States Africa Command; I Marine Expeditionary Force; United States Marine Forces Central Command; United States Special Operations Command Africa; Marine Corps Warfighting Laboratory; 15th Marine Expeditionary Unit (SOC)
- Conflicts: Gulf War; War in Afghanistan; Iraq War
- Awards: Defense Distinguished Service Medal (3); Defense Superior Service Medal (2); Legion of Merit for Valor; Bronze Star Medal

Thomas David Waldhauser (born 16 December 1953) is a retired United States Marine Corps general who was the Commander of United States Africa Command. He previously served as Director for Joint Force Development, J7 on the Joint Chiefs of Staff, Commanding General, I Marine Expeditionary Force, and Commanding General, United States Marine Forces Central Command. Waldhauser is an alumnus of Bemidji State University.

== Military career ==
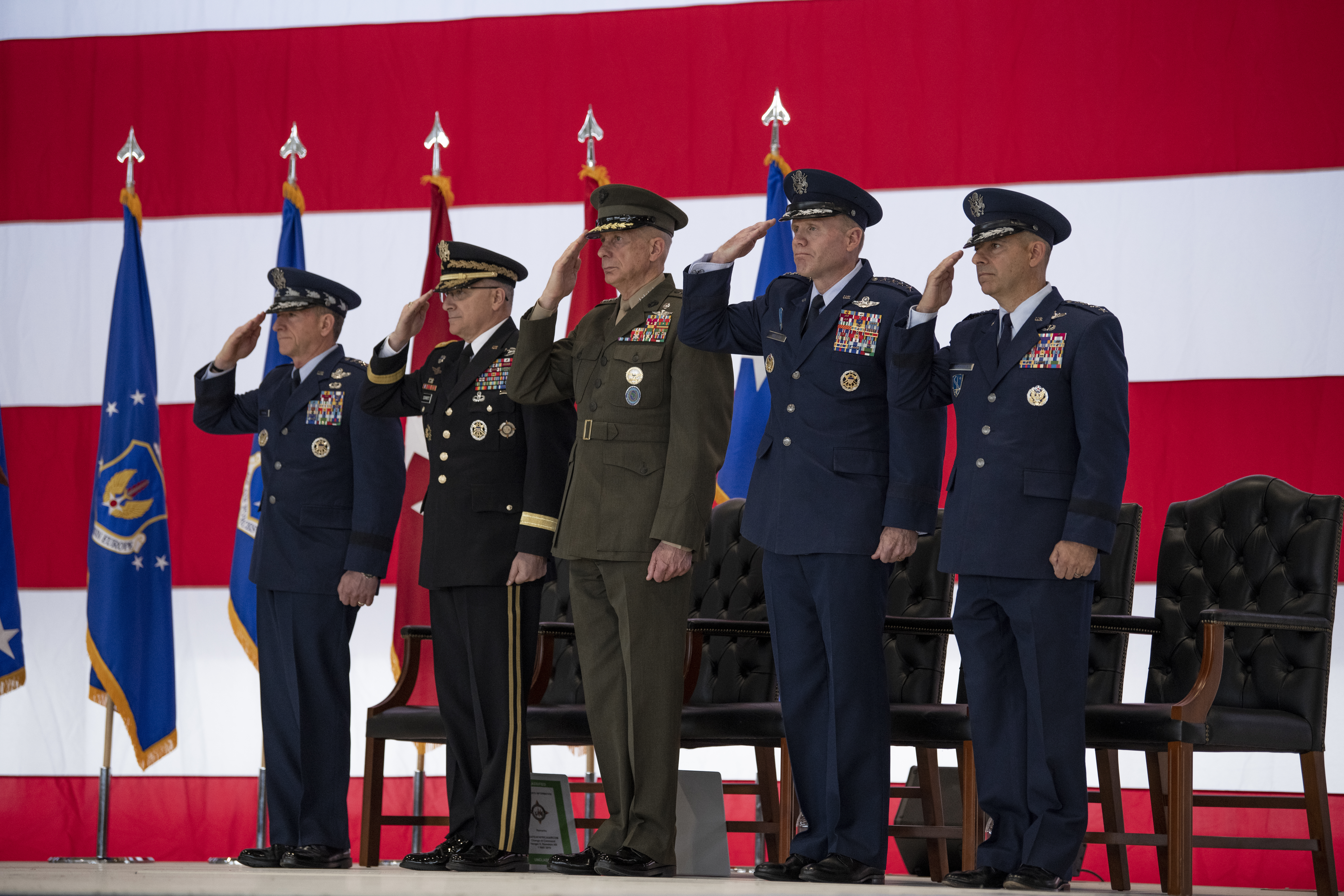
AFRICOM Commander Thomas D. Waldhauser with U.S. Air Force Chief of Staff General David L. Goldfein and Supreme Allied Commander Europe General Tod D. Wolters and USAFE-AFAFRICA Commander General Jeffrey L. Harrigian at Ramstein Air Base, Germany, May 1, 2019.

Waldhauser was born in South St. Paul, Minnesota. He graduated Bemidji State University and the National War College. He was commissioned into the United States Marine Corps in 1976 as an infantry officer through the Platoon Leaders Class program via Officer Candidates School. His company grade assignments included platoon and company commander billets with both the 1st and 2nd Marine Divisions; Commanding Officer of the Marine Detachment aboard the USS Long Beach (CGN-9); and staff of the Commander of Amphibious Squadron Seven.

As a field grade officer, Waldhauser was a Battalion Landing Team Operations Officer and served on the faculty of the Amphibious Warfare School. During the Amphibious Warfare School tour, he deployed to the staff of the Commander, United States Marine Forces Central Command (Forward) during Operation Desert Shield/Desert Storm.

Waldhauser also served on the II Marine Expeditionary Force staff. He was the Battalion Landing Team Commander of 3rd Battalion, 2nd Marine Regiment. He also had duty at Headquarters, United States Marine Corps, and the Pentagon with the Joint Staff Combating Terrorism Directorate (J-34).

As a colonel, Waldhauser assumed command of the 15th Marine Expeditionary Unit (SOC) in 2000. During this tour, the unit participated in combat operations in Southern Afghanistan for Operation Enduring Freedom and in Iraq for Operation Iraqi Freedom.

Appointed to the rank of brigadier general in 2003, Waldhauser's initial assignments as a general Officer were Commanding General, Marine Corps Warfighting Laboratory, and Deputy Commander, Marine Corps Combat Development Command. From 2006–2007, he served as Chief of Staff, United States Special Operations Command, in Tampa, Florida.

As a major general, Waldhauser commanded the First Marine Division from September 2007 until July 2009.

Promoted to lieutenant general in 2009, Waldhauser served as the Deputy Commandant for Plans Policies, and Operations during 2009–2010. From October 2010 through September 2012, he served as the Commanding General, I Marine Expeditionary Force, and Commanding General, United States Marine Forces Central Command. Waldhauser served as the Senior Military Assistant to the Secretary of Defense from October 2012 through September 2013.

Waldhauser was promoted to general on 18 July 2016 and became the commander of United States Africa Command. He retired in 2019.

Waldhauser has attended the United States Army Ranger School, Jumpmaster School, Amphibious Warfare School, and Marine Corps Command and Staff College.

== Post-military activities ==
Since his retirement from the military in 2019, he has held positions on the Board of Governors for the Marine Corps Heritage Foundation, as an Honorary Advisor for Girl Security, and a position as a Fellow at the National Defense University. He serves as a Senior Advisor for Jones Group International as well.

== Awards and decorations ==
Waldhauser's decorations and medals include:

SCUBA Diver Badge
Navy and Marine Corps Parachutist Insignia
Defense Distinguished Service Medal with two bronze oak leaf clusters
Defense Superior Service Medal with oak leaf cluster	Legion of Merit with Combat V	Bronze Star	Meritorious Service Medal with three gold award stars
Navy Achievement Medal with award star	Combat Action Ribbon	Navy Presidential Unit Citation	Joint Meritorious Unit Award
Navy Unit Commendation	Navy Meritorious Unit Commendation	National Defense Service Medal with one bronze service star	Armed Forces Expeditionary Medal
Southwest Asia Service Medal with two service stars	Afghanistan Campaign Medal with two service stars	Iraq Campaign Medal with two service stars	Global War on Terrorism Service Medal
Humanitarian Service Medal with service star	Sea Service Deployment Ribbon with eight service stars	Kuwait Liberation Medal (Saudi Arabia)	Kuwait Liberation Medal (Kuwait)
Office of the Secretary of Defense Identification Badge
Office of the Joint Chiefs of Staff Identification Badge

- He holds Expert Rifle (4th award) and Expert Pistol (4th award) marksmanship badges. He also earned the U.S. Army Ranger tab.

Military offices
Preceded by Richard P. Mills	Commanding General of the 1st Marine Division; 2007-2009	Succeeded by Richard P. Mills
Preceded by Joseph Dunford	Commanding General of the I Marine Expeditionary Force; 2010-2012	Succeeded by John A. Toolan
Preceded by Joseph Dunford	Commander of United States Marine Forces Central Command; 2010-2012	Succeeded by Robert B. Neller
Preceded by John F. Kelly	Senior Military Assistant to the Secretary of Defense; 2012-2013	Succeeded by Robert B. Abrams
Preceded by George J. Flynn	Director for Joint Force Development of the Joint Staff; 2013-2016	Succeeded by Daniel J. O'Donohue
Preceded by David M. Rodriguez	Commander of the United States Africa Command; 2016-2019	Succeeded by Stephen J. Townsend
