= Carl E. Mundy III =

United States Marine Corps general

Carl Epting Mundy III
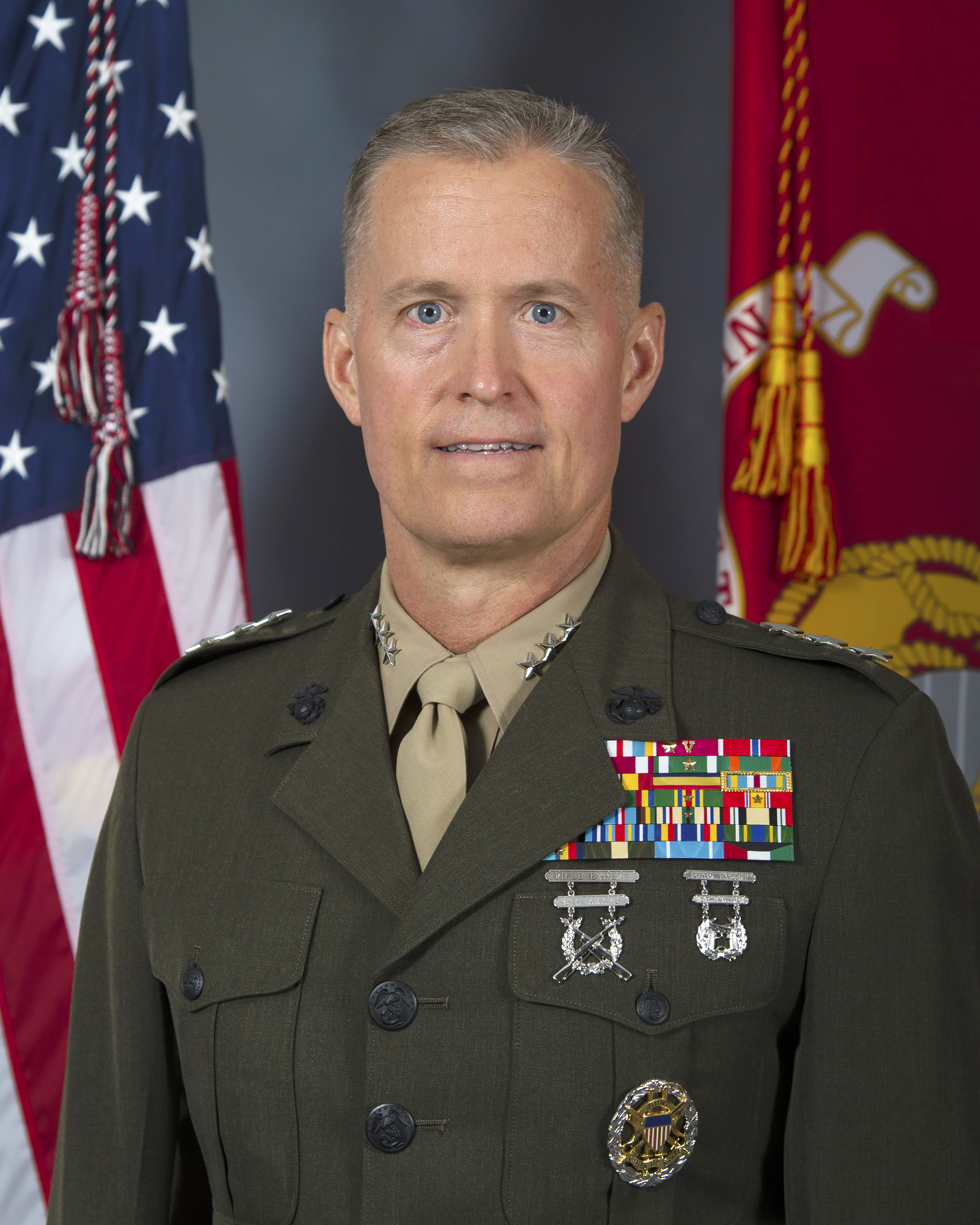
- Born: 1960 (age 65–66)
- Relatives: Carl Epting Mundy Jr. (father)
- Military career
- Allegiance: United States
- Branch: United States Marine Corps
- Service years: 1983–2021
- Rank: Lieutenant General
- Commands: United States Marine Forces Central Command; United States Marine Forces Special Operations Command; 5th Marine Expeditionary Brigade; 6th Marine Regiment; 3rd Battalion, 5th Marines; 13th Marine Expeditionary Unit (MEU)
- Conflicts: Gulf War; Iraq War
- Awards: Defense Superior Service Medal; Legion of Merit (2); Bronze Star Medal

Carl Epting Mundy III (born 1960) is a retired lieutenant general in the United States Marine Corps, who last served as commander of the United States Marine Forces Central Command. He previously served as commander of the United States Marine Forces Special Operations Command. He is the son of Carl Epting Mundy Jr., who was a Marine Corps general and Commandant of the Marine Corps.

== Marine Corps career ==
Mundy graduated from Auburn University in 1983 and was commissioned a second lieutenant. Mundy graduated from USMC Officer Candidate School and The Basic School. He received assignment to 2nd Battalion, 1st Marines, where he commanded a rifle platoon. As a captain, he commanded Charlie Company, 1st Battalion 9th Marines, which is a rifle company in the 1st Marine Division. He deployed to Somalia during Operation Restore Hope. Mundy later served as executive officer of the 1st Marine Regiment. Upon promotion to the rank of lieutenant colonel, Mundy assumed command of 3rd Battalion, 5th Marines. He deployed twice to Iraq, first as a battalion commander and later as a Marine Expeditionary Unit commander during Operation Iraqi Freedom. As a colonel, Mundy commanded the 6th Marine Regiment.

Mundy is a graduate of the Marine Corps Command and Staff College, Joint Forces Staff College and the USMC School of Advanced Warfighting.

Mundy has also served various staff and training assignments, beginning with the Marine Corps Recruit Depot Parris Island in South Carolina; The Basic School at Marine Corps Base Quantico; operations officer, I Marine Expeditionary Force headquarters at Camp Pendleton; the Marine Corps Office of Legislative Affairs; the Joint Improvised Explosive Device Defeat Organization in Washington D.C.; Headquarters Marine Corps in Washington D.C; United States Central Command in Tampa; and as the Deputy Commanding General of I Marine Expeditionary Force at Camp Pendleton. As a brigadier general, he served as both the Commanding General of 5th Marine Expeditionary Brigade and the Commander of Task Force 51 located in Bahrain. Mundy relinquished command of 5th Marine Expeditionary Brigade to Brigadier General Francis L. Donovan on June 23, 2016. As a major general, Mundy took command of Marine Corps Forces Special Operations Command (MARSOC) from 2016 to 2018. Mundy relinquished command of MARSOC to Major General Daniel Yoo in August 2018. After being promoted to lieutenant general, Mundy assumed command of Marine Corps Forces Central Command.

He retired from active duty in October 2021.

== Awards and decorations ==
U.S. military decorations
Defense Superior Service Medal
Legion of Merit with Combat Distinguishing device and one gold award star
Bronze Star Medal
Meritorious Service Medal
Navy and Marine Corps Commendation Medal with award star
Navy and Marine Corps Achievement Medal
Combat Action Ribbon
U.S. Unit Awards
Navy Presidential Unit Citation
Joint Meritorious Unit Award
Navy Unit Commendation
Navy Meritorious Unit Commendation with one bronze campaign star
U.S. Service (Campaign) Medals and Service and Training Ribbons
National Defense Service Medal with bronze campaign stars
Armed Forces Expeditionary Medal
Southwest Asia Service Medal with bronze campaign stars
Iraq Campaign Medal
Global War on Terrorism Expeditionary Medal
Global War on Terrorism Service Medal
Korea Defense Service Medal
Navy Sea Service Deployment Ribbon with silver and bronze service stars
Marine Corps Drill Instructor Ribbon
United Nations Medal
Kuwait Liberation Medal (Kuwait)

U.S. badges, patches and tabs
Rifle Expert Badge
Pistol Expert Badge
Office of the Joint Chiefs of Staff Identification Badge

Military offices
Preceded by ???	Commanding General of the 5th Marine Expeditionary Brigade; 2014–2016	Succeeded by Francis L. Donovan
Preceded by Joseph Osterman	Commanding General of the United States Marine Forces Special Operations Command; 2016–2018	Succeeded by Daniel Yoo
Preceded by William D. Beydler	Commander of the United States Marine Forces Central Command; 2018–2021	Succeeded by Paul J. Rock Jr.
