= MV Sun Express =

Coordinates: 13°23′S 49°58′E

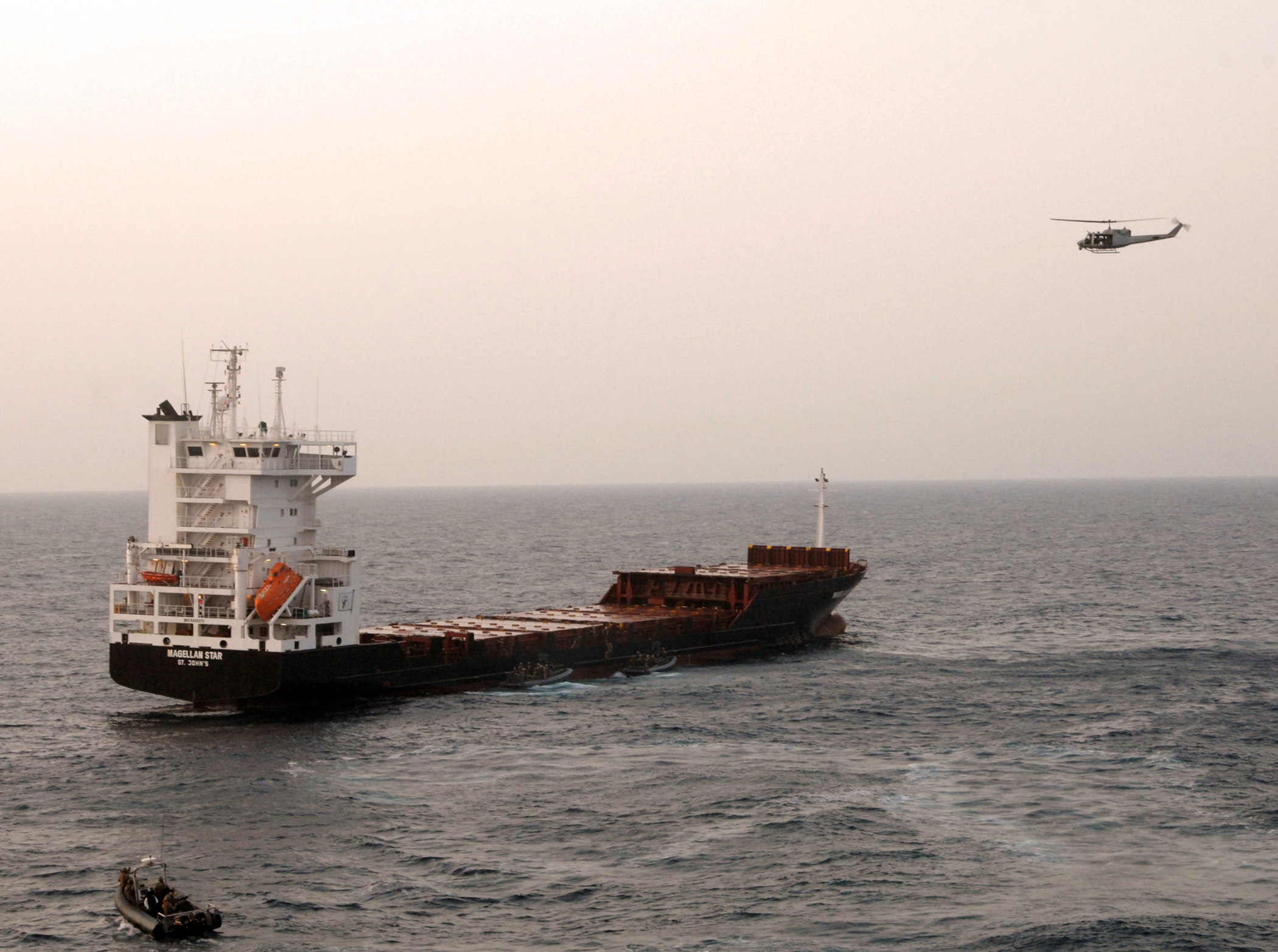
- A UH1N Twin Huey helicopter provides cover as Marines board the MV Magellan Star during a board and seizure.

History
- Name: Sun Express since 2012; Previously Magellan Star, Conmar Cape, Judith Borchard, Gracechurch Star. Built as Pioneer Albatross.
- Port of registry: Antigua and Barbuda
- Laid down: 5 December 2000
- Launched: 28 March 2002
- Completed: 2002
- Identification: IMO number: 9242572; Call sign: V2OE7; MMSI number: 304408000
- Notes: Classed by Germanischer Lloyd since 2002.

General characteristics
- Class & type: Container ship
- Tonnage: 6,277 GT; 3,249 NT; 7,933 DWT
- Length: 133.53 m (438.1 ft)
- Beam: 18.70 m (61.4 ft)
- Draught: 7.223 m (23.70 ft)
- Capacity: 735 TEU
- Crew: 19

MV Sun Express is a German-owned container ship registered under the flag of convenience of Antigua and Barbuda. A U.S. Marine Force Reconnaissance team boarded the ship off the coast of Somalia on 9 September 2010, reclaiming control from pirates who had seized the ship and taken the crew hostage. At the time it was captured by pirates the ship was traveling from Bilbao, Spain, to Singapore with a cargo of anchor chains.

== The raid ==
Just before dawn, the U.S. team from the 15th Marine Expeditionary Unit's Maritime Raid Force launched the assault from aboard the USS Dubuque (LPD-8), an amphibious transport ship. It was the first time U.S. military forces off Somalia had staged an action to board a commercial vessel in which pirates were on board with hostages, said a U.S. Navy spokesman.

== Grounding ==
On 3 November 2012, Conmar Cape ran aground off Subic Bay whilst on a voyage from Manila, Philippines to Hong Kong. She was refloated between 16 and 18 November.
