= United States Marine Corps Forces Central Command =

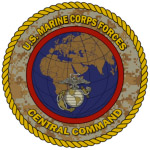
- MARCENT insignia.
- Active: 1999–present
- Country: United States
- Type: Marine Combined arms
- Role: Amphibious and expeditionary warfare
- Part of: United States Central Command
- Garrison/HQ: MacDill AFB

Commanders
- Commander: Lieutenant General Joseph R. Clearfield
- Deputy Commander: Vacant
- Sergeant Major: Sergeant Major Jay D. Williamson

The United States Marine Corps Forces Central Command is headquartered at MacDill Air Force Base in Tampa, Florida. The Marine Corps Force Central Command is responsible for all Marine Corps Forces in the United States Central Command, except for those assigned to the U.S. Special Operations Command, and Special Operations Command, Central Command.

The Command's responsibility includes 20 countries and over 500 million people in regions including Arabian Sea, Red Sea, Persian Gulf, and part of the Indian Ocean. The terrain ranges from mountain ranges with elevations of more than 24,000 feet and desert areas below sea level and temperatures ranging from below freezing to 130 °F (54 °C). The region contains the major maritime trade routes which link the Middle East, Europe, Asia and the Western Hemisphere.

The Command regularly deploys Marines aboard U.S. Navy amphibious ships to the region, organized as Marine Air Ground Task Forces. There have been Marines stationed at the Central Command since September 1982, but Marine Central Command only came into existence in 1990, in preparation for Operations Desert Shield and Desert Storm in Southwest Asia.

The Command has partaken, through Marine Corps Forces Pacific, Operation Enduring Freedom in Afghanistan and Pakistan, operations in the Central Asian States as well as the Horn of Africa, and Operation Iraqi Freedom.

== History ==
The Marine Corps did not have a service component command at the Central Command headquarters until 1990. During the Gulf War, the Commanding General of I Marine Expeditionary Force (I MEF) was also titled as Commander, Marine Corps Forces Central Command (MARCENT). In 1992, the Marine Corps gave this role to the Commander of U.S. Marine Corps Forces, Pacific, though the title was only to be used as needed. In 1996 a Marine Liaison Office was opened at CENTCOM headquarters, MacDill Air Force Base, being known as MARCENT, and in 1999 this office was upgraded to Headquarters Marine Corps Forces Central Command. At this point the Deputy Commander of MARFORPAC was responsible for overseeing MARCENT. In 2001, the Commander of MARFORPAC formally took on the role of leading MARCENT. Having one officer commanding both the Central Command and Pacific Command service components was too much, and in 2005 the Marine Corps gave the role of MARCENT commander to the Commanding General of I MEF. The decision to create a free standing MARCENT headquarters was made as the wars in Iraq and Afghanistan continued. In 2012, Lieutenant General Robert Neller became the first dedicated head of MARCENT at MacDill AFB, fully focused on the Middle East.

== List of commanders ==
No.	Commander		Term			Ref
No.	Portrait	Name	Took office	Left office	Term length	Ref
Commander MARCENT / Commanding General I MEF
1	Walter E. Boomer	Lieutenant General; Walter E. Boomer (born 1938)	15 August 1990	6 September 1991	250 days	
Commander MARCENT / Commander MARFORPAC / Commanding General FMFPAC
2	Earl B. Hailston	Lieutenant General; Earl B. Hailston (born 1947)	16 August 2001	1 August 2003	1 year, 350 days	
3	Wallace C. Gregson	Lieutenant General; Wallace C. Gregson (born 1946)	1 August 2003	5 August 2005	2 years, 4 days	
Commander MARCENT / Commanding General I MEF
4	John F. Sattler	Lieutenant General; John F. Sattler (born 1949)	3 August 2005	14 August 2006	1 year, 11 days	
5	James Mattis	Lieutenant General; James Mattis (born 1950)	14 August 2006	5 November 2007	1 year, 83 days	
6	Samuel T. Helland	Lieutenant General; Samuel T. Helland (born 1947/1948)	5 November 2007	16 October 2009	2 years, 348 days	
7	Joseph Dunford	Lieutenant General; Joseph Dunford (born 1955)	16 October 2009	19 October 2010	1 year, 3 days	
8	Thomas D. Waldhauser	Lieutenant General; Thomas D. Waldhauser (born 1953)	19 October 2010	12 September 2012	1 year, 329 days	
Commander MARCENT
9	Robert Neller	Lieutenant General; Robert Neller (born 1953)	12 September 2012	18 June 2014	1 year, 279 days	
10	Kenneth F. McKenzie Jr.	Lieutenant General; Kenneth F. McKenzie Jr. (born 1956/1957)	18 June 2014	27 October 2015	1 year, 131 days	
11	William D. Beydler	Lieutenant General; William D. Beydler	27 October 2015	11 July 2018	2 years, 257 days	
12	Carl E. Mundy III	Lieutenant General; Carl E. Mundy III (born 1960)	11 July 2018	October 2021	~3 years, 82 days	
13	Paul J. Rock	Major General; Paul J. Rock	October 2021	1 August 2023	~1 year, 304 days	
14	Christopher A. McPhillips	Major General; Christopher A. McPhillips	1 August 2023	2 September 2025	2 years, 32 days	
15	Joseph R. Clearfield	Lieutenant General; Joseph R. Clearfield	2 October 2025	Incumbent	156 days	
