= Headquarters Marine Corps =

Military headquarters in the United States

Agency overview
- Headquarters: The Pentagon
- Agency executive: General Eric M. Smith, CMC
- Parent agency: Department of the Navy
- Website: www.hqmc.marines.mil

The Headquarters Marine Corps (HQMC) is a headquarters staff within the Department of the Navy which includes the offices of the Commandant of the Marine Corps, the Assistant Commandant of the Marine Corps and various staff functions. The function, composition, and general duties of HQMC are defined in Title 10 of the United States Code, Subtitle C, Part I, Chapter 506 (Headquarters, Marine Corps).

HQMC "consists of the Commandant of the Marine Corps and those staff agencies that advise and assist him in discharging his responsibilities prescribed by law and higher authority. The Commandant is directly responsible to the Secretary of the Navy for the total performance of the Marine Corps. This includes the administration, discipline, internal organization, training, requirements, efficiency, and readiness of the service. The Commandant is also responsible for the operation of the Marine Corps material support system."

HQMC is currently spread throughout the Washington, D.C., Virginia, and Maryland area, to include the Pentagon, Henderson Hall, Marine Barracks, Washington, D.C., Marine Corps Base Quantico, and the Washington Navy Yard.

== Components ==
Organization of HQMC, 2006.

- Chaplain of the Marine Corps
- Marine Corps Operational Test and Evaluation Activity
- Command, Control, Communications & Computers (includes the Marine Corps Tactical Systems Support Activity)
- Counsel for the Commandant
- Director, Marine Corps Staff
- Sergeant Major of the Marine Corps
- Headquarters Battalion
- Health Services
- History Division
- Inspector General of the Marine Corps
- Deputy Commandant for Aviation
- Deputy Commandant for Information
- Deputy Commandant, Manpower & Reserve Affairs
- Deputy Commandant, Plans, Policies & Operations
- Deputy Commandant, Programs & Resources
- Deputy Commandant, Installations and Logistics (includes the Marine Corps Installations Command (MCICOM))
- Deputy Commandant, Combat Development & Integration (including the Marine Corps Combat Development Command)
- Marine Corps Intelligence
  - Marine Corps Counterintelligence
  - Marine Corps Intelligence Activity
- Marine Corps Aviation
- Marine Corps Recruiting Command
- Marine Corps Systems Command
- Marine Corps Logistics Command
- Marine Corps Intelligence Command
- Logistics Modernization
- Marine Corps Community Services
  - Marine Corps Exchange
- Marine Corps Uniform Board
- Navy and Marine Corps Appellate Leave Activity
- Office of Legislative Affairs
- Public Affairs
- Safety Division
- Sexual Assault Prevention & Response Office (SAPRO)
- United States Marine Corps Criminal Investigation Division
- United States Marine Corps Military Police
  - Provost Marshal of the United States Marine Corps
- Staff Judge Advocate to the Commandant
- Military Secretary to the Commandant of the Marine Corps
- Training and Education Command (TECOM)

== See also ==
- Organization of the United States Marine Corps
- Office of the Chief of Naval Operations (U.S. Navy counterpart)
