= Defense Information Systems Agency =

US Department of Defense combat support agency

Defense Information Systems Agency (DISA)
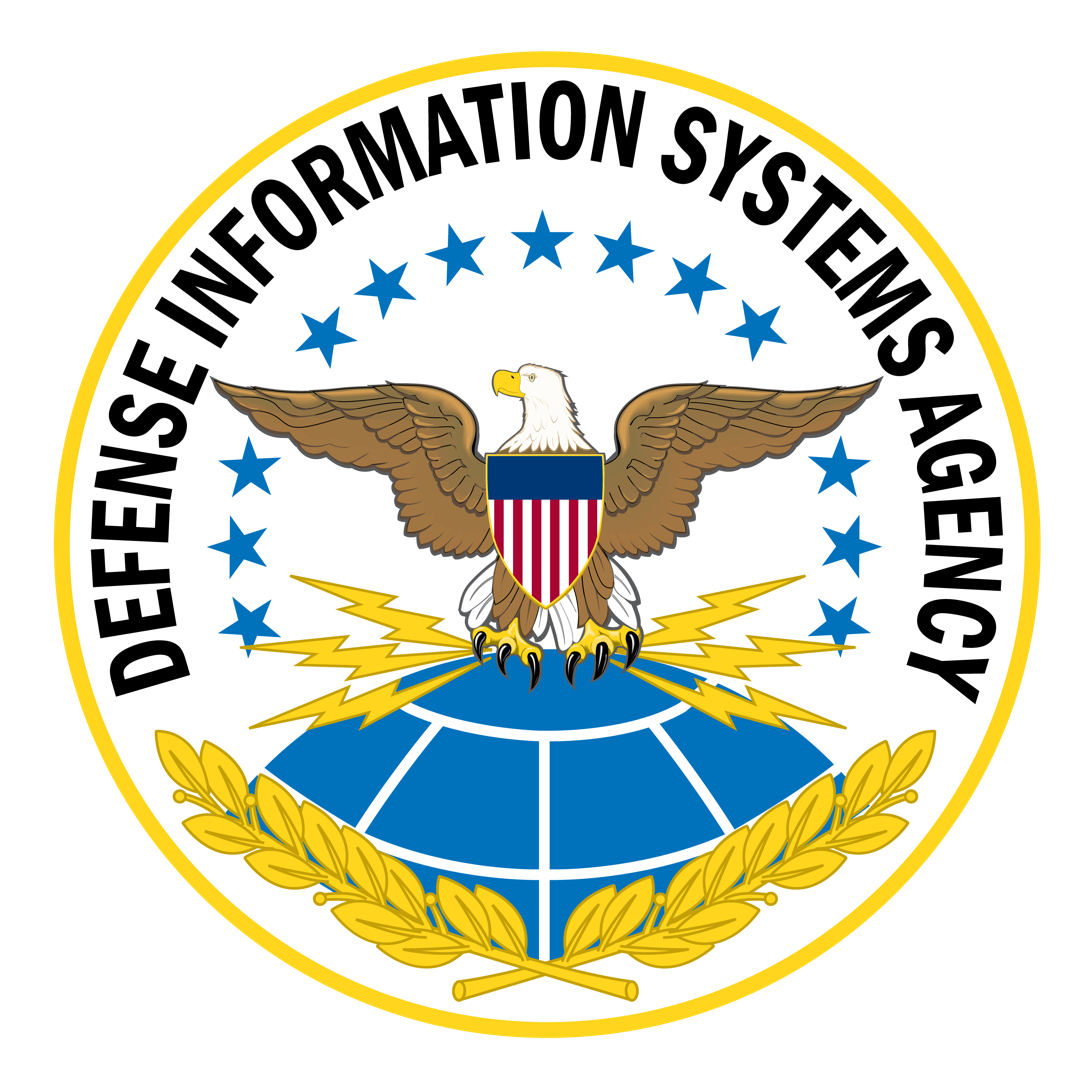
- Official seal, revised in 2023.

Agency overview
- Formed: June 25, 1991
- Preceding agency: Defense Communications Agency (DCA), founded May 12, 1960.
- Jurisdiction: U.S. Department of Defense
- Headquarters: Fort George G. Meade, Maryland, U.S.
- Motto: The premier IT and telecommunications provider for the United States military.
- Employees: 7,000
- Annual budget: $12 b
- Agency executive: LTG Paul T. Stanton, USA, Director
- Parent agency: Department of Defense
- Website: disa.mil

The Defense Information Systems Agency (DISA), known as the Defense Communications Agency (DCA) until 1991, is a United States Department of Defense (DoD) combat support agency. It is composed of military, federal civilians, and contractors. DISA provides information technology (IT) and communications support to the president, vice president, secretary of defense, the Department of Defense, the combatant commands, and any individual or system contributing to the defense of the United States.

== History ==
=== 1960s: The Defense Communications Agency ===
DCA was established May 12, 1960, with the primary mission of operational control and management of the Defense Communications System (DCS).

The initial headquarters for 34 DCA members was Wake Hall, one of a complex of three buildings (which included Midway Hall and Guam Hall) on the site where the parking lot of Robert F. Kennedy Stadium in Washington, D.C. stands today. Navy Rear Admiral William D. Irvin became the first DCA director in July. In September, Rear Admiral Irvin moved his staff to office space in Building 12 at the Naval Services Center, 701 Courthouse Road, Arlington, Va., the site of the U.S. Navy's old Radio Arlington Station.

DCA's first major tasks were to identify the DCS elements and develop an implementation and management plan. The DCS was essentially a collection of communications systems turned over by the military departments with considerable restrictions. Key among these responsibilities was the establishment of three common-user, defense-wide networks that would be known as the Automatic Voice Network (AUTOVON), the Automatic Digital Network (AUTODIN), and the Automatic Secure Voice Communications Network (AUTOSEVOCOM). For each, DCA sought to determine its overall system configuration and prepare the technical specifications necessary for the equipment for switching centers, interconnecting transmission media, and subscriber terminals.

With the arrival of the space-age, DCA was designated as the “strong focal point” for development, integration, and operation of the space and ground elements of a number of satellite-based communications initiatives. The most important of these would be the DCA-managed Defense Satellite Communications System (DSCS).

DARPA began planning for a truly strategic geosynchronous communication system in 1958, assigning the Air Force Ballistic Missile Division responsibility for the booster and spacecraft and the Army Signal Corps the communications element. Initially consisting of three repeater satellite programs, in September 1959 the secretary of defense transferred responsibility for communications satellite management from DARPA to the Army. In February 1960, the three programs were combined into Project Advent, which was assigned to the Army in September that year. However, the Army would not have operational responsibility for military satellite communications, as the Defense Department was unifying the strategic communications systems of the Army, Navy, and Air Force as part of the Defense Communications System, operated by the Defense Communications Agency, which was established on 12 May 1960. Project Advent was considered to be a very ambitious program, with the first tranche of satellites launched into 5,600 mile inclined orbits by Air Force Ballistic Missile Division Atlas-Agena launch vehicles, with the second tranche launched into geostationary orbits by AFBMD Atlas-Centaurs. Given cost overruns and technological breakthroughs in smaller satellites, Project Advent was cancelled on 23 May 1962.

The Cuban Missile Crisis of October 1962 showed the need for direct, timely, and private communications between the leaders of the world's two superpowers, the United States and the Soviet Union. A duplex cable circuit (later augmented by a satellite hookup) between the two capitals known as the Moscow–Washington hotline or "Red Telephone", became operational August 30, 1963. Program management and engineering for the “Hotline” was assigned to DCA. The system continues intact today with direct links to more than 40 foreign leaders. Another direct result of the Cuban Missile Crisis was the creation of the Worldwide Military Command and Control System (WWMCCS) to enable national command authorities to exercise effective command and control of their widely dispersed forces.

While DCA dealt with the communication crises of the Cold War, a “hot war” was waging in Southeast Asia. America's commitment to South Vietnam led to the creation of a DCA Southeast Asia Region unit in 1964. DCA developed a plan to integrate the region's communication systems into a single modern network. The system would extend the commercial-quality communications provided by satellites and cables to the battlefield.

=== 1970s ===
DCA assumed responsibility for the Minimum Essential Emergency Communications Network (MEECN), a subsystem of WWMCCS, in December 1971. The MEECN was developed to assure the timely receipt of emergency action messages by worldwide U.S. nuclear forces under nuclear attack by the Soviet Union. DCA served as the MEECN system engineer and provided the broad engineering necessary to ensure a more survivable future network with compatible, interoperable, and secure subsystems.

In the late 1960s and early 1970s DCA, through its NMCS Technical Support Directorate, had responsibility for the technical support, planning, and system engineering for the four command centers then comprising the NMCS. These were the NMCC and the National Emergency Airborne Command Post (these funded by the USAF), the Alternate National Military Command Center (funded by the Army), and the National Emergency Command Post Afloat (funded by the Navy, and deactivated in the late 1960s). DCA performed the requirements collection and analysis, system engineering, funding estimation, subsystem project plan development, and establishment of the initial physical architecture for the expansion of the NMCC that was implemented by the Air Force in the 1970s.

A DoD directive issued in the early 1970s appointed DCA as the system architect for all defense satellite communications. A major new DCA headquarters staff directorate, the Military Satellite Communications (MILSATCOM) System Office, was created to discharge the new role. As the system architect, DCA coordinated all defense satellite communications planning and programs to avoid duplication and ensure communications interoperability among the diverse systems serving the complete spectrum of defense needs.

=== 1980s ===
The momentum of major improvements in national security telecommunications accelerated rapidly in the 1980s. Along with the unprecedented peacetime military build-up under the Reagan Administration came the proliferation of government-owned and government-leased networks and a high emphasis on interoperability among the military services. The pace of technological advancement brought with it new opportunities for system improvements.

The desire for interoperability in military communications did not originate in the 1980s. The need for communications systems that talked to each other within an individual military service and among the services together went back to the needs generated by the global proportions of WWII. Indeed, it was the lack of interoperability that drove the Eisenhower administration to seek one organization to pull together the services’ disparate systems to speak with one voice – that organization was DCA. But interoperability still had yet to be achieved by the 1980s.

In April 1986, the assistant secretary of defense for command and control, communications and intelligence proposed the consolidation of DCA and the Joint Tactical Command, Control, and Communications Agency (JTC3A) in view of the “climate within DoD of streamlining and reducing overhead functions.” The Joint Staff endorsed the proposal because it also provided some operational efficiency.

In January 1987, the secretary of defense approved the consolidation of DCA and JTC3A. A year later, DCA absorbed the Tri-Service Tactical Communications Joint Test Element and JTC3A Joint Operability Test Facility. DCA consolidated these organizations into a new organization in 1989, establishing the Joint Interoperability Test Command (JITC) at Fort Huachuca, Arizona. JITC provided the facility for DoD and private-sector interoperability compliance testing and certification.

In October 1989, the deputy secretary of defense established a DoD Corporate Information Management (CIM) Initiative to identify and implement management efficiencies in DoD information systems. DCA was given responsibility for implementing the CIM initiative, and its mission was expanded to include information support to the JCS and Office of the Secretary of Defense, tactical information system standards and interoperability, and White House information systems.

=== 1990s ===
In 1990 and 1991, during Operations Desert Shield and Desert Storm, a team of planners, engineers, and operators from DCA's Defense Network Systems Organization (DNSO) assisted in the design of a semi-fixed telecommunications system, the Southwest Asia Telecommunications (SATS) for use in support of the theater commander's operations. SATS included satellite, microwave, copper cable, and fiber optic links; Defense Data Network packet-switching nodes; Defense Switched Network (DSN) multi-function voice switches; and technical control facilities. At their peak, these systems included more than 100 satellite links.

On June 25, 1991, DCA underwent a major reorganization and was renamed the Defense Information Systems Agency (DISA) to reflect its expanded role in implementing the DoD's CIM (Corporate Information Management) initiative and to clearly identify DISA as a combat support agency. DISA established the Center for Information Management to provide technical and program execution assistance to the assistant secretary of defense (C3I) and technical products and services to DoD and military components.

DISA's role in DoD information management continued to expand with implementation of several Defense Management Report Decisions (DMRD ), most notably DMRD 918, in September 1992. DMRD 918 created the Defense Information Infrastructure (DII) and directed DISA to manage and consolidate the Services’ and DoD's information processing centers into 16 mega-centers. During the 1990s, DISA fielded new systems to support the combatant commands. The Global Command and Control System (GCCS) and the Joint Chiefs’ C4I (Command, Control, Communications, Computers, and Intelligence) for the Warrior, and the Defense Message System were among the critical systems. GCCS was developed to replace WWMCCS, which had been in existence since the early 1960s.

=== 2000s ===
With the new century, DISA faced even greater challenges as a DoD service provider. Preserving radio spectrum, information assurance, ensuring interoperability, and establishing secure wireless links were just some of the tasks performed by the agency. Perhaps the most significant achievement of the agency in 2001 was its immediate response in the aftermath of the attacks of Sept. 11, 2001. DISA justified $300 million in supplemental funds to support the Global War on Terrorism by providing critical communications paths and command and control enhancements for warfighters.

In the 18 months between September 2001 and April 2003, DISA supported the exponential use and increased capacity of information systems. The Defense Switched Network (DSN) infrastructure increased 400 percent. The Secret Internet Protocol (IP) Data Service (formerly known as the SIPRNet) capacity increased 292 percent. Sensitive but Unclassified Internet Protocol (IP) Data Service (formerly known as NIPRNet) capacity increased 509 percent. The Defense Video System Global (Secure) increased 1,150 percent. Satellite bandwidth increased 800 percent. The Enhanced Mobile Satellite Service (EMSS) capacity increased 300 percent, and usage increased 3,000 percent. EMSS allowed Special Operations forces to even call in air strikes from horseback in Afghanistan by permitting instantaneous communications in areas without any infrastructure whatsoever.

For Operation Iraqi Freedom in 2003, DISA provided 30 times more bandwidth to a 45-percent smaller force than in Operation Desert Storm in 1991. DISA facilitated multiple enhancements to the nation's preeminent joint command-and-control system and provided a real-time battle space picture.

After the previous consolidation of 194 data-processing centers in the 1990s into 16 computing mega-centers, DISA further reduced the number of mega-centers from 16 to six. Starting in 2003, DISA managed the six-year, $326 million effort to completely modernize presidential communications — the largest such initiative in the 61-year history of the White House Communications Agency. The “Pioneer Program” transformed presidential communications by employing net-centric concepts to put voice, video, and data at the president's fingertips on an around-the-clock basis.

The Global Information Grid Bandwidth Expansion (GIG-BE) Program was a major DoD net-centric transformational initiative executed by DISA. The $877 million program was the largest DoD information technology transport structure ever built. GIG-BE created a ubiquitous "bandwidth-available" environment to improve national security intelligence, surveillance, reconnaissance, information assurance, and command and control at locations worldwide. On Dec. 20, 2005, the GIG-BE program achieved the milestone of full operational capability at all of the almost 100 Joint Staff-approved sites.

=== 2010s ===
DISA's 50 years of service as the Defense Communications Agency and later the Defense Information Systems Agency was recognized May 12, 2010, during an anniversary celebration at Seven Skyline Place, Falls Church, Va. Army LTG Carroll F. Pollett, the DISA director at the time, led the celebration of the agency's storied past.

From 2008 through 2010, DISA worked directly with the commander, United States Central Command (USCENTCOM), to design and implement a high-capacity, strategic communication network into an active Theater of Operations, ensuring reliable communications for intra-theater mission partners and to national leadership. Prior to this installation, the coalition forces in Afghanistan were dependent on satellite communications and tactical microwave links, which had limited bandwidth capacity and induced significant delay.

DISA operated and defended the Global Information Grid (GIG), providing information capabilities with a reach from the White House to forces at the tactical edge. DISA supported execution of military operations while simultaneously supporting peacekeeping, humanitarian assistance, and disaster-relief missions in multiple theaters around the globe. During a 4-month period in 2011, DISA provided support to an unprecedented six simultaneous operations: Operation NEW DAWN in Iraq; Operation ENDURING FREEDOM in Afghanistan; Operation UNIFIED RESPONSE in Haiti; Operation ODYSSEY DAWN and NATO Operation UNIFIED PROTECTOR in Libya, Operation TOMODACHI in Japan; and DISA's global cyber operations in support of United States Cyber Command (USCYBERCOM).

From January to July 2011, DISA relocated more than 4,500 military and civilian employees and supporting onsite contractors, 700 workstation suites with 11,000 pieces of IT equipment, and 58,000 square feet of lab equipment in accordance with the Base Realignment and Closure legislation of 2005. The relocation to Fort George G. Meade, MD., consolidated DISA headquarters elements that were housed in multiple locations in Arlington and Falls Church, Va. In April 2011, DISA held a ribbon cutting ceremony officially opening the new headquarters complex.

=== 2020s ===
Computer systems controlled by DISA were hacked in the summer of 2019, and was reported in February 2020, exposing the personal data of about 200,000 people including names and social security numbers.

The United States Army is seeking to reduce its NIPRNet footprint by 2023 and its SIPRnet footprint by 2024.

== Services ==
DISA offers the following services:

=== Command and Control ===
Command and Control (C2) systems provide the U.S. military commander with the information to make effective decisions and provide the warfighter the capability to access the information necessary to complete their mission. The C2 portfolio contains the Global Command and Control System - Joint (GCCS-J), Multinational Information Sharing (MNIS), Joint Planning and Execution Services (JPES), and Personal Digital Assistant 184 (PDA-184).

==== PDA-184 ====
The DISA PDA-184 software application implements a fully compliant MIL-STD-188-184A data controller. It provides reliable data communications over noisy, low bandwidth channels to support chat, file transfer, and email services via an easy-to-use graphical user interface. The application supports multiple bands and waveforms, including integrated waveform (IW), legacy ultra-high frequency (UHF) satellite communications (SATCOM), UHF line of sight (LOS), very high frequency (VHF), high frequency (HF), and extremely high frequency (EHF) SATCOM. PDA-184 is provided without charge to all combatant commands (CCMDs) / services / agencies (CC/S/A).

==== MNIS – Applications ====
===== CENTRIXS =====
CENTRIXS is the Combatant Commander's network for coalition. CENTRIXS is designed to be a global, interoperable, interconnected, inexpensive, and easy-to use system to share intelligence and operations information through reliable communications connectivity, data manipulation, and automated processes. The CENTRIXS environment is a combination of network and applications services. CENTRIXS provides a secured exchange of intelligence and operational information through reliable communication networks There are 40+ CENTRIXS networks/communities of interest (COIs) providing selected centralized services including: Active Directory/DNS Roots, VoIP, WSUS and Anti-Virus Definitions, and at least 80 countries plus NATO nations participate in the various CENTRIXS networks/COIs.

===== Pegasus/Griffin =====
Pegasus/Griffin is a multinationally-developed, managed and resourced collection of networks and services that provides information sharing among the 5-Eyes national classified (SECRET level) networks and C2 systems. Griffin enables participating nations to plan, implement and execute multinational planning and operations from the strategic to tactical headquarters level. It permits users to share SECRET REL information from their national C2 system workstations.

===== CFBLNET =====
The Combined Federated Battle Laboratories Network (CFBLNet) is a coalition RDT&E (Research, Development, Test, and Evaluation) environment with Combined Communications-Electronics Board (CCEB) and the North Atlantic Treaty Organization (NATO) and other charter nations/organizations. CFBLNet leverages existing CCEB, NATO, and other national laboratories and test beds to support a wide range of coalition ISTAR (Intelligence, surveillance, target acquisition, and reconnaissance) experimentation and interoperability testing. As a combined environment and network, members have equal say in its use and management, yet specific initiatives may be configured among any number of participants. CFBLNet members respect sovereign and intellectual property rights of activities conducted on the network. CFBLNet is primarily a fee for service activity. and system injector.

=== Computing ===
DISA's computing services portfolio includes mainframe hosting, application monitoring, and server hosting and virtualization. DISA manages all the partner data, hardware components, software, and labor.

=== Contracting ===
DISA purchases telecommunications and information technology (IT) products and services for the U.S. military using a variety of contract vehicles.

=== Enterprise Engineering ===
Enterprise Engineering refers to the Global Information Grid (a.k.a. the GIG). DISA plans, designs, constructs, and analyzes the effectiveness of the U.S. military's cyberspace and establishes the technological standards to make the GIG secure and reliable. The enterprise engineering portfolio includes the Joint Communication Simulation System (JCSS), GIG Technical Guidance for Information Technology Standards, and Interoperability Enhancement Process/iSmart (IEP/iSmart).

=== Enterprise Services ===
Enterprise services provided by DISA to its mission partners fall under three categories: Applications, Infrastructure, and Identity and Access Management.

Applications

- Global Video Services (GVS)
- DoD Enterprise Email (DEE)
- DoD Enterprise Portal Service (DEPS)
- Defense Collaboration Services (DCS)
- FORGE.MIL
- Defense Messaging Service
- Strategic Knowledge Integration Web (SKIWeb)
- Automated Time, Attendance, and Production System (ATAAPS)
- Enterprise Search

Infrastructure

- Rapid Access Computing Environment (RACE)
- Global Content Delivery Service (GCDS)
- Enterprise Service Monitoring
- Enterprise Messaging
- Enterprise Service Bus (ESB)
- Data Services Environment (DSE)
- Hosting Services
- Secure Technology Application eXecution (STAX)

Identity and Access Management

- DoD Visitor
- Enterprise Directory Services (EDS)
- Enterprise Attribute Application Forest (EASF) / Identity Synchronization Services (IDSS)
- Open Source Attribute-Based Access Control (ABAC)

=== Information Assurance ===
DISA's Information Assurance services serve the purpose of:

- Making data ubiquitously accessible while simultaneously restricting access
- Promoting the safe sharing of information
- Preventing attacks by having network protections in place

=== Network Services ===
The Defense Information Systems Network (DISN) is a worldwide-protected telecommunications network that enables the exchange of information in an interoperable and global space, partitioned by security demands, transmission requirements, and geographic needs of targeted end-user communities.

Nowadays, DISA maintains the following network services, to support diverse telecommunication requirements for organizations focused on, but not limited to, the Department of Defense (DoD):

Data:

- SBU IP Data (formerly known as NIPRNet)
- Secret IP Data (formerly known as SIPRNet)
- TS/SCI IP Data (formerly known as JWICS)
- Secret Test & Evaluation IP Data (formerly known as DISN-LES)
- Private IP Service

Voice:

- SBU Voice (over VoIP and DSN networks)
- VoSIP (VoIP over the secure SIPRNet)
- TS/SCI Voice (formerly known as JWICS Voice)
- Multilevel Secure Voice (formerly known as DRSN)
- DISA Enterprise CVVoIP

Video:

- Global Video Services (GVS)
- TS/SCI Videoconferencing (formerly known as JWICS Videoconferencing)

Messaging:

- Organizational Messaging Service (formerly known as DMS)

Wireless:

- Enhanced Mobile Satellite Services (EMSS)
- Secure Mobile Environment - Portable Electronic Device (SME-PED)

Satellite:
Providing access to DISN through

- Commercial Satellite (COMSATCOM)
- INMARSAT

=== Spectrum Management ===
Through the Defense Spectrum Organization (DSO), DISA provides commanders direct operational support, including electromagnetic battlespace planning, deconfliction, and joint spectrum interference resolution. DSO services include:

- Spectrum Management Operational Support to the Combatant Commands
- Spectrum-related Applied Engineering
  - Spectrum Technology Testbed Initiative (STTI)
- Joint Spectrum Center Ordnance Electromagnetic Environmental Effects Risk Assessment Database (JOERAD)
- Electromagnetic Environmental Effects (E3) and Spectrum Supportability Training and Awareness
- Global Electromagnetic Spectrum Information System (GEMSIS)
  - Joint Spectrum Data Repository (JSDR)
  - Integrated Spectrum Desktop (ISD)
  - Spectrum XXI (SXXI)
  - End to End Spectrum Supportability (E2ESS): (Stepstone and Host Nation Spectrum Worldwide Database Online (HNSWDO))

=== Testing ===
DISA's Joint Interoperability Test Command (JITC) provides testing and joint certification for Department of Defense net-centric systems.

== List of directors ==
No.	Director		Term			Service branch
No.	Portrait	Name	Took office	Left office	Term length	Service branch
1	Alfred Dodd Starbird	Lieutenant General; Alfred Dodd Starbird	March 1962	November 1967	~5 years, 245 days	U.S. Army
2	Richard P. Klocko	Lieutenant General; Richard P. Klocko	November 1967	August 1971	~3 years, 273 days	U.S. Air Force
3	Gordon T. Gould	Lieutenant General; Gordon T. Gould	September 1971	July 1974	~2 years, 303 days	U.S. Air Force
4	Lee M. Paschall	Lieutenant General; Lee M. Paschall	July 1974	July 1978	~4 years, 0 days	U.S. Air Force
5	Samuel Gravely	Vice Admiral; Samuel Gravely	September 1978	July 1980	~1 year, 304 days	U.S. Navy
6	William J. Hilsman	Lieutenant General; William J. Hilsman	September 1980	September 1983	~3 years, 0 days	U.S. Army
7	Winston D. Powers	Lieutenant General; Winston D. Powers	September 1983	May 1987	~3 years, 242 days	U.S. Air Force
8	John T. Myers	Lieutenant General; John T. Myers	May 1987	June 1990	~3 years, 31 days	U.S. Army
9	Thurman D. Rodgers	Lieutenant General; Thurman D. Rodgers	June 1990	July 1991	~1 year, 30 days	U.S. Army
10	Alonzo E. Short Jr.	Lieutenant General; Alonzo E. Short Jr.	August 1991	July 1994	~2 years, 334 days	U.S. Army
11	Albert J. Edmonds	Lieutenant General; Albert J. Edmonds	July 1994	June 1997	~2 years, 335 days	U.S. Air Force
12	David J. Kelley	Lieutenant General; David J. Kelley	June 1997	June 2000	~3 years, 0 days	U.S. Army
13	Harry D. Raduege Jr.	Lieutenant General; Harry D. Raduege Jr.	June 2000	July 2005	~5 years, 30 days	U.S. Air Force
14	Charles E. Croom Jr.	Lieutenant General; Charles E. Croom Jr.	July 2005	July 22, 2008	~3 years, 21 days	U.S. Air Force
-	Elizabeth A. Hight	Rear Admiral; Elizabeth A. Hight; Acting	July 22, 2008	December 17, 2008	148 days	U.S. Navy
15	Carroll F. Pollett	Lieutenant General; Carroll F. Pollett	December 17, 2008	January 11, 2012	3 years, 25 days	U.S. Army
16	Ronnie D. Hawkins	Lieutenant General; Ronnie D. Hawkins	January 11, 2012	July 23, 2015	3 years, 193 days	U.S. Air Force
17	Alan R. Lynn	Lieutenant General; Alan R. Lynn	July 23, 2015	February 1, 2018	2 years, 193 days	U.S. Army
18	Nancy A. Norton	Vice Admiral; Nancy A. Norton	February 1, 2018	February 26, 2021	3 years, 25 days	U.S. Navy
16	Robert J. Skinner	Lieutenant General; Robert J. Skinner	February 26, 2021	October 4, 2024	3 years, 221 days	U.S. Air Force
17	Paul T. Stanton	Lieutenant General; Paul T. Stanton	October 4, 2024	Incumbent	2 years, 24 days	U.S. Army

== Military Unit Decorations ==
The unit awards below are issued to Headquarters, Defense Information Systems Agency and subordinate units unless otherwise noted.

Members of military-specific units (i.e., Army, Navy, Marine Corps, and Air Force) assigned or attached, even if they are under the operational control, are not eligible for the Joint Meritorious Unit Award (JMUA), but retain eligibility for unit awards from their respective military service department.

Members must have been permanently assigned or attached by official orders to the agency for 30 or more days during the designated award period. Service members individually assigned or attached (including temporary duty or temporary additional duty) status is determined by official orders that specify the agency as the duty unit. Some military services allow the “temporary-wear” of past unit citations when assigned to the organization. The JMUA is an exception to this rule and is not authorized for temporary wear.

Award streamer	Award	Dates	Notes
	Joint Meritorious Unit Award	1 Aug 83 – 31 Jul 85	White House Communications Agency only.
	Joint Meritorious Unit Award	1 Aug 85 – 31 Aug 89	White House Communications Agency only.
	Joint Meritorious Unit Award	1 Jan 89 – 28 Sep 94	Electromagnetic Compatibility Analysis Center (later redesignated as the Joint Spectrum Center) only.
	Joint Meritorious Unit Award	2 Aug 90 – 15 Mar 91	Headquarters and all subordinate units. DoD Washington Headquarters Services memorandum dated 17 April 1992, Awards Order Number 91-113.
	Joint Meritorious Unit Award	29 Jul 94 – 1 Jul 96	Headquarters and all subordinate units. DoD Washington Headquarters Services memorandum dated 9 August 1996, Awards Order Number 96-179.
	Joint Meritorious Unit Award	2 Jul 96 – 31 Dec 98	Headquarters and all subordinate units. DoD Washington Headquarters Services memorandum dated 26 April 1999, Awards Order Number 99-100.
	Joint Meritorious Unit Award	1 Jan 99 – 31 Jul 99	Headquarters and all subordinate units. DoD Washington Headquarters Services memorandum dated 13 March 2000, Awards Order Number 00-046.
	Joint Meritorious Unit Award	1 Jan 01 – 31 Jan 03	Revoked by OSD Deputy Chief Management Office and reissued with date range of 1 January 2002 – 31 December 2003.
	Joint Meritorious Unit Award	1 Jan 02 – 31 Dec 03	Headquarters and all subordinate units. OSD Memorandum from Director of Personnel dated 10 May 2005, Awards Order Number 05-088.
	Joint Meritorious Unit Award	11 Sep 01 - 31 Nov 01	Revoked 3 March 2003 by OSD Deputy Chief Management Office and reissued with date range of 11 September 2001 -31 December 2001.
	Joint Meritorious Unit Award	11 Sep 01 – 31 Dec 01	Headquarters, all subordinate units, and the Office of the Manager, National Communications Systems.
	Joint Meritorious Unit Award	1 Dec 08 – 1 Dec 11	Headquarters and all subordinate units. DoD Washington Headquarters Services memorandum dated 10 September 2012, Awards Order Number 12-177.
	Joint Meritorious Unit Award	1 Jun 14 – 1 Mar 17	Headquarters and all subordinate units. DoD Washington Headquarters Services memorandum dated 2 October 2017, Awards Order Number 17-272.
	Joint Meritorious Unit Award	1 Feb 18 – 31 Dec 20	Headquarters and all subordinate units. DoD Washington Headquarters Services memorandum dated 15 March 2021, Awards Order Number 21-089.

== See also ==
- Joint Directorate of Infrastructure Networks and Information Systems
- Software Defined Perimeter
