= William Hilsman =

William Hilsman may refer to:

- William Hilsman (politician), American politician in Missouri
- William J. Hilsman, United States Army general

== See also ==
- Bill Hillsman, American political consultant and advertising executive
