= Hilsman =

Hilsman is a surname. Notable people with the surname include:

- Hoyt Hilsman, American author, journalist, and political figure
- Roger_Hilsman (1919–2014), American soldier, government official, political scientist, and author
- William Hilsman (politician) (1900–1964), American politician
- William J. Hilsman
