= Hillsman =

Hillsman is a surname. Notable people with the surname include:

- Bill Hillsman (born 1953), American political consultant and advertising executive
- Don Hillsman II, American penciller and inker
- Quentin Hillsman (born 1970), American college basketball coach
- William Hilsman (politician), American politician
