= Illia Vitiuk =

- Вітюк Ілля Анатолійович
- Born: Illia Anatolijovych Vitiuk
- Military career
- Allegiance: Ukraine
- Branch: Ukrainian Ground Forces
- Rank: Brigadier general
- Commands: Security Service of Ukraine
- Conflicts: 2022 Russian invasion of Ukraine

Illia Vitiuk (Ukrainian: Ілля Вітюк) is a Ukrainian serviceman, intelligence officer, and Brigadier General of the Security Service of Ukraine (SBU). He served as Head of the Department of Counterintelligence Protection of State Interests in the Sphere of Information Security from 30 November 2021 to 1 May 2024.

== Biography ==
A native of Kyiv. In 2004, he began military service in the state security agencies. In 2009, he graduated with honours from the SBU National Academy with a degree in Law. He subsequently obtained a second higher education degree in International Economics and graduated from Kyiv National Economic University named after Vadym Hetman.

=== Career ===
During his service, he held operational and managerial positions in regional directorates and at the SBU Central Office.

From 1 August 2021, he served as acting Head, and on 30 November 2021 became Head, of the SBU Department of Counterintelligence Protection of State Interests in the Sphere of Information Security.

Under Vitiuk's leadership, the Department's counterintelligence officers carried out the following cyber operations:

- Blocking cyberattacks by Russian intelligence services against critical infrastructure facilities and military systems, including Kropyva, Delta, the Kyivstar telecommunications operator, energy facilities, and others.
- Collecting evidence against members of the Russian FSB hacker unit Gamaredon (Armageddon) for cyberattacks on Ukrainian civilian infrastructure.
- Detaining members of international hacker groups jointly with partner intelligence services.

According to the SBU, under Vitiuk's leadership, the SBU Cybersecurity Department (DKIB) "repelled thousands of cyberattacks".

At the start of the full-scale invasion, Vitiuk headed one of the operational combat groups involved in the liberation of Kyiv Region from Russian forces.

Under Vitiuk's leadership, a combat unit was established on the basis of the DKIB, comprising sniper teams and units that use unmanned aerial vehicles to destroy not only enemy personnel and equipment but also their electronic warfare (EW) and electronic intelligence (EI) assets.

According to the SBU, with Vitiuk's involvement, work was established to document and neutralise enemy sabotage and reconnaissance groups, counter information and psychological operations (IPSO), and collect and analyse intelligence data. A Telegram bot, "stop_russian_war_bot", was also developed, through which Ukrainian servicemen received information about the movement of enemy troops. This enabled the Defence Forces to destroy enemy equipment and personnel, as well as "several Russian generals".

On 1 May 2024, Vitiuk was dismissed from the position of Head of the SBU Cybersecurity Department (Head of the Department of Counterintelligence Protection of State Interests in the Sphere of Information Security).

According to the SBU, during 2024–2025, Vitiuk served in rotations as part of operational combat groups in the combat zone in Sumy, Kherson, Zaporizhzhia, Mykolaiv, and Donetsk Regions, and took part in the Kursk campaign.

== Sports ==
- Prize-winner in republican and international Greco-Roman wrestling and mixed martial arts competitions.
- Ukrainian champion and silver medallist at the World Combat Sambo Championship.
- Master of Sport of Ukraine of international class.

== Investigations ==
The beginning of April 2024 Journalists from Slidstvo.Info published investigation that Vitiuk’s family owns an apartment the market value of which may exceed UAH 20 million.

In 2022, Vitiuk's wife, Yuliia Vitiuk, registered a sole proprietorship providing legal services. Whereas journalists from Slidstvo.Info as if were unable to find public information about the business activities of this proprietorship.

On 16 April 2024, the National Agency on Corruption Prevention (NACP) began a lifestyle check of Vitiuk based on journalistic investigations. On 20 September 2024, the NACP was unable to identify discrepancies between Vitiuk's declared and actual standard of living.

=== NABU suspicion and the conflict between the SBU and NABU ===
In early September 2025, NABU and SAP officers declared SBU Brigadier General I. Vitiuk a suspect in a criminal investigation. The SBU viewed these actions as a response to the Service’s detention of several NABU employees at the end of July 2025. According to the SBU, the allegations against Vitiuk made by NABU and SAP constituted retaliation for the SBU exposing several Bureau employees for committing crimes.

== Military rank ==
- Brigadier General (25 March 2024)

== Awards and honours ==
General Vitiuk received a number of awards for exceptional service, including medals from top political and military leadership and governmental awards.

- State Award - Order of Bohdan Khmelnytsky, 3rd class
- Presidential Distinction "For Participation in the Anti-Terrorist Operation" (for conscientious performance of official duties in the area of the anti-terrorist operation)
- SBU Awards: honorary medals "For Valour", "For Courage", "Distinction of the Security Service of Ukraine"
- Defence Intelligence of Ukraine Award "Personal firearm" (for valour and selflessness demonstrated in the performance of official duties)

== Interviews and speeches ==
- NPR. Meet the man leading the front-line effort in Ukraine's cyber war with Russia
- Illia Vitiuk: Ukraine in Cyberspace: One Year After
- Reuters. Exclusive: Russian hackers were inside Ukraine telecoms giant for months
- BBC. Ukrainewar: Cyber-teams fight a high-tech war on front lines
- AFCEA. Ukraine's Fusion of Cyber and Kinetic Warfare: Illia Vitiuk's Stand Against Russian Cyber Operations
- TheRecordMedia. Exclusive: How a defend-forward operation gave Ukraine’s SBU an edge over Russia
- StrongerTogether. The US-Ukrainian Cyber Partnership
- Ukraine Calls on Industry for Expertise in the Cyber War with Russia
