= Defense Red Switch Network =

Dedicated secure telephone network for U.S. Armed Forces

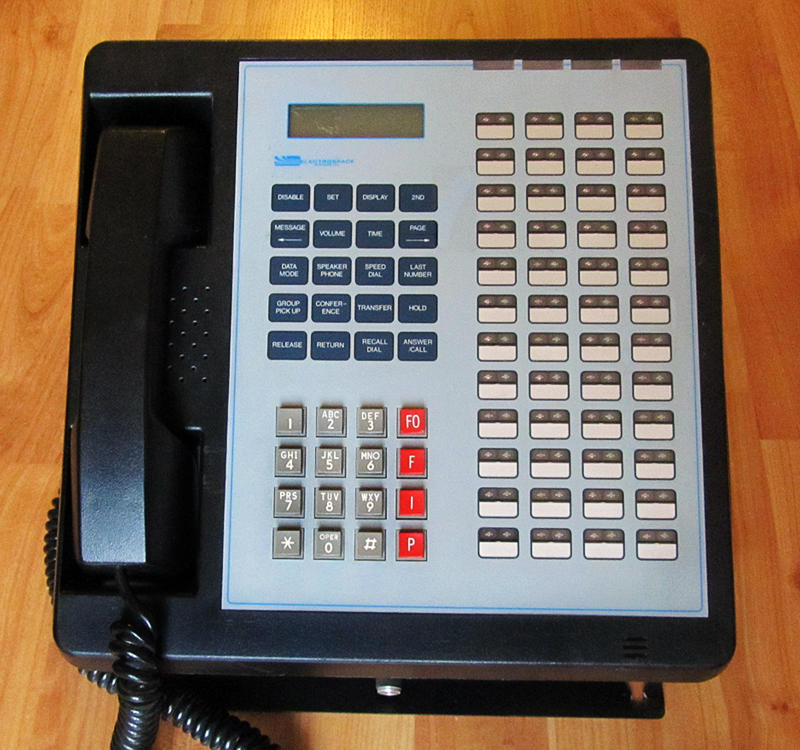
A Multi Line Phone (MLP-1A), made by Electrospace Systems, which was part of the Defense Red Switch Network since 1983. The phone has the four extra MLPP buttons and 48 programmable buttons for access to both secure and nonsecure lines.

The Defense Red Switch Network (DRSN) is a dedicated telephone network which provides global secure communication services for the command and control structure of the United States Armed Forces. The network is maintained by the Defense Information Systems Agency (DISA) and is secured for communications up to the level of Top Secret SCI.

The DRSN provides multilevel secure voice and voice-conferencing capabilities to the National Command Authority (NCA, being the President and the Secretary of Defense of the United States), the Joint Chiefs of Staff, the National Military Command Center (NMCC), Combatant Commanders and their command centers, warfighters, other DoD agencies, government departments, and NATO allies.

Department of Defense and federal government agencies can get access to the network with approval of the Joint Staff. Upon approval by the Joint Staff, DISA will work with the customer and the appropriate military department to arrange the service.

The Defense Red Switch Network consists of four major subsystems: the Switching Subsystem, the Transmission Subsystem, the Timing and Synchronization Subsystem, and the Network Management Subsystem. The Switching Subsystem uses both RED and BLACK switches to provide an integrated RED/BLACK service. End users are provided with a single telephone instrument with which they can access both secure and non-secure networks.

The DRSN carried around 15,000 calls per day prior to September 11, 2001. DRSN usage subsequently peaked at 45,000 calls per day and by mid-2003 was running at around 25,000 calls per day. In that period the Defense Red Switch Network was expanded to support 18 additional US Federal Homeland Defense initiatives.

Nowadays, this network is also called the Multilevel Secure Voice service. It's the core of the Global Secure Voice System (GSVS) during peacetime, crisis and time of conventional war, by hosting national-level conferencing and connectivity requirements and providing interoperability with both tactical and strategic communication networks.

== See also ==
- Defense Switched Network (DSN)
- Automatic Secure Voice Communications Network (AUTOSEVOCOM)
