= General Murphy =

General Murphy may refer to:

- Dennis J. Murphy (born 1932), U.S. Marine Corps major general
- Sean L. Murphy (fl. 1980s–2020s), U.S. Air Force major general
- Thomas E. Murphy (general) (fl. 1980s–2020s), U.S. Air Force major general
- W. R. E. Murphy (1890–1975), Irish National Army major general

== See also ==
- Attorney General Murphy (disambiguation)
