= Paul Fredenburgh =

U.S. Army general

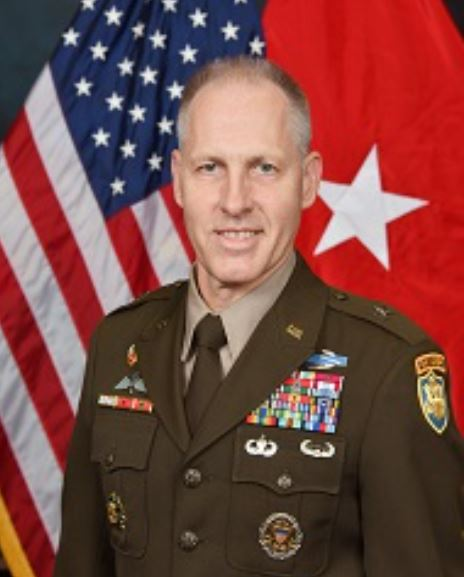
- Military career
- Allegiance: United States
- Branch: United States Army
- Rank: Brigadier General
- Commands: Dwight D. Eisenhower School for National Security and Resource Strategy

Paul H. Fredenburgh III is a retired United States Army brigadier general who is the executive vice president of AFCEA. In the Army, he last served as the Deputy Commander of the Joint Force Headquarters-Department of Defense Information Network from July 2019 to July 2021.

Military offices
Preceded by Thomas A. Gorry	Commandant of the Dwight D. Eisenhower School for National Security and Resource Strategy; 201?–2017	Succeeded by John M. Jansen
Preceded by Kathleen Creighton	Director, Command, Control, Communications, and Cyber of the United States Indo-Pacific Command; 2017–2019	Succeeded by Robert J. Skinner
Preceded by Kathleen Creighton	Deputy Commander of the Joint Force Headquarters-Department of Defense Information Network; 2019–2021	Succeeded by William Chase III
