= Kathleen Creighton =

U.S. Navy admiral

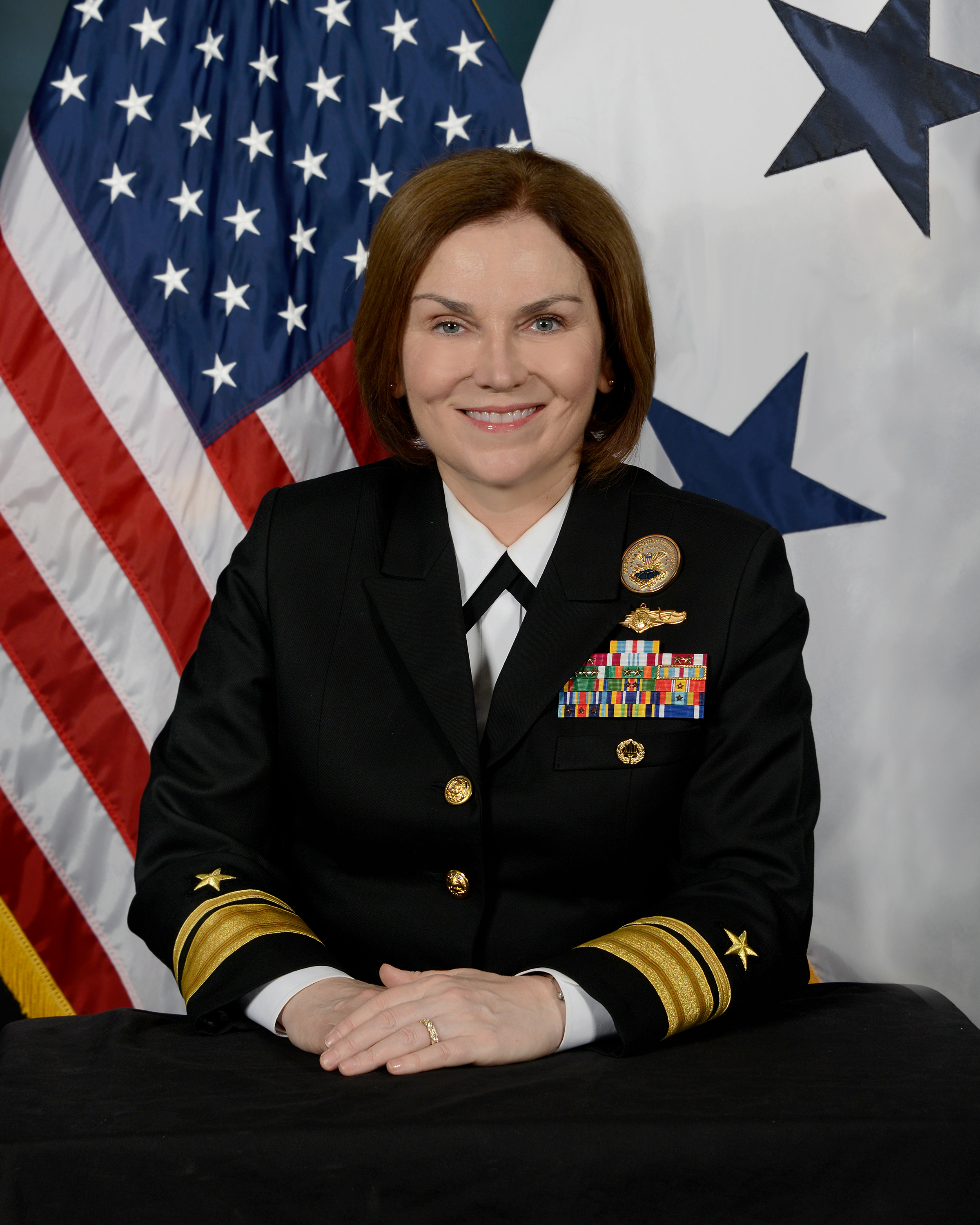
- Born: Kathleen Marie Traynor; 1966 (age 59–60)
- Military career
- Allegiance: United States
- Branch: United States Navy
- Service years: 1988–2021
- Rank: Rear Admiral
- Commands: Naval Computer and Telecommunications Station Sicily; Naval Computer and Telecommunications Station Bahrain
- Awards: Defense Superior Service Medal (2); Legion of Merit (3)

Kathleen Marie Creighton (born 1966) is a United States Navy rear admiral who most recently served as the Director of Warfare Integration of the United States Navy from September 18, 2020, to August 21, 2021. Previously, she served as the Deputy Commander of the Joint Force Headquarters–Department of Defense Information Networks from August 2017 to August 2019.

Raised in Ridgefield, Connecticut, Creighton attended Ridgefield High School. She graduated from the University of Notre Dame in 1988 with a Bachelor of Business Administration degree and was commissioned through the NROTC program. Creighton later earned an M.S. degree in information technology management from the Naval Postgraduate School in 1997.

== Personal ==
Kathleen Traynor married Craig Calderwood Creighton on October 21, 1989, in Ridgefield, Connecticut. Her husband was a naval surface warfare officer who retired from active duty as a lieutenant commander.

Military offices
Preceded by Nancy A. Norton	Director, Command, Control, Communications, and Cyber of the United States Pacific Command; 2015–2017	Succeeded by Paul H. Fredenburgh III
Preceded by Robert J. Skinner	Deputy Commander of the Joint Force Headquarters–Department of Defense Information Networks; 2017–2019	Succeeded by Paul H. Fredenburgh III
Preceded by Danelle Barrett	Navy Cyber Security Division Director of the Office of the Chief of Naval Operations; 2019–2020	Succeeded by Susan BryerJoyner
Preceded by Steve Parode	Director of Warfare Integration of the United States Navy; 2020–2021	Succeeded by John A. Okon
