= Paul T. Stanton =

U.S. Army general officer

Lieutenant General Paul T. Stanton
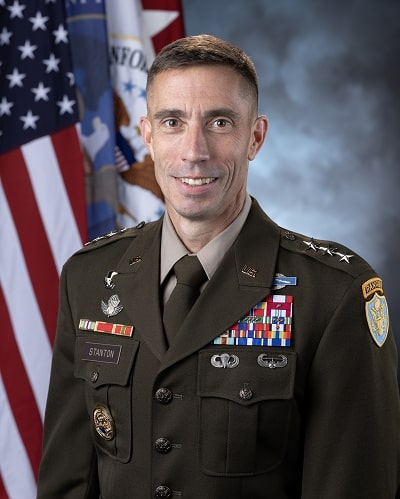
- Official portrait, 2024
- Born: c. 1973 (age 52–53)
- Military career
- Allegiance: United States
- Branch: United States Army
- Service years: 1995–present
- Rank: Lieutenant General
- Commands: Defense Information Systems Agency; Department of Defense Cyber Defense Command; Cyber Center of Excellence; Fort Eisenhower; U.S. Army Cyber Protection Brigade; B Company, 1-502nd Infantry
- Awards: Army Distinguished Service Medal; Defense Superior Service Medal; Legion of Merit (2); Bronze Star Medal

Paul T. Stanton (born c. 1973) is a United States Army lieutenant general who has served as the director of the Defense Information Systems Agency (DISA) and commander of the Department of Defense Cyber Defense Command (previously Joint Force Headquarters – Department of Defense Information Network (JFHQ-DoDIN) until May 2025) since 4 October 2024. He previously served as the commanding general of the Cyber Center of Excellence and Fort Eisenhower from 2021 to 2024. He also served as the deputy commanding general (operations) of the United States Army Cyber Command.

In June 2024, Stanton was nominated for promotion to lieutenant general and assignment as director of DISA and commander of JFHQ-DoDIN.

He graduated from the U.S. Military Academy at West Point in 1995 and commissioned into the infantry but later transitioned to the cyber branch in 2015.

Military offices
Preceded by Craig A. Clapperton	Deputy Director of Operations of the United States Cyber Command; 2017–2020	Succeeded by ???
Preceded by Robin L. Fontes	Deputy Commanding General (Operations) of the United States Army Cyber Command; 2020–2021	Succeeded by Neil S. Hersey
Preceded by Neil S. Hersey	Commanding General of the Cyber Center of Excellence and Fort Eisenhower; 2021–2024	Succeeded by Ryan M. Janovic
Preceded by Robert J. Skinner	Director of the Defense Information Systems Agency and Commander of Department of Defense Cyber Defense Command; 2024–present	Incumbent
