= Attorney General Murphy =

Attorney General Murphy may refer to:

- Edward Sullivan Murphy (1880–1945), Attorney General for Northern Ireland
- Frank Murphy (1890–1949), United States Attorney General
- George W. Murphy (1841–1920), Attorney General of Arkansas
- John W. Murphy (Arizona politician) (1874–1947), Attorney General of Arizona
- Lionel Murphy (1922–1986), Attorney-General of Australia
- Maurice J. Murphy Jr. (1927–2002), New Hampshire Attorney General
- Mike Murphy (New Brunswick politician) (born 1958), Attorney General of New Brunswick
- Robert C. Murphy (judge) (1926–2000), Attorney General of Maryland

== See also ==
- Alonzo Morphy (1798–1856), Attorney General of Louisiana
- General Murphy (disambiguation)
