= Robert J. Skinner =

Air Force lieutenant general

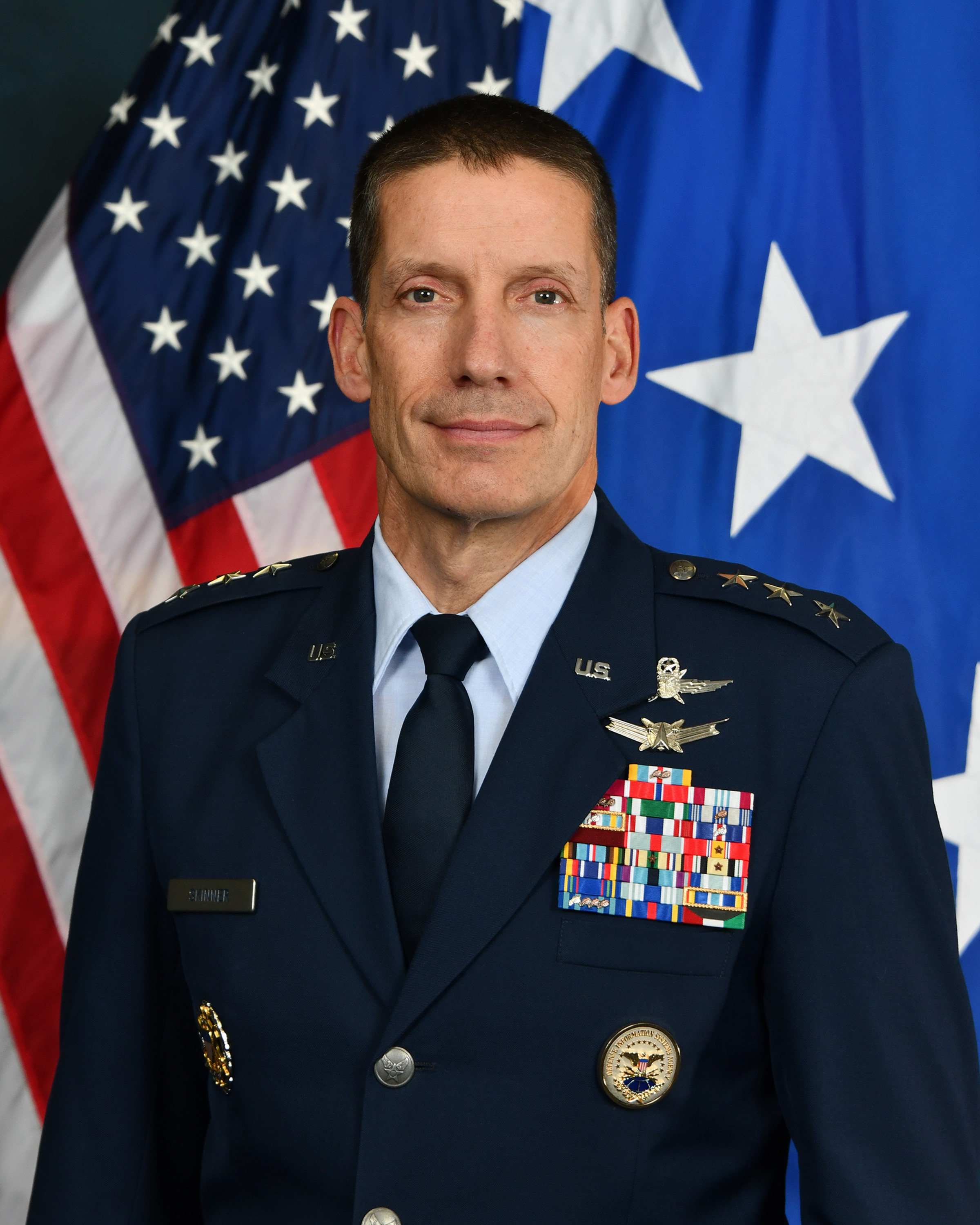
- Military career
- Allegiance: United States
- Branch: United States Air Force
- Service years: 1984–2024
- Rank: Lieutenant General
- Commands: Defense Information Systems Agency; Twenty-Fourth Air Force; 688th Information Operations Wing; 50th Network Operations Group; 27th Communications Squadron; Info Systems Flight, 100th Air Refueling Wing
- Conflicts: Gulf War; Iraq War
- Awards: Defense Superior Service Medal (3); Legion of Merit (2); Bronze Star Medal

Robert J. Skinner is a retired United States Air Force lieutenant general who served as the director of the Defense Information Systems Agency from 2021 to 2024. Before, he directed Command, Control, Communications, and Cyber of the United States Indo-Pacific Command. Prior to that, he was the commander of the Twenty-Fourth Air Force. He was promoted to lieutenant general and appointed as the director of the Defense Information Systems Agency in 2021, replacing Vice Admiral Nancy A. Norton.

== Awards and decorations ==
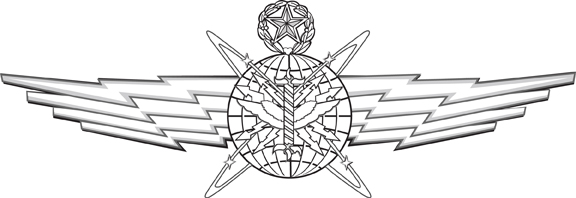
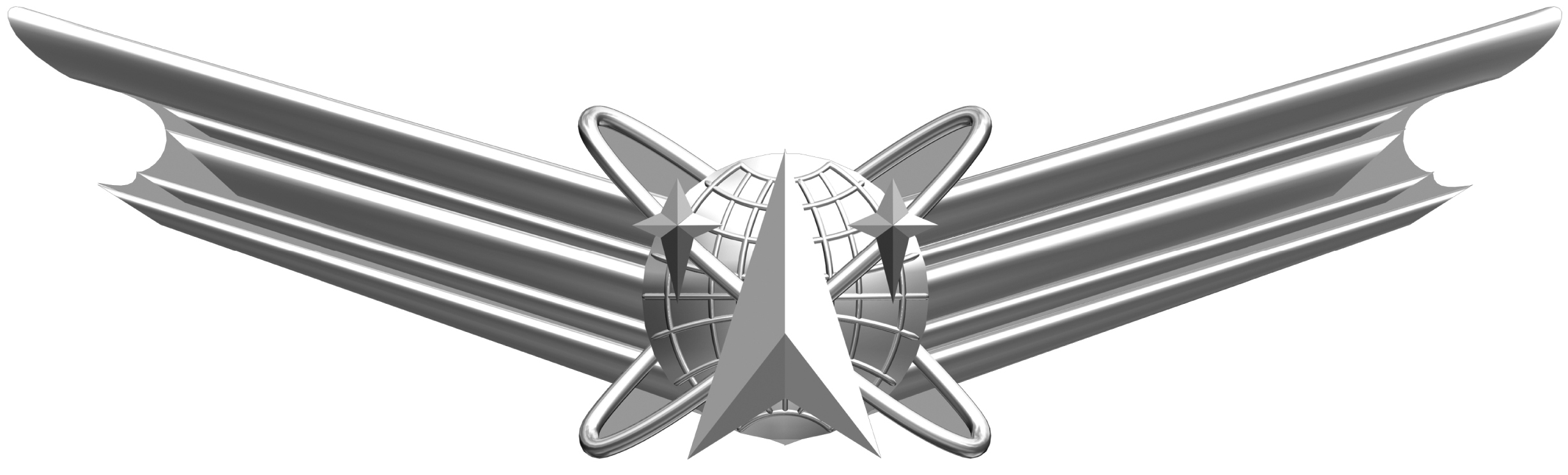
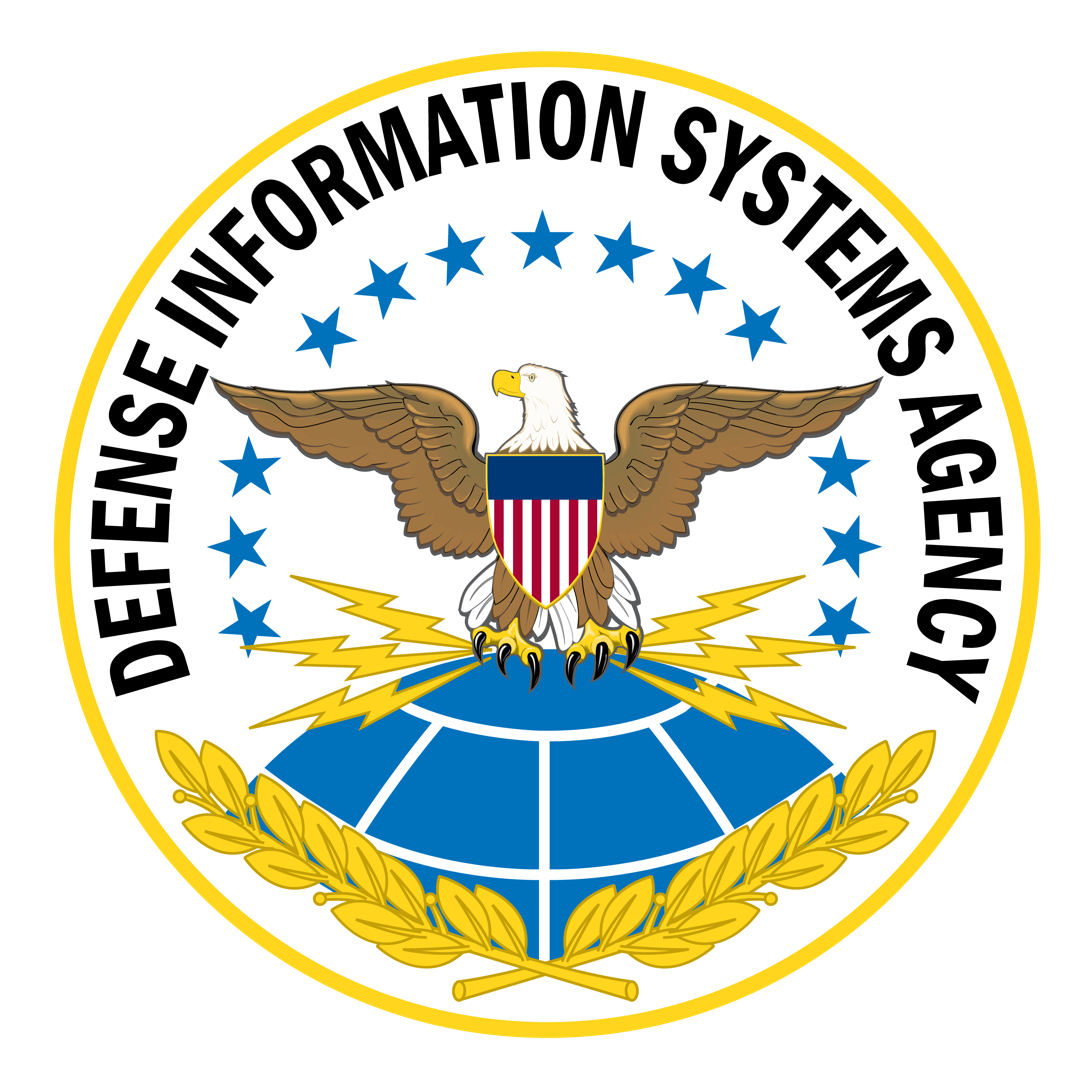
Master Cyberspace Operator Badge
Basic Space Operations Badge
Defense Information Systems Agency Badge
Joint Chiefs of Staff Badge

Defense Superior Service Medal with two bronze oak leaf clusters
Legion of Merit with oak leaf cluster
Bronze Star Medal
Defense Meritorious Service Medal
Meritorious Service Medal with three oak leaf clusters
Navy Commendation Medal
Air Force Achievement Medal with oak leaf cluster
Joint Meritorious Unit Award with silver oak leaf cluster
Air Force Meritorious Unit Award
Outstanding Unit Award with silver oak leaf cluster
Navy Good Conduct Medal
Air Force Recognition Ribbon
National Defense Service Medal with one bronze service star
Armed Forces Expeditionary Medal
Southwest Asia Service Medal with service star
Iraq Campaign Medal with service star
Global War on Terrorism Service Medal
Humanitarian Service Medal
Air and Space Campaign Medal
Nuclear Deterrence Operations Service Medal
Air Force Overseas Long Tour Service Ribbon
Air Force Expeditionary Service Ribbon with gold frame
Air Force Longevity Service Award with one silver and three bronze oak leaf clusters
Air Force Training Ribbon
Kuwait Liberation Medal (Kuwait)

== Effective dates of promotions ==
Rank	Date
Second Lieutenant	November 7, 1989
First Lieutenant	November 7, 1991
Captain	November 7, 1993
Major	July 1, 1999
Lieutenant Colonel	March 1, 2002
Colonel	March 1, 2006
Brigadier General	July 26, 2013
Major General	May 2, 2017
Lieutenant General	February 25, 2021

Military offices
New office	Commander of the 688th Information Operations Wing; 2009–2013	Succeeded by Paul A. Welch
Preceded by B. Edwin Wilson	Deputy Commander of the Air Forces Cyber; 2013–2014	Succeeded by Thomas E. Murphy
Preceded by ???	Deputy Commander of the Joint Force Headquarters Department of Defense Information Networks; 2015–2017	Succeeded by Kathleen Creighton
Preceded by David D. Thompson as Vice Commander of the Air Force Space Command	Deputy Commander of the Air Force Space Command; 2017–2018	Succeeded by John E. Shaw
Preceded by Christopher P. Weggeman	Commander of the Twenty-Fourth Air Force; 2018–2019	Unit inactivated
Preceded by Paul H. Fredenburgh III	Director, Command, Control, Communications, and Cyber of the United States Indo-Pacific Command; 2019–2021	Succeeded by Jacqueline D. Brown
Preceded by Nancy A. Norton	Director of the Defense Information Systems Agency; 2021–2024	Succeeded by Paul T. Stanton
