= John M. Jansen =

U.S. Marine Corps general

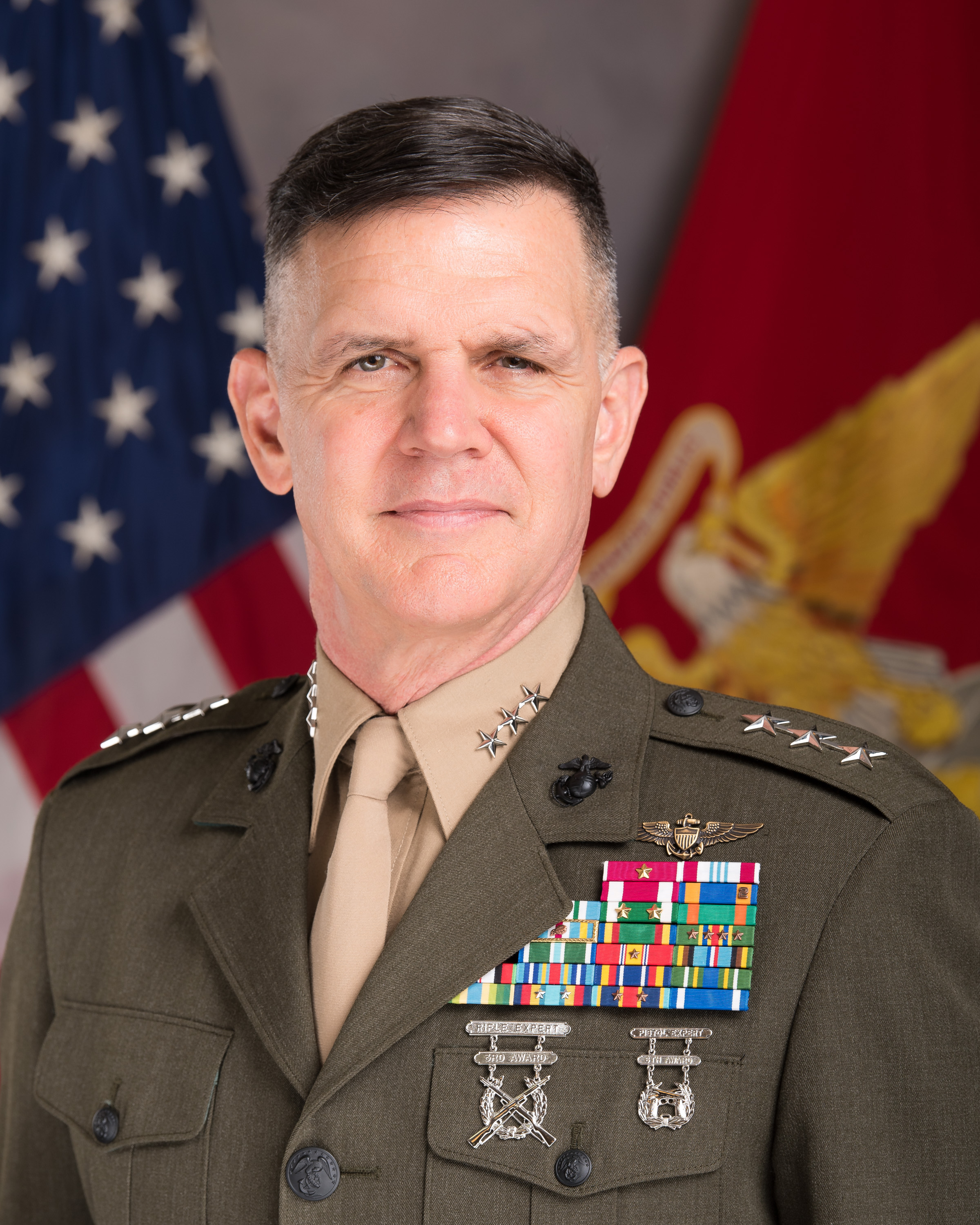
- Military career
- Allegiance: United States
- Branch: United States Marine Corps
- Service years: 1986–2021
- Rank: Lieutenant General
- Commands: Dwight D. Eisenhower School for National Security and Resource Strategy; 3rd Marine Expeditionary Brigade; Marine Aircraft Group 11; VMFA-251
- Conflicts: Southern Iraq; War in Afghanistan; War in Afghanistan; War in Iraq
- Awards: Distinguished Service Medal; Defense Superior Service Medal; Legion of Merit (2); Defense Meritorious Service Medal; Meritorious Service Medal; Air Medal-Strike Flight Medal

John M. Jansen is a retired United States Marine Corps lieutenant general who last served as the Deputy Commandant for Programs and Resources. He previously served as the chairman of the Board of Directors, Marine Corps Community Services and was the 44th Commandant (College President) of the Eisenhower School for National Security and Resource Strategy. He commanded 3rd Marine Expeditionary Brigade, Marine Aircraft Group 11, and Marine Fighter Attack Squadron 251. He was a Marine fighter pilot flying the F/A-18 Hornet in which he had almost 3,000 hours and in which he made over 480 arrested carrier landings. He was the Marine Tailhooker of the Year Award recipient in 2006. For more than three decades, Jansen led Marines in first-response, security and high-risk combat operations around the globe to include nine overseas deployments.

He served in four separate combat operations in Iraq and Afghanistan, as well as NATO support operations flying combat contingency missions over Bosnia/Herzegovina. He spent nearly two years at sea including three deployments aboard aircraft carriers and time aboard amphibious assault ships. He spent seven additional years stationed abroad in Japan, Germany, and Italy. Jansen served 35 years, from 1986 until 2021.

He received a bachelor of science in finance from Kelley School of Business at Indiana University Bloomington.

Military offices
| Preceded by ??? | Assistant Deputy Commandant for Programs and Resources of the United States Marine Corps; 2013–2015 | Succeeded by Michael E. Langley |
| Preceded by Paul J. Kennedy | Deputy Commanding General of the III Marine Expeditionary Force and Commanding General of the 3rd Marine Expeditionary Brigade; 2015–2017 | Succeeded by Christopher A. McPhillips |
| Preceded by Paul H. Fredenburgh III | Commandant of the Dwight D. Eisenhower School for National Security and Resource Strategy; 2017–2018 | Succeeded by Kyle W. Robinson |
| Preceded by Gary L. Thomas | Deputy Commandant for Programs and Resources of the United States Marine Corps; 2018–2021 | Succeeded by Christopher J. Mahoney |
