= Gordon T. Gould =

United States Air Force general (1916–1979)

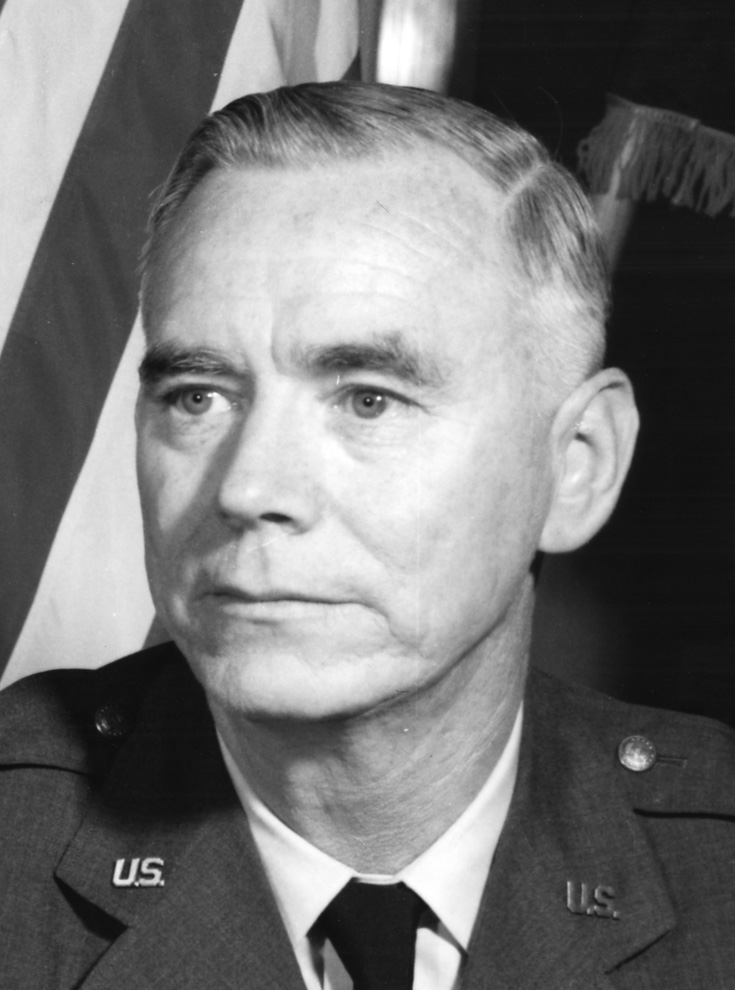
- Gould in 1972
- Born: 17 January 1916; Mobile, Alabama, US
- Died: 7 August 1979 (aged 63) Bethesda, Maryland, US
- Buried: Arlington National Cemetery
- Service: United States Army; United States Army Air Forces; United States Air Force
- Service years: 1941–1974
- Rank: Lieutenant General
- Commands: Communications Department, Army Air Forces Radar School; Armament Laboratory, Air Research and Development Command; Radar and Communications Division, Air Research and Development Command; Command and Control Systems Division, Air Research and Development Command; Communications–Electronics Division, Strategic Air Command; Director, Command Control and Communications, Headquarters U.S. Air Force; Defense Communications Agency
- Conflicts: World War II; Occupation of Japan
- Awards: Air Force Distinguished Service Medal (3); Legion of Merit (3); Army Commendation Medal
- Education: United States Military Academy; Massachusetts Institute of Technology; Air War College
- Spouse: Willa Lois Sameth (m. 1941–1979)
- Children: 3
- Other work: Manager, federal systems division, IBM

Gordon Thomas Gould Jr. (17 January 1916 – 7 August 1979) was a career officer in the U.S. military. A veteran of the United States Army, United States Army Air Forces, and United States Air Force, he served from 1941 to 1974 and attained the rank of lieutenant general. Gould served in World War II and the post-war Occupation of Japan, his awards and decorations included three awards of the Air Force Distinguished Service Medal, three awards of the Legion of Merit, and the Army Commendation Medal.

A native of Mobile, Alabama and a 1941 graduate of the United States Military Academy, Gould served with the army and the army air forces during the Second World War, and specialized in communications and electronics. Post-war postings with the United States Air Force included developing drone guidance and instrumentation equipment and ground support equipment for atomic bomb tests at Enewetak Atoll. He received a master's degree from the Massachusetts Institute of Technology in 1950 and graduated from the Air War College in 1954.

Gould was director of the Defense Communications Agency from 1971 until retiring in 1974. After leaving the Air Force, Gould was employed as manager of the federal systems division at IBM. He died at Bethesda Naval Hospital on 7 August 1979 and was interred at Arlington National Cemetery.

== Early life ==
Gould was born in Mobile, Alabama on 17 January 1916, a son of Gordon T. Gould Sr. and Minerva "Minnie" (Gaston) Gould. He was raised and educated in Mobile and was a 1933 graduate of Murphy High School. After high school, Gould was employed by a Jackson, Alabama funeral home, then attended the West Point Preparatory School at Fort McPherson, Georgia.

In 1937, Gould received an appointment to the United States Military Academy in West Point, New York from US Representative Frank W. Boykin. He graduated in 1941 ranked 59th of 424 and received his commission as a second lieutenant in the Signal Corps.

== Start of career ==
After receiving his commission, Gould attended the Signal Officer General Course at Fort Monmouth, New Jersey. This was followed by attendance at a Harvard University electronics course and a radar course at the Massachusetts Institute of Technology. He was then assigned as head of the communications department at the United States Army Air Forces Radar School, which was located at Drew Field, Florida. He was subsequently assigned as communication officer for the III Fighter Command, which was also based at Drew Field.

In June 1944, Gould was assigned to World War II duty in the China Burma India theater as communications officer for the 312th Fighter Wing. In this role, his responsibilities included establishing the communications and control systems for support of B-29 aircraft operations. In August 1945, Gould was posted to the Army Air Forces China Theater Headquarters, where he was assigned as staff communications officer. Following the Surrender of Japan in August 1945, he directed the re-establishment of airways and communications through the portions of China that had been under wartime Japanese occupation.

== Continued career ==
Gould returned to the United States in April 1946 and was assigned as assistant chief of staff for intelligence for the Airways and Air Communications Service headquarters at Langley Field, Virginia, which was followed by assignment as chief of staff. In May 1948, Gould began attendance at the Massachusetts Institute of Technology, from which he graduated in 1950 with a Master of Science degree in electrical engineering. After graduation, he was assigned to the Wright Air Development Center (WADC) as officer in charge of developing drone guidance and instrumentation equipment, as well as the ground support equipment needed for atomic bomb tests at Enewetak Atoll. Gould later served at the WADC as assistant chief and later chief of its Armament Laboratory.

In August 1953, Gould began attendance at the Air War College, from which he graduated in July 1954. After his war college graduation, Gould was assigned as chief of the Radar and Communications Division at the Air Research and Development Command (ARDC) headquarters in Baltimore. Following a reorganization of the ARDC, he was assigned as assistant deputy commander for Weapon Systems and Electronics, and he was later assigned as chief of the Command and Control Systems Division. In July 1960, Gould was posted to the Strategic Air Command headquarters at Offutt Air Force Base, Nebraska, where he was assigned as chief of the Communications and Electronics Division.

== Later career ==
In November 1964, Gould was appointed deputy commander of the Air Force Communications Service. In July 1965, he became the director of Command Control and Communications at the U.S. Air Force headquarters. In September 1971, he was assigned as director of the Defense Communications Agency. He served in this position until retiring from the military in August 1974. Gould's awards included the Air Force Distinguished Service Medal with two oak leaf clusters, the Legion of Merit with two oak leaf clusters, and the Army Commendation Medal. In addition, he received the Order of Yun Hui (Special Breast) from the Republic of China in recognition of his Second World War service.

Gould was a fellow of the Institute of Electrical and Electronics Engineers and a fellow of the American Association for the Advancement of Science. In addition, he was a member of the Sigma Xi scientific research honor society. Gould also served as national vice president of the Armed Forces Communications and Electronics Association. After retiring from the Air Force, Gould worked as manager of IBM's federal systems division. He died at Bethesda Naval Hospital on 7 August 1979 and was interred at Arlington National Cemetery. In 1983, AFCEA created the Gordon T. Gould Jr. Award at the United States Air Force Academy. The Gould Award is presented to top cadets to recognize excellence in electronics and communications. Another AFCEA award named for Gould is presented annually to the members who produce the best classified paper on a communications or electronics topic.
