= Gary L. Thomas (general) =

US Marine Corps general

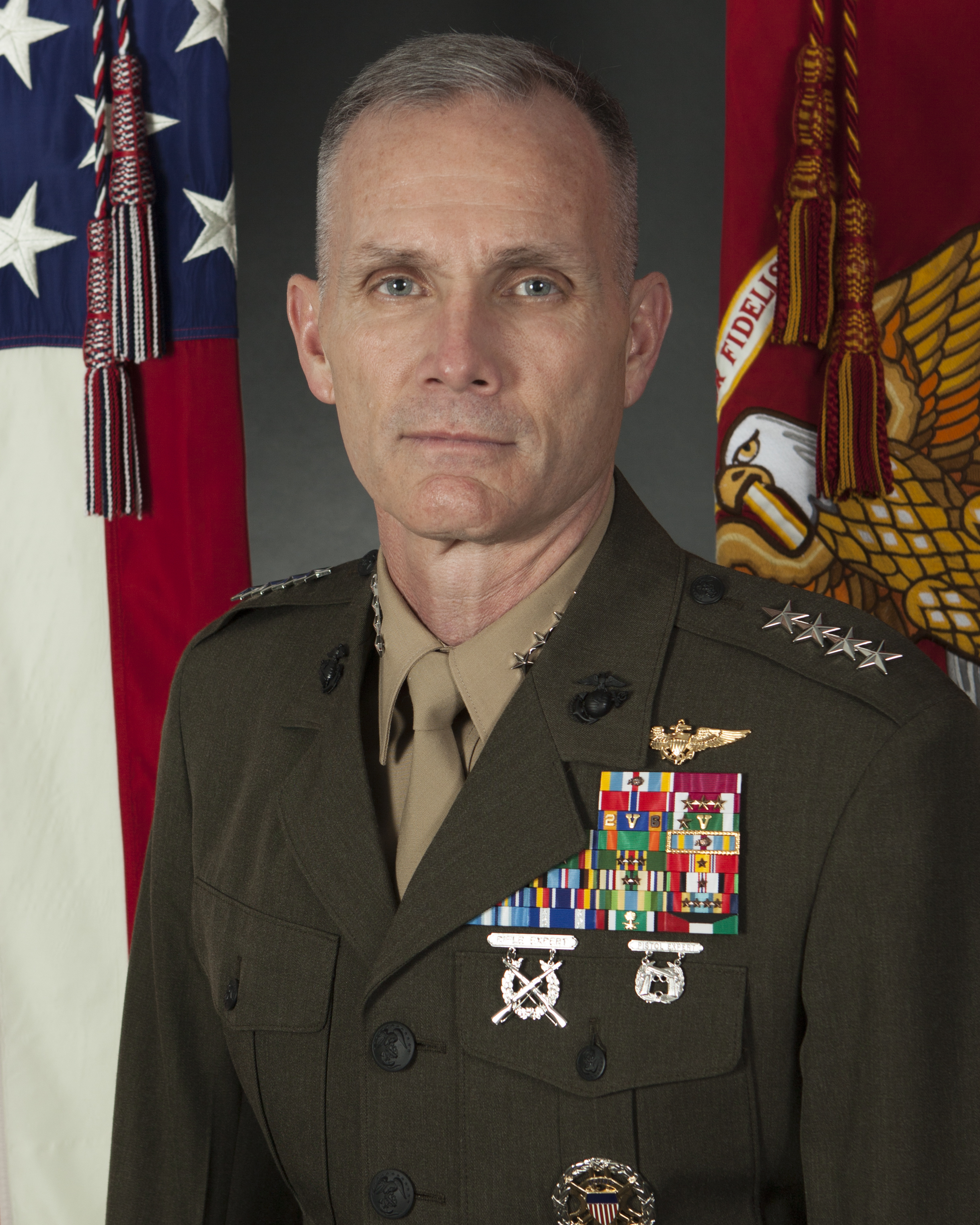
- General Gary L. Thomas
- Born: 1962 (age 63–64); Austin, Texas, U.S.
- Military career
- Allegiance: United States
- Branch: United States Marine Corps
- Service years: 1984–2021
- Rank: General
- Nickname: "Lurch"
- Commands: Assistant Commandant of the Marine Corps; 2nd Marine Aircraft Wing; Marine Aviation Weapons and Tactics Squadron One; VMFA-323
- Conflicts: Gulf War; War in Afghanistan
- Awards: Defense Superior Service Medal (2); Legion of Merit; Bronze Star Medal

Gary Lee Thomas (born 1962) is a retired United States Marine Corps four-star general. He was most recently the 35th Assistant Commandant of the Marine Corps. Gen Thomas is a naval aviator who flew the McDonnell Douglas F/A-18 Hornet and participated in combat operations during the Gulf War, the 2003 invasion of Iraq, and the War in Afghanistan. He has commanded at the squadron and Wing level and also led Marine Corps aviation's weapons school. Thomas is a graduate of the University of Texas at Austin and National Defense University.

== Biography ==
=== Early years ===
Thomas graduated from the University of Texas at Austin in 1984 with a bachelor's degree in computer science and was commissioned in the United States Marine Corps as a Second Lieutenant.

=== Military career ===
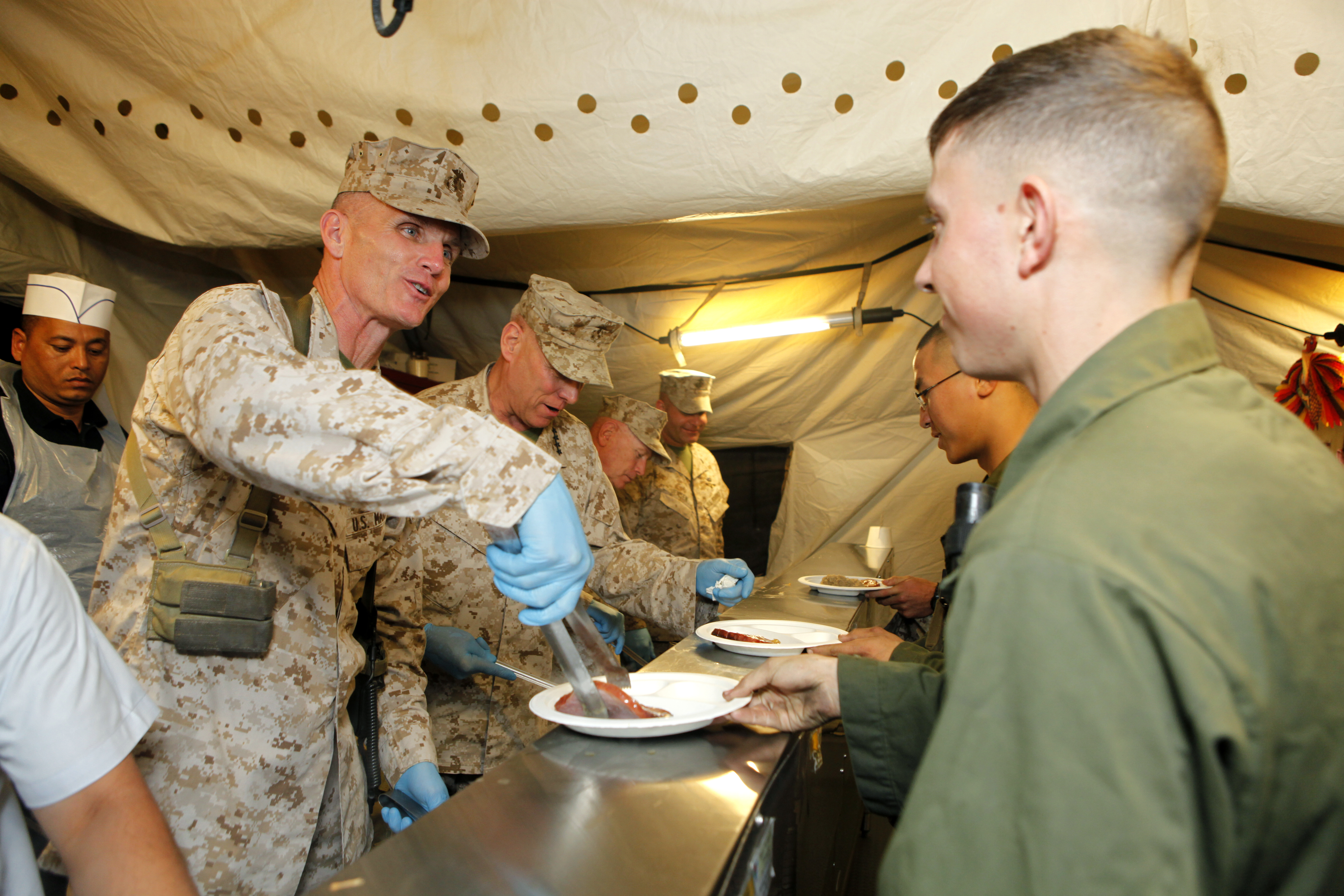
Brigadier General Thomas serves dinner to Marines at Camp Bastion, November 28, 2013.

ol Thomas took command of VMFA-323 on October 27, 2001, at Marine Corps Air Station Miramar. The squadron deployed as the lone Marine fighter squadron on board the USS Constellation (CV-64) in November 2002. During this deployment, the squadron supported combat operations during the 2003 invasion of Iraq. Thomas turned over command of the squadron on June 13, 2003. Following his command tour, he attended National Defense University and graduated with an M.S. in National Security Strategy in June 2004.

As a Colonel, he commanded Marine Aviation Weapons and Tactics Squadron One (MAWTS-1). As a Brigadier General, he served as the Assistant Deputy Commandant for Aviation, and later as the Assistant Wing Commander of the 2nd Marine Aircraft Wing He was the Commanding General of 2d Marine Aircraft Wing (Forward) in Afghanistan from February to December 2013. He later served as the Commanding General of 2d Marine Aircraft Wing at Marine Corps Air Station Cherry Point, North Carolina.

On June 21, 2018, LtGen Thomas was nominated for appointment to the rank of General and to serve as the Assistant Commandant of the Marine Corps. Thomas was the 35th Assistant Commandant of the Marine Corps.

He retired from active duty at the end of his term as assistant commandant, and his retirement ceremony was held on October 15, 2021.

== Awards and decorations ==
Thomas' decorations and medals include:

Naval Aviator Badge
Defense Superior Service Medal with one bronze oak leaf cluster		Legion of Merit	Bronze Star Medal
Meritorious Service Medal with three gold award stars	Air Medal with Combat "V", two gold award numerals and bronze Strike/Flight numeral 6	Navy Commendation Medal with Combat V and award star	Joint Service Achievement Medal
Navy Achievement Medal	Joint Meritorious Unit Award with oak leaf cluster	Navy Unit Commendation with one bronze service star	Navy Meritorious Unit Commendation with three service stars
National Defense Service Medal with service star	Armed Forces Expeditionary Medal	Southwest Asia Service Medal with two service stars	Afghanistan Campaign Medal with service star
Global War on Terrorism Expeditionary Medal	Global War on Terrorism Service Medal	Armed Forces Service Medal	Sea Service Deployment Ribbon with four service stars
Navy Arctic Service Ribbon	NATO Medal for service with ISAF	Kuwait Liberation Medal (Saudi Arabia)	Kuwait Liberation Medal (Kuwait)
Rifle Expert Badge		Pistol Expert Badge	
Office of the Joint Chiefs of Staff Identification Badge

== Personal life ==
In January 2022, Thomas was appointed board chairman of the Marine Corps Heritage Foundation. He is the former CEO and current board member of Draken International, LLC. In April 2023, Thomas was appointed CEO of Paradigm MedSolutions LLC.

Military offices
Preceded by Paul J. Rock Jr. Acting	Commanding General of the 2nd Marine Aircraft Wing; 2015–2016	Succeeded by Matthew Glavy
Preceded by Glenn M. Walters	Deputy Commandant for Programs and Resources of the United States Marine Corps; 2016–2018	Succeeded by John M. Jansen
Preceded by Glenn M. Walters	Assistant Commandant of the Marine Corps; 2018–2021	Succeeded by Eric M. Smith
