= William Chase III =

U.S. Navy admiral

William E. Chase III
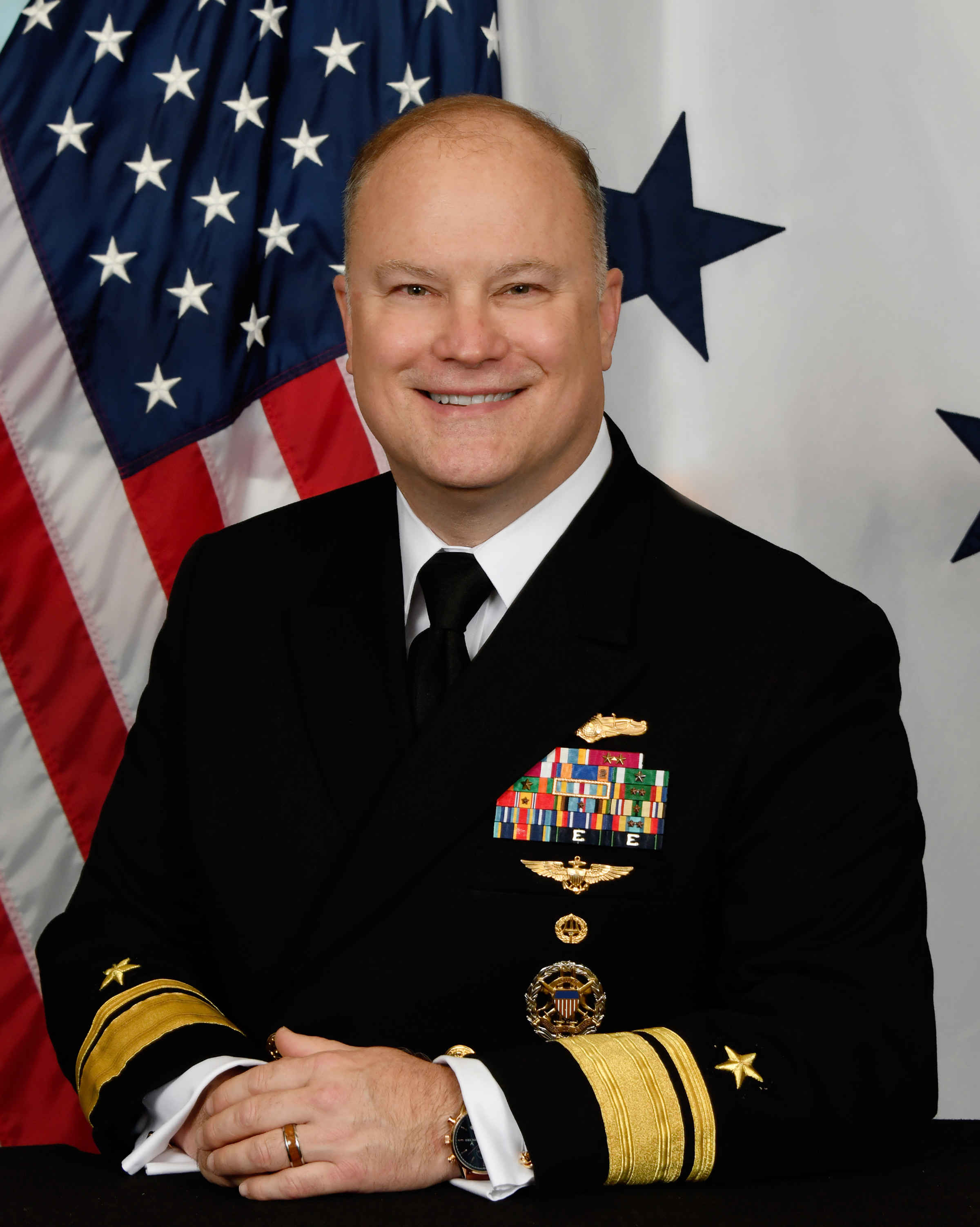
- Born: Washington, Missouri, U.S.
- Military career
- Allegiance: United States
- Branch: United States Navy
- Service years: 1990–2023
- Rank: Rear Admiral
- Commands: Naval Network Warfare Command; Task Force 1010; Naval Computer and Telecommunications Station Guam

William E. Chase III is a retired United States Navy rear admiral who last served as the deputy commander of the Joint Force Headquarters-Department of Defense Information Network from July 12, 2021 to August 2023. He most recently served as the Senior Military Advisor for Cyber Policy to the Under Secretary of Defense for Policy and the Deputy Principal Cyber Advisor to the United States Secretary of Defense from October 12, 2020 to July 2021. Previously, he was the Deputy Director of Command, Control, Communications, and Computers/Cyber of the Joint Staff from July 2018 to October 2020.

Military offices
Preceded by Thomas E. Murphy	Deputy Director of Command, Control, Communications, and Computers/Cyber of the Joint Staff; 2018–2020	Succeeded by Charles R. Parker
Preceded by Dennis Crall	Senior Military Advisor for Cyber Policy to the Under Secretary of Defense for Policy and the Deputy Principal Cyber Advisor to the United States Secretary of Defense; 2020–2021	Succeeded by Jeffrey S. Scheidt
Preceded by Paul H. Fredenburgh III	Deputy Commander of the Joint Force Headquarters-Department of Defense Information Network; 2021–2023	Succeeded by Heather W. Blackwell
