= Thomas E. Murphy (general) =

U.S. Air Force general

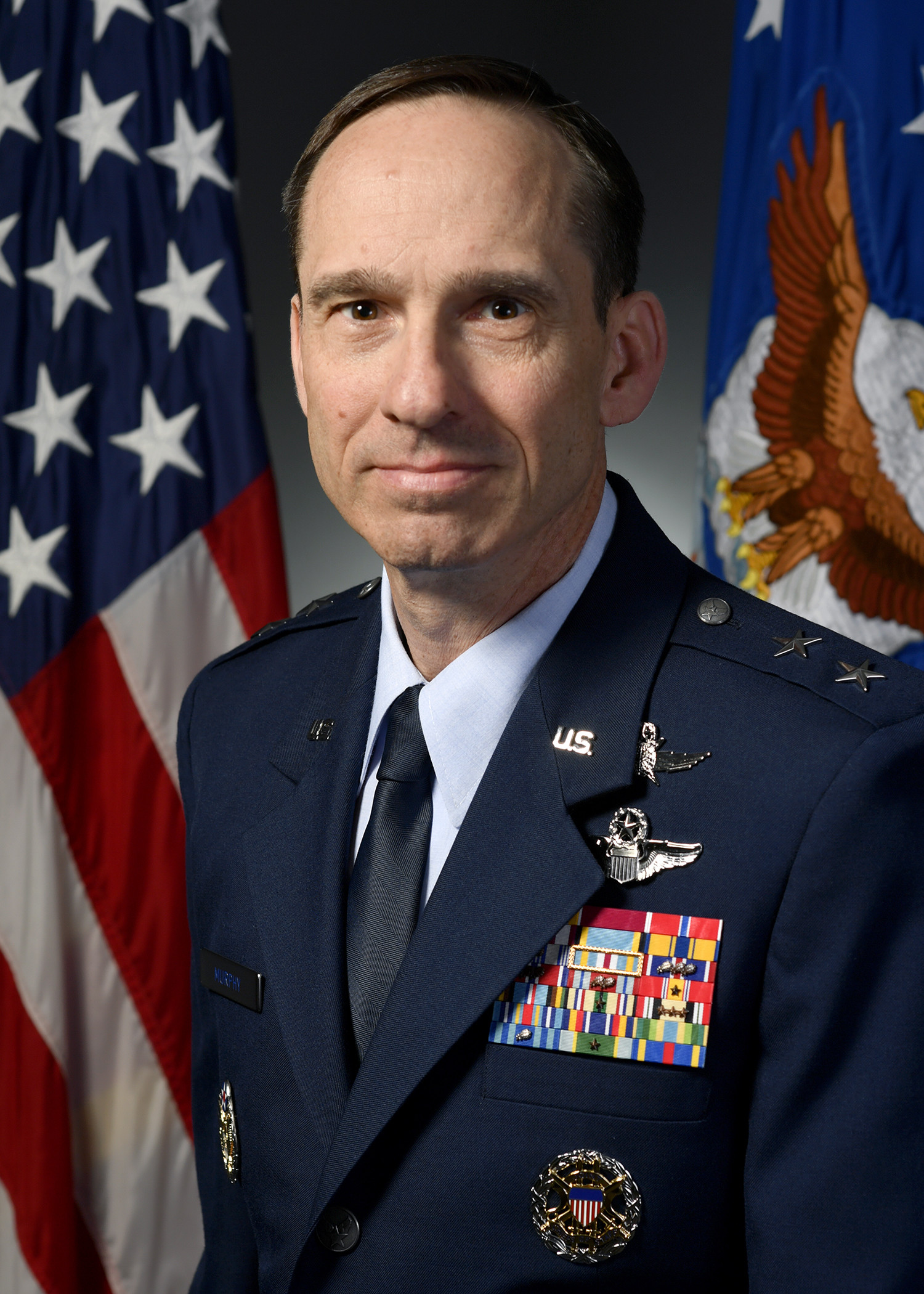
- Military career
- Allegiance: United States
- Branch: United States Air Force
- Service years: 1988-2021
- Rank: Major General
- Commands: 47th Flying Training Wing; 376th Expeditionary Operations Group; 9th Airlift Squadron
- Awards: Air Force Distinguished Service Medal (3); Legion of Merit

Thomas E. Murphy is a retired United States Air Force major general who last served as the director of the Protecting Critical Technology Task Force of the Office of the Secretary of Defense. Previously, he was the deputy director for resource integration of the U.S. Air Force.

Military offices
| Preceded by ??? | Commander of the 47th Flying Training Wing; 2011–2013 | Succeeded by Brian E. Hastings |
| Preceded by Robert J. Skinner | Vice Commander of the Twenty-Fourth Air Force and Air Forces Cyber; 2014–2016 | Succeeded by Mitchel Butikofer |
| Preceded by Mark E. Weatherington | Deputy Director of Command, Control, Communications, and Computers/Cyber of the Joint Staff; 2016–2018 | Succeeded by William Chase III |
| Preceded by Cedric D. George | Deputy Director of Resource Integration of the United States Air Force; 2018 | Succeeded by David J. Sanford |
| New office | Director of the Protecting Critical Technology Task Force of the Office of the Secretary of Defense; 2018–present | Incumbent |
