= Automatic Secure Voice Communications Network =

Former secure voice network for the United States Armed Forces

The Automatic Secure Voice Communications Network (AUTOSEVOCOM) was a worldwide, switched, secure voice network for the United States Armed Forces, which was operational from the late 1960s to the end of the 1980s. It was closely related to the Automatic Voice Network or AUTOVON, which was the main non-secure switched telephone network for the military.

== Phase I ==
During the mid-1960s, the United States Government decided to implement a worldwide secure voice network. This was named Automatic Secure Voice Communications Network, or by its acronym AUTOSEVOCOM, and was the National Security Agency's first program for the United States Department of Defense's telephone protection. It was a cumbersome and expensive system that was available only for high-level users. Because of its inadequacies, the Defense Department capped it at 1850 terminals, and in the late 1960s, hoping for something better, decided not to continue with the expansion of AUTOSEVOCOM.

Phase I of the network was approved by the Deputy Secretary of Defense in July 1967 and after that it took several years to implement AUTOSEVOCOM within the continental United States. AUTOSEVOCOM-I was a non-tactical network that enabled users to discuss classified or sensitive information over the telephone. The network consisted of switching centres, transmission facilities and subscriber terminals. Subscribers were homed either on an AUTOSEVOCOM switch, on an Automatic Voice Network (AUTOVON) switch, or a Joint Overseas Switchboard (JOSS), which were for example operated and maintained by numerous Signal Battalions in Vietnam.

The AUTOSEVOCOM switches provided for wideband secure voice communications between local subscribers and enabled them to establish long-distance secure voice calls. The majority of the long-distance calls were routed by the AUTOVON.

== Phase II ==
Difficulties with speech intelligibility, requirements for voice recognition, the holding of telephone conferences, speedier service, and simpler calling procedures led Defense officials to approve the development of an improved system, called AUTOSEVOCOM II. The Army was designated as the agency with the primary responsibility of developing the system. In May 1976, the Deputy Secretary of Defense approved the full-scale development of the AUTOSEVOCOM II programme.

AUTOSEVOCOM II incorporated technological advances and furnished higher quality communications for the several thousand subscribers who were expected to use it when put into operation during the years 1980 to 1985. The U.S. Army Communications Command acted as program manager for AUTOSEVOCOM II.

The Automatic Secure Voice Communications Network was succeeded by the Defense Red Switch Network (DRSN) and the STU-III secure phones. The last AUTOSEVOCOM secure voice switch in the world was deactivated at the Pentagon in 1994.
