= William J. Hilsman =

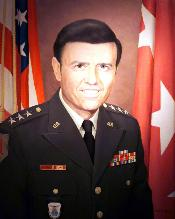
- Born: March 13, 1932 (age 94); St. Louis, Missouri, US
- Military career
- Allegiance: United States of America
- Branch: United States Army
- Service years: 1954–1983
- Rank: Lieutenant General
- Commands: Defense Information Systems Agency

William Joseph Hilsman (born March 13, 1932) is a retired United States Army lieutenant general who served as Director of the Defense Information Systems Agency from 1980 to 1983. Born in St. Louis, Missouri, the son of William Hilsman, he graduated from the United States Military Academy in 1954. Hilsman later earned an M.S. degree in electrical engineering from Northeastern University in 1962. He is the father of Air Force Brigadier General Allison A. Hickey.

In 1989, President George H. W. Bush appointed Hilsman as a member of the President's National Security Telecommunications Advisory Committee.
