= Combined Federated Battle Laboratories Network =

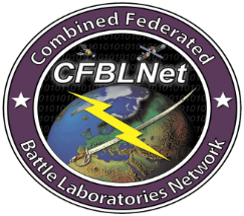
CFBLNet logo 2026

The Combined Federated Battle Laboratories Network (CFBLNet) is a laboratory environment which utilizes a distributed Wide Area Network (WAN) as the vehicle to simulate training environments and to de-risk command and control (C2) and intelligence capabilities by conducting Research and Development, Training, Trials and Assessment (RDTT&A) on command, control, communication, computer, cyber, intelligence, surveillance and reconnaissance (C5ISR) initiatives and training events. Since 2001, membership has been established and represented by three core parties: the U.S. Joint Staff, the Combined Communications-Electronics Board (Australia, Canada, New Zealand, United Kingdom and United States), and the North Atlantic Treaty Organization (including NATO agencies and 32 member nations, not all of which actively participate). Besides the core parties to the CFBLNet Technical Arrangement, CFBLNet recognizes Guest Mission Partner nations/organizations (Austria, Switzerland, Ukraine and EU-EEAS). CFBLNet governance documentation is referred to as CFBLNet Manual.

CFBLNet provides the main platform for conducting Coalition Interoperability Assurance and Validation (CIAV) events in the context of Federated Mission Networking.

== Network structure ==
The CFBLNet consists of a distributed and integrated network architecture of combined, joint, and military service infrastructure components (networks, database servers, application servers, client workstations, etc.). These strings of network equipment and services are located within the confines of the various national and international battle laboratories and experimentation sites of the participants, which provide the applications, analytic tools, and communications necessary to conduct initiatives or experiments.

No single nation owns the CFBLNet infrastructure; each member nation is responsible for the funding and maintenance of its own systems and CFBL network segments, which hook into the backbone at a defined national / organizational Point-of-Presence (POP). All CFBLNet members must respect the sovereignty and intellectual property of the other nations. Also, each country is responsible for funding its own experiments.

The CFBLNet infrastructure is extensive and reaches to international demarcation points for the Southern Hemisphere and Europe. Nations and organizations within nations which are not a part of the Technical Agreement must be sponsored to become a Guest CFBLNet Mission Partner (GMP) by a charter member, Core CFBLNet Mission Partner (CMP), to sponsor initiatives and to connect to the CFBLNet.

== History ==
The CFBLNet grew out the network designed to support the U.S. Joint Warfighter Interoperability Demonstrations (JWID), which used to build a support network for the period of the demonstrations and tear it down each year after the demonstrations. In 1999, the Coalition Warrior Interoperability Demonstration/Joint Warrior Interoperability Demonstration (CWID/JWID) exercise used, for the first time, a permanent infrastructure that became what is now called the Combined Federated Battle Laboratories Network (CFBLNet), as established by the NATO Consultation, Command and Control Board (NC3B) in 2001. The formal Technical Agreement (or charter) was first signed in August 2002.
