= Nancy A. Norton =

Joint Staff Director for Intelligence

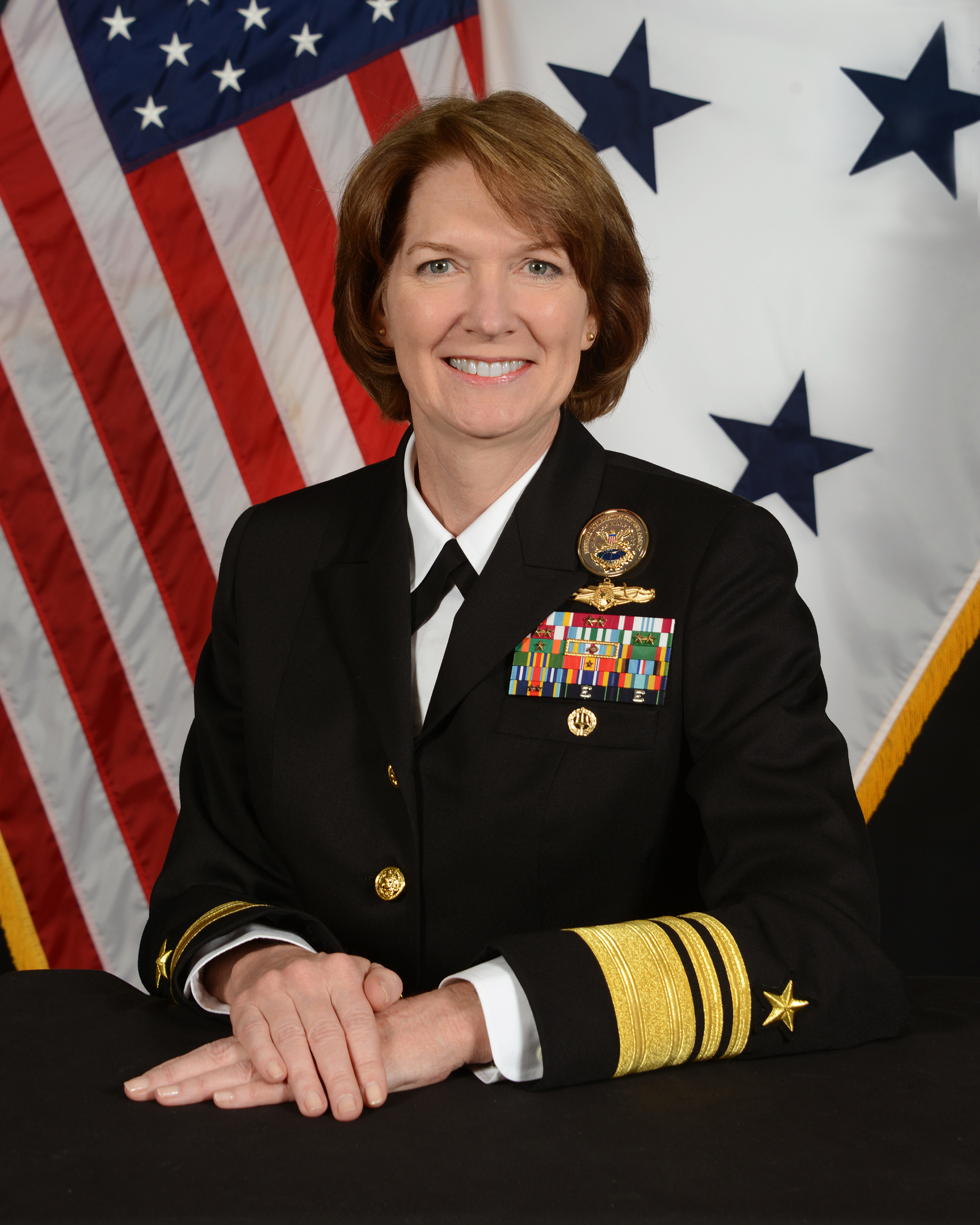
- Born: 1964 (age 61–62)
- Military career
- Allegiance: United States
- Branch: United States Navy
- Service years: 1986–2021
- Rank: Vice Admiral
- Commands: Defense Information Systems Agency; NCTS Bahrain
- Awards: Defense Distinguished Service Medal; Defense Superior Service Medal; Legion of Merit; Navy League Award

Nancy Ann Norton (born 1964) is a retired United States Navy vice admiral who previously served as the director of the Defense Information Systems Agency. Prior to that, as a flag officer she served as vice director of the same agency.

Norton is the daughter of William Norton and Judith Norton. Her step-father, Edward Becerra, whom her mother married when she was a teen, was a U.S. Marine Corps Master gunnery sergeant who served for over 24 years including two tours in Vietnam. She was raised in Coquille and Roseburg, Oregon and graduated from Roseburg High School in 1982. She earned a B.S. degree in general science from Portland State University in 1986. Norton was commissioned in the Navy through Officer Candidate School in 1987. She later received an M.S. degree in computer science from the Naval Postgraduate School in 1994 and an M.A. degree in national security and strategic studies from the Naval War College in 2008.

Her operational tours at sea include serving as communications officer for Commander, Cruiser Destroyer Group 12 aboard USS Enterprise (CVN-65) and for Commander, Naval Forces Europe and Commander, U.S. Sixth Fleet.

Ashore, Norton commanded Naval Computer and Telecommunications Station Bahrain; served three tours on the Office of the Chief of Naval Operations staff; the U.S. Pacific Fleet staff; U.S. Pacific Command staff; as officer-in-charge of Naval Telecommunications Center, Fallon, Nevada; and Naval Communications Area Master Station Eastern Pacific.

== Personal life ==
Norton is married to retired U.S. Navy officer Bruce Hamilton.

Military offices
Preceded by Alan R. Lynn	Director of the Defense Information Systems Agency; 2018–2021	Succeeded by Robert J. Skinner
