= AFCEA =

Military professional association

AFCEA International
- Formation: 1946; 80 years ago
- Type: 501(c)(6)
- Tax ID no.: 53-0180161
- Legal status: nonprofit membership association
- Purpose: To provide a forum for the ethical exchange of information and increase of knowledge through the exploration of issues relevant to its members in information technology, communications, and electronics for the defense, homeland security, and intelligence communities.
- Headquarters: Fairfax, Virginia, U.S.
- Chairman, Board of Directors: Tamara Greenspan
- President, Chief Executive Officer: Lt. Gen. Susan Lawrence, USA (Ret.)
- Subsidiaries: AFCEA Educational Foundation _{(501(c)(3))},
- Revenue: $17,563,322 (2018)
- Expenses: $17,471,228 (2018)
- Employees: 60 (2017)
- Volunteers: 1,800 (2017)
- Website: www.afcea.org
- Formerly called: Army Signal Association, Armed Forces Communications Association, Armed Forces Communications and Electronics Association

AFCEA International (formerly called Armed Forces Communications & Electronics Association International), established in 1946, is a nonprofit membership association serving the military, government, industry and academia as a forum for advancing professional knowledge and relationships in the fields of communications, information technology, intelligence and global security. AFCEA provides a forum for military, government, academic and industry communities with altogether more than 30,000 members. AFCEA supports local chapters, sponsors events, publishes a magazine, promotes STEM education and provides member benefits.

== History ==
Following the American Civil War, the United States Veterans Signal Association was formed from the original Signal Corps established under Maj. Albert J. Myer of the U.S. Army.

This organization was active for many years, ultimately being augmented by veterans from the Spanish–American War and World War I. The American Signal Corps Association, another World War I group, merged with the U.S. Veterans Signal Association in 1918 and was active until 1944 (World War II).

In May 1946, Maj. Gen. Harry C. Ingles, Brig. Gen. David Sarnoff, and a number of industry leaders joined to found the Army Signal Association, absorbing the remaining chapters of its predecessors. In 1947, the name was changed to the Armed Forces Communications Association, and in 1954 the name evolved as the Armed Forces Communications and Electronics Association.

In the 1970s, Gordon T. Gould served as the organization's national vice president; after his 1979 death, AFCEA created an award in his honor which is presented annually for the best classified paper on a communications or electronics topic. In 1979, the Armed Forces Communications and Electronics Association became international with the establishment of chapters in Europe, Asia and Canada. On October 1, 2018, the organization's name was shortened to AFCEA International.

== SIGNAL Magazine ==
SIGNAL, not to be confused with the German Signal magazine, is a monthly international news magazine targeting government, military and industry professionals active in the information technology and intelligence fields. The magazine was started in 1946. Among the topics covered in the magazine are command, control, communications, computers, intelligence, surveillance and reconnaissance (C4ISR); information security; cybersecurity; research and development; artificial intelligence, machine learning, big data, cloud technologies, electronics; and homeland security.

== Online publications ==
A monthly online newsletter, SIGNAL Connections, is emailed mid-month to members. AFCEA's online directories include the corporate member directory, which provides access to detailed information about the companies that support AFCEA. In addition, information in this directory also is available according to corporate focus categories in the Cybersecurity, Intelligence, Health IT, Education and Homeland Security directories. Organizations provide the information in these online publications, including contacts, business focus, products/services, and/or clients.

AFCEA is involved in additional communications technologies, including webinars, podcasts, blogs, and RSS Feeds. AFCEA has a presence in social media platforms.

== Foundation ==
The association, in partnership with the AFCEA Educational Foundation, chapters and members, presents $2 million annually in scholarships, grants and awards in six categories: college students with science, technology, engineering and mathematics (STEM) majors; current and future teachers of STEM subjects in U.S. middle and high schools; underserved/minority college students studying STEM fields; students in fields related to security such as intelligence, cyber and homeland security; ROTC cadets/midshipmen and military personnel; and students attending the five service academies and other military educational institutions.

== Professional Development Center ==
AFCEA's Professional Development provides a wide range of programs of continuing education, leadership development and technical training courses. Courses are available for presentation on-site at organizations' facilities. In addition, some sessions at AFCEA conferences and chapter events qualify as continuing education to maintain cybersecurity certifications.

The association also has partnerships with several higher education institutions that offer members discounts on tuition both in the classroom and online.

== Women in STEM ==
Through leadership development, education, events, and networking, the association helps women advance in their careers.

== Early Career Professionals and Students ==
The Emerging Professionals in Intelligence Community (EPIC) Committee enables young professionals to learn about the various aspects in this specialty field.

== Small Businesses and Entrepreneurs ==
Through the Small Business Committee and several focused events, the association provides strategies and programs about business processes, upcoming contracts and marketing.

== Chapters ==
AFCEA has more than 130 chapters and sub-chapters around the world to provide professional education and networking opportunities. Most hold monthly meetings to exchange ideas about communications, intelligence, cybersecurity and information systems technologies. Nearly one-half of AFCEA's chapters conduct symposia and seminars in addition to other chapter activities. Individual chapters provide college scholarships, fund classroom equipment and mentor students in science fairs and technology clubs.

== Conferences ==
AFCEA conferences offer problem-solving opportunities to C4ISR, intelligence, cybersecurity, homeland security and information technology professionals through exhibits, technical panels and speakers. Events include:

- West Conference and Exposition, San Diego, California
- TechNet Indo-Pacific Conference and Exposition, Honolulu, Hawaii
- AFCEA/George Mason University Symposium, Fairfax, Virginia
- Homeland Security Conference, Washington, D.C.
- Intelligence and National Security Summit, September, Washington, D.C.
- TechNet Augusta, August Augusta, Georgia
- TechNet Cyber, Baltimore, Maryland
- Classified intelligence events and industry days, various locations
- TechNet conferences and expositions in various European locations
- Rocky Mountain Cyber Symposium, Colorado Springs, Colorado
- Space Industry Days, Los Angeles, California
- Chapter meetings, technical panels and symposia, various locations.
