= Bill Hillsman =

American political consultant and advertising executive

- Born: William Gerard Hillsman, Jr. August 14, 1953 (age 71); Chicago, Illinois, U.S.
- Occupation(s): Political Consultant and Advertising Executive
- Website: Bill Hillsman; North Woods Advertising

William Gerard Hillsman, Jr. (born August 14, 1953 in Chicago, Illinois) is an American political consultant and advertising executive. He works and lives in Minneapolis, Minnesota. A graduate of Carleton College, Hillsman worked for various ad agencies until founding his own, North Woods Advertising, in 1985.

In 1993, Hillsman handled Sharon Sayles Belton's successful campaign to become mayor of Minneapolis, Minnesota.

In the Spring 2002 semester, Hillsman was Resident Fellow at Harvard Kennedy School at Harvard University.

In 2004, Hillsman authored Run The Other Way: Fixing the Two-Party System, One Campaign at a Time, which was published by Simon & Schuster.

He has been profiled on Adweek, The Christian Science Monitor and Slate.
