= William Hilsman (politician) =

American politician

William Edward Hilsman (May 22, 1900 – 1964) was an American Democratic politician who held office in the Missouri General Assembly. He served as a member of the Missouri Senate from 1949 to 1961.

Hilsman was born in St. Louis, Missouri, and received his education in both public and parochial schools. On September 8, 1928, he married Mary Loretto Hayes. In addition to his political career, Hilsman worked in the insurance business and served in the 138th Infantry during World War IThe regiment fought alongside Colonel George S. Patton's tank brigade to capture the villages of Cheppy and Exermont. After the Meuse-Argonne, the 138th assumed occupation duty south of Verdun.
