= General Warner =

General Warner may refer to:

- James M. Warner (1836–1897), Union Army brevet brigadier general
- Volney F. Warner (1926–2019), U.S. Army four-star general
- Willard Warner (1826–1906), Union Army brevet brigadier general
- William Warner (Conservative politician) (1867–1950) was a British Indian Army brigadier general

== See also ==
- Attorney General Warner (disambiguation)
