= List of former unified combatant commands =

Since the first Unified Command Plan was approved on 14 December 1946, several unified and specified (see JP 1-02, p. 222) combatant commands have been established and disestablished. Some of the commands existed before they were officially established as unified or specified commands, or continued to exist after they were disestablished as such.

Emblem	Command	Acronym	Type	Established	Disestablished	Comments
	Strategic Air Command	SAC	Specified	1946-12-14	1992-05-31	Replaced by United States Strategic Command, which also took over its command facilities at Offutt AFB, NB.
	Alaskan Command	ALCOM	Unified	1947-01-01	1975-06-30	Became a subunified command under U.S. Pacific Command; subsequently a subunified command under U.S. Northern Command
	Far East Command	FECOM	Unified	1947-01-01	1957-07-01	Duties assumed by United States Pacific Command
	Caribbean Command	CARIBCOM	Unified	1947-11-01	1963-06-06	Replaced by USSOUTHCOM
	U.S. Naval Forces, Eastern Atlantic and Mediterranean	NELM	Specified	1947-11-01	1963-12-01	Became part of USEUCOM as its USN component and renamed United States Naval Forces Europe.
	Atlantic Command	LANTCOM	Unified	1947-12-01	1999-09-31	Replaced by United States Joint Forces Command
	Northeastern Command	USNEC	Unified	1950-10-01	1956-09-01	Most functions assumed by Northeast Air Command.
	United States Air Forces in Europe	USAFE	Specified	1951-01-22	1956-07-01	Became part of USEUCOM as its USAF component command; still remains a USAF major command (MAJCOM)
	Continental Air Defense Command	CONAD	Unified	1954-09-01	1975-06-30	Replaced by ADCOM
	Strike Command	USSTRICCOM	Unified	1962-01-01	1971-12-31	Reorganized as United States Readiness Command
	Aerospace Defense Command	ADCOM	Specified	1975-07-01	1979-10-01	Duties assumed by Air Defense, Tactical Air Command (ADTAC); responsibilities now rest with First Air Force.
	Readiness Command	USREDCOM	Unified	1972-01-01	1987-04-15	
	Military Airlift Command	MAC	Specified	1977-02-01	1987-07-01	Duties as a specified command assumed by USTRANSCOM; later replaced as a USAF major command (MAJCOM) by Air Mobility Command in 1992
	U.S. Space Command	USSPACECOM	Unified	1985-09-23	2002-10-01	Merged with US Strategic Command to form a new US Strategic Command. A second Space Command, separate from the first incarnation, was established 29 August 2019.
	U.S. Strategic Command	USSTRATCOM	Unified	1992-06-01	2002-10-01	Merged with US Space Command to form a new US Strategic Command.
	Joint Forces Command	USJFCOM	Unified	1999-10-01	2011-09-03	Duties assumed by the Joint Staff and various other combatant commands
