= Volney F. Warner =

United States general (1926–2019)

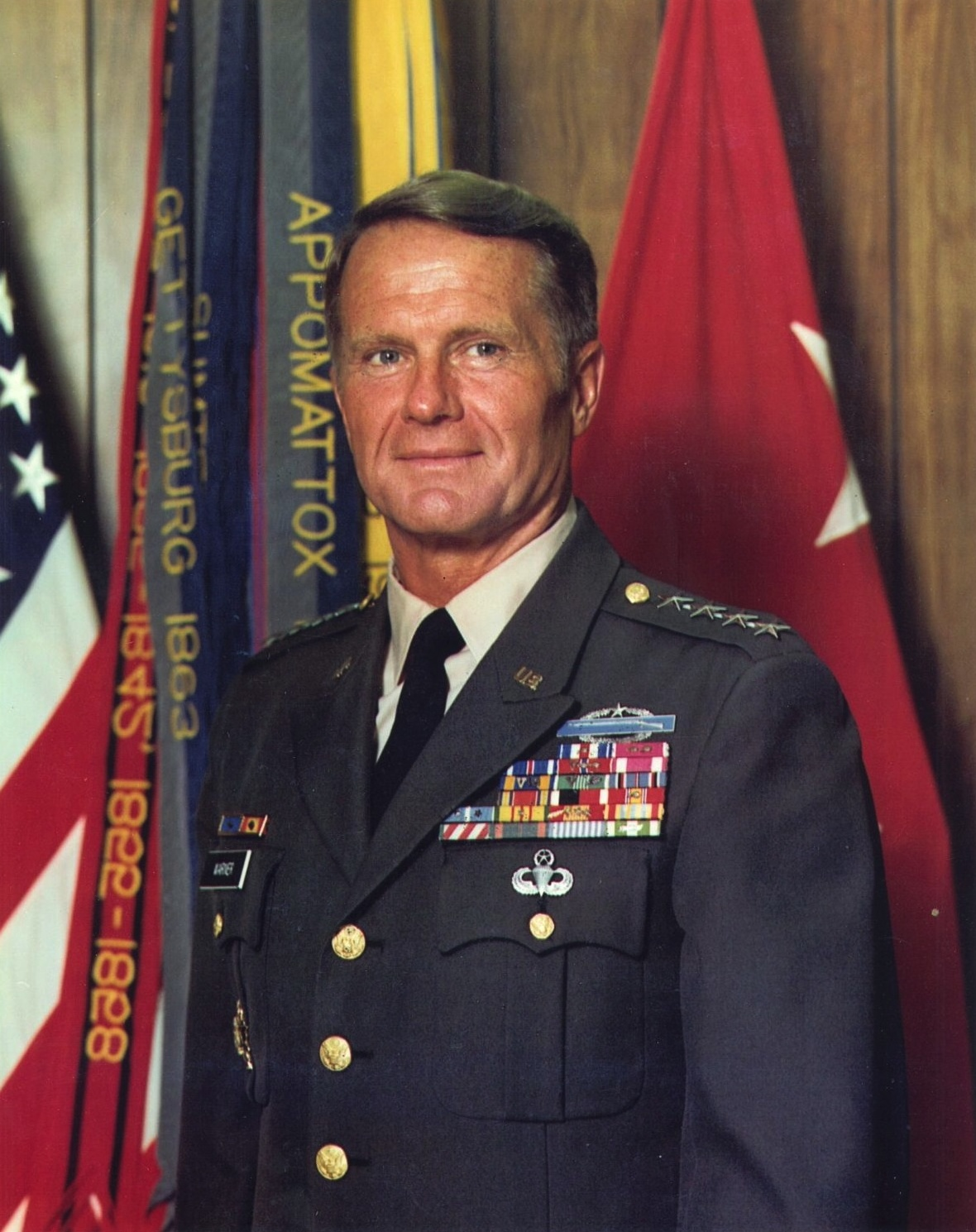
- Official portrait of Warner in 1981
- Born: Volney Frank Warner; 7 June 1926; Woonsocket, South Dakota, U.S.
- Died: 13 November 2019 (aged 93); McLean, Virginia, U.S.
- Military career
- Allegiance: United States of America
- Branch: United States Army
- Service years: 1944–1945; 1950–1981
- Rank: General
- Commands: U.S. Readiness Command; XVIII Airborne Corps; 9th Infantry Division
- Conflicts: Korean War; Vietnam War
- Awards: Defense Distinguished Service Medal; Silver Star (2); Legion of Merit (3); Distinguished Flying Cross; Bronze Star with V Device (3); Air Medal; Combat Infantryman Badge with star Master Parachutist
- Other work: Owns/operates consulting firm

Volney Frank Warner (7 June 1926 – 13 November 2019) was a United States Army four-star general who served as Commander-in-Chief, United States Readiness Command (USCINCRED) from 1979 to 1981.

== Early career ==
Warner was born in Woonsocket, South Dakota. He enlisted in the Navy in 1944, then was transferred to the Army the following year upon receiving an alternate appointment from South Dakota to the United States Military Academy at West Point. Graduating in 1950, he was commissioned a second lieutenant in the Infantry. Almost immediately after graduation, he was ordered to Korea, where he served in combat as an Infantry platoon leader in L-Company of the 21st Infantry Regiment, 24th Infantry Division.

In 1953, Warner was reassigned to Europe where he served as a company commander and battalion staff officer in Trieste, Italy, Austria, and West Germany. Following attendance at the U.S. Marine Corps Advanced Course in Quantico, Virginia, Warner served a tour of duty at West Point as an instructor in the Department of Psychology and Leadership, after earning a Master of Arts Degree in Psychology from Vanderbilt University.

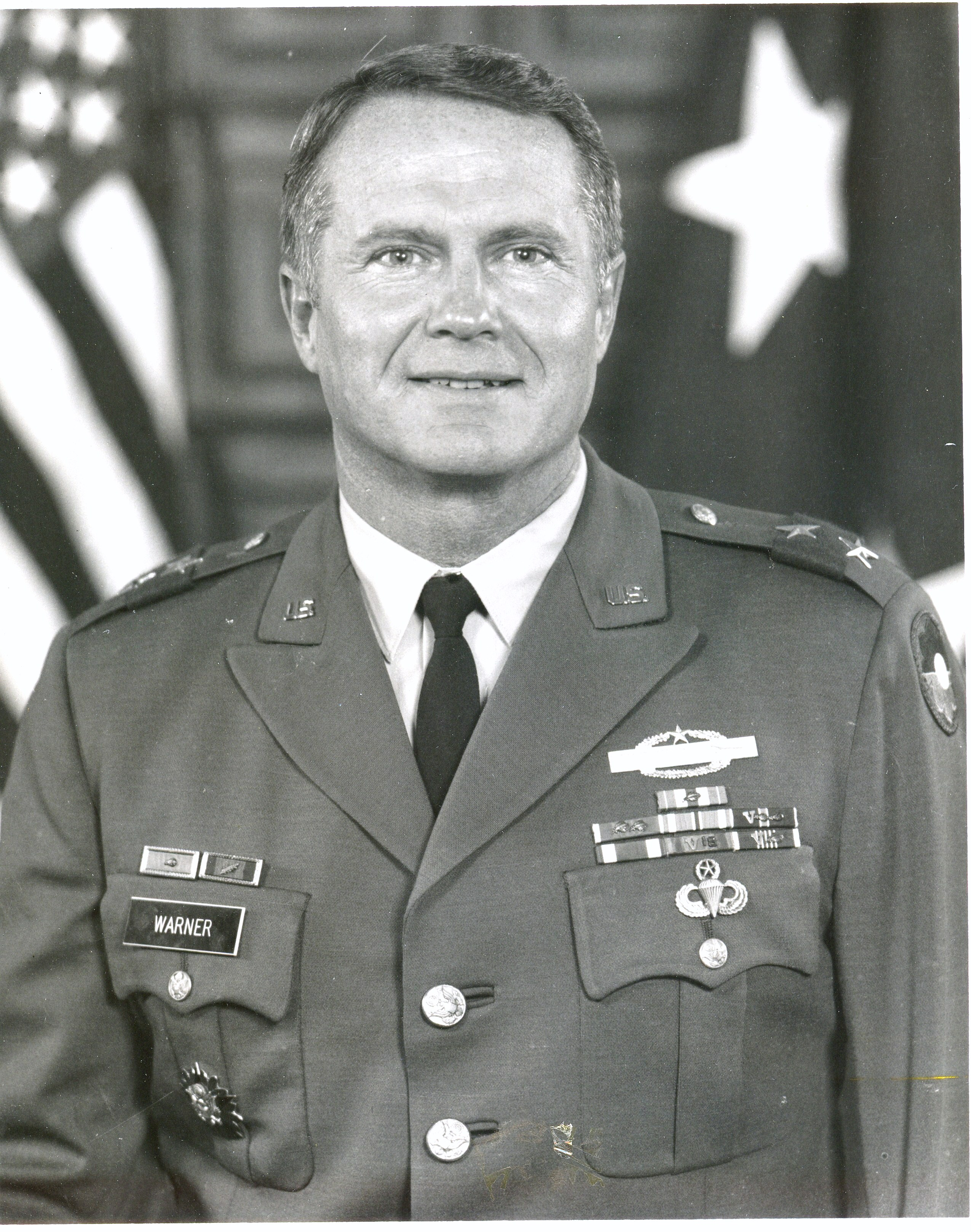
Warner as a major general (two star)

In 1963, Warner was reassigned as a Province Senior Advisor in Kiên Giang province, South Vietnam. After returning from Vietnam in 1965, he served in a variety of positions in Washington, D.C., to include duty as the Military Assistant to the Special Assistant to the President for Vietnam Affairs. After earning a Masters of Science in International Relations from George Washington University, in 1969 Warner assumed command of the 3rd Brigade, 4th Infantry Division in the Central Highlands of Vietnam. Returning to the Pentagon in 1970, Warner served as the Executive Officer and Senior Aide to the Army Chief of Staff. In 1972 Warner was reassigned to the 82nd Airborne Division, first as the Chief of Staff and then as the Assistant Division Commander for Operations.

After a tour of duty as the United States Army Forces Command (FORSCOM) Assistant Deputy Chief of Staff for Operations, General Warner assumed command of the 9th Infantry Division in 1975. Later in 1977, Warner assumed command of the XVIII Airborne Corps.

== Commander in Chief, U.S. Readiness Command ==
In 1979 Warner assumed his duties as the Commander in Chief, Readiness Command (REDCOM), headquartered at MacDill Air Force Base in Tampa, Florida. His tenure as REDCOM commander coincided with the interservice debate over which unified command should have jurisdiction over the Middle East and the associated Rapid Deployment Force.

In 1980, the Rapid Deployment Joint Task Force (RDJTF) was created under the command of Marine Lieutenant General Paul X. Kelley and based at MacDill Air Force Base. During planning and training exercises in the United States, the RDJTF reported to REDCOM, which was responsible for preparing United States-based Army and Air Force units for overseas deployment, but during operations the force was controlled by whichever headquarters had oversight over the territory in which it was deployed. Since the RDJTF was expected to operate mainly in the Middle East, permanent operational control over the force implied geographical responsibility for Southwest Asia. At the time, no unified command was specifically responsible for that increasingly critical region, which was divided between United States European Command and United States Pacific Command.

Warner opposed proposals to assign the RDJTF to either European or Pacific Command, or to allow the RDJTF to oversee the Middle East as an autonomous command. Instead he asked that the land responsibility for Southwest Asia be returned to Readiness Command, which had overseen the Middle East and sub-Saharan Africa in its previous incarnation as United States Strike Command. Meanwhile, he insisted that as long as the RDJTF was headquartered in the United States, REDCOM was its governing unified command and the RDJTF should not continue to bypass the REDCOM commander by maintaining an independent office in Washington, D.C.

The interservice controversy over which unified command should control the RDJTF created friction between the REDCOM and RDJTF headquarters staffs and eventually spilled into the press, which cast the debate as a personal feud between Warner and Kelley. "Unfortunately, we were both caught up in the service argument as to whether it should be a premier Army or Marine force," Warner said.

On 25 April 1981, Secretary of Defense Caspar Weinberger announced that the RDJTF would become a separate command with responsibility for Southwest Asia. Rebuffed in his attempt to renew the mandate of his command, Warner requested retirement, citing a lack of support from the Joint Chiefs of Staff during the debate. In parting, he observed that if the RDJTF were to be made an independent unified command, then REDCOM would be redundant and should be disestablished. The RDJTF became United States Central Command in 1983 and REDCOM was replaced by United States Special Operations Command in 1987.

== Post-military ==
Warner retired from the Army on 31 July 1981. Subsequently, Warner was Vice President of Applied Technology, Vertex Systems, Incorporated, and later established V.F. Warner and Associates, a Washington-based consulting firm. He resided in McLean, Virginia.

== Personal life ==
Warner's awards and decorations include the Defense Distinguished Service Medal, Silver Star (with Oak Leaf Cluster), Legion of Merit (with 2 Oak Leaf Clusters), Distinguished Flying Cross, Bronze Star with V Device (with 2 Oak Leaf Clusters), Meritorious Service Medal, Air Medals with V Device, Army Commendation Medal with V Device (with Oak Leaf Cluster), Combat Infantryman Badge (2nd Award), and Master Parachutist Badge. His military education includes the Command and General Staff College in 1963; Armed Forces Staff College in 1965; and the National War College in 1969, at which time he also received a Master of Science degree in International Relations from George Washington University.

Warner married Belva Janice Forbes in 1950, and had two daughters and two sons, one a retired brigadier general and the other a retired colonel. On 18 August 2005, Warner's granddaughter, First Lieutenant Laura Margaret Walker, was killed in action in Delak, Afghanistan, making her the first female West Point graduate to die in combat. Warner later come out to publicly criticize the Iraq War, and proposed pre-emptive peace as an alternative to pre-emptive war for the future. Volney Warner died on 13 November 2019, at the age of 93.

== The Wounded Knee Siege of 1973 ==
While serving as Chief of Staff to the 82nd Airborne Division, Warner was seconded to the White House by General Alexander Haig, then Chief of Staff to President Nixon. Warner was to serve as the senior federal representative to address the standoff at the Pine Ridge Indian Reservation. Warner successfully resolved the issue without bloodshed. Attorney Kenneth Tilsen, representing the American Indian Movement, commented that "Warner was the only one who really knew what he was doing...".

Colonel Warner, in civilian clothes, arrived in the area on March 3 with orders to determine whether U.S. troops should be committed — a serious decision, since an executive order from the President would be required. Joseph Trimbach, Special Agent in Charge (SAC) of the regional FBI office in Minneapolis, who met him at Ellsworth Air Force Base, near Rapid City, assured him that this was a case for the U.S. Army: The FBI requested that two thousand soldiers seize the reservation and restore order, after which the FBI would move in and make arrests. Colonel Warner recommended that SAC Trimbach's request be refused, and also that the FBI change its standing orders from shoot–to–kill to shoot–to–wound, in light of the fact that the Indians were not trying to harm anyone. The symbolic presence of the U.S. Army, in the person of Colonel Warner, is credited with blocking the all–out attack that the FBI and its allies had in mind.

== Boots on the ground ==
Warner is credited with coining the phrase "boots on the ground", to mean the actual forces engaged in a conflict. The first use of the phrase is identified as a quote in the Christian Science Monitor (11 April 1980) in reference to the Iran hostage crisis: "US options grow more difficults [sic] as the chance of a Soviet response increases. However, many American strategists now argue that even light, token US land forces – 'getting US combat boots on the ground' as General Warner puts it – would signal to an enemy that the US is physically guarding the area and can only be dislodged at the risk of war."
