= Strike Command =

Strike Command, a military formation, can mean either:

- Air Force Global Strike Command, a major command of the United States Air Force
- RAF Strike Command (1968-2007)
- United States Strike Command (1961-1972)
