= Robert H. Barrow =

United States Marine Corps general (1922–2008)

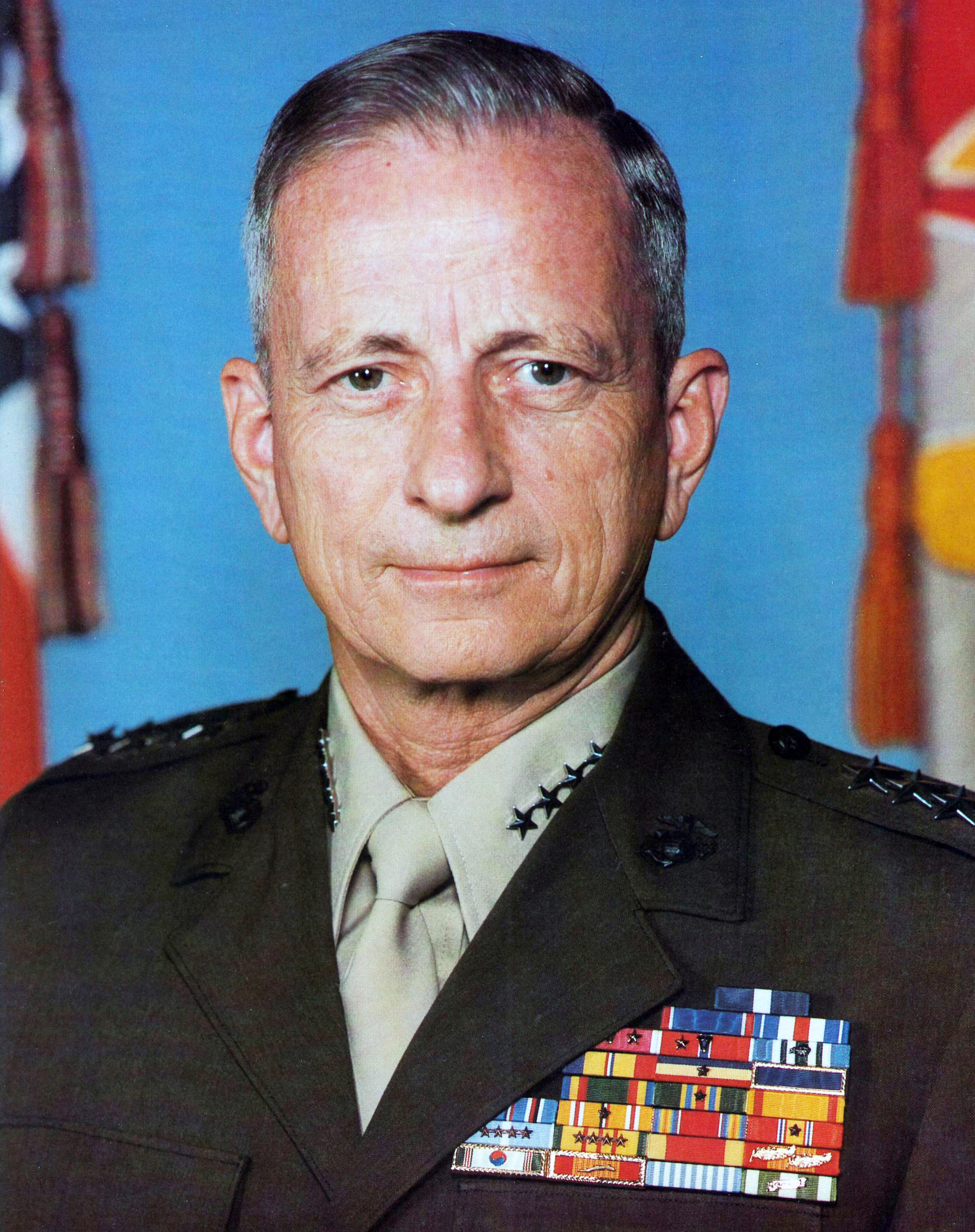
- General Robert H. Barrow c. 1978–79
- Born: February 5, 1922; Baton Rouge, Louisiana, U.S.
- Died: October 30, 2008 (aged 86); St. Francisville, Louisiana, U.S.
- Military career
- Allegiance: United States
- Branch: United States Marine Corps
- Service years: 1942–1983
- Rank: General
- Commands: Commandant of the Marine Corps; Fleet Marine Force, Atlantic; Marine Corps Recruit Depot Parris Island; Marine Corps Base Camp Smedley D. Butler; 9th Marine Regiment
- Conflicts: World War II; Defense of China; Korean War; Battle of Inchon; Second Battle of Seoul; Battle of Chosin Reservoir; Vietnam War; Operation Dewey Canyon
- Awards: Navy Cross; Distinguished Service Cross; Defense Distinguished Service Medal (2); Navy Distinguished Service Medal; Army Distinguished Service Medal; Silver Star; Legion of Merit (3); Bronze Star Medal (2)
- Other work: Foreign Intelligence Advisory Board

Robert Hilliard Barrow (February 5, 1922 – October 30, 2008) was a United States Marine Corps four-star general. Barrow was the 27th Commandant of the Marine Corps from 1979 to 1983. He served for 41 years, including overseas command duty in World War II, the Korean War and the Vietnam War. Barrow was awarded the Navy Cross and Distinguished Service Cross for extraordinary heroism in Korea and Vietnam, respectively.

== Early life ==
Barrow was born on February 5, 1922, in Baton Rouge, Louisiana, and grew up on his family's Rosale Plantation in West Feliciana Parish, Louisiana. The family's circumstances were difficult. They had no electricity, so Barrow satisfied an early passion for reading by using a kerosene lamp.

Because it offered free tuition and low boarding costs, Barrow attended Louisiana State University from 1939 to 1942, working as a waiter and a janitor and served in the university's Corps of Cadets.

== Marine Corps career ==
=== World War II ===
In 1942, Barrow left the university early to join the United States Marine Corps. He attended recruit training at Marine Corps Recruit Depot San Diego and was retained as a Drill Instructor after his graduation. While serving on the drill field, he was selected to attend Officer Candidate School in February 1943. He was commissioned a second lieutenant on May 19, 1943.

Barrow served in China during World War II. He was a first lieutenant in the United States Navy Group China, Sino-American Cooperative Organization (SACO) from August 1944 to November 1945. SACO was a United States trained and equipped Chinese guerilla team in Japanese-occupied Central China. Barrow is said by his son to have described his China service as one of his "most vivid experiences". For his service, he was awarded the Bronze Star Medal with Combat "V".

=== Korean War ===
Barrow commanded Company A, 1st Battalion, 1st Marines during the Korean War and participated in the Inchon-Seoul campaign and in the Chosin Reservoir campaign. He has been described as the "finest company commander" of the Korean War. For his heroism in holding a pass near Koto-ri on December 9–10, 1950, he was awarded the Navy Cross.

Barrow's Navy Cross citation reads:

The President of the United States takes pleasure in presenting the NAVY CROSS to ROBERT H. BARROW (0-23471), CAPTAIN, UNITED STATES MARINE CORPS, for extraordinary heroism in connection with military operations against an armed enemy of the United Nations while serving as Commanding Officer of Company A, First Battalion, First Marines, First Marine Division (Reinforced), in action against enemy aggressor forces in the vicinity of Koto-ri, Korea, on 9 and 10 December 1950. Ordered to seize and occupy the high ground on Hill 1081 dominating the pass below and held by a heavily-fortified, deeply-entrenched enemy of approximately battalion strength controlling all approaches to his company's objective, Captain BARROW boldly led his company up the ice covered, windswept, razor backed ridge in a blinding snowstorm and, employing artillery, mortars and close air support, launched a well-coordinated attack. With his forward assault platoon suddenly brought under withering automatic weapons, small-arms and mortar fire from commanding ground as they moved along the narrow snow-covered ridge toward a bare mountain top studded with hostile bunkers and foxholes, he fearlessly advanced to the front under blistering shellfire, directing and deploying his men and shouting words of encouragement as they followed him to close with the enemy in furious hand-to-hand combat. Reorganizing his depleted units following the bitter conflict, he spearheaded a daring and skillful enveloping maneuver, striking the enemy by surprise on the right flank and destroying many emplacements as he continued the final drive up the steep slope in the face of heavy automatic weapons and grenade fire to secure the objective with a total loss to the enemy of more than 300 dead and wounded. By his gallant and forceful leadership, great personal valor and fortitude maintained in the face of overwhelming odds, Captain BARROW aided immeasurably in insuring the safe passage of the First Marine Division through this hazardous pass, and his inspiring devotion to duty throughout reflects the highest credit upon himself and the United States Naval Service.

=== Interwar years ===
In February 1956, Barrow began an 18-month tour with the 2nd Battalion, 6th Marines at Camp Lejeune, North Carolina. From the summer of 1957 to the summer of 1960, he served as the Marine Officer Instructor, at the Tulane University Naval Reserve Officer Training Corps. In September 1959, he was promoted to lieutenant colonel. Barrow graduated from the National War College in June 1968.

=== Vietnam War ===
Barrow served in the Vietnam War as commanding officer of the 9th Marine Regiment, 3rd Marine Division (Rein) and was a Deputy G-3 in the III Marine Amphibious Force. While in command of the 9th Marines, he saw combat near the DMZ, Khe Sanh, Da Krong Valley, and A Shau Valley. He received the Distinguished Service Cross for his extraordinary heroism in Operation Dewey Canyon.

Barrow's Distinguished Service Cross citation reads:

The President of the United States takes pleasure in presenting the DISTINGUISHED SERVICE CROSS to ROBERT H. BARROW (0-23471), COLONEL, UNITED STATES MARINE CORPS, for extraordinary heroism in connection with military operations involving conflict with an armed hostile force in the Republic of Vietnam, while serving with Headquarters, Ninth Marine Regiment, Third Marine Division (Reinforced). Colonel BARROW distinguished himself by exceptionally valorous actions during the period from 22 January to 18 March 1969 while commanding a regiment in Operation DEWEY CANYON in Quang Tri Province. Throughout the eight-week campaign in the Da Krong and A Shau Valleys, Colonel BARROW remained with the forward elements of his command, directing their insertion into enemy-held territory. Despite adverse flying conditions, he made numerous low-level reconnaissance flights in his command helicopter. Under his supervision, his troops swept the determined North Vietnamese forces back to the Laotian border, decimating countless fortifications and base camps and confiscating prodigious quantities of communist weapons and munitions. Despite the continuous hostile artillery and rocket bombardment of his command post, he persisted in retaining his position in close proximity to the enemy activity. During one concentrated attack on his post, he repeatedly exposed himself to the withering hostile fusillade in order to direct the repulsion of the enemy. After the two-month operation, his regiment confirmed over one thousand three hundred dead and accounted for tremendous amounts of captured North Vietnamese equipment. Colonel BARROW'S extraordinary heroism and devotion to duty were in keeping with the highest traditions of the military service and reflect great credit upon himself, his unit, and the United States Marine Corps.

=== General officer ===
In August 1969, Barrow was promoted to brigadier general, then deployed to Japan to serve as commanding general at Camp Butler in Okinawa. He received a Legion of Merit for his three years of service and left Okinawa as a major general select. On promotion to major general, he became commanding general of Marine Corps Recruit Depot, Parris Island.

Barrow was promoted to lieutenant general in 1975 and assigned to Headquarters Marine Corps as deputy chief of staff for manpower. In 1976, he was named commanding general of Fleet Marine Force, Atlantic, at Norfolk, Virginia. In July 1978, Barrow became the Assistant Commandant of the Marine Corps, serving until July 1979 when he became the Commandant of the Marine Corps. From 1978 to 1979, Barrow also served as president of the Marine Corps Association.

Barrow was the first commandant to serve, by law, as a regular full member of the Joint Chiefs of Staff. As commandant, "he was instrumental in acquiring approval of production for the Marine Corps of the American-modified Harrier aircraft, in awakening interest in new and improved naval gunfire support, in getting amphibious ships included in the navy's new construction programs, and in returning hospital ships to the fleet, especially on station with Marine Corps amphibious task forces."

In 1981, Barrow received the Golden Plate Award of the American Academy of Achievement presented by Awards Council member General David C. Jones, USAF.

Barrow retired from the Marine Corps on 30 June 1983, and was presented with the Navy Distinguished Service Medal upon retirement.

=== Military awards ===
Barrow's decorations, awards, and badges include:

1st Row	Navy Cross	Distinguished Service Cross	Defense Distinguished Service Medal w/ one oak leaf cluster	Navy Distinguished Service Medal	Office of the Joint Chiefs of Staff Identification Badge
2nd Row	Army Distinguished Service Medal	Silver Star Medal	Legion of Merit w/ two 5/16" gold stars and Combat "V"	Bronze Star Medal w/ one 5/16" gold star and Combat "V"	Office of the Joint Chiefs of Staff Identification Badge
3rd Row	Joint Service Commendation Medal w/ one oak leaf cluster	Combat Action Ribbon (Vietnam)	Navy Presidential Unit Citation w/ one 3/16" bronze star	Army Presidential Unit Citation	Office of the Joint Chiefs of Staff Identification Badge
4th Row	Navy Unit Commendation	Navy Meritorious Unit Commendation w/ one 3/16" bronze star	China Service Medal	American Campaign Medal	Office of the Joint Chiefs of Staff Identification Badge
5th Row	Asiatic-Pacific Campaign Medal w/ one 3/16" bronze star	World War II Victory Medal	National Defense Service Medal w/ one 3/16" bronze star	Korean Service Medal w/ four 3/16" bronze stars	Office of the Joint Chiefs of Staff Identification Badge
6th Row	Vietnam Service Medal w/ four 3/16" bronze stars	National Order of Vietnam, Knight degree	Republic of Vietnam Gallantry Cross w/ two Palms	Republic of Korea Presidential Unit Citation	Office of the Joint Chiefs of Staff Identification Badge
7th Row	Republic of Vietnam Meritorious Unit Citation (Gallantry Cross) w/ Palm	Republic of Vietnam Meritorious Unit Citation (Civil Actions Medal) w/ Palm	United Nations Korea Medal	Republic of Vietnam Campaign Medal w/ 1960– Device	Office of the Joint Chiefs of Staff Identification Badge

== Post-military career ==
After Barrow's retirement from the Marine Corps, he was appointed by President Ronald Reagan to the Foreign Intelligence Advisory Board and to the president's Blue Ribbon Commission on Defense Management.

In 1983, a letter from Barrow to Caspar W. Weinberger was released by the Pentagon. In the letter, Barrow criticized Israeli soldiers in Lebanon, saying that the Israelis were firing on United States troops, among other things. Israel denied the charges.

Barrow's wife of 53 years, Patty, died in 2005.

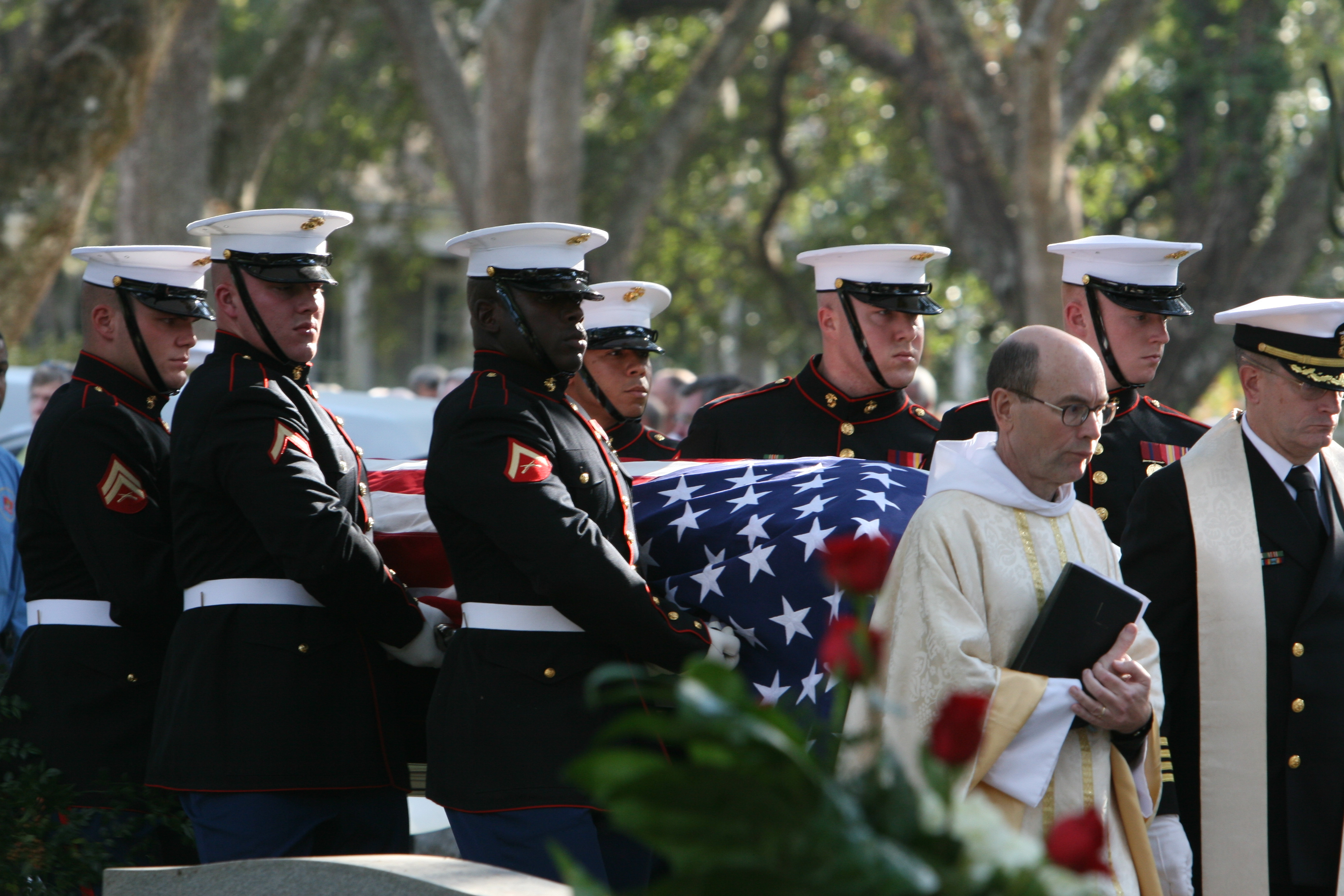
Funeral of General Robert H. Barrow.

Barrow died on October 30, 2008, at the age of 86. He was survived by his sons Charles C. Pulliam, of Greenville, South Carolina, and Robert H. Barrow, a retired lieutenant colonel of Marines, of Tampa, Florida; his daughters Cathleen P. Harmon, of Killeen, Texas, Barbara B. Kanegaye, of Houston, Texas, and Mary B. Hannigan, of Oakton, Virginia, eleven grandchildren, and five great-grandchildren.

Barrow was buried with full military honors on November 3, 2008. The service was held at Grace Episcopal Church and Cemetery in St. Francisville, the seat of West Feliciana Parish, Louisiana. The Commandant of the Marine Corps, General James T. Conway, delivered the eulogy, recognizing Barrow for his many initiatives ranging from recruiting to training; while former Commandant General Carl Mundy presented the burial colors to Barrow's next of kin.

== See also ==
- List of United States Marine Corps four-star generals
- List of Navy Cross recipients for the Korean War

Military offices
Preceded by Louis H. Wilson Jr.	Commandant of the Marine Corps; 1979–1983	Succeeded by Paul X. Kelley
Preceded by Samuel Jaskilka	Assistant Commandant of the Marine Corps; 1978–1979	Succeeded by Kenneth McLennan
