= Strategic Army Corps =

Former U.S. Army command with a mission of high readiness, active in the 1960s

- Country: United States of America
- Branch: United States Army
- Mottos: "Skilled, Tough. Ready Around the Clock."

Commanders
- Notable commanders: LTG Robert Frederick Sink; LTG Thomas J. H. Trapnell

The Strategic Army Corps (STRAC) was a command of the United States Army, with a mission of high readiness, active in the 1960s. In 1961 it was merged into the United States Strike Command (STRICOM). The word "STRAC" was also used to describe a well organized, well turned-out soldier or unit.

== Background ==
STRAC was a designation given to the XVIII Airborne Corps at Fort Bragg, North Carolina, in 1958. The designation was, in reality, the assignment of an additional mission rather than a true designation. The additional mission was to provide a flexible strike capability that could deploy worldwide on short notice without declaration of an emergency. The 4th Infantry Division at Fort Lewis, Washington, Combat Command A of the 1st Armored Division at Fort Hood, Texas, and the 101st Airborne Division at Fort Campbell, Kentucky, were designated as STRAC's first-line divisions, while the 1st Infantry Division at Fort Riley, Kansas, and the 82d Airborne Division at Fort Bragg were to provide backup in the event of general war. The 5th Logistical Command (later reflagged as 1st Logistics Command), also at Fort Bragg, would provide the corps with logistics support, while Fort Bragg's XVIII Airborne Corps Artillery would control artillery units.

Airlift assets were made available to U.S. forces based on the possible outbreak of a general war in Europe. In his paper, "Not War But Like War: The American Intervention in Lebanon", prepared for the Army Command and General Staff College's Combat Studies Institute, Roger J. Spiller notes:

The Military Air Transport Service could deliver up to 188 million ton-miles of mobility under the general war scenario, and it was calculated that the Army's part would come to 80 million ton-miles of the total. From these figures, the Army's Deputy Chief of Staff for Operations, Major General Earle Wheeler, made the assumption that 'if the general war requirement could be met, it would seem likely that the limited war requirement of the Army could be met in most circumstances.'

== Operations ==
Training included unidentified semi-annual maneuvers (Desert Strike, Swift Strike) with the 82nd and 101st Airborne held under the auspices of the XVIII and STRAC.

The 3d Armored Cavalry Regiment returned to the United States from Germany in February 1958, and was once again stationed at Fort Meade. The regiment became part of STRAC and, from 1958 to 1961, it was the recipient of four STRAC streamers, awarded for superior readiness and training. In reaction to the Berlin Crisis, the regiment redeployed to Germany in October 1961. Alerted for movement on 10 October, although scattered at different training sites along the Eastern Seaboard, the regiment arrived at its new duty stations of Baumholder and Kaiserslautern exactly thirty days later.

STRAC and the XVIII Airborne Corps provided the Army forces to the Navy's CINCLANT as unified commander during the 1962 Cuban Missile Crisis.

== Flexible response ==
In September 1961, Fort Hood again became the home for the III Corps, and in February 1962, III Corps was assigned as part of the STRAC.

In March 1962 the 2nd Infantry Division was designated as a Strategic Army Corps (STRAC) unit. Following this the Division became engaged in intensified combat training, tactical training, and field training exercises, in addition to special training designed to improve operational readiness.

== Limitations ==
Although the STRAC mission was to provide an easily deployable force for use in a limited war or other emergency, its ability to deploy overseas was limited by airlift constraints. Without the declaration of a national emergency, the required lift assets would not be released to support a STRAC deployment.

The Army faced problems with both the Air Force who would provide the expected transportation and from foreign governments for the expected use of their airspace and airports.

== Other definitions ==
STRAC is Army slang term for "a well organized, squared away soldier, (starched uniform, polished brass and spit-shined boots)"—a proud, competent trooper who can be depended on for good performance in any circumstance. The word was used both as a noun and an adjective for a soldier whose gear was clean and tight; weapon clean and ready; mind clear, organized, and ready for action. S: skilled T: tough R: ready A: around the C: clock—STRAC. Another version defined the acronym as "Sharp Trooper, Ready Around the Clock". However, some soldiers joked it stood for "Shit! The Russians Are Coming!"

By the GWOT era, STRAC had evolved into a cautionary tale, and usage of the adjective was primarily used pejoratively to describe instances of overemphasizing polish over training, appearance over competence.

== See also ==
- Rapid Deployment Joint Task Force
- United States Central Command
