= Kenneth McLennan =

United States Marine Corps general

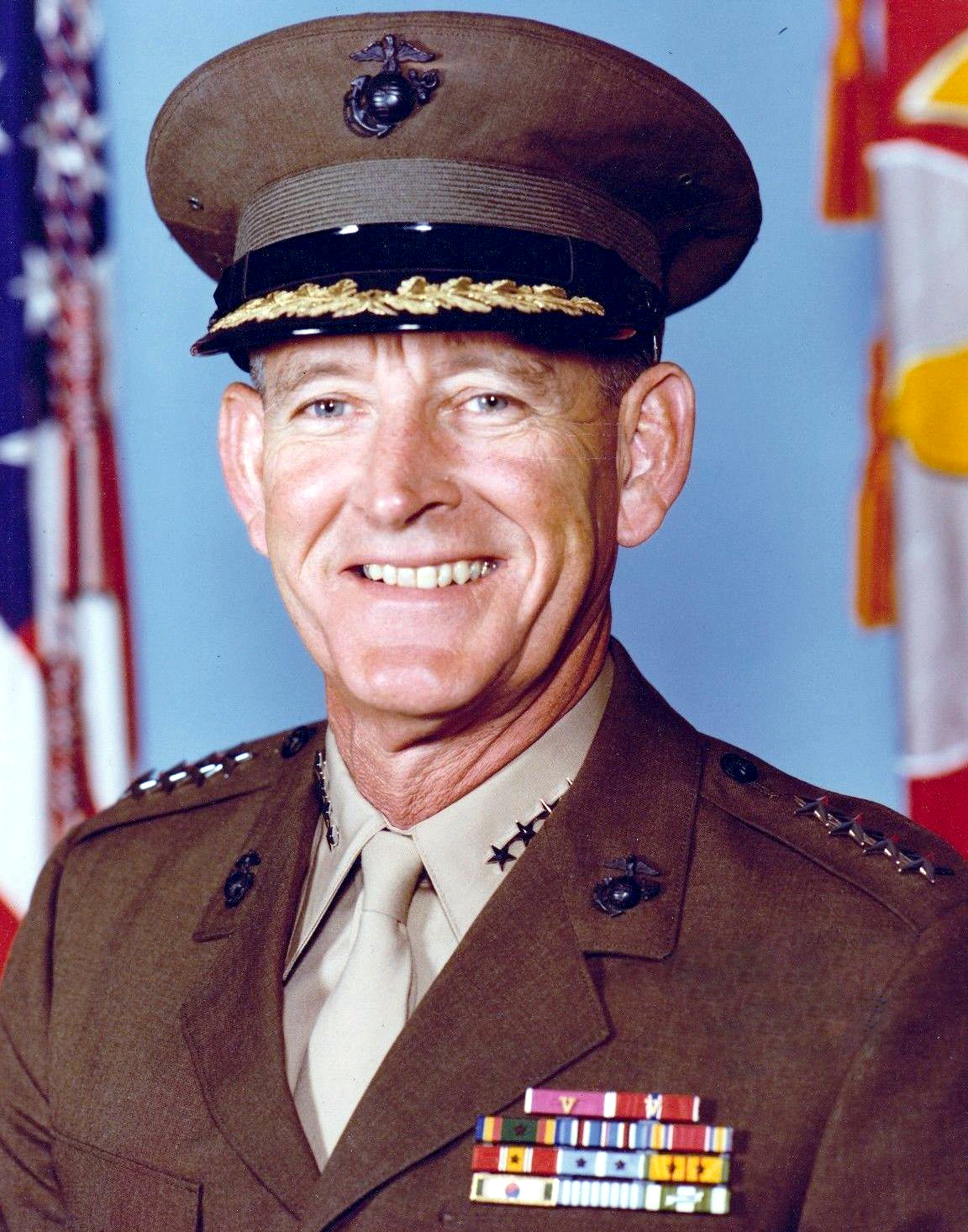
- General Kenneth McLennan, USMC
- Born: May 31, 1925; Vancouver, British Columbia, Canada
- Died: September 20, 2005 (aged 80); San Diego County, California, U.S.
- Burial place: cremated and his ashes were scattered at sea
- Military career
- Allegiance: United States of America
- Branch: United States Marine Corps
- Service years: 1943–1981
- Rank: General
- Commands: Assistant Commandant of the Marine Corps; 2nd Marine Division; Camp H. M. Smith; 1st Battalion, 9th Marines; 3rd Battalion, 5th Marines
- Conflicts: Korean War; Vietnam War
- Awards: Distinguished Service Medal; Legion of Merit; Bronze Star
- Other work: Marine Corps Association, President

Kenneth McLennan (May 31, 1925 – September 20, 2005) was a decorated U.S. Marine General. He is most noted for his service as the Assistant Commandant of the United States Marine Corps from 1979 to 1981. In recognition of his distinguished service as Assistant Commandant and Chief of Staff, he was presented the Distinguished Service Medal by the Commandant of the Marine Corps upon his retirement on July 1, 1981.

== Marine Corps career ==
Kenneth McLennan was born on May 31, 1925, in Vancouver, B.C., Canada. In 1943, he graduated from Lowell High School in San Francisco, California. He was a esteemed cadet in Lowell High School's Army Junior Reserve Officer Training Corps there. He received his Bachelor of Science degree in Business Administration from the University of San Francisco in 1948. He also holds an M.B.A. degree in transportation management from the University of California at Los Angeles (1961).

McLennan enlisted in the Marine Corps Reserve in January 1943 and was commissioned a second lieutenant on July 18, 1945. He was promoted to first lieutenant in July 1948, while on inactive duty status and was recalled to active duty in March 1951.

From March to June 1951, McLennan underwent training at Camp Pendleton, California. He attended the Special Basic Officers School at Quantico, Virginia, from July to November 1951, and in December began a tour as a recruit company commander at Marine Corps Recruit Depot in San Diego, California. He was promoted to captain in June 1952.

McLennan participated in combat operations in Korea as the S-4 Officer, 3rd Battalion, 5th Marine Regiment, 1st Marine Division from January to July 1953. He later served as Commanding Officer, Company I, 3rd Battalion, 5th Marines and as Assistant S-3 Officer, 5th Marines. He integrated into the regular Marine Corps in March 1953. He returned to the United States in February 1954, and served as Assistant Division Embarkation Officer, 2nd Marine Division at Camp Lejeune, North Carolina, until June 1955, when he was transferred to Salt Lake City, Utah, as Inspector-Instructor, 21st Rifle Company, USMCR. He was promoted to major in July 1956, and, in August 1957, he attended the Amphibious Warfare School Junior Course at Quantico, graduating in July 1958.

From August 1958 until June 1961, McLennan was a Marine Officer Instructor with the Naval Reserve Officer Training Unit, at the University of California at Los Angeles. He was reassigned to Camp Pendleton in June 1961 and served as S-4, and later as S-3 Officer, 5th Marines. He also commanded the 3d Battalion, 7th Marines, prior to his transfer to Okinawa in April 1963, where he served as Commanding Officer, 1st Battalion, 9th Marine Regiment, 3rd Marine Division. He was promoted to lieutenant colonel in July 1963. Upon his return to the United States he commanded the 3rd Battalion, 5th Marines.

McLennan was then assigned as the Director, Services Division, and later, Head, Warehouse and Traffic Branch, Material Division, Marine Corps Supply Center in Albany, Georgia, from June 1964 to July 1966. In June 1967, he completed the Naval War College Newport, Rhode Island, and was ordered to Headquarters Marine Corps, Washington, D.C., as Head, General Training Section, Training and Education Branch, G-3 Division. He was promoted to colonel in July 1968 and assigned as Head, Operations Branch G-3 Division.

He was assigned as Division Inspector, 3rd Marine Division, on Okinawa in December 1969, and also was Chief of Staff, 11th Marine Expeditionary Brigade. From May to December 1970, he served in Vietnam as Deputy G-4, and later, as Assistant Chief of Staff, G-4, III Marine Amphibious Force. He was reassigned in December 1970 as Assistant G-4 (Plans Officer), Headquarters, Fleet Marine Force, Pacific, and subsequently became Commanding Officer, Camp H.M. Smith, in Hawaii.

Following his advancement to brigadier general in September 1972, McLennan became Marine Corps Liaison Officer (OP-09M), in the Office of the Chief of Naval Operations, Washington, D.C. He remained in that post until June 1974 when he became Director, Manpower Plans and Policy Division at Headquarters Marine Corps, Washington, D.C. He was advanced to major general on July 3, 1975, and was assigned as the Commanding General, 2nd Marine Division on June 30, 1976. McLennan relinquished command of 2nd MARDIV to major general Edward J . Bronars on 17 May 1978. He was assigned as the Deputy Chief of Staff for Manpower, Headquarters Marine Corps on July 1, 1978. McLennan assumed duties as the Assistant Commandant of the Marine Corps and Chief of Staff on July 1, 1979. He was promoted to general on July 2, 1979. He served in this capacity until his retirement on July 1, 1981, one of the last Marines still on active duty who were World War II veterans. While Assistant Commandant, McLennan also served as president of the Marine Corps Association (the professional association for Marines).

McLennan died as a result of lung cancer on September 20, 2005, at the age of 80. He was cremated and his ashes scattered at sea.

== Decorations and awards ==
McLennan's personal decorations and awards include:

| 1st Row | Navy Distinguished Service Medal | Legion of Merit with Combat "V" | Bronze Star Medal with Combat "V" |
| 2nd Row | Navy Unit Commendation with one award star | American Campaign Medal | World War II Victory Medal |
| 3rd Row | National Defense Service Medal with one star | Korean Service Medal with two 3/16 inch bronze service stars | Vietnam Service Medal with two 3/16 inch bronze service stars |
| 4th Row | Korean Presidential Unit Citation | United Nations Korea Medal | Vietnam Campaign Medal |

== See also ==
- Commandant of the Marine Corps
- List of United States Marine Corps four-star generals

== Notes ==
Military offices
| Preceded by Robert H. Barrow | Assistant Commandant of the Marine Corps; July 1, 1979 - July 30, 1981 | Succeeded by Paul X. Kelley |
| Preceded by William G. Joslyn | Commanding General, 2nd Marine Division; July 1, 1976 - May 17, 1978 | Succeeded by Edward J. Bronars |
