= Theodore J. Conway =

United States Army general

- Conway in 1966
- Born: 24 July 1909; Vallejo, California, United States
- Died: 11 September 1990 (aged 81); Tampa, Florida, United States
- Burial place: San Francisco National Cemetery, California, United States
- Military career
- Allegiance: United States
- Branch: United States Army
- Service years: 1927–1929; 1933–1969
- Rank: General
- Unit: Infantry Branch
- Commands: Strike Command; 82nd Airborne Division; Seventh Army
- Conflicts: World War II; Dieppe Raid; Cold War
- Awards: Distinguished Service Medal; Legion of Merit (2); Bronze Star Medal (3)

Theodore John Conway (24 July 1909 – 11 September 1990) was a United States Army four-star general who served as Commander in Chief, United States Strike Command/U.S. Commander in Chief, Middle East, Africa south of the Sahara, and South Asia (USCINCSTRIKE/USCINCMEAFSA) from 1966 to 1969. Conway graduated from the United States Military Academy in 1933. In addition to Strike Command, Conway also commanded the 82nd Airborne Division and later the United States Seventh Army in N.A.T.O. He was promoted to four star rank on 1 November 1966, and retired from the army in 1969.

== Early life ==
Conway was born in Vallejo, California, on 24 July 1909, the son of Theodore Allen Barnewitz and Ruth Irene Quinn. Conway's father died when he was 5, and his mother subsequently married U.S. Army Captain William L. Conway.

== Military career ==
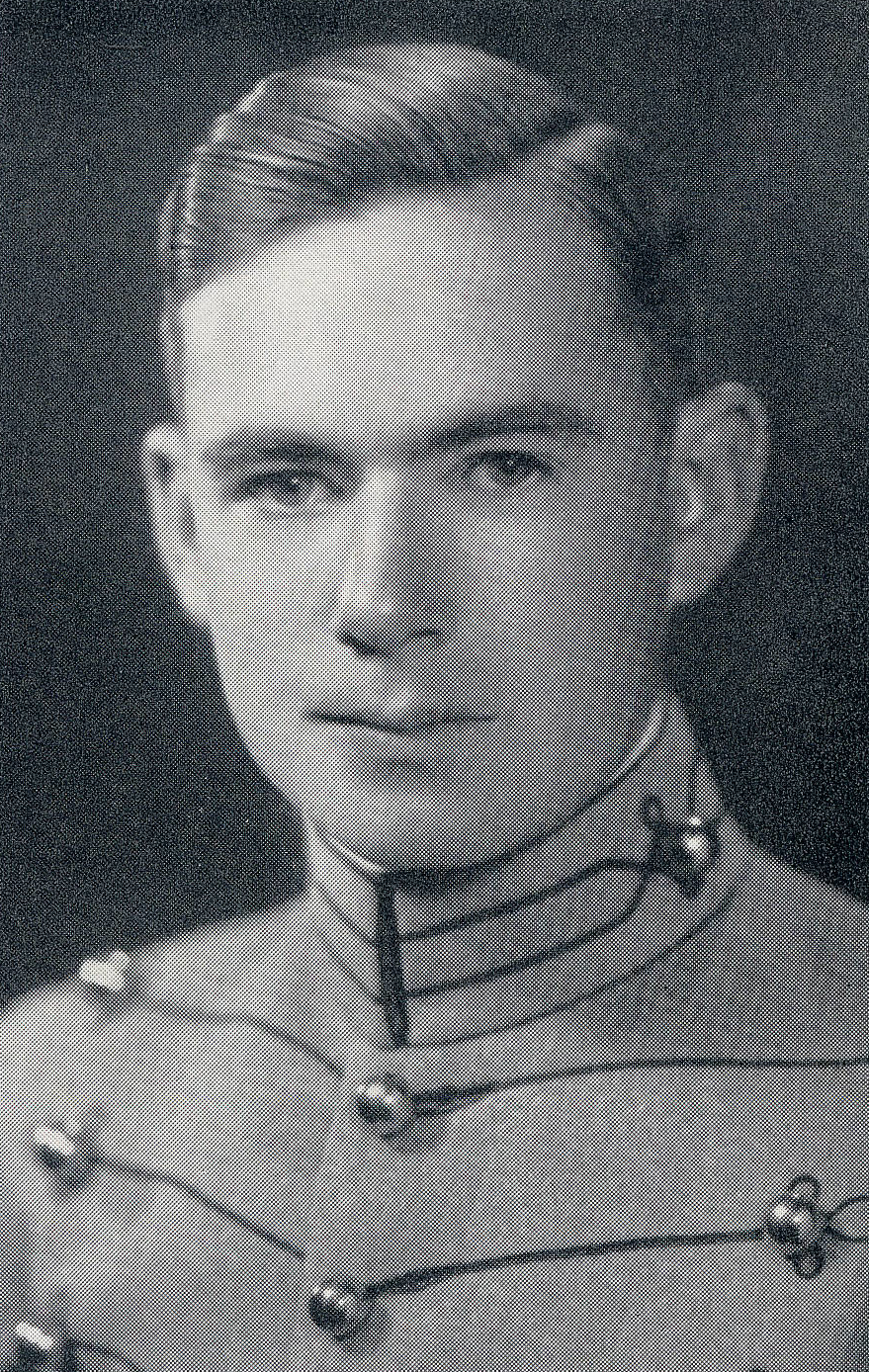
Conway as a United States Military Academy cadet c. 1933

Conway graduated from Galileo High School in San Francisco in 1927. He enlisted in the Army as a private at the Presidio of San Francisco and in 1929 received an appointment to West Point from Richard J. Welch, 5th Congressional District, California. At West Point, Conway displayed the qualities that would become his hallmark in later years: well-rounded, industrious, good-natured, understanding. Upon graduating from USMA class of 1933, Conway reported to Fort Benning, Georgia in the fall and soon married Eleanor Mitchell Wright in 1935. In 1937-38 he was detailed to Paris as a language student, then sent to West Point for three years as a French instructor.

== World War II ==
During World War II, Conway held a succession of key assignments, starting in London in 1942, then in North Africa, Sicily, Italy, Southern France, and back to Italy, where he finished the war with the Fifth United States Army near Verona in Northern Italy.

During that period he served with the 9th Infantry Division, VI Army Corps, and Headquarters, Fifth US Army. His service included battalion and regimental command and duty as aide-de-camp to British General Sir Harold Alexander. He was also one of the American officers who planned the Commando raid at Dieppe and participated as a shipboard observer on the British destroyer Alderney during that operation.

== Post-War ==
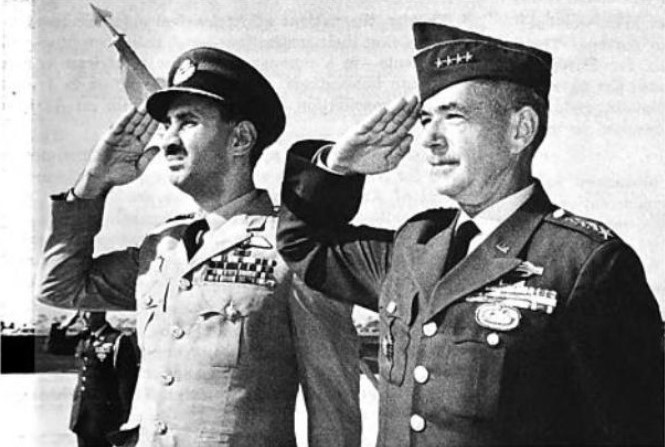
Air Marshal Nur Khan and Gen. T. J. Conway, salute the colors during Khan's arrival ceremony on the MacDill AFB flightline, October 1968

After the war, he was assigned to the Strategic Plans Branch of Operations Division (OPD). In 1948, Conway attended the Armed Forces Staff College and then served as instructor, returning to Washington in 1950 to attend the National War College.

At the age of 43, Conway attended the Army Airborne School and qualified as a parachutist before reporting to Fort Campbell to command the 188th Airborne Infantry Regiment. Later he became chief of staff of the 11th Airborne Division. He served next with a NATO command, Allied Land Forces, Central Europe (ALFCE), with headquarters at Fontainebleau, France.

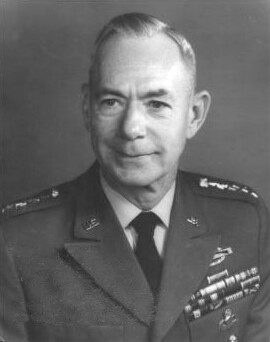
Four Star General Theodore J. Conway

Returning to the Pentagon in 1955, Conway was promoted to brigadier general and served as Director of Army Research. In 1959-60 he was with Korean Military Advisory Group (KMAG) in Wonju, Korea. In 1961 he was promoted to major general and assumed command of the 82^{d} Airborne Division. In 1962 he was posted to Bangkok as chief, U.S. Advisory Group, Thailand, and in 1963 to Seoul, South Korea, where he was promoted to lieutenant general and became deputy commanding general, Eighth U.S. Army.

Back to the Pentagon in 1965, Conway became Assistant Chief of Staff for Force Development. Upon leaving this assignment he became commanding general of the Seventh United States Army Europe in Germany.

His final active-duty assignment followed his promotion to full general in the summer of 1966, when he served as commander-in-chief of the U.S. Strike Command, headquartered at MacDill Air Force Base near Tampa, Florida. He was concurrently commander-in-chief, Middle East, Southern Asia and Africa South of the Sahara. During this period he was honored as the Kermit Roosevelt Exchange Lecturer to the United Kingdom for 1969.

Conway retired in July 1969, having completed more than 42 years of service. He then took an M.A. in international relations at the University of South Florida in 1975 followed by a PhD in military history from Duke University in 1985 at the age of 75. Conway died of cancer on 11 September 1990, and was buried in San Francisco National Cemetery.

== Decorations ==
Conway's decorations included the Legion of Merit with Oak Leaf Cluster; Bronze Star Medal with two Oak Leaf Clusters; French Legion of Honor; French Croix de Guerre with Palm; Czechoslovak Military Cross; Polish Golden Cross of Merit with Swords; Order of the British Empire; Order of the Crown of Italy; and the Army Distinguished Service Medal (US).

== Family life ==
Ted and Eleanor Conway had three children, Laura Mitchell Conway, Ruth Quinn Conway and John Wright Conway. John, a veteran of Vietnam (3d Brigade, 82d Airborne Division), was killed in a parachute accident in 1977.

His Army remembrance recalls "a dedicated professional soldier, a man who truly 'filled the unforgiving minute with sixty seconds' worth of distance run.' Yet no less significant were the human and humane qualities of this warm and generous man – his enthusiasm, his keen sense of unfailingly good humor, even in the face of adversity, his attributes as a cherished son, husband, father, comrade and friend. In these respects, no less than for his brilliant career, he is a shining light in the memories of those who knew him."

In addition to his military and academic honors, Conway was one of the few members of the U.S. Armed Forces to have held both the lowest rank of Private and the highest regular rank of full General in the Army. In 1985, at age 87, he became the oldest person to receive a doctorate from Duke University. He was also a licensed amateur radio operator (W4EII) proficient in Morse code, as well as a runner, tennis player, and skydiver.
