= Fred K. Mahaffey =

United States Army general (1934–1986)

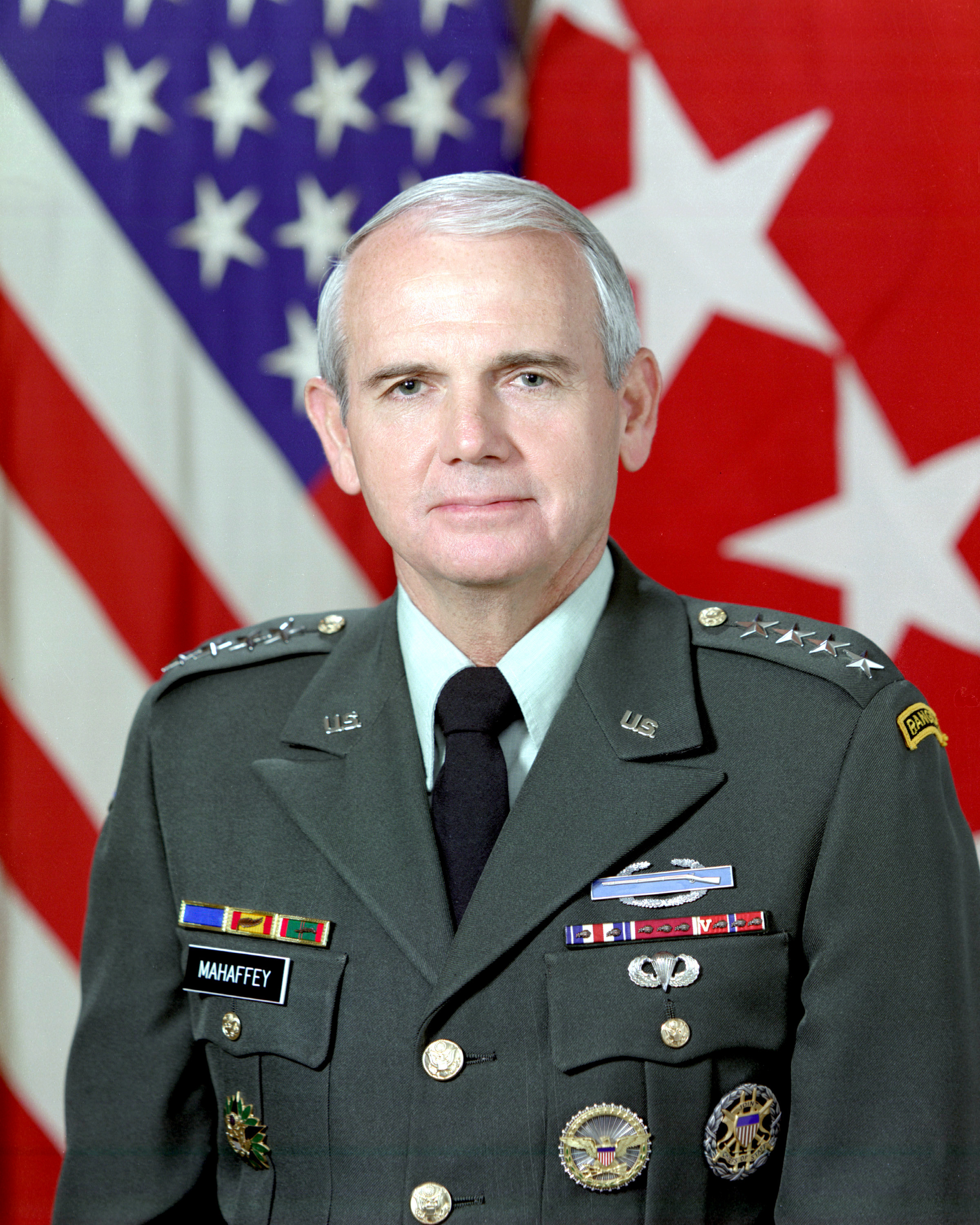
- Mahaffey in 1985
- Born: 4 January 1934; Clovis, New Mexico, US
- Died: 13 October 1986 (aged 52); Washington, D.C., US
- Burial place: Arlington National Cemetery
- Military career
- Allegiance: United States of America
- Branch: United States Army
- Service years: 1955–1986
- Rank: General
- Commands: Readiness Command; 3rd Infantry Division
- Conflicts: Vietnam War
- Awards: Defense Distinguished Service Medal (4); Distinguished Service Medal (2); Silver Star (3); Legion of Merit (4); Distinguished Flying Cross (2); Bronze Star (4)

Fred Keith Mahaffey (4 January 1934 – 13 October 1986) was a United States Army four-star general who served as Commander in Chief, United States Readiness Command (USCINCRED) from 1985 to 1986 before dying of cancer.

== Early life, education, and athletic career ==
Mahaffey was born on 4 January 1934, in Clovis, New Mexico.

A football and track star at Carlsbad High School in Carlsbad, New Mexico and at the University of Denver, Mahaffey put University of Denver football on the map in 1954. Mahaffey's name still dots Denver's record book. An honorable mention All-Skyline Conference member in 1953, Mahaffey broke out in 1954, rushing for 813 yards and 12 touchdowns while earning All-America and first-team All-Skyline Conference honors. Finishing ninth in the country in rushing yards, he and teammate Fred Tesone formed one of the top rushing tandems in the nation as the two combined for 2,528 yards, outrushing their opponents by over a 2-to-1 margin and helping the Pioneers to a 9–1 record, the first outright conference championship since 1917 and the second-best season in school history. He is the school's all-time leader in rushing yards (1,605), touchdowns (27) and points (163) and ranks second in all-purpose yards (2,942) and third in total yards from scrimmage (1,788).

== Military career ==
When he graduated from the University of Denver in 1955, he was commissioned as an officer in the US Army. He later earned his master's degree in International Affairs at George Washington University's Elliott School of International Affairs.

Mahaffey went on to a distinguished military career, one that saw him earn three Silver Stars, two Distinguished Flying Crosses and four Bronze Stars for valor in combat and a Distinguished Service Medal, the Army's highest non-combat award. He commanded a battalion in the 9th Infantry Division during the Vietnam War. In 1975 he assumed command the 2nd Brigade of the 101st Airborne Division. He was succeeded in command of the 2nd Brigade by a fellow future four-star general, then-Colonel Colin Powell. He also commanded the 3rd Infantry Division from 1981 to 1983.

Mahaffey's other assignments included Division Operations Officer for the 101st Airborne Division, Assistant Commandant of the United States Army Infantry School; Deputy Commanding General of the Combined Arms Combat Development Activity; and Deputy Chief of Staff for operations for the Army.

Mahaffey was promoted to four star rank in 1985 at the age of 51, making him one of the youngest four-star generals ever.

== Death and burial ==
Diagnosed with cancer while on active duty, he died at Walter Reed Army Medical Center on 13 October 1986, at the age of 52. Mahaffey was buried in Arlington National Cemetery. He was survived by his wife, the former Jane Garrett, and four daughters: Lorrie, Selene, Julie, and Melissa. A memorial to him can be found engraved in stone in Carlsbad Beach in Carlsbad, New Mexico.

== Honors ==
On 16 May 1989, the headquarters building of the 3rd Infantry Division was dedicated in his honor. He was posthumously inducted into the Ranger Hall of Fame. Mahaffey was also inducted posthumously into the University of Denver Athletic Hall of Fame.

The old Fort Campbell High School building, which is now Mahaffey Middle School, is named for him.

== Awards and decorations ==
His awards and decorations included the following:

Badge	Combat Infantryman Badge		
1st row	Defense Distinguished Service Medal with 3 Oak leaf clusters (4 awards)		
2nd row	Distinguished Service Medal with 1 Oak leaf cluster (2 awards)	Silver Star with 2 Oak leaf clusters (3 awards)	Legion of Merit with 3 Oak leaf clusters (4 awards)
3rd row	Distinguished Flying Cross with 1 Oak leaf cluster (2 awards)	Bronze Star with "V" device and 3 Oak leaf clusters (4 awards, 1 for Valor)	Meritorious Service Medal
4th row	Air Medal with Award numeral 16	Army Commendation Medal with "V" device and 1 Oak leaf cluster (2 awards, 1 for valor)	National Defense Service Medal with 1 Service star
5th row	Vietnam Service Medal with 1 silver Campaign star	Army Service Ribbon	Army Overseas Service Ribbon with Award numeral 3
6th row	South Vietnamese Gallantry Cross with palm and 1 bronze star	RVN Armed Forces Honor Medal	Vietnam Campaign Medal with "60-" clasp
Badges	Basic Parachutist Badge	Air Assault Badge	Ranger Tab
Unit citations	Army Presidential Unit Citation	Vietnam Gallantry Cross Unit Citation	Vietnam Civil Actions Medal Unit Citation
Badges	Army Staff Identification Badge	Office of the Secretary of Defense Identification Badge	Joint Chiefs of Staff Identification Badge
