= James J. Lindsay =

American general (1932–2023)

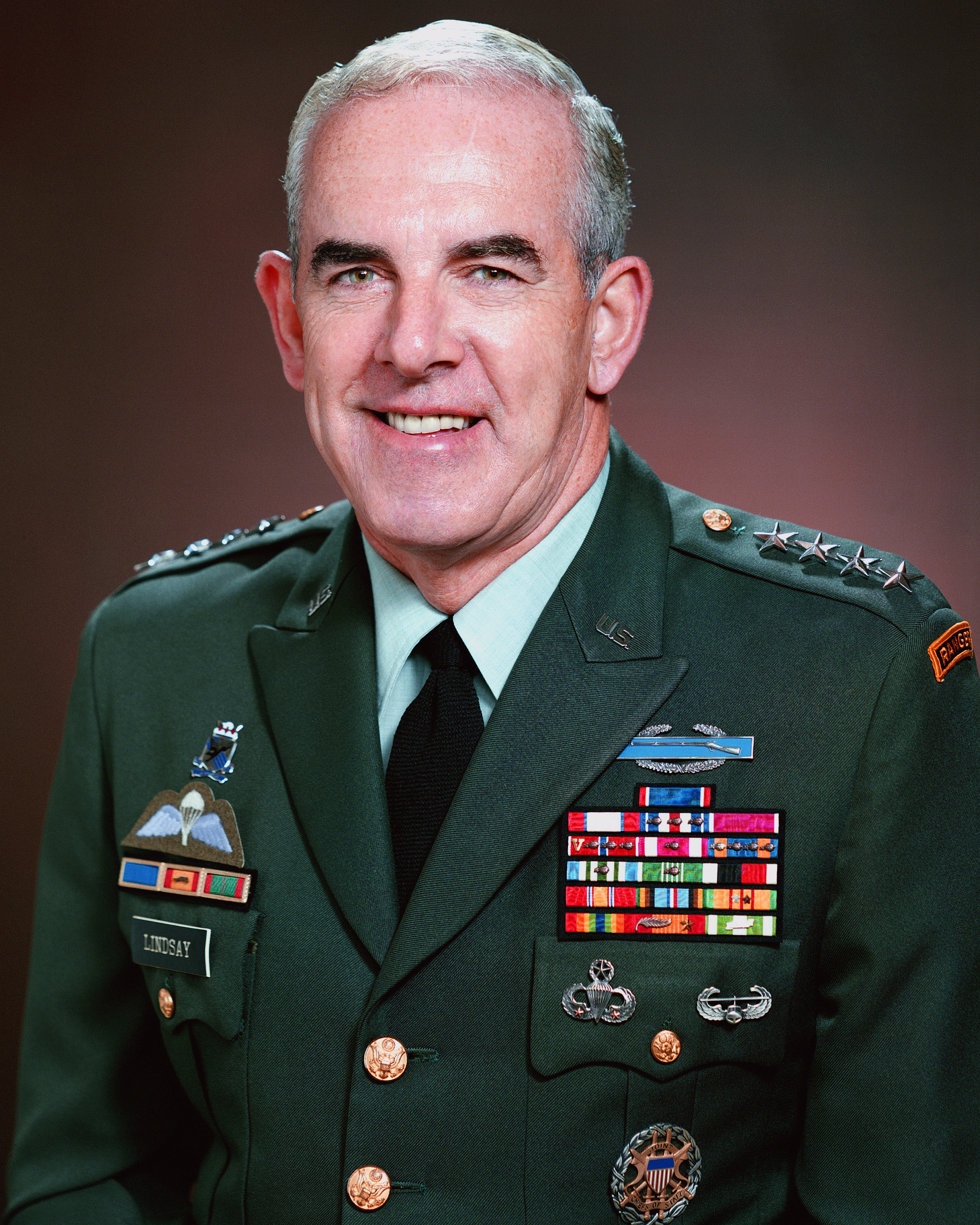
- Lindsay in 1986
- Born: 10 October 1932; Portage, Wisconsin, U.S.
- Died: 6 August 2023 (aged 90); Vass, North Carolina, U.S.
- Military career
- Allegiance: United States
- Branch: United States Army
- Service years: 1952–1990
- Rank: General
- Commands: United States Special Operations Command; United States Readiness Command; XVIII Airborne Corps; United States Army Infantry School; 82nd Airborne Division; 2nd Battalion, 60th Infantry Regiment
- Conflicts: Vietnam War
- Awards: Distinguished Service Cross; Army Distinguished Service Medal; Silver Star (4); Legion of Merit; Bronze Star Medal (4)

James Joseph Lindsay (10 October 1932 – 6 August 2023) was a United States Army four-star general, and served as the first commander of the United States Special Operations Command.

== Military career ==
Lindsay's military career began when he enlisted in the Army in 1952. He graduated from the U.S. Army Officer Candidate School in May 1953 as a Second Lieutenant in the Infantry. His military education includes the Infantry Officer Advanced Course, Army Language School (German and Russian) the US Marine Corps Command and Staff College and the National War College. He earned a bachelor's degree from the University of Nebraska at Omaha and a Master of Science degree in Foreign Affairs from George Washington University.

Lindsay commanded units at all levels, from platoon through MACOM, in both peacetime and war. His first assignments were with the 82nd Airborne Division, 7th Special Forces Group and Military Intelligence. Within the 82nd Airborne Division he held eight assignments, from platoon to division level. During the Vietnam War, he was an advisor to the Vietnamese Airborne Brigade, commanded the 2nd Battalion, 60th Infantry Regiment, 9th Infantry Division and was the G3 (Assistant Chief-of-Staff, Operations and Plans) for the 9th Infantry Division.

As a general, Lindsay commanded the 82nd Airborne Division, the United States Army Infantry School, the XVIII Airborne Corps, the United States Readiness Command, and was the first Commander in Chief, United States Special Operations Command. General Lindsay retired 1 July 1990.

== Post military ==
In retirement, Lindsay founded the Airborne and Special Operations Museum Foundation in 1990. He served as a senior mentor for the Army's Battle Command Training Program (BCTP) from 1990 to 2009. He was inducted into both the United States Army Ranger Hall of Fame and the Officer Candidate School Hall of Fame. He was the 1996 recipient of the National Infantry Association's Doughboy Award and the 1998 recipient of the United States Special Operations Command's Bull Simons Award.

== Personal life and death ==
Lindsay and his wife, Gerry, lived in Vass, North Carolina. Their children included Steven, Michael, Kevin, and Barbara.

James J. Lindsay died on 5 August 2023, at the age of 90.

== Awards and decorations ==
=== Distinguished Service Cross ===
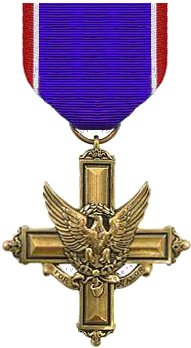

James Joseph Lindsay
Rank and organization: Lieutenant Colonel, U.S. Army, 2nd Battalion, 60th Infantry Regiment, 9th Infantry Division
Place and date: Republic of Vietnam, 31 May to 4 June 1968
Entered service at: Portage, Wisconsin
Born: 10 October 1932, Portage, Wisconsin
G.O. No.: 461, 10 February 1969

Citation:

The President of the United States of America, authorized by Act of Congress, 9 July 1918 (amended by act of 25 July 1963), takes pleasure in presenting the Distinguished Service Cross to Lieutenant Colonel (Infantry) James Joseph Lindsay (ASN: 0-75235), United States Army, for extraordinary heroism in connection with military operations involving conflict with an armed hostile force in the Republic of Vietnam, while serving with Headquarters, 2d Battalion, 60th Infantry, 1st Brigade, 9th Infantry Division. Lieutenant Colonel Lindsay distinguished himself by exceptionally valorous actions from 31 May to 4 June 1968 during an operation which located and destroyed three main force Viet Cong and North Vietnamese battalions in the Plain of Reeds. After two days of tracking the enemy, Colonel Lindsay accompanied his battalion as it was inserted by air into the flank of the communists. Immediately upon landing, his men were brought under extremely heavy automatic weapons and small arms fire from a nearby woodline. Moving from position to position under the hail of bullets, he directed his troops' fire and, once fire superiority had been gained, led an assault into the hostile bunker complex which destroyed sixty of the fortifications and forced the enemy to withdraw. He then entered his helicopter and flew low over the embattled area to direct the encirclement of the foe. Noticing a group of Viet Cong escaping across a small canal which had not yet been sealed off, he stopped them with hand grenades and rifle fire. After returning to the ground, he exposed himself to the vicious enemy fusillade to coordinate return fire which repelled the enemy's attempt to break the encirclement. While leading a sweep through the woodline early in the morning of 4 June, he surprised three Viet Cong whom he engaged and killed before they could inflict any casualties upon his men. Lieutenant Colonel Lindsay's extraordinary heroism and devotion to duty were in keeping with the highest traditions of the military service and reflect great credit upon himself, his unit, and the United States Army.

=== Commendations ===
General Lindsay's awards and decorations include:

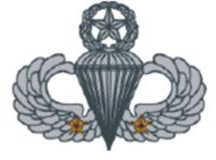

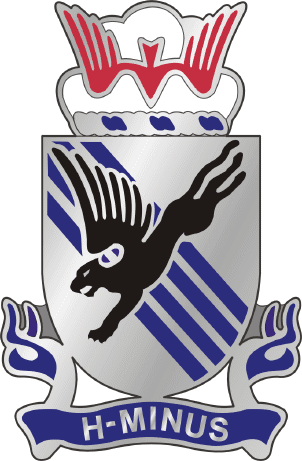

Badge	Combat Infantryman Badge		
1st Row	Distinguished Service Cross		
2nd Row	Distinguished Service Medal	Silver Star with 3 Oak leaf clusters	Legion of Merit
3rd Row	Bronze Star with "V" device and 3 Oak leaf clusters	Meritorious Service Medal with 1 Oak leaf cluster	Air Medal with Award numeral 9
4th Row	Joint Service Commendation Medal with 1 Oak leaf cluster	Army Commendation Medal with 1 Oak leaf cluster	Army of Occupation Medal
5th Row	National Defense Service Medal with 1 Service star	Armed Forces Expeditionary Medal	Vietnam Service Medal with 1 silver and 1 bronze Campaign stars
6th Row	Army Service Ribbon	Vietnamese Gallantry Cross with palm and 1 Gold Star	Vietnam Campaign Medal with "60-" clasp
Badges	Master Parachutist Badge with 2 combat jump stars	Air Assault Badge	Ranger Tab
Badges	505th Infantry Regiment distinctive unit insignia	British Parachutist Badge	Joint Chiefs of Staff Identification Badge
Unit awards	Army Presidential Unit Citation	Gallantry Cross Unit Citation	Vietnam Civil Actions Unit Citation
