= Attorney General Warner =

Attorney General Warner may refer to:

- Aucher Warner (1859–1944), Attorney-General of Trinidad and Tobago
- Joseph E. Warner (Massachusetts politician) (1884–1958), Attorney General of Massachusetts

== See also ==
- General Warner (disambiguation)
