= Rapid Deployment Joint Task Force =

Former U.S. DoD Joint Task Force (1980-83)

- Dates active: 1 March 1980 – 1 January 1983
- Allegiance: United States
- Headquarters: MacDill AFB, Florida, U.S.
- Part of: U.S. Readiness Command
- Wars: the Cold War

The Rapid Deployment Joint Task Force (RDJTF) is an inactive United States Department of Defense Joint Task Force. It was first envisioned as a three-division force in 1979 as the Rapid Deployment Force (RDF), a highly mobile rapid deployment force that could be rapidly moved to locations outside the normal overseas deployments in Europe and Korea. Its charter was expanded and greatly strengthened in 1980 as the RDJTF. It was inactivated in 1983, and re-organized as the United States Central Command (USCENTCOM).

After the end of American involvement in the Vietnam War, U.S. attention gradually focused on the Persian Gulf region. The Yom Kippur War of 1973, the Soviet–U.S. confrontation, and the subsequent 1973 oil crisis led to President Richard Nixon issuing a warning that "American military intervention to protect vital oil supplies" was a possibility, served to increase attention on the area as being vital to U.S. national interests.

== History ==
=== The Carter Doctrine ===
With the new administration elected in 1977, President Jimmy Carter signed Presidential Review Memorandum (PRM) 10, which undertook an evaluation of US strategy. The President signed Presidential Directive (PD) 18 on August 24, 1977, a part of which called for the establishment of a mobile force capable of responding to worldwide contingencies that would not divert forces from the North Atlantic Treaty Organization (NATO) or Korea. In 1978, three Army divisions (the 9th, 82nd, and 101st) and one Marine division were earmarked for such duties. There were however no substantial funds allocated and it remained a paper exercise.

There were several reasons why the move to a Rapid Deployment Force did not occur in the 1970s. Unlike previous Cold War administrations, the US foreign and defense policies under President Carter saw retrenchment, not intervention in foreign affairs. Also, the Carter Administration had NATO as its focus with conventional force policy as a result of the buildup of Warsaw Pact forces. Domestically, there were many objections from the Congress and the media with regards to the use of United States military forces in the wake of the Vietnam War. Neither the Army, Air Force, Navy, or Marines were enthusiastic about the establishment of another limited contingency organization.

A concerted effort to establish the envisioned force was not made until world events in 1979 ended the post-Vietnam malaise in the United States after the Fall of Saigon. The 1979 SALT II agreement with the Soviet Union led to a vigorous debate (and subsequent rejection by Congress of the treaty) which illustrated how far the United States military had fallen into disrepair during the 1970s. The 1979 Iranian Revolution; the 1979 energy crisis; the April 1980 failure of Operation Eagle Claw to rescue United States diplomatic personnel from Tehran, and the 1979 acknowledgment of a Soviet Ground Forces combat brigade in Cuba reinforced the appearance of weakness.

However, even before the 4 November 1979 seizure of the U.S. embassy in Tehran by a group of Islamist students and militants in support of the Iranian Revolution, President Carter announced the establishment of the Rapid Deployment Force. The RDF concept was to develop a mobile strike force of Army, United States Navy, Marine and Air Force elements that could independently operate without the use of established forward bases or the facilities of friendly nations globally. The orientation of the RDF, however, was on the Middle East. The Soviet invasion of Afghanistan at the end of 1979 also strengthened the case for the force.

This statement was followed-up in Carter's 1980 State of the Union address when he announced that any attempt by a foreign power to gain control of the Persian Gulf and surrounding area would be regarded as an attack on the vital interests of the United States, and be stopped by all means necessary including the use of military force. This was the first formal commitment of US military power to the region.

=== Rapid Deployment Joint Task Force ===
The Rapid Deployment Joint Task Force (RDJTF), as the organization was officially designated, was activated on 1 March 1980 at MacDill Air Force Base, Florida. The RDJTF was established as a part of U.S. Readiness Command (REDCOM) and initially commanded by Lieutenant General Paul X. Kelley, USMC. The mission of the RDJTF was that of deterrence—against possible Soviet or proxy invasion, conflict among the states of the area and subversion and insurrection within the states and thus "help maintain regional stability and the Gulf oil-flow westward".

The RDJTF was planned from the beginning to be highly mobile, its components to be drawn from central pool of resources allocated by the combined services as required to meet mission objectives and the nature of the specific threat to US interests.

Initially conceived as a force with a global orientation, the RDF soon focused its attention and planning to the Persian Gulf region. This narrowing of emphasis was precipitated by the Soviet invasion of Afghanistan on 26 December 1979 and the subsequent announcement of the Carter Doctrine which stated that because of its oil fields, the Persian Gulf area was of vital interest to the United States, and that any outside attempt to gain control in the area would be "repelled by use of any means necessary, including military force."

Thus, the 1980 RDJTF area of responsibility included Egypt, Sudan, Djibouti, Ethiopia, Kenya, Somalia, Afghanistan, Bahrain, Iran, Iraq, Kuwait, Oman, Pakistan, the People's Republic of Yemen, Qatar, Saudi Arabia, United Arab Emirates, and the Yemen Arab Republic.

The Commander of RDJTF was a three star position, first held by General P.X. Kelley and then by General Robert Kingston, USA (the commander alternated between the Army and Marine Corps). The Deputy Commander was usually an Air Force two star general officer.

Its command staff was drawn from all four armed services. Component commanders of RDJTF consisted of:

- Army Force Commander (ARFORCOM) (Commander, XVIII Airborne Corps)
- Navy Force Commander (NAVFORCOM) (Assistant Chief of Staff for Planning, United States Pacific Fleet)
- Air Force Force Commander (AFFORCOM) (Commander, Ninth Air Force, Tactical Air Command)
- Marine Force Commander (MARFORCOM) (who was subordinated to NAVFORCOM, and Commander, 1st Marine Division)

A Washington Liaison Office also existed.

In the event a conflict had occurred these personnel would have controlled deployment and operations and been augmented by around 200 personnel from REDCOM and another 250 if they were to go to a remote area. The headquarters at MacDill AFB in Tampa created some tension between the commands. This command relationship proved unsatisfactory, because in 1980, before the 1986 Goldwater–Nichols Act, there was significant separation within the chain of command of the separate Armed Services and no single channel of communication through which the RDF commander could communicate directly to the United States Secretary of Defense on matters specifically relating to the RDF.

==== Army elements ====
Designated Army elements of the force were:

- HQ Commander, XVIII Airborne Corps, Fort Bragg, North Carolina. The Commander of the XVIII Airborne Corps was designated as the commander of Army Forces within the Rapid Deployment Joint Task Force and rotated with the other service or assigned as the overall commander depending on mission. All of the following units were permanently assigned under the XVIII Abn Corps, except the 9th Infantry Division, which was assigned under III Corps and was to be attached to XVIII Abn Corps when used as part of the Rapid Deployment Joint Task Force.
- 9th Infantry Division, "Old Reliables", Fort Lewis, Washington

Conceived as a "High Technology Light Division" and/or as a "Motorized Division", which provided the same firepower as a mechanized (heavy) infantry division but with far fewer aircraft sorties needed for deployment. The division emphasized "heavy firepower, long range mobility, interdiction capabilities to the enemy's rear elements ('extended battlefield concept') with light forces and long range weapons, and improved C3 (command, control and communications) and real-time information analysis for effective targeting and weapons utilisation". The division was organized into three brigades of ground troops with a mix of heavy and light battalions, as well as combat support for a total of 14,500 personnel. The fourth brigade was an air attack cavalry brigade with two battalions of attack helicopters, a cavalry squadron with two ground and two air cavalry troops and a transport helicopter battalion.

- 24th Infantry Division (Mechanized), "The Victory Division", Fort Stewart, Georgia

Equipped with M60 Patton tanks in 1980. Also known as the "Heavy Division" of the XVIII Airborne Corps. It later was re-equipped with M1 Abrams tanks and M2 Bradley Fighting Vehicles. These were rapidly employed with great success in Desert Shield in 1990 and Operation Desert Storm in 1991 as the main effort of the XVIII Airborne Corps and northernmost U.S. formation used during the eastward push to destroy the Iraqi Republican Guard.

- 82d Airborne Division, "The All-Americans", Fort Bragg, North Carolina.

The 82nd is the United States' only Airborne Division. It consisted (until 2006) of nine infantry battalions within three brigades, which can become a "Task Force" (TF) if combined with all supporting assets such as one Airborne Artillery Battalion per Brigade TF or Battery per Battalion TF, an Airborne Armor Company per Brigade TF, one Airborne Air Defense Artillery (ADA) battery, Airborne Combat Engineer company, Airborne Intelligence and Signal companies per Brigade TF, plus various Airborne medical, maintenance, chemical, MP, quartermaster and aviation units, which brings the total to 16,000 paratroopers in the division. This was one of the key elements in the RDJTF as it could deploy a Battalion Task Force in eighteen hours and a Division Ready Brigade (DRB) in twenty-four hours. It is most likely that initially a brigade would have been dropped to secure an airhead and then the rest of the division would arrive shortly afterward. Although predominantly infantry, the 82nd had a substantial organic airlift in its helicopter assets, which were to be upgraded with UH-60 Black Hawk helicopters by the end of the 1980s.

- 101st Airborne Division (Air Assault), "The Screaming Eagles", Fort Campbell, Kentucky.

The 101st was unique among the Army's divisions due to its massed assault helicopter capability. It was organized into three brigades of three battalions each, the usual support elements and three helicopter battalions, two transport, one attack for a total of 17,900 personnel, which also makes the 101st the largest division in the US Army. Originally an airborne division, the 101st gradually converted to an airmobile role during the Vietnam War, where it integrated a large number of helicopter assets as the 1st Cavalry (Airmobile) Division had done to provide rapid tactical mobility. As its experience with helicopter operations increased and tactics refined, it changed its designation to Air Assault, but is still referenced to as an Airborne Division because of its long and rich heritage. The division was designed to envelop the enemy with speed and firepower.

- 6th Cavalry Brigade (Air Combat), Fort Hood, Texas

The only Air Cavalry brigade in the U.S. Army. The brigade was made up of two aviation squadrons with support, communications and headquarters elements. The brigade had scout (OH-58 Kiowa), attack (AH-1 Cobra) and transport (UH-1 Huey, replaced by UH-60 Black Hawk and CH-47 Chinook) helicopters and operated with the same tactics as the 101st, emphasizing speed of attack and envelopment. By 1985 the brigade consisted of 4-9 CAV (Attack), 7-17 CAV (Attack), 1st Squadron, 6th Cavalry Regiment (1-6 CAV) (Attack), and 5-17 CAV (Attack).

==== Marine Corps elements ====
Designated USMC elements of the force were:

- 1st Marine Division, Camp Pendleton, California

Consisted of 18,000 Marines, its aviation support group, the 3rd Marine Air Wing (159 aircraft), the 1st Force Service Support Group, and 7th Marine Amphibious Brigade (of 11,000 personnel). The Marines provided the RDJTF the capability of projecting sea power ashore and then conduct land operations. In an amphibious operation there were three types of units which were available to the RDJTF:

A Marine Expeditionary Unit (MEU) [pronounced M-yew] which consisted of a Marine battalion (approximately 2000 men) with a squadron-sized element of various support aircraft being forward deployed to certain areas

A Marine Expeditionary Brigade (MEB) which consisted of a regimental landing team (two MEUs), a tank company, artillery battalion, support elements and a Marine Aircraft Group

A Marine Expeditionary Force (MEF) which consisted of a Marine division (three MEBs), a tank battalion, artillery regiment, a Light Attack Vehicle battalion, an Amphibious Attack Vehicle battalion, engineer battalion, reconnaissance battalion, and a Marine Aircraft Wing (600 aircraft).

==== Navy elements ====
Designated United States Navy elements of the force were:

- Three carrier battle groups (one each in the Indian Ocean, Mediterranean Sea, and Pacific Ocean)
- A surface action group, antisubmarine warfare patrol aircraft, the amphibious ships to carry a MEU on station, and the prepositioning ships at Diego Garcia which by 1982 could provide the supplies to sustain the 7th Marine Amphibious Brigade (7th MAB) for over two weeks and supply several tactical air force squadrons.

The Navy's Military Sealift Command (MSC) would have transported heavy equipment to the area of operations, and to supply the force once deployed. The heavier items of equipment would also have to be transported by sea such as the 100,000 tons of equipment for the 24th Mechanized Division (which would take five weeks by air using every transport available). While bulky items and sheer tonnage are the advantages of sealift, its main disadvantage was speed—as it would take longer to deploy, and be more vulnerable to enemy action.

==== USAF elements ====
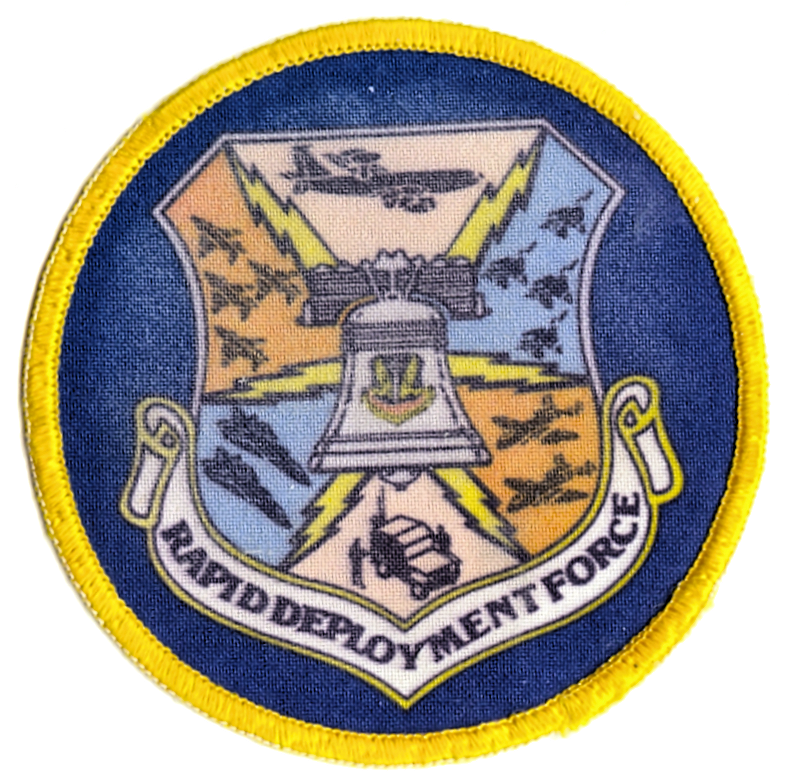
Rapid Deployment Joint Task Force, USAF emblem

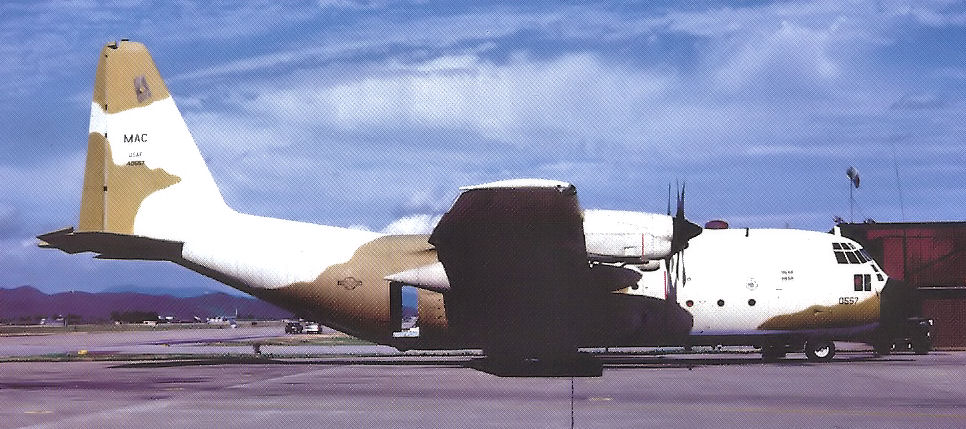
The Rapid Deployment Joint Task Force of the early 1980s led to this prototype desert livery shown on this Little Rock AFB-based C-130E, AF Ser. No. 64-0557, assigned to the 314th Tactical Airlift Wing.

Designated United States Air Force elements of the force were from Tactical Air Command (TAC):

- 1st Tactical Fighter Wing, Langley AFB, Virginia (F-15 Eagle)
- 27th Tactical Fighter Wing, Cannon AFB, New Mexico (F-111D)
- 49th Tactical Fighter Wing, Holloman AFB, New Mexico (F-15 Eagle)
- 347th Tactical Fighter Wing, Moody AFB, Georgia (F-4E Phantom II)
- 354th Tactical Fighter Wing, Myrtle Beach AFB, South Carolina (A-10 Thunderbolt II)
- 366th Tactical Fighter Wing, Mountain Home AFB, Idaho, (F-111F)
- 388th Tactical Fighter Wing, Hill AFB, Utah (F-16 Fighting Falcon)

Additional secondary units consisted of squadrons deployed from the following USAFE-committed TAC wings:

- 31st Tactical Fighter Wing, Homestead AFB, Florida (F-4E Phantom II)
- 4th Tactical Fighter Wing, Seymour Johnson AFB, North Carolina (F-4E Phantom II)
- 23d Tactical Fighter Wing, England AFB, Louisiana (A-7D Corsair II)
- 363d Tactical Reconnaissance Wing, Shaw AFB, South Carolina (RF-4C Phantom II)
- 552d Airborne Early Warning and Control Wing, Tinker AFB, Oklahoma (E-3A AWACS)
- 41st Electronic Combat Squadron, Davis-Monthan AFB, Arizona, (EC-130H Compass Call)

The Air Force also controlled the Military Airlift Command (MAC), which put the "Rapid" into the RDJTF. The RDJTF relied upon the C-5 Galaxy (70 aircraft), C-141 Starlifter (234 aircraft), and C-130 Hercules (490) of MAC to deploy the fastest reacting ground forces, the forward elements of the 82d Airborne, Special Forces and USMC personnel of the 7th MAB.

The RDJTF could also call upon the Civil Reserve Air Fleet (CRAF) of 111 long-range cargo and 231 long-range passenger aircraft.

Air Force Communications Command detailed some air traffic controllers to be ready to deploy around the world to handle the increased level of Air Traffic.

=== Formation of United States Central Command ===
On 24 April 1981, Secretary of Defense Caspar Weinberger announced that the RDJTF would evolve into a separate command with specific geographic responsibilities. The planned change was favorably received in the Congress, though not unanimously. Both the Senate Committee on Armed Services and the Senate Committee on Appropriations expressed their concern "about the absence of an organized effort to plan and provide for possible power projection requirements in other Third World areas which are also critical to U.S. interests." The decision to focus the attention of the RDJTF solely on the Middle East and Central Asia—to the exclusion of other areas, such as central and southern Africa—did little to ease this concern.

On 1 January 1983 the RDJTF became a separate Unified Combatant Command known as the United States Central Command (USCENTCOM). The USCENTCOM commander enjoys the same stature as other theater commanders, and he reports directly to the Secretary of Defense. His operational planning responsibility is limited to the Middle East and Central Asia only.

== See also ==
- Strategic Army Corps
