= Paul X. Kelley =

American general (1928–2019)

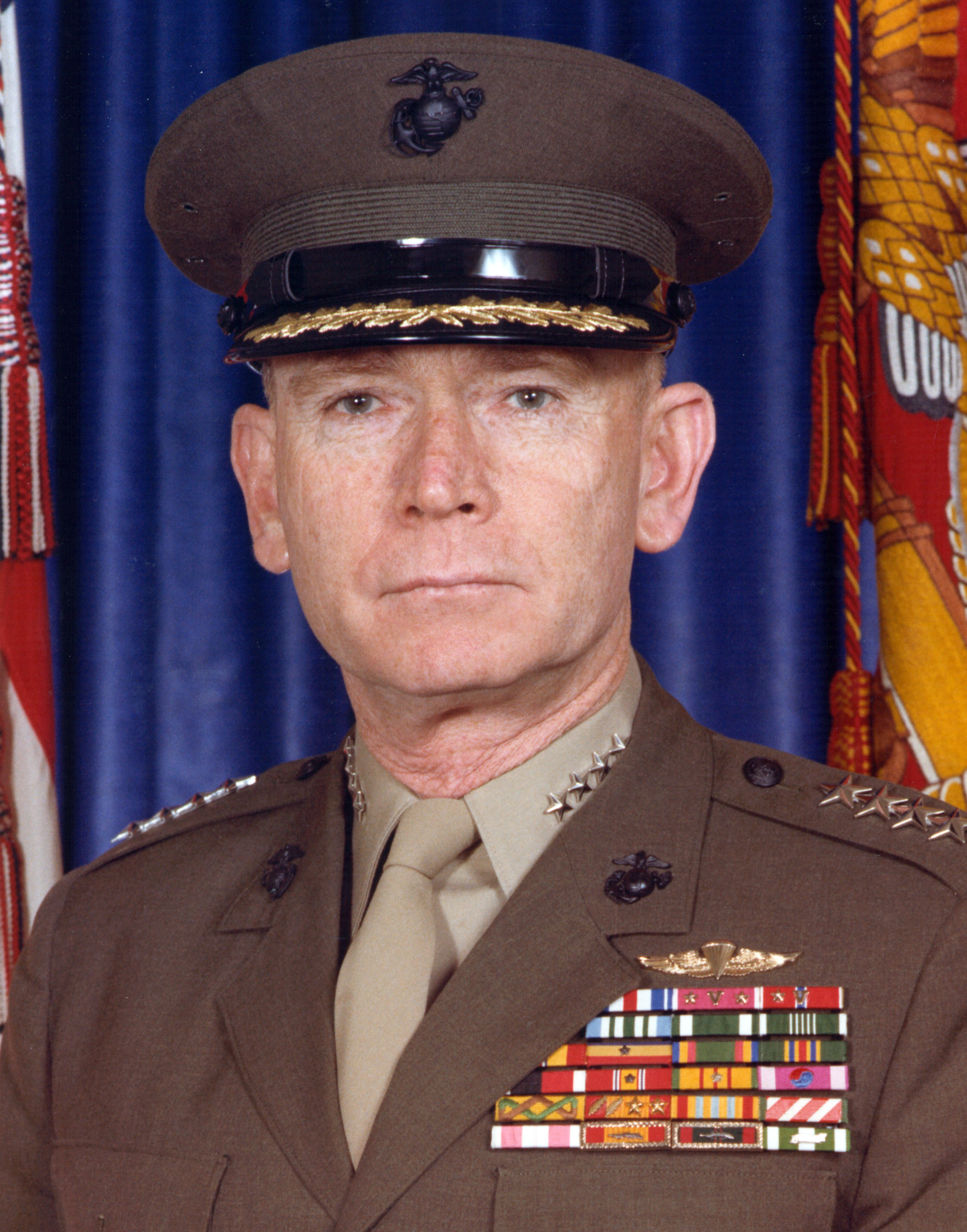
- Official portrait, 1983
- Born: Paul Xavier Kelley; November 11, 1928; Boston, Massachusetts, U.S.
- Died: December 29, 2019 (aged 91); McLean, Virginia, U.S.
- Burial place: Arlington National Cemetery
- Military career
- Allegiance: United States
- Branch: United States Marine Corps
- Service years: 1950–1987
- Rank: General
- Commands: Commandant of the Marine Corps; Assistant Commandant of the Marine Corps; Rapid Deployment Joint Task Force; 4th Marine Division; 1st Marine Regiment; 2nd Battalion, 4th Marines
- Conflicts: Vietnam War: Operation Texas
- Awards: Defense Distinguished Service Medal; Navy Distinguished Service Medal; Army Distinguished Service Medal; Air Force Distinguished Service Medal; Silver Star; Legion of Merit (3) w/ Combat "V"; Bronze Star Medal (2) w/ Combat "V"
- Other work: Cassidy & Associates; Chairman, American Battle Monuments Commission

Paul Xavier Kelley (November 11, 1928 – December 29, 2019) was a United States Marine Corps four-star general who served as the 28th Commandant of the United States Marine Corps from July 1, 1983, to June 30, 1987.

Kelley served 37 years active duty in the Marine Corps. Commissioned through Villanova College's Naval Reserve Officer Training Corps program in 1950, his first posting was with Aircraft Engineering Squadron 12 (AES-12) at Marine Corps Air Station Quantico, Virginia. He then served an exchange tour with the Royal Marines, and later joined the Marine Force Reconnaissance community and served with distinction during the Vietnam War. Kelley's final assignments were as Assistant Commandant of the Marine Corps and then Commandant of the Marine Corps until his retirement in 1987. Following his retirement from the Marine Corps, Kelley served on a number of corporate boards.

== Early life ==
Kelley was born on November 11, 1928, in Boston, Massachusetts, to Albert and Josephine (née Sullivan) Kelley. He was a graduate of The English High School in Boston in 1946. He earned his Bachelor of Science degree in economics from Villanova University in 1950.

== Marine career ==
Kelley was commissioned a second lieutenant in the United States Marine Corps in June 1950 through Villanova College's Naval Reserve Officer Training Corps program. After graduating from The Basic School in March 1951, he served with the 2nd Marine Division at Camp Lejeune, North Carolina, as an infantry officer in a wide variety of billets, including his first assignment to Aircraft Engineering Squadron-12 (AES-12) out of Marine Corps Base Quantico in Virginia. In September 1952, he was assigned to the USS Salem, where he served for 20 months, first as executive officer and then as commanding officer of the Marine Detachment on the Salem. While aboard Salem, he qualified as Officer of the Deck (Underway). In December 1953, he was promoted to captain.

From July 1956 to December 1957, Kelley served as the Special Assistant to the Director of Personnel at Headquarters Marine Corps, Washington, D.C. He then completed the Airborne Pathfinder School at Fort Benning, Georgia. In February 1958, he was assigned to the newly activated 2nd Force Reconnaissance Company, Force Troops, Fleet Marine Force, Atlantic, Camp Lejeune, when he served as the executive officer and then commanding officer.

From September 1960 to May 1961, Kelley was selected as the United States Marine Corps infantry officer to serve with the British Royal Marines, becoming one of the few foreigners to earn the Royal Marines Commandos' coveted green beret. During this tour, he attended the Commando Course in England, served as assistant operations officer with 45 Commando in Aden, and as commander "C" Troop, 42 Commando in Singapore, Malaya and Borneo. On March 1, 1961, he was promoted to major. From June 1964 until August 1965, Kelley became commanding officer, Marine Barracks, Newport, Rhode Island.

In 1965, Kelley deployed to South Vietnam. He first served as the combat intelligence officer for the 3rd Marine Amphibious Force, FMF, Pacific. Following this assignment, he served as the commanding officer, 2nd Battalion, 4th Marines in combat. He was promoted to lieutenant colonel on January 20, 1966. During his tour as battalion commander, he earned the Silver Star, the Legion of Merit with Valor device and two awards of the Bronze Star Medal with Valor device. Four years later, from 1970 to 1971, Kelley commanded the 1st Marine Regiment, which was the last Marine regiment in combat in Vietnam. He earned a second Legion of Merit during this deployment.

In 1974, Kelley was promoted to the rank of brigadier general. As a general officer, he served as commanding general of the 4th Marine Division, Fleet Marine Force; director, Marine Corps Development Center; director, Marine Corps Education Center; and deputy chief of staff for requirements and programs, Headquarters, United States Marine Corps. In February 1980, Kelley was promoted to lieutenant general and named as the first commander of the Rapid Deployment Joint Task Force. On July 1, 1981, Kelley was promoted to the rank of general, the youngest marine to have achieved that rank. He then assumed duties as the assistant commandant of the Marine Corps and chief of staff, Headquarters Marine Corps. On July 1, 1983, Kelley was named Commandant of the Marine Corps, succeeding General Robert H. Barrow.

=== Silver Star citation ===
Citation:

The President of the United States of America takes pleasure in presenting the Silver Star to Lieutenant Colonel Paul Xavier Kelley (MCSN: 0-50603), United States Marine Corps, for conspicuous gallantry and intrepidity in action while serving as Commanding Officer of the Second Battalion, Fourth Marines, THIRD Marine Division (Rein.), FMF, in connection with combat operations against insurgent communist (Viet Cong) forces in the Republic of Vietnam. On 21 March 1966, during Operation TEXAS, Lieutenant Colonel Kelley led his Battalion in a helicopter assault on a Viet Cong fortified area in Quang Ngai Province. Debarking from his helicopter into accurate, intense enemy fire, he realized that the landing zone must be enlarged in order to bring in the balance of the Battalion safely. With great professional competence and composure, he maneuvered his Companies into position to attack the enemy, employing all available supporting arms. As a result of his decisive action, all aircraft and personnel landed without sustaining casualties. In the attack phase, with complete disregard for his own safety, Lieutenant Colonel Kelley placed himself in a strategic, exposed position from which he could best control the assault companies and supporting arms. His personal example and bold leadership were a source of inspiration to all who were engaged in the operation. At the conclusion of the vicious three and a half hour battle, Lieutenant Colonel Kelley's Battalion had accounted for 167 Viet Cong killed, many small arms and crew served weapons captured, and tons of supplies destroyed. By his daring leadership, relentless fighting spirit and unswerving dedication to duty throughout, Lieutenant Colonel Kelley upheld the highest traditions of the United States Naval Service.

=== Promotion record ===
Rank	Branch	Date
Second lieutenant	Marine Corps	June 1950
First lieutenant	Marine Corps	April 1952
Captain	Marine Corps	December 16, 1953
Major	Marine Corps	March 1, 1961
Lieutenant colonel	Marine Corps	January 20, 1966
Colonel	Marine Corps	April 1, 1970
Brigadier general	Marine Corps	August 6, 1974
Major general	Marine Corps	June 29, 1976
Lieutenant general	Marine Corps	February 4, 1980
General	Marine Corps	July 1, 1981

== Post-Marine Corps career ==
In 1989, Kelley joined the Washington, D.C. public policy firm Cassidy & Associates; he served as the vice chairman emeritus. From 1989 to 1994, he served as Chairman of the American Battle Monuments Commission. Kelley was on the board of directors of a number of corporations, including Allied Signal, Inc., GenCorp, Inc., Saul Centers, Inc., Sturm Ruger & Co., Inc.; and the Wackenhut Corporation. In December 2006, Kelley chaired a panel of military and business leaders looking to improve the United States's energy security. They recommended tougher emission standards and greater access to offshore United States gas and oil reserves.

On July 26, 2007, the Washington Post published an op-ed by Kelley and Robert F. Turner, in which they warned that the July 20, 2007 executive order issued by President George W. Bush, purporting to define torture and allowable interrogation methods, appeared to violate Common Article 3 of the Geneva Conventions and thus expose the president and other persons to potential liability for war crimes. On November 9, 2010, he was named an honorable Reagan Fellow from Eureka college. Kelley sat on the Honorary Board for the 501 (c) (3) Non Profit Wine Country Marines.

Kelley died of complications of Alzheimer's disease at a care facility in McLean, Virginia on December 29, 2019, at the age of 91. He was interred in Arlington National Cemetery on February 13, 2020, following a memorial service at the Fort Myer Memorial Chapel.

== Honors, awards and badges ==
=== Military ===
Kelley's decorations, awards, and badges include:

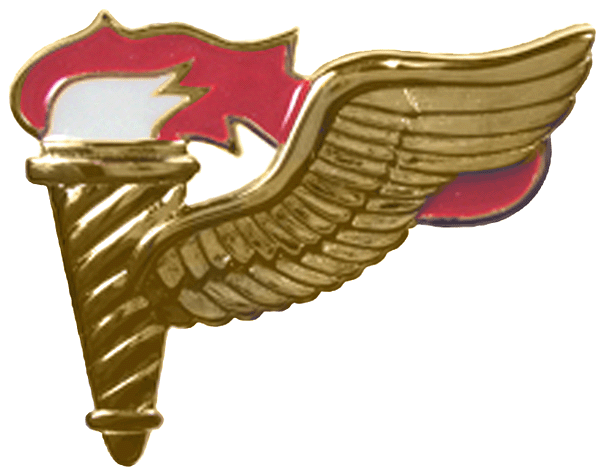

Marine Corps Parachutist badge
1st row		Defense Distinguished Service Medal	Navy Distinguished Service Medal		Office of the Joint Chiefs of Staff Identification Badge
2nd row	Army Distinguished Service Medal	Air Force Distinguished Service Medal	Silver Star Medal	Legion of Merit w/ Combat "V" and 2 gold stars	Office of the Joint Chiefs of Staff Identification Badge
3rd row	Bronze Star Medal w/ Combat "V" and 1 gold star	Joint Service Commendation Medal	Navy and Marine Corps Commendation Medal	Army Commendation Medal	Office of the Joint Chiefs of Staff Identification Badge
4th row	Combat Action Ribbon	Navy Presidential Unit Citation w/ 1 bronze star	Navy Unit Commendation	Navy Meritorious Unit Commendation	Office of the Joint Chiefs of Staff Identification Badge
5th row	Navy Occupation Service Medal	National Defense Service Medal w/ 1 bronze star	Vietnam Service Medal w/ 1 silver star	Order of National Security Merit, Tong-il Medal	Office of the Joint Chiefs of Staff Identification Badge
6th row	Vietnam Army Distinguished Service Order, 2nd Class	Vietnam Gallantry Cross w/ 2 palms and 2 gold stars	Vietnam Armed Forces Honor Medal 1st class	Vietnam Staff Service Medal 1st class	Office of the Joint Chiefs of Staff Identification Badge
7th row	Vietnam Training Service Medal 1st class	Vietnam Gallantry Cross Unit Citation w/ palm and gold frame	Vietnam Civil Actions Unit Citation w/ palm and gold frame	Vietnam Campaign Medal	Office of the Joint Chiefs of Staff Identification Badge
Army Master Parachutist Badge; Pathfinder Badge

- Note: The gold United States Navy Parachute Rigger badge was worn unofficially by Marine Corps personnel in place of United States Army parachutist badge from 1942 to 1963 before it officially became the Navy and Marine Corps Parachutist insignia on July 12, 1963, per BuPers Notice 1020. Members of the Marine Corps who attended jump school before 1963 were issued the silver Army parachutist badge but may be depicted wearing the gold Navy Parachute Rigger badge as it was common during this time period to do so.

=== Civilian ===
Kelley was awarded honorary doctoral degrees from Villanova University, Norwich University, Webster University, Jacksonville University, and the United States Sports Academy. He was a recipient of the National Geographic Society's Major General O.A. Anderson Award, the Veterans of Foreign Wars' National Armed Forces Award, the American Academy of Achievement's Golden Plate Award presented by Chairman of the Joint Chiefs of Staff and Awards Council member General John W. Vessey, Jr., USA, the Navy League's Admiral John M. Will Award, the Ireland Fund's Irishman of the Year for Southern California Award, the Reserve Officers Association's Minuteman Hall of Fame Award, and the Marine Corps Scholarship Fund's Semper Fidelis Award.

Eureka College, alma mater of President Ronald Reagan, named Kelley as its third "Honorary Reagan Fellow" to celebrate his lifetime of service and leadership on November 9, 2010, at the Reagan Building in Washington, D.C. The date was chosen to correspond with the 21st anniversary of the fall of the Berlin Wall.

== See also ==
- List of United States Marine Corps four-star generals

Military offices
Preceded by Robert H. Barrow	Commandant of the Marine Corps; 1983–1987	Succeeded by Alfred M. Gray, Jr.
Preceded by Kenneth McLennan	Assistant Commandant of the Marine Corps; 1981–1983	Succeeded by John K. Davis
