= United States Strike Command =

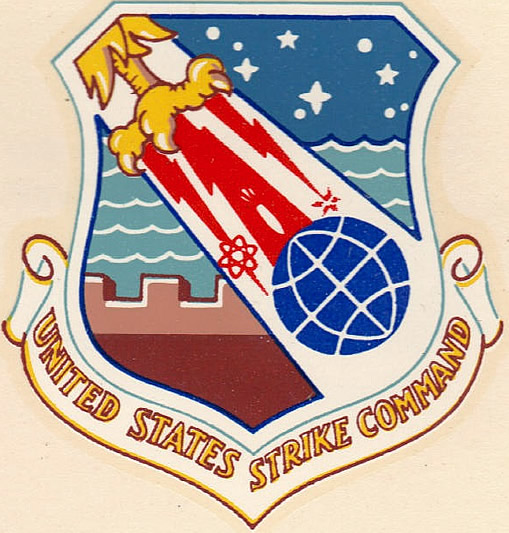
- Active: 1961–72: Strike Command; 1972–87: Readiness Command
- Country: United States
- Type: Unified Combatant Command
- Part of: United States Department of Defense
- Headquarters: MacDill Air Force Base, Tampa, Florida
- Engagements: Operation Dragon Rouge

In 1961 the United States Strike Command (STRICOM) was established at MacDill Air Force Base as a unified combatant command capable of responding to global crises. The name of the command was originally derived from the acronym for Swift Tactical Reaction In Every Known Environment (STRIKE). It integrated the CONUS-based forces of the Army's Continental Army Command (essentially elements from the Army's Strategic Army Corps (STRAC)) and the Air Force's Composite Air Strike Force (CASF) and Tactical Air Command.

== Mission and deployments ==
In March 1961 Secretary of Defense McNamara ordered the JCS to develop a plan for integrating the Strategic Army Corps (STRAC) and Tactical Air Command into a unified command. The JCS Chairman, the CSA, and the CSAF endorsed this idea, provided that the new command eventually included Navy and Marine Corps units. But the CNO objected that the inherent flexibility of naval forces would be sacrificed if assigned to a command tailored to STRAC and TAC. He suggested instead that troop carrier and ground-support aircraft be made organic to the Army or that a joint task force be organized that would train air-ground teams for augmentation of existing commands. Similarly, the CMC argued that development of a "doctrine" for joint Army-Air Force operations would suffice.

Secretary McNamara ruled in favor of the proposed new command. United States Strike Command (USSTRICOM) was activated on 1 January 1962 under an Army general. USSTRICOM assumed operational control over the combat-ready forces of TAC and CONARC. In 1965 the United States Atlantic Fleet became STRICOM's naval component command. A year later General Theodore J. Conway took command, a position he held until 1969. Initially, STRICOM's assigned missions were to: (a) provide a reserve of general purpose forces for reinforcing the other unified commands, (b) train the general reserve, (c) develop joint doctrine and, (d) plan for and execute contingency operations. Subsequently, STRICOM's missions were expanded to include planning for, and execution of, operations in the Middle East, sub-Sahara Africa, and Southern Asia (MEAFSA).

STRICOM took place in the worldwide readiness test (of which Operation Giant Lance formed a part) in 1969, sortieing U. S. Navy Middle East Force ships into the Gulf of Aden.

General Benjamin O. Davis Jr.'s book Benjamin O. Davis, Jr.,: American gives a detailed picture of the activities and preoccupations of Strike Command at the end of the 1960s. General Davis served as Deputy Commander-in-Chief and was responsible for the Middle East, Sub-Saharan Africa, and South Asia (MEAFSA).

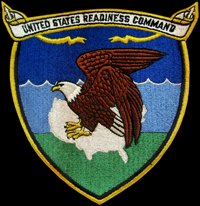
Seal of United States Readiness Command

STRICOM was redesignated United States Readiness Command (REDCOM) in 1972. Essentially, the change was nothing more than a redesignation, except that the command was divested of its MEAFSA responsibilities. The redesignated command's missions included integrating, training, and providing CONUS-based general purpose forces, as well as planning and providing joint task force headquarters and forces for operations in areas not assigned to other unified commands. In 1979, the national command authorities ordered the CINC of REDCOM (CINCRED) to establish the Rapid Deployment Joint Task Force (RDJTF) headquarters as a separate subordinate command within REDCOM. That same year, General Volney F. Warner took command of REDCOM, and held command until 1981. The Rapid Deployment Joint Task Force became an independent unified command in 1983 as United States Central Command (USCENTCOM).

Readiness Command was replaced by United States Special Operations Command (USSOCOM) in 1987, with the last CINCRED, General James J. Lindsay, becoming the first CINCSOC.

Detachment 1, 1150th USAF Special Activities Squadron, also known as "Communications Support Element" or CSE, was subordinate to USSTRICOM and operated from MacDill AFB. CSE was about a 50–50 mix of Air Force and Army personnel. CSE consisted of two units – Field Unit "A" (FUA) and Field Unit "B" (FUB) – and was mainly a mobile tactical communications outfit.

== Commanders-in-Chief ==
=== Commander-in-Chief, U.S. Strike Command ===
Date	Incumbent
1961–1966	GEN Paul D. Adams, USA
1966–1969	GEN Theodore J. Conway, USA
1969–1972	GEN John L. Throckmorton, USA

=== Commander-in-Chief, U.S. Readiness Command ===
Date	Incumbent
1972–1973	GEN John L. Throckmorton, USA
1973–1974	GEN Bruce Palmer Jr., USA
1974–1979	GEN John J. Hennessey, USA
1979–1981	GEN Volney F. Warner, USA
1981–1983	GEN Donn A. Starry, USA
1983–1985	GEN Wallace H. Nutting, USA
1985–1986	GEN Fred K. Mahaffey, USA
1986–1987	GEN James J. Lindsay, USA
