= Military Outstanding Volunteer Service Medal =

Award of the United States military

- Obverse
- Type: Military medal Service medal
- Awarded for: Substantial volunteer service to the local community
- Presented by: the U.S. Department of Defense
- Eligibility: All personnel
- Reverse
- Status: Currently awarded
- Established: Executive Order 12830, January 9, 1993
- First award: December 1993
- Service ribbon

Precedence
- Next (higher): Humanitarian Service Medal
- Next (lower): Army: Recruiting Service Ribbon; Navy/Marine Corps: Sea Service Deployment Ribbon; Air Force: Remote Combat Effects Campaign Medal; Coast Guard: Special Operations Service Ribbon

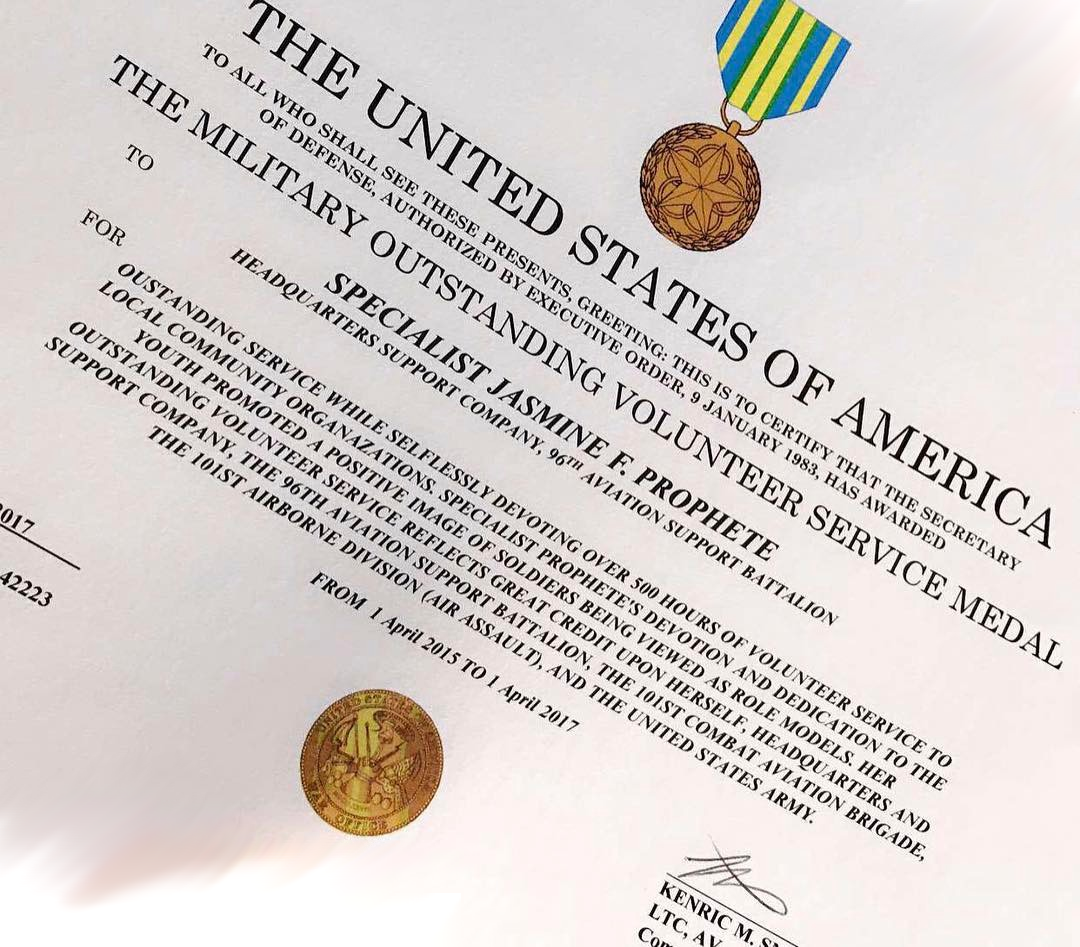
An example of an unofficial MOVSM citation from June, 2017.

The Military Outstanding Volunteer Service Medal (MOVSM) is a military award which was created under Executive Order 12830 by George H. W. Bush on January 9, 1993. The medal was designed by the Institute of Heraldry and was first issued in December 1993.

== General information ==
The MOVSM recognizes those members of the military (active duty, reserve and National Guard) who perform substantial volunteer service to the local community above and beyond the duties required as a member of the United States Armed Forces. Such volunteer service must be made in a sustained and direct nature towards the civilian community, must be significant in nature to produce tangible results, and must reflect favorably on the military service and the United States Department of Defense. The definition of volunteer service is left intentionally vague, allowing for a wide variety of activities and volunteer duties which would qualify a service member for the Military Outstanding Volunteer Service Medal. Typical volunteer work includes Volunteer Emergency Services (like the Civil Air Patrol, Coast Guard Auxiliary, or volunteer firefighting / EMS / Rescue Squad). Other volunteer opportunities that would qualify include American Red Cross, Scouting America, Habitat for Humanity, soup kitchen work, or local, state, or federal parks and forests.

'SECDEF authorized the Military Departments to establish standards for the time period required to qualify for the MOVSM. All the Military Departments have established that a sustained period of volunteer service is normally 36 months. While this does not absolutely preclude the award for exceptional volunteer service of less time, it should guide commanders in upholding the intent of the award. The overall level of volunteer participation and impact of an individual’s community service is the key to determining whether award of the MOVSM is justified.'

The MOVSM is intended to recognize exceptional community support over time and not a single act or achievement. Further, it is intended to honor direct support of community activities. For the purpose of this award, attending membership meetings or social events of a community service group is not considered qualifying service, while manning a community crisis action telephone line is considered qualifying service.

Approval authority for award of the MOVSM is held by commanders serving in the rank of lieutenant colonel (or commander) or above. Before the recommendation is forwarded to the award approval authority, the recommender must certify that the service member meets the eligibility criteria for award of the MOVSM. Substantiating documentation, such as record of hours contributed, letters or certificates from activity supervisors, or other proof of the service member's volunteer services may be attached as enclosures to the recommendation.

The MOVSM cannot be awarded more than once during a given duty assignment or tour of duty. It may be awarded posthumously, but is not authorized for presentation to foreign personnel.

The authority governing this award is DoD Manual 1348.33-V2 December 21, 2016.

== Appearance ==
The MOVSM is a bronze medal, 1 1/8 inches in diameter. The obverse bears five interlaced annulets behind a five-pointed star, surrounded by a laurel wreath. On the reverse is an oak sprig with three leaves and two acorns between the inscription OUTSTANDING VOLUNTEER SERVICE above and UNITED STATES ARMED FORCES below.

The suspension and service ribbon is 1 3/8 inches wide and consists of the following stripes: 1/8 inch bluebird; 1/8 inch goldenlight; 3/16 inch bluebird; 1/16 inch green; 5/32 inch goldenlight; center 1/16 inch green; 5/32 inch goldenlight; 1/16 inch green; 3/16 inch bluebird; 1/8 inch goldenlight; and 1/8 inch bluebird.

Multiple awards are indicated using five-pointed bronze service stars (one additional award each), and five-pointed silver service stars (five awards each).

== Multiple awards ==
First award: service ribbon with no service stars.
Second award: service ribbon with one service star.
Third award: service ribbon with two service stars.
Fourth award: service ribbon with three service stars.
Fifth award: service ribbon with four service stars.
Sixth award: service ribbon with silver service star.
Seventh award: service ribbon with silver and bronze service stars.
Eighth award: service ribbon with silver and two bronze service stars.
Ninth award: service ribbon with silver and three bronze service stars.

== Notable recipients ==
- Greg Ballard
- Kenneth Braithwaite
- Paul W. Brier
- William B. Caldwell IV
- Hung Cao
- Daryl Caudle
- Brian W. Cavanaugh
- Ronald P. Clark
- Charles B. Cooper II
- Dondi E. Costin
- Samuel D. Cox
- Jay A. DeLoach
- James H. Dickinson
- R. Scott Dingle
- Brian S. Eifler
- Ivan Edwards
- Robert H. Foglesong
- Luis Fonseca (United States Navy)
- William M. Fraser III
- R.J. Garcia (two awards)
- Walter E. Gaskin
- Ronald L. Green
- David Goggins
- Harry B. Harris Jr.
- Henry J. Hendrix
- Mark Hertling
- P. Gardner Howe III
- Lisa Jaster
- Tracy W. King
- Nancy S. Lacore
- Eric D. Little
- Paula Lodi
- Richard S. Lofgren
- Stephen J. Maranian
- Stuart B. Munsch
- John Mustin
- Richard Ojeda
- Samuel Paparo, Jr.
- Gary Peters
- Shane R. Reeves
- A. C. Roper
- Michael S. Rogers
- Roberta L. Shea
- Roger A. Towberman
- Tony L. Whitehead
- George F. Williams (3x awards)
- David Wilson (two awards)
- David R. Wolfe
- Kaleth O. Wright
