= Dirk J. Debbink =

United States admiral

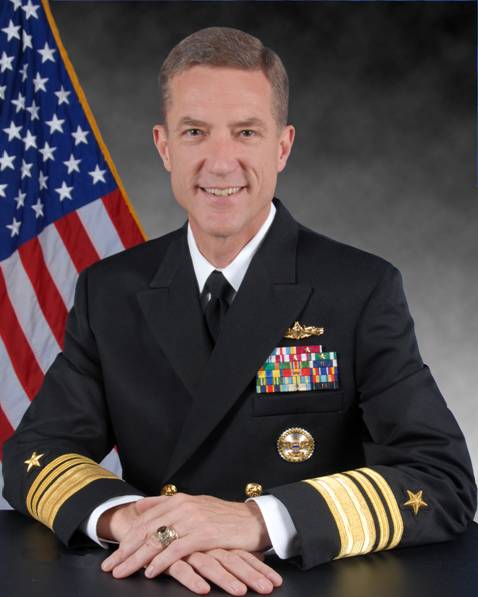
- Military career
- Allegiance: United States
- Branch: United States Navy
- Service years: 1977–2012
- Rank: Vice Admiral
- Commands: United States Navy Reserve
- Awards: Defense Superior Service Medal; Legion of Merit (2)

Dirk J. Debbink is a retired vice admiral in the United States Navy and former Chief of the Navy Reserve.

== Early life and education ==
From Oconomowoc, Wisconsin, Debbink holds a bachelor's degree from the United States Naval Academy and a Master of Business Administration from the University of Chicago Booth School of Business. He is also a registered professional engineer in Wisconsin.

== Naval career ==
Debbink graduated from the United States Naval Academy in 1977 and was assigned to the USS Fanning (FF-1076). Later assignments include serving aboard the USS Dale (DLG-19) and as Reserve Deputy Commander and Chief of Staff of the United States Pacific Fleet. He was named Deputy Chief of the Navy Reserve in 2007 before being named Chief of Navy Reserve the next year.

Awards Debbink has received include the Defense Superior Service Medal, Legion of Merit with award star, the Defense Meritorious Service Medal, the Meritorious Service Medal with award star, the Navy and Marine Corps Commendation Medal with award star, and the Navy Achievement Medal.

Military offices
Preceded by John G. Cotton	Chief of the United States Navy Reserve; 2008–2012	Succeeded by Robin Braun
