= Michael Steffen =

U.S. Navy admiral

Michael J. Steffen
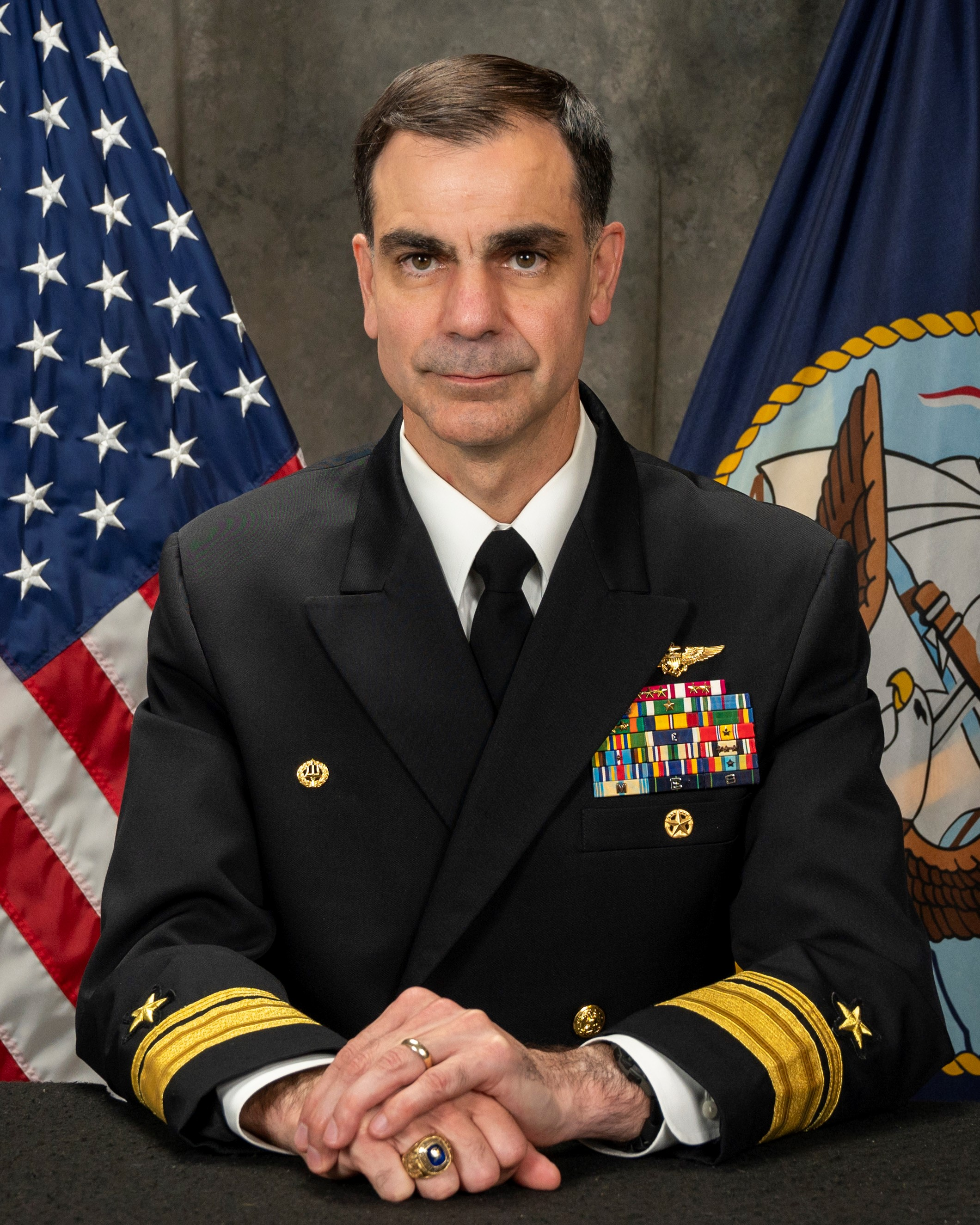
- Alma mater: Virginia Tech; University of San Diego (MS)
- Military career
- Allegiance: United States
- Branch: United States Navy
- Service years: 1992–2025
- Rank: Rear Admiral
- Commands: Navy Reserve Forces Command; Naval District Washington; Naval Air Station Joint Reserve Base Fort Worth; Maritime Support Wing; HSL-60
- Awards: Legion of Merit (3)

Michael J. Steffen is a retired United States Navy rear admiral and naval aviator who last served as the commander of Navy Reserve Forces Command from 2022 to 2025. He served as the 92nd commandant of Naval District Washington and deputy commander of the Joint Force Headquarters National Capital Region from 2021 to 2022.

Before that, he served as deputy commander of the United States Second Fleet, with tours as commander of Naval Air Station Joint Reserve Base Fort Worth from 2015 to 2017 and commander of the inactive Helicopter Anti-Submarine Squadron Light 60 (HSL-60) "Jaguars" (now HSM-60). A native of Bedford, Virginia, Steffen graduated from Virginia Tech in 1992. He received an M.S. degree in global business leadership from the University of San Diego.

In March 2022, he was nominated for promotion to rear admiral.

Military offices
Preceded by Gil Miller	Commander of Naval Air Station Joint Reserve Base Fort Worth; 2015–2017	Succeeded by Jonathan R. Townsend
Preceded by John B. Mustin	Deputy Commander of the United States Second Fleet; 2019–2021	Succeeded by Brian L. Davies
Preceded by Carl A. Lahti	Commandant of Naval District Washington and Deputy Commander of the Joint Force Headquarters National Capital Region; 2021–2022	Succeeded by Nancy S. Lacore
Preceded by John A. Schommer	Commander of Navy Reserve Forces Command; 2022–2025	Succeeded by Luke A. Frost
