= Charbonnet =

Charbonnet is a surname. Notable people with the surname include:

- Alice Charbonnet-Kellermann (1858–1914), née Charbonnet, French-Australian composer
- Desiree Charbonnet (born 1968), American judge and politician
- Patricia Charbonnet, former manager of Ice Cube - see Cube Vision
- Pierre N. Charbonnet Jr. (1922–2005), US Navy vice admiral
- Zach Charbonnet (born 2001), American football player

== See also ==
- Charbonnat, a French commune
