= Nancy Lacore =

U.S. Navy vice admiral and politician

- Lacore in 2026

Member-elect of the U.S. House of Representatives from South Carolina's 1st district
- Assuming office January 3, 2027
- Succeeding: Nancy Mace

Personal details
- Born: 1968 or 1969 (age 57–58) Albany, New York, U.S.
- Party: Democratic (2016–present)
- Other political affiliations: Republican (before 2016)
- Spouse: Patrick Lacore
- Children: 6
- Education: College of the Holy Cross (BA); San Diego State University (MA)
- Website: Campaign website; Navy website

Military service
- Allegiance: United States
- Branch/service: United States Navy; Navy Reserve
- Years of service: 1990–2000 (US Navy); 2000–2025 (US Navy Reserve)
- Rank: Vice Admiral
- Commands: Chief of Navy Reserve; Naval District Washington
- Awards: Legion of Merit; Defense Meritorious Service Medal; Meritorious Service Medal; Navy Commendation Medal; Navy Achievement Medal

Nancy Stewart Lacore (born 1968/1969) is an American politician and retired United States Navy officer who is the U.S. representative-elect for South Carolina's 1st congressional district. A vice admiral, she previously served as the 16th chief of Navy Reserve from 2024 to 2025 and the 93rd commandant of Naval District Washington from 2022 to 2024. She also served as the director of the Maritime Partnership Program, U.S. Naval Forces Europe/Africa/U.S. 6th Fleet, with additional duties as vice commander of U.S. 6th Fleet in Naples, Italy. She was relieved of her duties on 22 August 2025 by Secretary of Defense Pete Hegseth.

In 2026, Lacore ran for Congress in South Carolina's 1st congressional district as a Democrat. In the general election, she defeated Republican Jenny Costa Honeycutt to succeed outgoing incumbent Nancy Mace.

== Career ==
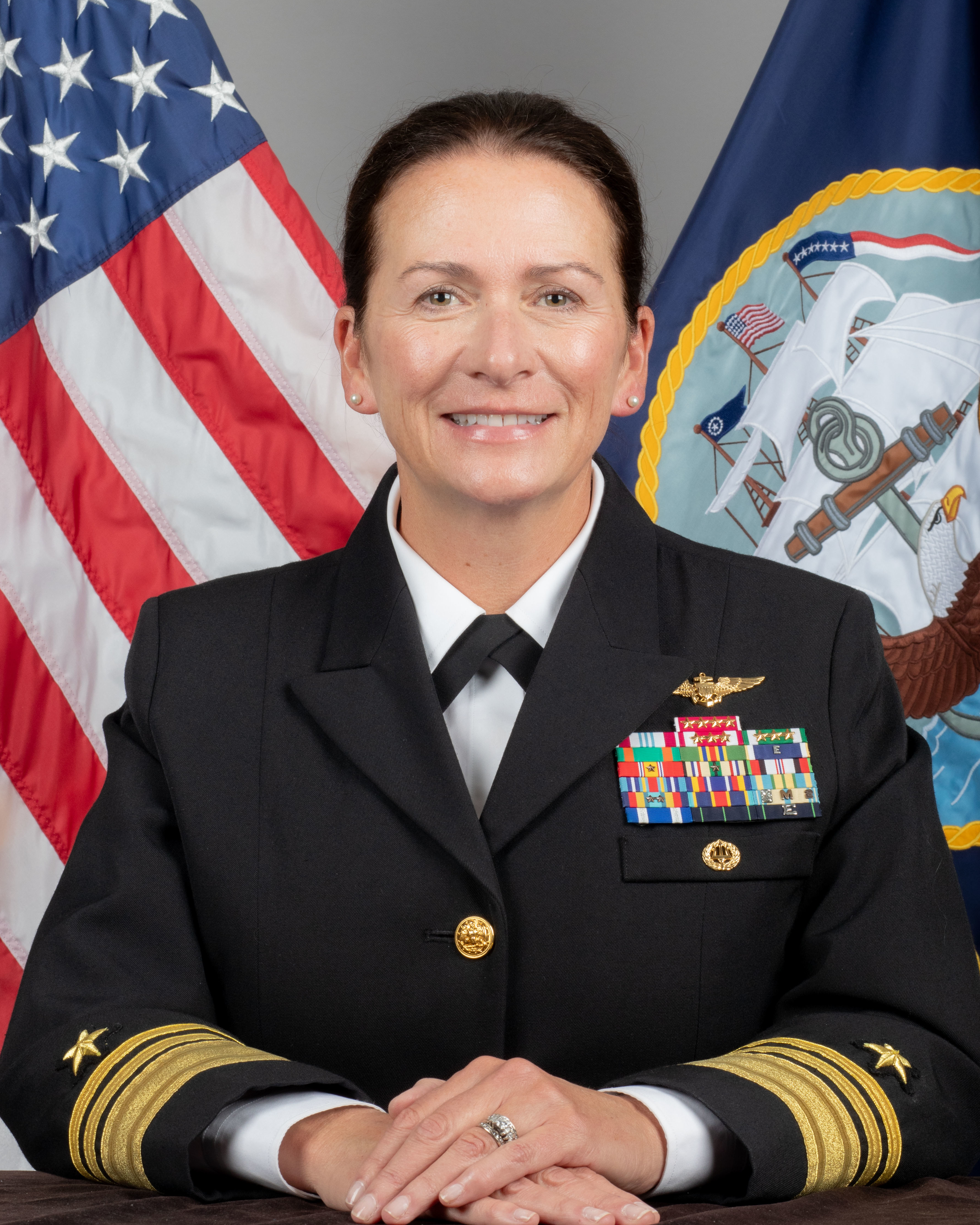
Official portrait, 2024

Lacore graduated in 1990 from the College of the Holy Cross with a Bachelor of Arts degree and received her commission from the Naval Reserve Officers Training Corps program. She earned a Master of Arts from San Diego State University and is a graduate of the Air Command and Staff College, and the National Defense University at the Joint Forces Staff College. She was designated a Naval Aviator in 1993.

Her flying tours include Helicopter Combat Support Squadrons 8 in Norfolk, Virginia and 3 in San Diego, California, as well as Commander, Helicopter Tactical Wing Pacific. She affiliated with the Navy Reserve in 2000.

Lacore's staff assignments include Navy Reserve (NR) Naval Air Wings Pacific in San Diego, California, and NR Commander Amphibious Squadron 4 Detachment 104 in Bessemer, Alabama. She served as the executive officer of NR Tactical Air Control Squadron 2186 and NR Commander Strike Force Training Atlantic, and as the chief staff officer for NR Commander 2nd Fleet Joint Force Air Component Commander, in Norfolk, Virginia. She mobilized to serve as the chief of Key Leader Engagement at Headquarters, International Security Assistance Force in Kabul, Afghanistan, from 2011 to 2012.

Her command tours include NR Commander Destroyer Squadron 40 Headquarters in Jacksonville, Florida; NR Commander, U.S. Naval Forces Europe-Africa/U.S. 6th Fleet Maritime Partnership Program Detachment 413 in Detroit, Michigan; and NR U.S. Fleet Forces Command Maritime and Air Operations Headquarters in Norfolk, Virginia. She served in a post-command assignment as the Navy Reserve chief staff officer at U.S. Fleet Forces in 2017, from which she mobilized to serve as the commanding officer, Camp Lemonnier, Djibouti.

Lacore was promoted to rear admiral (lower half) in 2018. She was promoted to rear admiral on 1 October 2021. In March 2022, Lacore was reassigned as commandant of Naval District Washington, succeeding Michael Steffen. She assumed command on 10 June 2022.

In May 2024, Lacore was nominated for promotion to vice admiral and assignment as chief of Navy Reserve. After she was relieved of her duties on 22 August 2025 by Secretary of Defense Pete Hegseth, Lacore retired as a rear admiral.

== Activities ==
After returning from Afghanistan in 2012, she started volunteering for Wounded Wear, a Chesapeake-based nonprofit that helps families of service members who were killed or seriously injured. She later joined the organization's board.

In 2014, she established "Valor Knows No Gender: Run to Remember", a 160-mile run, in 160 hours, for the 160 female veterans who died while serving in Iraq and Afghanistan. In 2018, she joined the Women's Panel Event in Djibouti, dedicated to Women's History Month and International Women's Day.

== 2026 U.S. House of Representatives campaign ==
In January 2026, Lacore announced her candidacy for the Democratic nomination in South Carolina's 1st congressional district for the 2026 United States House of Representatives elections in South Carolina, a seat occupied by Republican Nancy Mace. Endorsed by the Blue Dog PAC, Lacore achieved the highest number of votes, 36.5%, in the 9 June primary election, and defeated Mac Deford with 52.1% to 47.9% in the 23 June runoff.

In the general election, Lacore defeated Republican Jenny Costa Honeycutt with 49.65% of the vote against Honeycutt's 48.64%.

== Awards ==
Lacore's personal awards include the Legion of Merit, Defense Meritorious Service Medal, Meritorious Service Medal, Navy Commendation Medal, Navy Achievement Medal, and other campaign and unit commendations. She accumulated approximately 1300 flight hours in military aircraft.

== Personal life ==
Lacore is married to Patrick Lacore, a fellow retired Naval aviator. They have six children – five daughters and a son. Their son Patrick, a U.S. Naval Academy graduate, serves as a Marine Corps infantry officer.

Military offices
Preceded by Michael J. Steffen	Commandant of Naval District Washington; Deputy Commander of the Joint Force Headquarters National Capital Region; 2022–2024	Succeeded by David Faehnle
Preceded by John Mustin	Chief of Navy Reserve; 2024–2025	Succeeded by Richard S. Lofgren; Acting
U.S. House of Representatives
Preceded by Nancy Mace	Member of the U.S. House of Representatives from South Carolina's 1st congressional district Taking office 2027	Elect
