= John Mustin =

U.S. Navy admiral

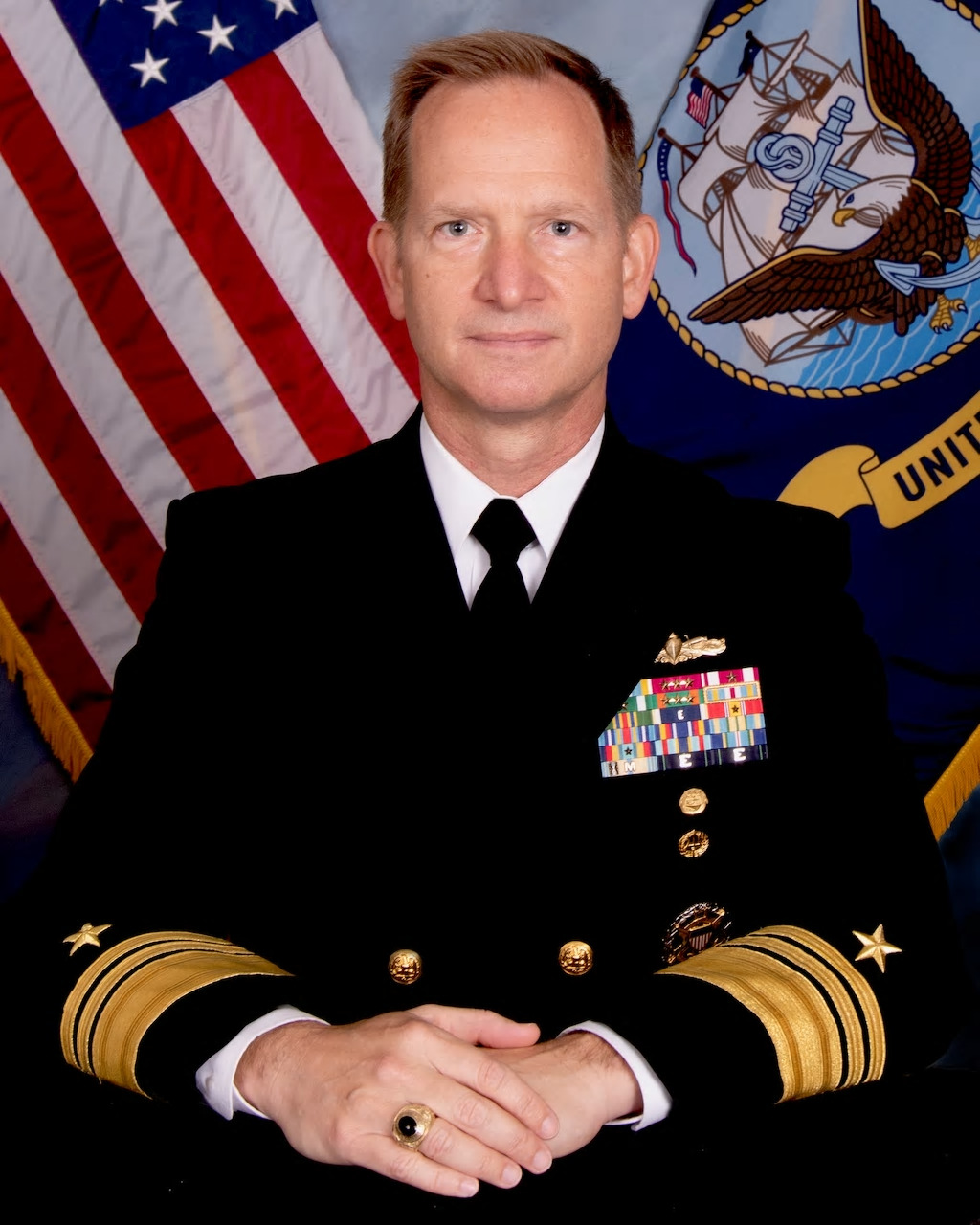
- Born: January 24, 1967 (age 59); San Diego County, California, U.S.
- Alma mater: United States Naval Academy (BS); Naval Postgraduate School (MS); Babson College (MBA)
- Military career
- Allegiance: United States
- Branch: United States Navy
- Service years: 1990–2024
- Rank: Vice Admiral
- Commands: United States Navy Reserve; Expeditionary Strike Group 2
- Awards: Defense Superior Service Medal; Legion of Merit (4)

John Burton Mustin (born January 24, 1967) is a retired United States Navy vice admiral who served as the 15th Chief of Navy Reserve from August 7, 2020, to August 23, 2024. He previously served as the Vice Commander of the United States Fleet Forces Command.

Born into a family with a long history of naval service, Mustin graduated from the United States Naval Academy in 1990 with a B.S. degree in weapons and systems engineering. He was born in San Diego County, California and raised in Alexandria, Virginia, graduating from St. Stephen's School in 1985. Mustin later earned an M.S. degree in operations research from the Naval Postgraduate School and an M.B.A. degree from Babson College.

== Awards and decorations ==
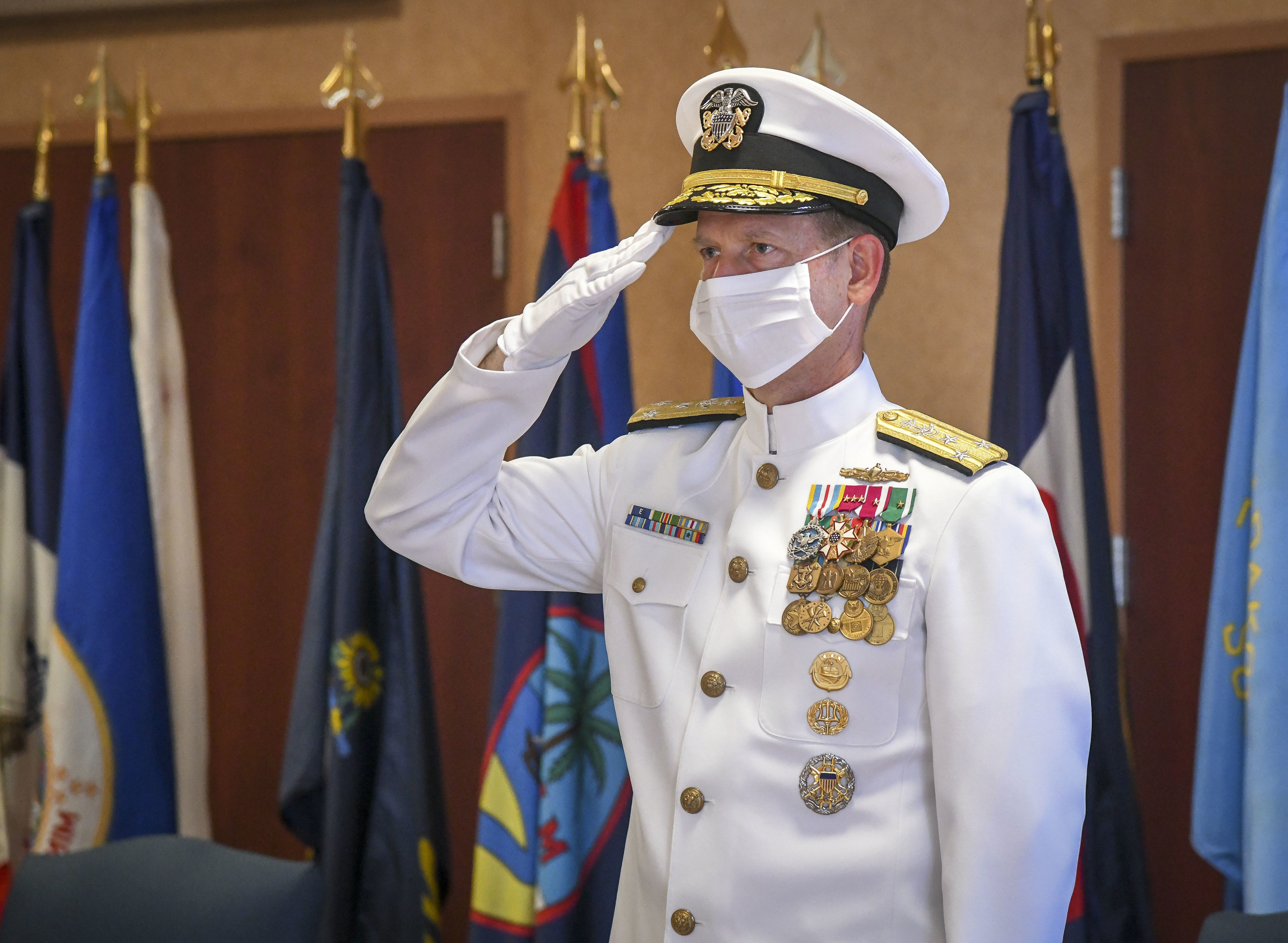
Vice Admiral Mustin salutes during the U.S. Navy Reserve change of command ceremony on August 7, 2020.

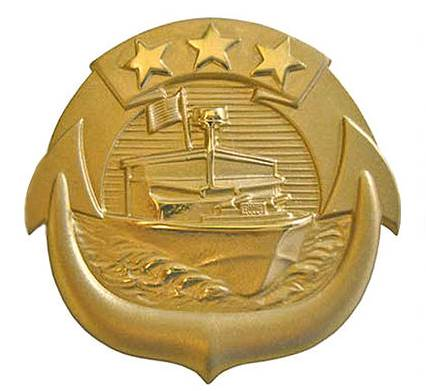

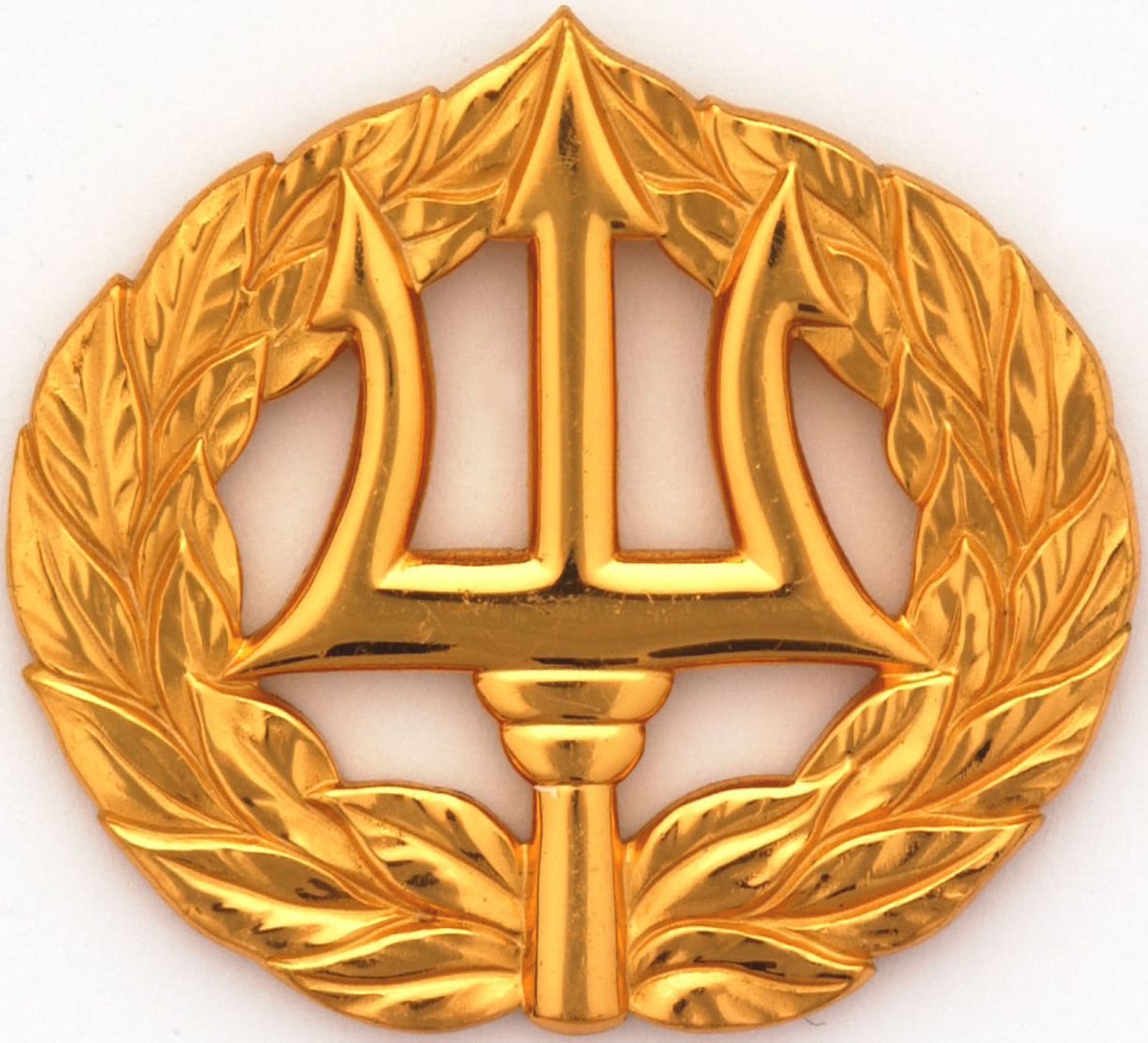

Surface Warfare Officer Pin
Defense Superior Service Medal	Legion of Merit with three award stars	Meritorious Service Medal with award star
Navy and Marine Corps Commendation Medal with award star	Navy and Marine Corps Achievement Medal with three award stars	Joint Meritorious Unit Award
Navy Meritorious Unit Commendation	Navy "E" Ribbon, 1st award	National Defense Service Medal with bronze service star
Global War on Terrorism Expeditionary Medal	Global War on Terrorism Service Medal	Military Outstanding Volunteer Service Medal
Navy Sea Service Deployment Ribbon with three bronze service stars	Navy Reserve Sea Service Deployment Ribbon	Special Operations Service Ribbon
Armed Forces Reserve Medal with silver hourglass device and "M" device	Navy Expert Rifleman Medal	Navy Expert Pistol Shot Medal
Small Craft Officer in Charge insignia
Command Ashore insignia
Office of the Joint Chiefs of Staff Identification Badge

Military offices
New office	Deputy Commander of United States Second Fleet; 2018–2019	Succeeded by Michael J. Steffen
Preceded by ???	Vice Commander of the United States Fleet Forces Command; 2019–2020	Succeeded by David Kriete
Preceded by ???	Commander of Expeditionary Strike Group 2; 2020	Succeeded by Robert D. Katz
Preceded by Luke M. McCollum	Chief of Navy Reserve; 2020–2024	Succeeded by Nancy S. Lacore
