= G. Dennis Vaughan =

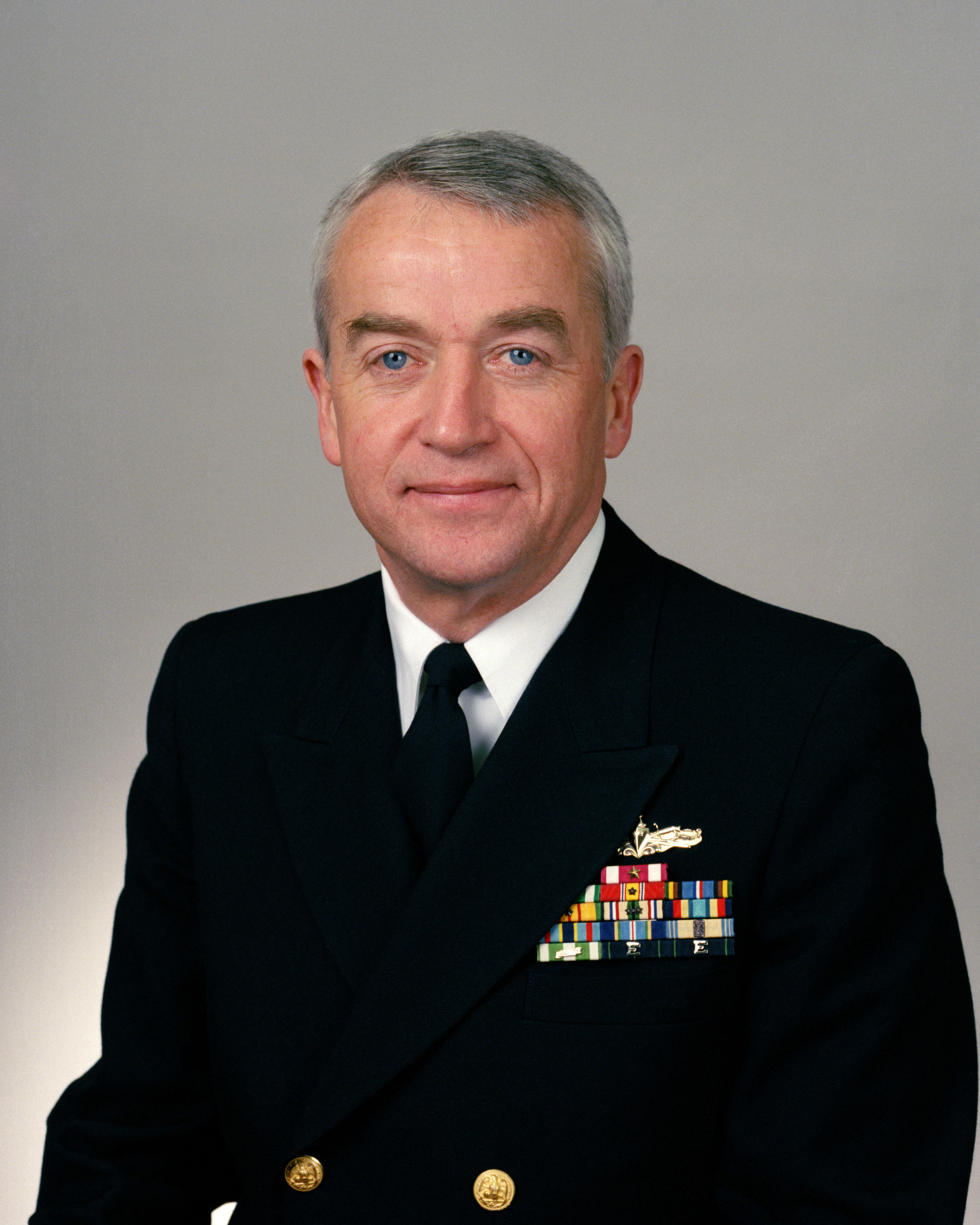
- Vaughan in January 1992
- Born: 27 March 1939 (age 87)
- Military career
- Allegiance: United States
- Branch: United States Navy
- Service years: 1963–1999
- Rank: Rear Admiral
- Commands: United States Naval Reserve; USS McKean (DD-784); USS Warbler (MSC-206)
- Awards: Navy Distinguished Service Medal; Legion of Merit (2)

George Dennis Marc "Denny" Vaughan (born 27 March 1939) is a retired rear admiral in the United States Navy. He was Chief of the United States Naval Reserve from September 1992 until October 1998. Raised in Coos Bay, Oregon, Vaughan graduated from the United States Naval Academy with a B.S. degree in marine science in 1963.
