= Robin Braun =

American naval officer

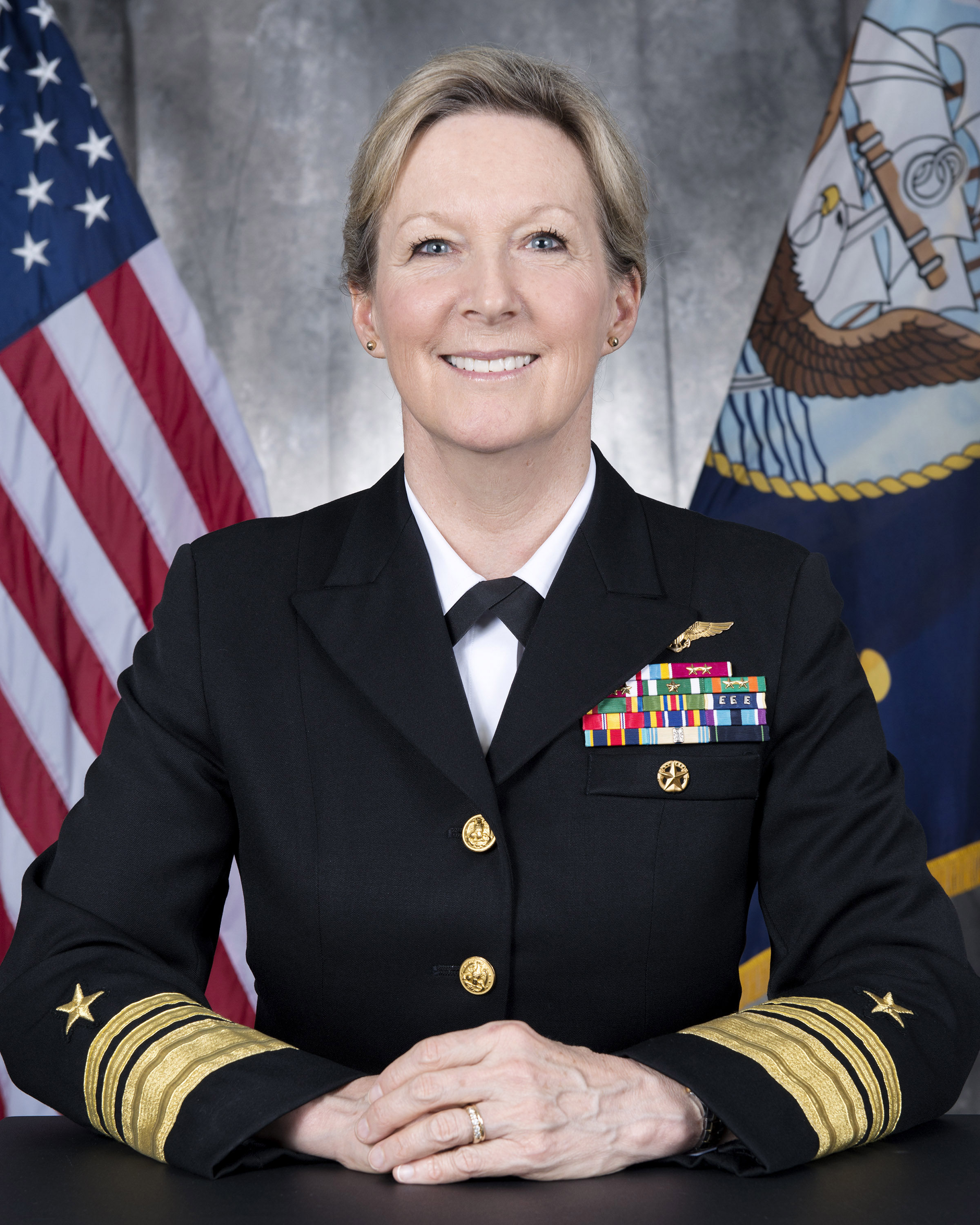
- Official portrait of Vice Admiral Robin R. Braun
- Born: Robin Rumble Braun; 1955 (age 70–71); Pensacola, Florida
- Military career
- Allegiance: United States
- Branch: United States Navy
- Service years: 1980–2016
- Rank: Vice Admiral
- Commands: United States Navy Reserve; VR-48
- Awards: Defense Superior Service Medal; Legion of Merit (3)

Robin Rumble Braun (born 1955) is a retired vice admiral of the United States Navy. Her last assignment was as Chief of Navy Reserve and Commander, Navy Reserve Force. She assumed that assignment on 13 August 2012. She was the first female commander of the United States Navy Reserve, and the first woman to lead any Reserve component of the United States military. Prior to her last assignment, Braun served as Deputy Director, European Plans and Operations Center, ECJ-3 United States European Command.

== Early life and education ==
The daughter of a career naval aviator, Braun was born in Pensacola, Florida, in 1955. She is a graduate of Northern Arizona University. She was commissioned in 1980 and was designated a naval aviator in 1981.

== Naval career ==
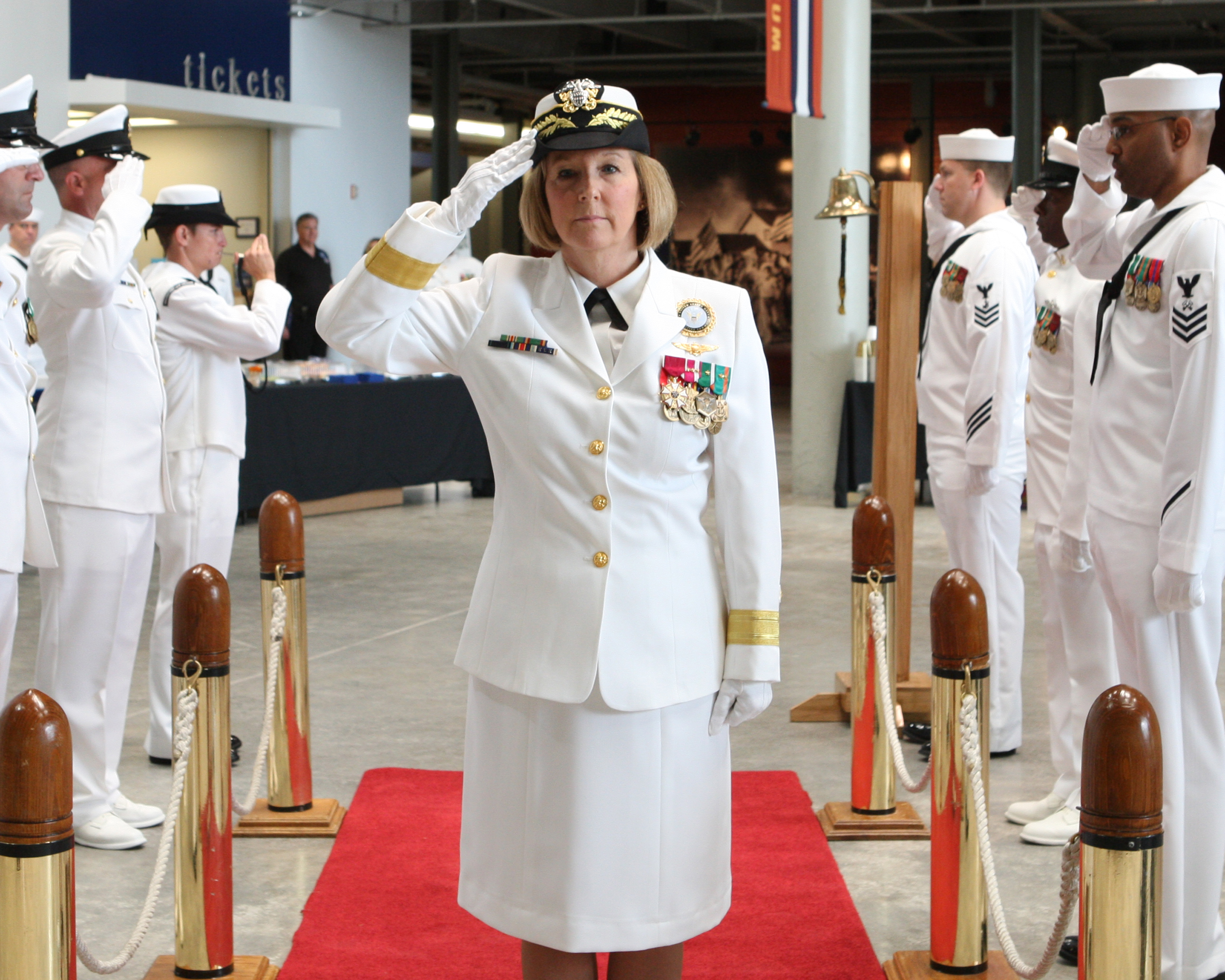
Braun salutes the sideboys during the Navy Recruiting District New Orleans change of command ceremony.

Braun's first assignment was to Training Squadron (VT) 31, Naval Air Station Corpus Christi, Texas, where she served as an instructor pilot in the T-44 aircraft. She was then assigned to Fleet Air Reconnaissance Squadron (VQ) 3, NAS Barbers Point, Hawaii, serving as a mission commander, aircraft commander, and instructor pilot in the EC-130Q aircraft and providing airborne communications to strategic forces. Subsequent squadron tours include Fleet Logistics Support Squadron (VR) 61, NAS Whidbey Island, Washington, and VR-51, NAS Glenview, Illinois.

Braun was selected for aviation command and served as commanding officer of VR-48, NAF Washington, D.C. During her tour, the squadron was awarded the Battle Efficiency Award and Chief of Naval Operations (CNO) Safety Award. Her subsequent command tours included Navy Air Logistics Office (NALO), Navy Reserve Carrier Strike Group 10 supporting the USS Harry S. Truman (CVN-75) and Joint Task Force Katrina, and Tactical Support Center 0793 supporting Patrol and Reconnaissance Wing Five.

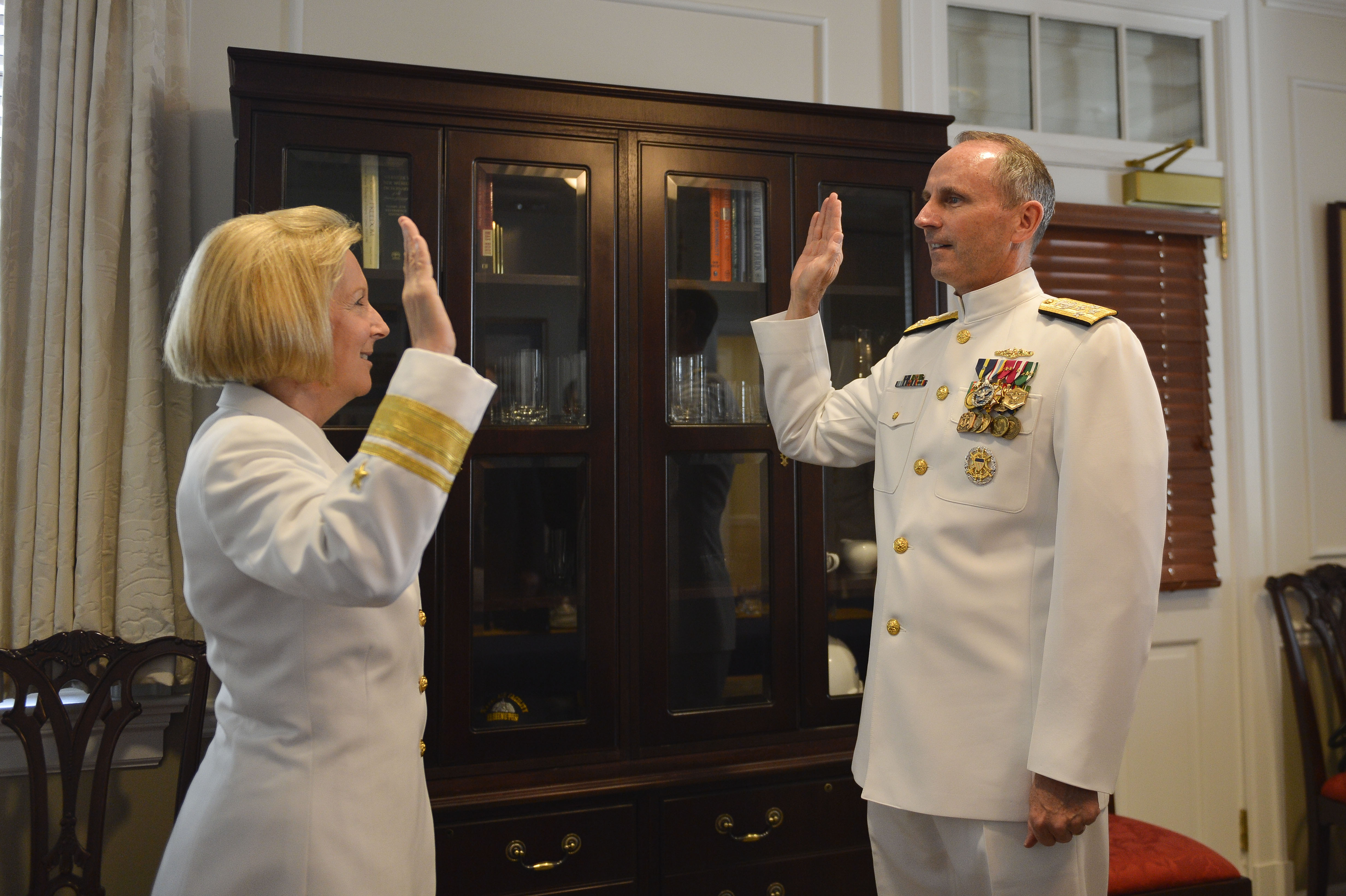
Braun is promoted to vice admiral by the Chief of Naval Operations, Admiral Jonathan W. Greenert on August 13, 2012.

Staff assignments include naval intern on the Joint Staff (J3), Aviation Initial Assignments detailer at Navy Personnel Command, facilitator for the Naval Safety Center's Culture Workshop Program and chief of staff, CNO Operations and Plans supporting chief of Naval Operations (OPNAV) N3/N5.

Upon selection to flag rank, Braun reported to Navy Recruiting Command where she served as deputy commander and commander until 2009. Subsequently, she was assigned as director, Total Force Management for the Deputy Chief of Naval Operations for Information Dominance (OPNAV N2/N6).

Braun served as deputy director, European Plans and Operations Center (ECJ-3), United States European Command, Patch Barracks, Stuttgart, Germany.

Braun has accumulated over 5,800 flight hours in Navy aircraft. Her awards include the Defense Superior Service Medal, Legion of Merit (three awards), Meritorious Service Medal (four awards), the Navy and Marine Corps Commendation Medal (two awards), and the Navy and Marine Corps Achievement Medal (three awards).

In May 2012, Braun was nominated for the rank of vice admiral and Chief of Navy Reserve. On 13 August 2012, she relieved Vice Admiral Dirk J. Debbink. On 26 September 2016, she was relieved by Vice Admiral Luke M. McCollum.

Military offices
| Preceded by Dirk J. Debbink | Chief of the United States Navy Reserve; 2012–2016 | Succeeded by Luke M. McCollum |
