= United States Navy Ceremonial Guard =

United States Navy unit

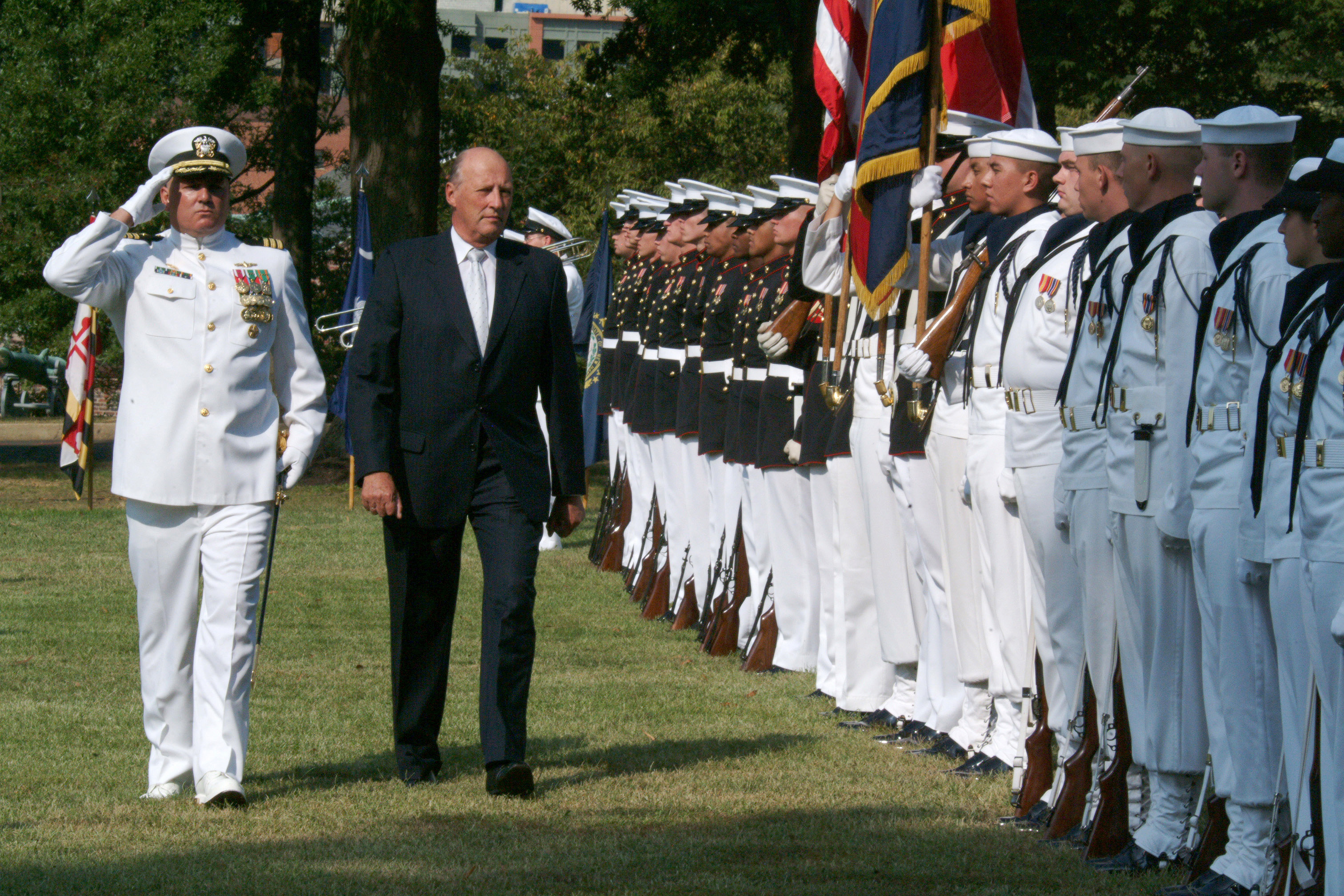
King Harald V of Norway inspects the USN CG during an arrival ceremony in Washington, D.C.

The United States Navy Ceremonial Guard is the official ceremonial unit of the United States Navy. It is responsible for the performance of public duties in the U.S. Navy. The guard is composed of 200+ enlisted navy personnel. It is based at the Naval District Washington, Washington Navy Yard, Washington D.C. It is currently led by Commander Alexander McMahon.

== Overview ==
The Ceremonial Guard, with the United States Air Force Honor Guard and the 3rd U.S. Infantry Regiment (The Old Guard) during an inaugural parade.

Established in 1931, the guard represents the Navy in the Presidential, Joint Armed Services, Navy and public ceremonies in the nation's capital and around the world. Each member is trained to be motionless for extended periods of time so that they are prepared to hold their bearing through the entirety of the longest of military ceremonies. They are trained in the areas of rifle drill manual and marching as well as the daily labor of maintaining the rigorous physical and uniform standards demanded of Ceremonial Guardsmen.

=== List of specialized platoons ===
- HQ

TRIAD

  - Commanding Officer: Commander Ken Warford
  - Commander: William Hessel
  - Command master chief petty officer: Deirdre Parker
- Bravo Company
  - 1st Platoon - Casket Bearer
  - 2nd Platoon - Firing Party
- Charlie Company
  - 1st Platoon - Color Guard
  - 2nd Platoon - Ceremonial Drill Team

=== Requirements ===
- Recruits must undergo an intensive 10-week training program before they are considered a guardsman.
- It is a requirement for a sailor in the ceremonial guard to have a minimum height of 183 centimeters (6 ft 0 in). Officers are required to have a minimum height of 178 centimeters (5 ft 10 in).
- Ceremonial Guardsmen are required to remain sober while on duty.

== Mission ==
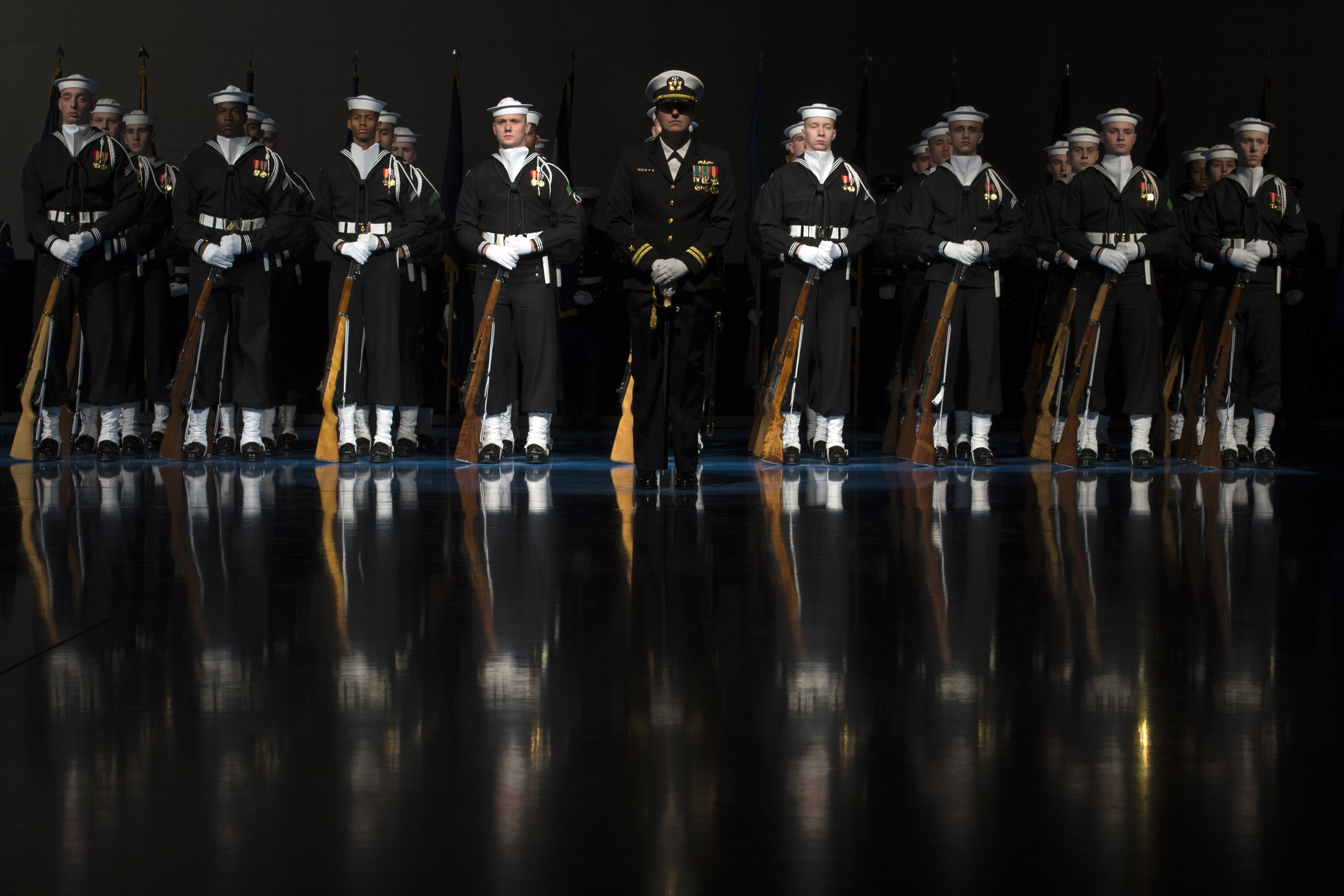
U.S. Navy Ceremonial Guard from the Naval District Washington, D.C. stand in formation for the Armed Forces Full Honor Farewell Review Ceremony in honor of the Secretary of Defense at Joint Base Myer-Henderson Hall in January 2017.

The United States Navy Ceremonial Guard provides along with ceremonial honour guards from the U.S. Army, U.S. Marine Corps, U.S. Air Force, and the U.S. Coast Guard during State visits to the United States at the White House and the Pentagon, as well as the inaugural parade every four years, and Independence Day observances in Washington, D.C. Its personnel serve as Casket bearers, Color guards, and Firing parties at the funerals of Naval Servicemen at the Arlington National Cemetery. They also have the Navy ceremonial Guard Drill team that performs all over and outside the U.S.

== Navy Ceremonial Duty Ribbon ==
Navy Ceremonial Duty Ribbon

The Navy Ceremonial Duty Ribbon is presented to members of the Ceremonial Guard who receives his full honors qualification and completes a standard tour of duty (2 years) with the United States Navy Ceremonial Guard. It was established on 12 December 2003 by the order of the Secretary of the Navy Gordon R. England. On 17 January 2012, the name of the Navy Ceremonial Duty Ribbon was changed from the U.S. Navy Ceremonial Guard Ribbon in order to encompass those personnel who have successfully completed a standard tour of duty on board the USS Constitution. Multiple awards of the Navy Ceremonial Duty Ribbon are denoted by bronze service stars, while only one award of the ribbon is authorized for each tour of duty.

== Uniform ==
For the Ceremonial Guard, the enlisted Full Dress uniforms are more elaborate with the wearing of a white pistol belt, ascot and dress aiguillette (the latter two are white for winter and navy blue for summer), and white canvas leggings. This uniform is due to be replaced in 2021.

== Gallery ==
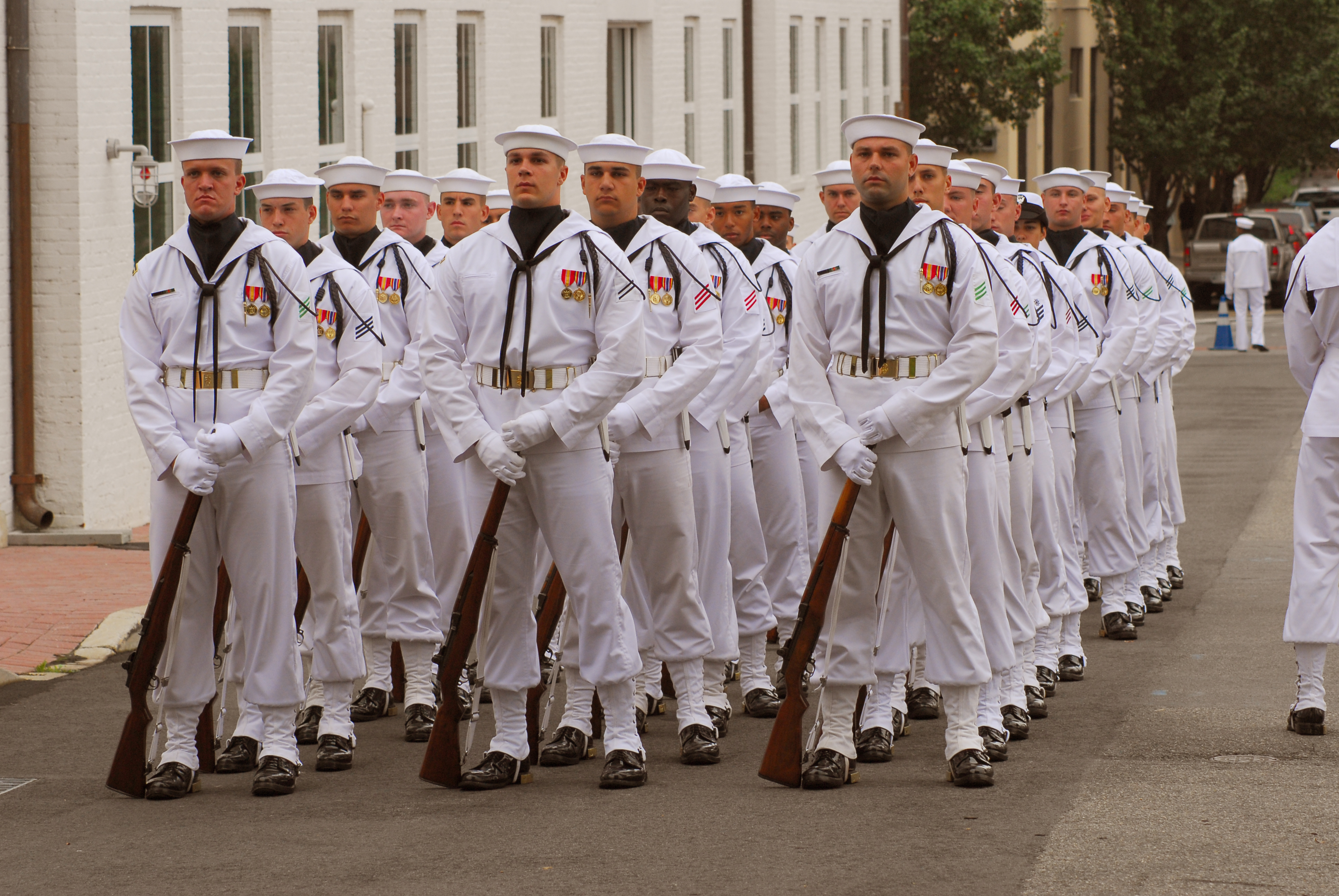
Enlisted Full Dress Whites worn at a Change of Command Ceremony in 2009.

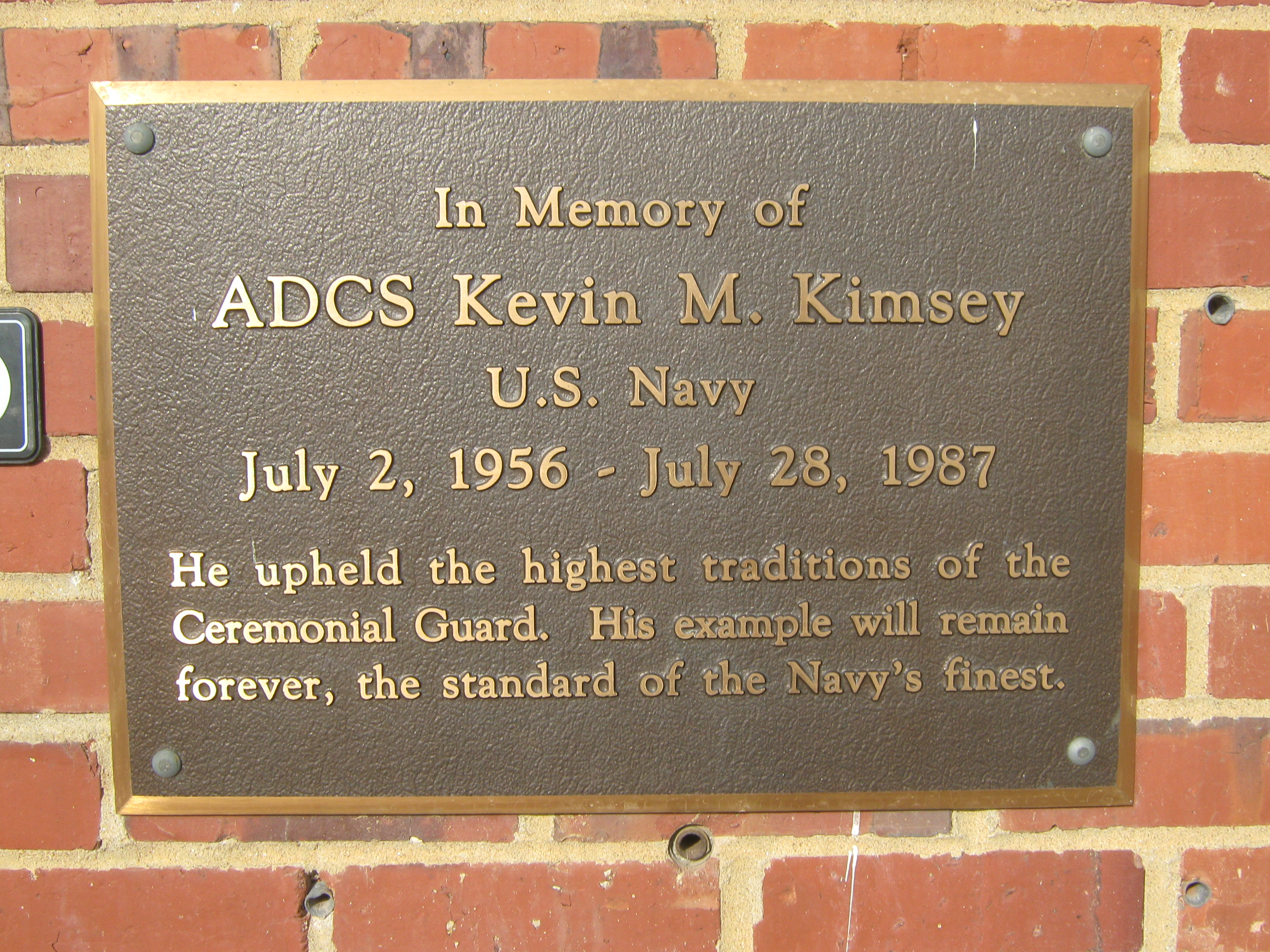
The Kevin M. Kimsey plaque.

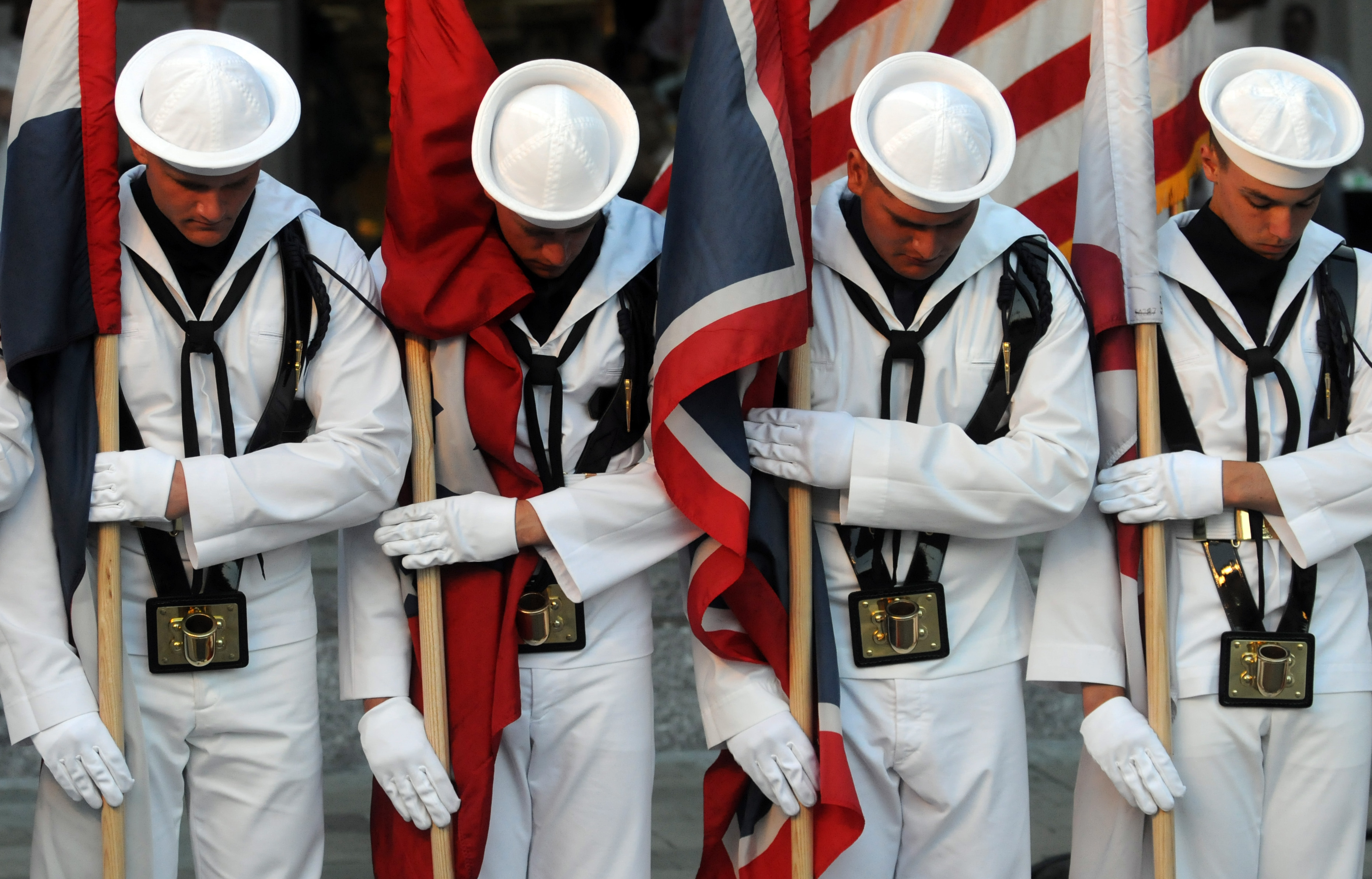
Sailors assigned to the Ceremonial Guard color guard.

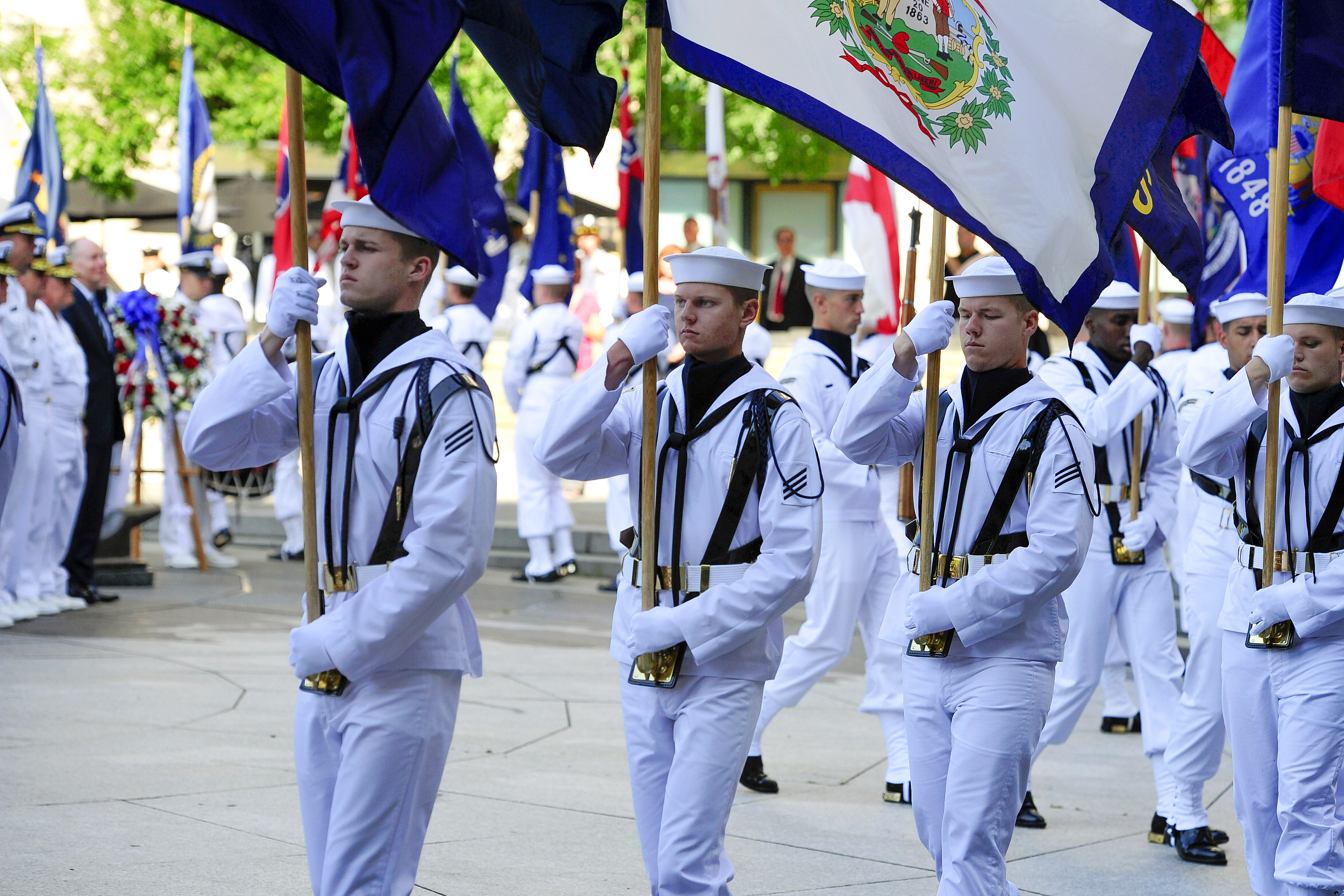
Members of the Navy Ceremonial Guard parade the fifty state flags before a wreath-laying ceremony at the Navy Memorial in Washington D.C.

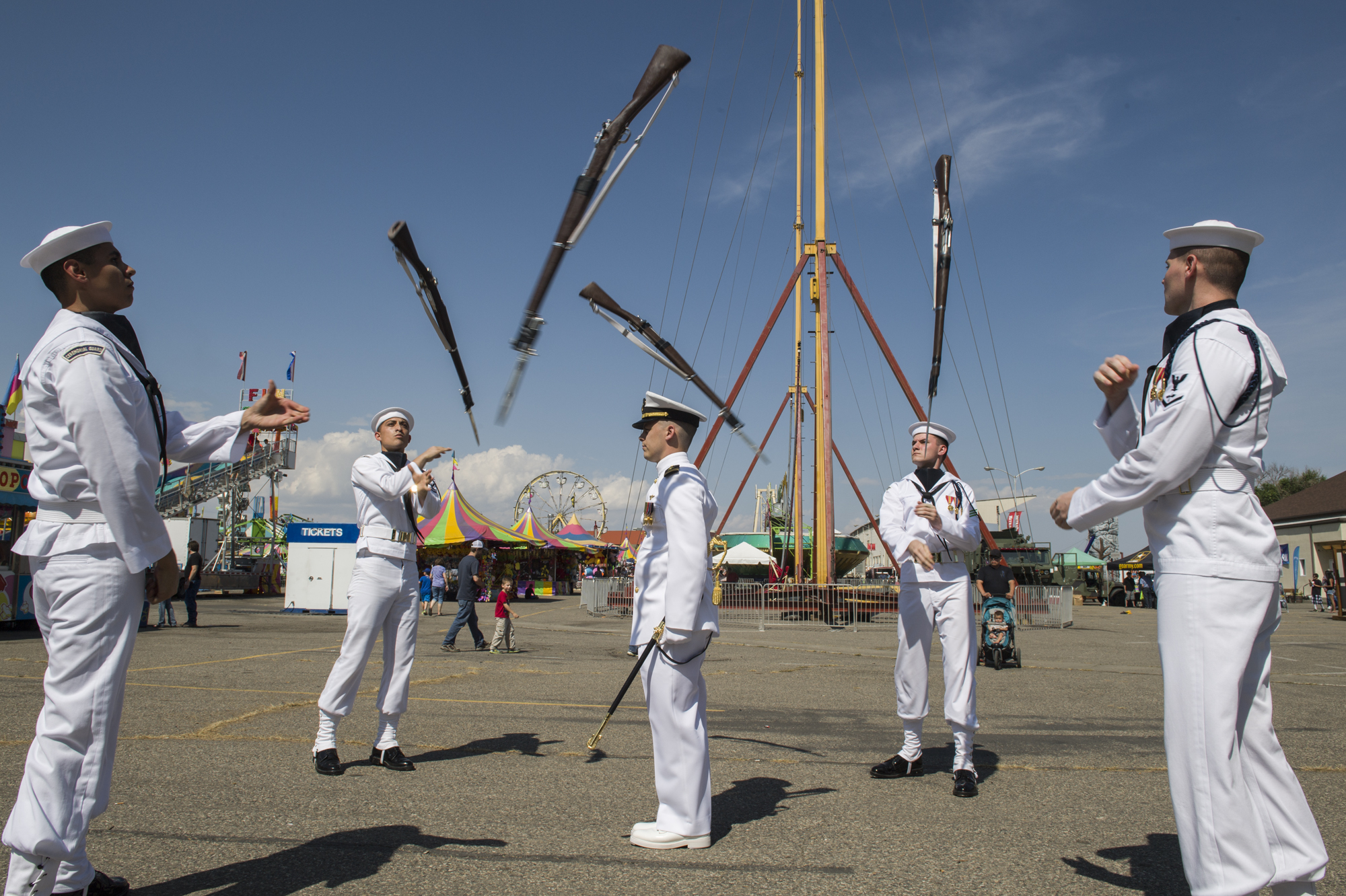
The Navy Ceremonial Guard Drill Team perform during Navy Week in Montana.

== See also ==
- United States Navy Band
- Naval District Washington
- 3rd U.S. Infantry Regiment (The Old Guard)
- Marine Barracks, Washington, D.C.
- United States Air Force Honor Guard
