= Pierre N. Charbonnet Jr. =

United States Navy admiral

- Born: December 22, 1922; San Francisco, California
- Died: November 24, 2005 (aged 82); Cambridge, Maryland
- Burial place: Arlington National Cemetery
- Military career
- Allegiance: United States
- Branch: United States Navy
- Service years: 1941–1978
- Rank: Vice Admiral
- Commands: United States Naval Reserve; Carrier Division 6 Eighth Naval District; Carrier Division 7 USS Coral Sea (CVA-43); USS Marias (AO-57); Carrier Air Group 8 VF-18A; VBF-82; VF-24
- Conflicts: World War II
- Awards: Navy Distinguished Service Medal; Legion of Merit (4); Distinguished Flying Cross (3); Air Medal (7)

Pierre Numa Charbonnet Jr. (December 22, 1922 – November 24, 2005) was a vice admiral in the United States Navy. A 1941 graduate of the United States Naval Academy, he was Chief of the United States Naval Reserve from August 1974 until September 1978. From 1971 until 1974, then a rear admiral, he served as Commander Fleet Air Mediterranean for the United States Sixth Fleet. His awards included the Navy Distinguished Service Medal, Legion of Merit, Distinguished Flying Cross and Air Medal. He retired on September 1, 1978. Charbonnet died in 2005 and is buried at Arlington National Cemetery.
