= John G. Cotton =

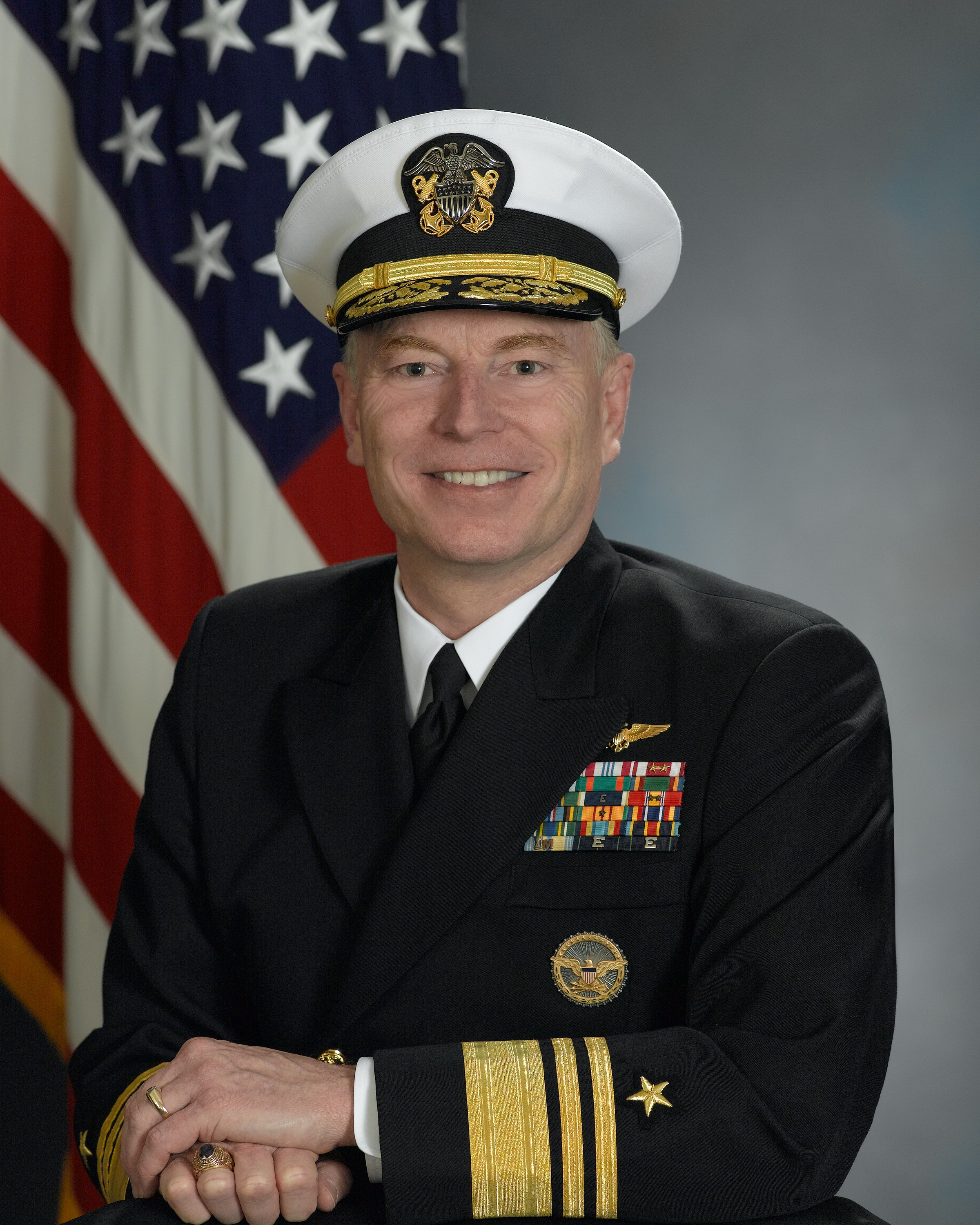
- Born: 1951 (age 74–75)
- Military career
- Allegiance: United States
- Branch: United States Navy
- Service years: 1969–2008
- Rank: Vice Admiral
- Commands: United States Navy Reserve; NAS Keflavik; VFA-204; VA-2082
- Conflicts: Vietnam War
- Awards: Navy Distinguished Service Medal; Legion of Merit

John Gould Cotton (born 1951) is a retired vice admiral in the United States Navy. He was Chief of the United States Navy Reserve from October 2003 until July 2008. He is currently a member of the Defense Department's Reserve Forces Policy Board.
