= Richard S. Lofgren =

American financial executive and retired naval officer

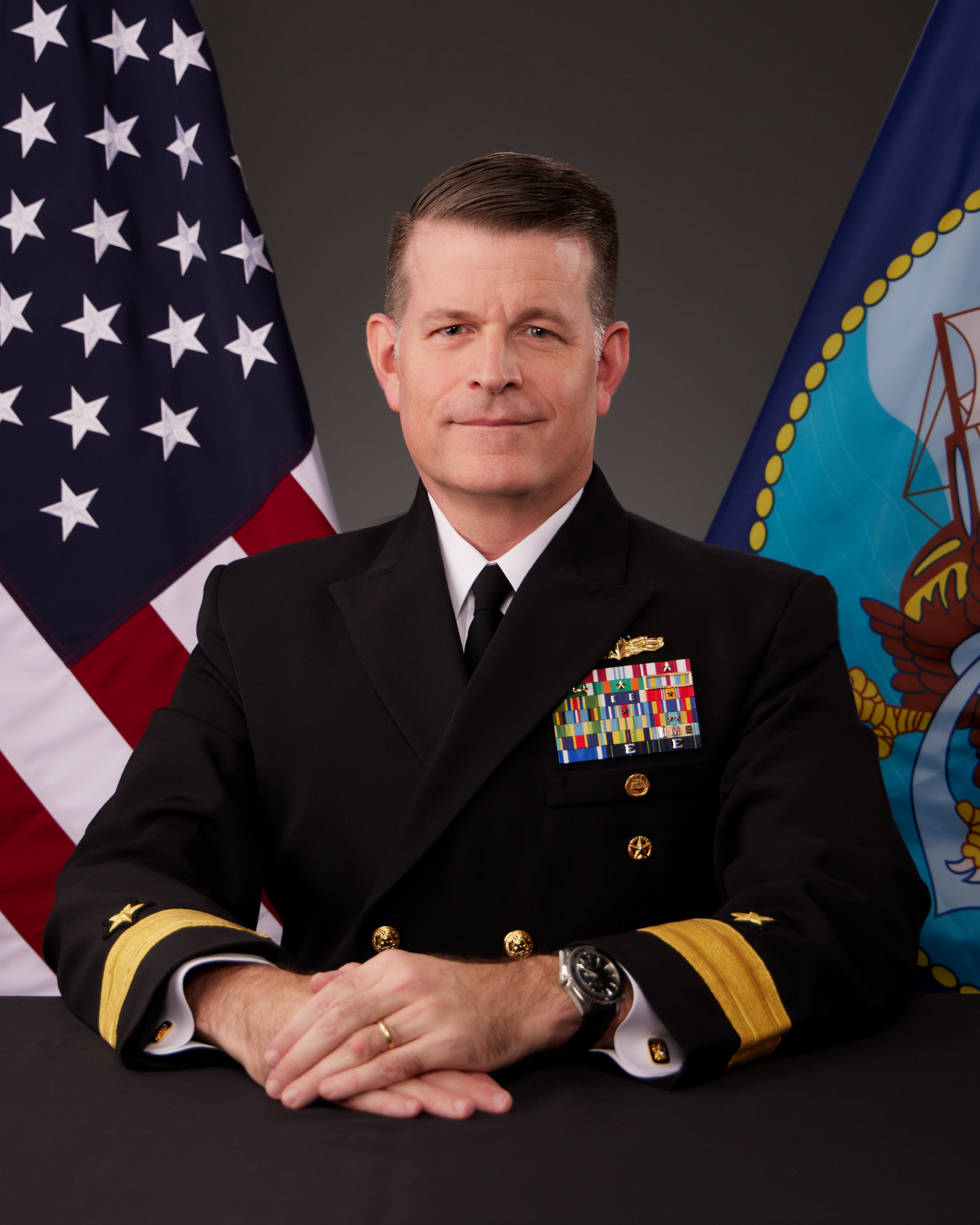
- Official portrait, 2025
- Born: 27 February 1971 (age 55); Patuxent River, Maryland, U.S.
- Alma mater: University of Texas at Austin (BA)
- Military career
- Allegiance: United States
- Branch: United States Navy; Navy Reserve
- Service years: 1993–2026
- Rank: Rear Admiral (lower half)
- Commands: Acting Chief of Navy Reserve; Coastal Riverine Squadron 8 Inshore Boat Unit 15
- Awards: Legion of Merit (4); Defense Meritorious Service Medal; Meritorious Service Medal (2)
- Other work: Board of Visitors, United States Merchant Marine Academy

Richard S. Lofgren (born Patuxent River, Maryland) is an American financial executive and retired United States Navy Reserve rear admiral (lower half) who served as acting Chief of Navy Reserve from September 2025 to September 2026. He is a managing director at Goldman Sachs and a presidential appointee to the Board of Visitors of the United States Merchant Marine Academy.

== Early life and education ==
The son and grandson of naval aviators, Lofgren graduated from the University of Texas at Austin in 1993 with a Bachelor of Arts degree in history. He later completed the Navy Senior Leader Seminar at the Naval Postgraduate School and Joint Professional Military Education at the Naval War College's Command and Staff College.

== Naval career ==
=== Active duty ===
Lofgren received his commission as an ensign through the Naval Reserve Officers Training Corps in 1993. After completing Surface Warfare Officer School and Steam Engineering School in Newport, Rhode Island, he reported aboard USS Wasp (LHD-1) in Norfolk, Virginia, and deployed in support of Operation Uphold Democracy in Haiti and Operation Joint Resolve in the Balkans.

=== Navy Reserve ===
Lofgren affiliated with the United States Navy Reserve on 11 September 2001, joining Navy Reserve Commander in Chief Pacific Fleet Detachment ONE ONE ONE (CINPACFLT 111) as a training officer. His other early reserve assignments included intelligence officer for Naval Embarked Advisory Team ONE ONE ONE (NEAT 111), executive officer of Inshore Boat Unit FOURTEEN (IBU-14), and N7 for NR United States Pacific Command Detachment ONE ONE ONE (USPACOM Det 111). He later served in several riverine units, including as a plankowner of Maritime Expeditionary Security Squadron ELEVEN (MSRON 11), senior assessor (N7R-TEU) for Coastal Riverine Group ONE (CRG-1), and Reserve Deputy Commodore for Coastal Riverine Group TWO (CRG-2).

His command tours include Recruit Support Unit ONE ONE FIVE ZERO (RSU 1150), Inshore Boat Unit FIFTEEN (IBU-15), Maritime Expeditionary Command and Control Division THREE ONE (C2DIV31), Maritime Civil Affairs and Security Training Squadron ONE (MCASTRONONE), NR Commander LCS Squadron ONE (COMLCSRON ONE) Surface Warfare Mission Module, Coastal Riverine / Maritime Expeditionary Security Squadron EIGHT (CORIVRON / MSRON 8), and NR Commander Fourth Fleet (C4F/USNAVSOUTH). He also served as co-director for the Coastal Riverine Force within the Surface Warfare Reserve Enterprise.

As a reservist, Lofgren deployed with IBU-14 in 2005 in support of Operation Enduring Freedom and Operation Iraqi Freedom, and to Djibouti in 2022 and 2023 as Chief Staff Officer for Camp Titan, Camp Lemonnier.

=== Flag officer assignments ===
Lofgren was promoted to rear admiral (lower half) in 2023. In his initial flag assignment, he served as Vice Commander, U.S. 4th Fleet / U.S. Naval Forces Southern Command, from 2023 to 2025. On 2 September 2025, he became Acting Chief of Navy Reserve and Acting Commander, Navy Reserve Force, leading approximately 59,000 reserve personnel. In that role, he testified before the Senate Appropriations Committee on the Navy Reserve's fiscal year 2027 budget in April 2026. He retired in September 2026.

== Civilian career ==
Lofgren began his civilian career as a financial consultant at Merrill Lynch, then spent a decade in leadership roles at several registered investment adviser firms. He later served as a managing director in the private bank at JPMorgan Chase and in the adviser custody business at Schwab.

He is a managing director at Goldman Sachs, where he has worked on the firm's custody business for registered investment advisers.

== Board of Visitors ==
Lofgren is one of the presidential appointees to the Board of Visitors of the United States Merchant Marine Academy. The board, which includes members of Congress, five presidential appointees and ex officio members, visits the academy annually and reports to the President on its morale and discipline, curriculum, facilities and finances.

== Awards and decorations ==
Lofgren's decorations include:

- Legion of Merit (four awards)
- Defense Meritorious Service Medal
- Meritorious Service Medal (two awards)
- Navy and Marine Corps Commendation Medal (four awards)
- Navy and Marine Corps Achievement Medal (two awards)
