= Naval District Washington =

One of eleven naval regions of the U.S. Navy

Coordinates: 38.8746°N 76.9946°W

Commandant, Naval District Washington Naval District Washington
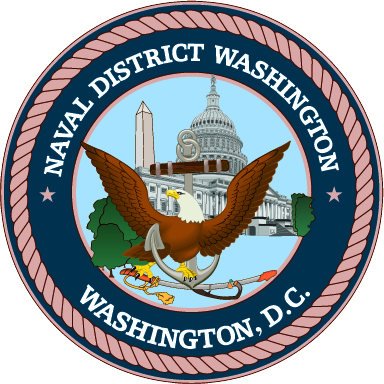
- Command insignia of Naval District Washington
- Active: 1903 - present
- Country: United States
- Branch: United States Navy
- Type: Region Commander
- Role: Management of naval installations and shore staff in the National Capital Region
- Part of: Naval Installations Command
- HQ: Washington Navy Yard, Washington, DC
- Nickname: NDW
- Website: ndw.cnic.navy.mil

Commanders
- Current commander: RADM Suzanne M. Bailey

The Naval District Washington, one of eleven current naval regions, is responsible to Commander, Navy Installations Command for the operation and management of Naval shore installations in the Washington D.C. Metropolitan Area. Naval District Washington is currently the only remaining naval district from the 1900s era, making it the oldest of the current naval regions. The Naval District's Commandant is headquartered at the Washington Navy Yard only a few yards away from the Commander, Navy Installations Command headquarters.

== History ==
As part of the formation of most of the Naval Districts in 1903, Naval District Washington was stood up under the command of the Commandant, Washington Navy Yard. Originally named the Potomac River Naval Command, it was formed from the areas of the Potomac River up to the Great Falls, the District of Columbia, and the Counties of Prince Georges, Montgomery, St. Mary's, Calvert, and Charles in Maryland; Arlington, Fairfax, Stafford, King George, Prince William, and Westmoreland Counties in Virginia, less the Marine Barracks, Quantico, Virginia and the Marine Barracks, Washington, D.C.

== Subordinate Commands ==
=== As Echelon III Commander ===
NDW reports to Commander Naval Installations Command as an Echelon III commander over the following installations:

- Naval Support Activity Washington
  - Washington Navy Yard
  - Naval Support Facility Naval Research Laboratory
  - Naval Support Facility Suitland, supporting the Office of Naval Intelligence
  - Naval Support Facility Naval Observatory
  - Naval Support Facility Arlington
  - Naval Support Facility Carderock, supporting the Carderock Division of the Naval Surface Warfare Center
- Naval Support Activity South Potomac
  - Naval Support Facility Indian Head supporting Joint Interoperability Test Command, among others
  - Naval Support Facility Dahlgren supporting Naval Surface Warfare Center Dahlgren Division
- Naval Air Station Patuxent River
- Naval Support Activity Annapolis
  - United States Naval Academy
  - Naval Research Laboratory, Chesapeake Beach Detachment
  - Naval Reserve Center Baltimore
- Naval Support Facility Thurmont, commonly known as Camp David
- Naval Support Activity Bethesda, which hosts the Walter Reed National Military Medical Center

=== As Echelon II Commander ===
NDW maintains a direct reporting role to the Chief of Naval Operations as an Echelon II commander in its role as the immediate superior in command (ISIC) for the U.S. Navy Ceremonial Guard at Joint Base Anacostia–Bolling, Human Resources Office Washington and Navy Exchange Bethesda.

== See also ==
- United States Army Military District of Washington
- Air Force District of Washington
- Joint Force Headquarters National Capital Region
