= Mustin (disambiguation) =

Mustin is a municipality in Mecklenburg-Vorpommern, Germany.

Mustin may also refer to:

- Mustin, Schleswig-Holstein, a municipality in Schleswig-Holstein, Germany
- Mustin family, an American family with a tradition of service in the United States Navy
  - Henry C. Mustin (disambiguation)
- Burt Mustin (1884–1977), American actor
- USS Mustin, the name of more than one United States Navy ship
