= Henry C. Mustin =

Henry C. Mustin may refer to:

- Henry C. Mustin (1874–1923), pioneering naval aviator
  - USS Mustin, two ships of the U.S. Navy
  - Henry C. Mustin Naval Air Facility
- Henry C. Mustin (1933–2016), his grandson, vice admiral in the U.S. Navy
