= Mustin family =

United States Navy family

The Mustin Family
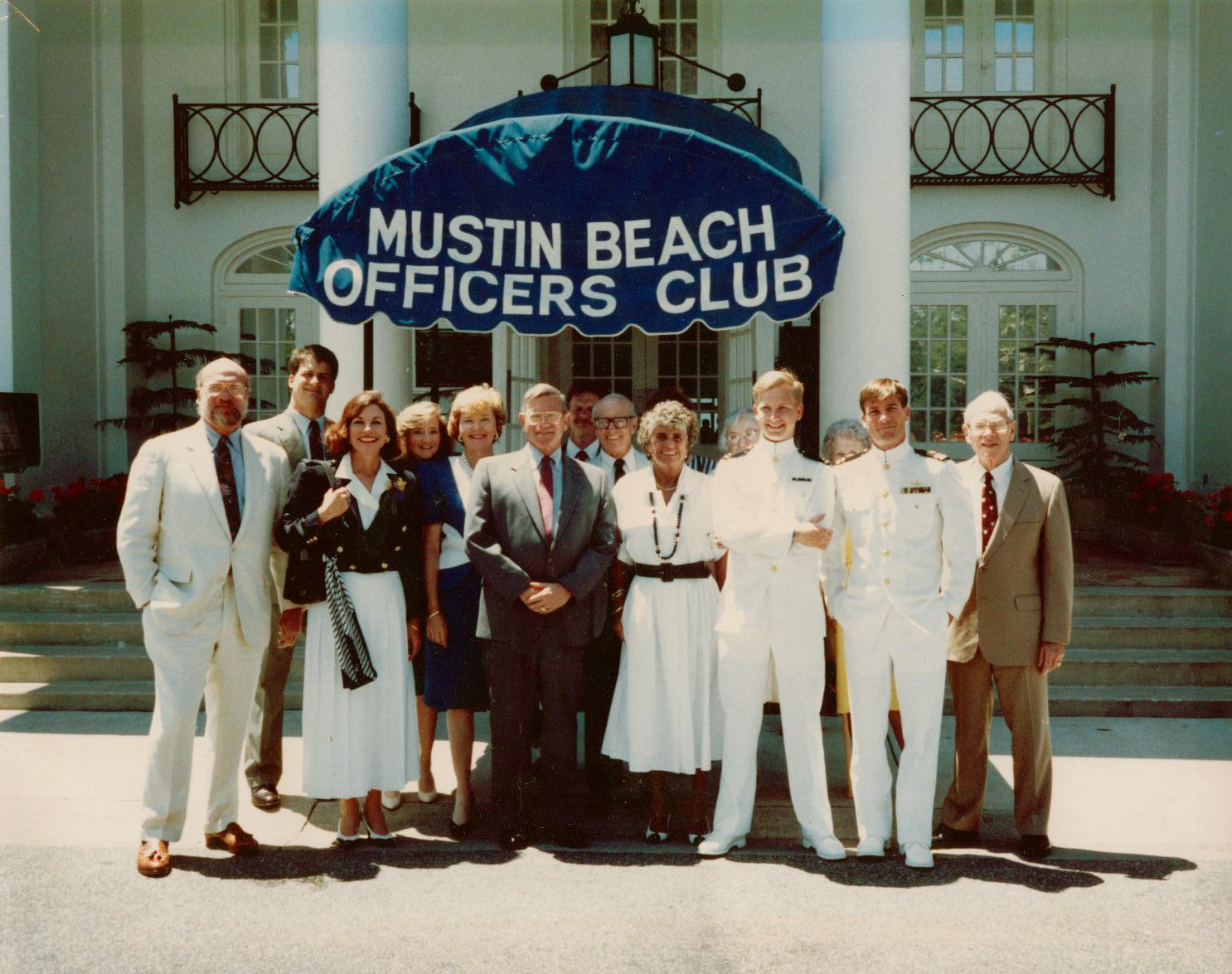
- Mustin Family at Mustin beach on November 3, 1989
- Origin: United States
- Members: Admiral Thomas B. Howard; Admiral George D. Murray; General Richard Kennon; Vice Admiral Lloyd M. Mustin; Vice Admiral Henry C. "Hank" Mustin; Vice Admiral John B. Mustin; Rear Admiral Thomas H. Morton; Major General George Barnett; Commodore Beverley Kennon; Commodore Arthur Sinclair; Captain Douglas L. Howard; Captain Henry Croskey Mustin; Captain Lloyd M. Mustin II; Captain Tracy P. Mustin; Lieutenant Commander Henry A. Mustin; Lieutenant Commander Thomas M. Mustin; Commander Lloyd M. “Link” Mustin III; Lieutenant Gordon S. Mustin; Lieutenant Sarah N. Mustin; Lieutenant Margaret M. Jackson; Tom Mustin (TV news anchor on ABC-7 in Denver); Tyler Mustin (Feature Producer at Fox Sports); Will Mustin (Filmmaker); Hayley Mustin (Commercial Real Estate Power Broker)
- Connected families: Barnett, Howard, Kennon, Morton, Montague Murray, Sinclair, House of Windsor
- Distinctions: Five Wars in 100 Years
- Traditions: US Navy

The Mustin family has recorded a tradition of service in the United States Navy extending from 1896 to the present. Their naval roots trace back to the first Arthur Sinclair, of Scalloway, in Shetland, father of Commodore Arthur Sinclair, who as a boy seaman sailed with Commodore George Anson in 1740, on a British mission to capture Spanish possessions in the Pacific, during the War of Jenkins' Ear. He later settled in Colonial Virginia and served in the Continental Navy during the American Revolution. Probably the most famous member was Henry Croskey Mustin, a pioneering naval aviator who was designated Navy Air Pilot No. 3 and later Naval Aviator No. 11. Two U.S. Navy destroyers have borne the name Mustin in honor of members of the family, U.S. Navy destroyer USS Mustin (DD-413) and the U.S. Navy guided-missile destroyer USS Mustin (DDG-89).

== Family ==
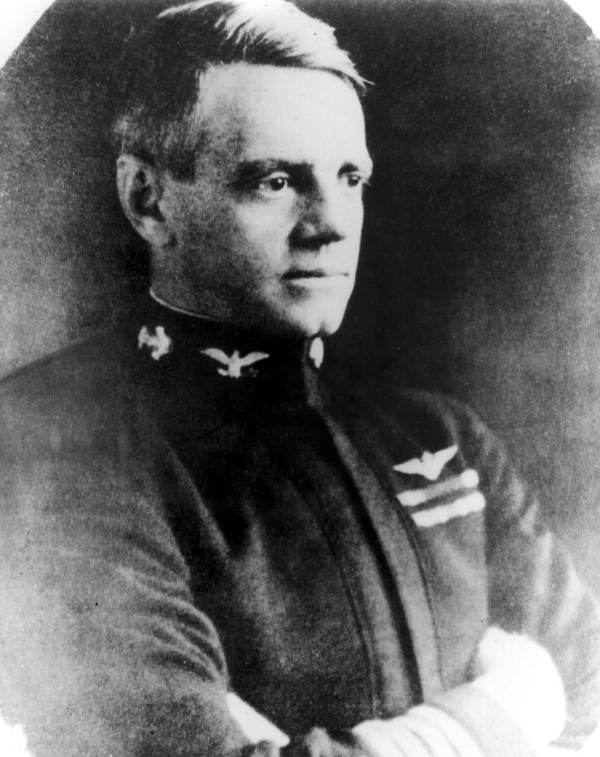
Henry Croskey Mustin

Often referred to as "The Father of Naval Aviation," Captain Henry C. Mustin (1874–1923), an 1896 graduate of the U.S. Naval Academy, was the principal architect for the concept of the catapult launch. He married Corinne DeForest Montague, great-granddaughter of Commodore Arthur Sinclair, and a first cousin and close confidante of Wallis Simpson who became involved in a controversial relationship with King Edward VIII of Great Britain who abdicated to marry her in 1936. The Mustins had three children: Lloyd M., Henry A. and Gordon S.

As a Lieutenant Commander in January 1914, Mustin established Naval Aeronautic Station Pensacola, the Navy's first permanent air station together with a flight school, and became its first Commanding Officer. The first flight was made from the station on February 2 by LT J. H. Towers and ENS G. de Chevalier. On November 5, 1915, while underway, LCDR Mustin successfully flew an AB-2 flying boat off the stern of the USS North Carolina (ACR-12) in Pensacola Bay, FL, making the first ever recorded catapult launching from a ship underway. In 1899, he earned a commendation for distinguished service in the capture of Vigan, Philippines. The first operational missions of naval aircraft were flown under his command during the Veracruz operation in 1914 and he was the first to hold the title: Commander, Aircraft Squadrons, Pacific Fleet. Designated Naval Aviator Number Eleven, Captain Mustin was instrumental in the design of the Naval Aviator Insignia.

His eldest son, Vice Admiral Lloyd M. Mustin, (1911–1999), a 1932 graduate of the U.S. Naval Academy, took part in developing the Navy's first lead-computing anti-aircraft gun sight, which proved of major importance in the air-sea actions of World War II, and served on the cruiser USS Atlanta (CL-51) during the naval battle of Guadalcanal. His ship was lost during that action; with other survivors he landed on Guadalcanal and served ashore with a naval unit attached to the 1st Marine Division. His post-war service included commands at sea and development and evaluation of weapon systems. He later served as director of operations for the Joint Chiefs of Staff.

Vice Admiral Mustin's two sons, retired Navy Vice Admiral Henry C. Mustin and Lieutenant Commander Thomas M. Mustin continued their family's tradition of military service. Vice Admiral Mustin, a 1955 graduate of the U.S. Naval Academy, was a decorated Vietnam veteran who served in the 1980s as the Naval Inspector General, Commander, Second Fleet and Deputy Chief of Naval Operations for Plans and Policy. Lieutenant Commander Mustin, also a Naval Academy graduate (1962) earned a Bronze Star during the Vietnam War for river patrol combat action.

Additionally, two of Vice Admiral Henry C. Mustin's sons and one daughter-in-law served in the Navy. Captain Lloyd M. Mustin II and his wife, Captain Tracy Mustin, retired in 2015. Vice Admiral John B. Mustin, a 1990 graduate of the U.S. Naval Academy, became the Chief of Navy Reserve (CNR), retiring in 2024. He briefly returned to active duty service as the Commanding Officer of Inshore Boat Unit 22, deployed to Kuwait, from 2004–2005 and was selected for promotion to rear admiral (lower half) in March 2016. In May 2020, RADM John Mustin was nominated for promotion to vice admiral and assignment as Chief of Navy Reserve. VADM Hank Mustin's third son, Tom Mustin, worked as an actor before becoming a TV news reporter. He was a news anchor on CBS4 in Denver for 15 years before joining ABC-7 in 2018.

VADM Hank Mustin's grandson, Commander Lloyd “Link” Mustin, is currently serving in the U.S. Navy.

Several facilities have borne the name Mustin in honor of the Mustin family. These include two destroyers of the United States Navy named USS Mustin, as well as Mustin Beach, the Mustin Beach Officers' Club, and Mustin Hall (the Bachelor Officers' Quarters) aboard Naval Air Station Pensacola, Florida. Additionally, the Henry C. Mustin Naval Air Facility was operational at the Philadelphia Navy Yard from 1926 to 1963.

=== Family tree ===
I.
II.
III.
IV.

CAPT Henry C. Mustin (1874–1923)	Corinne DeForest Montague	ADM George D. Murray (1889-1956)
VADM Lloyd M. Mustin (1911-1999)	Emily Morton Mustin	LCDR Henry A. Mustin	LT Gordon S. Mustin
VADM Henry C. (Hank) Mustin (1933-2016)	LCDR Thomas M. Mustin
VADM John Mustin (Chief of Navy Reserve)	Tom Mustin (b. 1960)	Captain Lloyd M. Mustin II (b. 1959)	Captain Tracy Mustin

== Bibliography ==
Notes

References

- KCNC-TV (2015). "Tom Mustin". CBS4. Archived from the original on October 31, 2015.
- Morton, John Fass (2003). Mustin: A Naval Family of the Twentieth Century. United States Naval Institute. ISBN 9781591144922. – Total pages: 460
- Perkins, Allison (December 14, 2001). "Seaworthy- Navy names destroyer for local man's family". News & Record.
- United States Secretary of the Navy (March 16, 2016). "FY-17 Reserve Rear Admiral (Lower Half) Line and Staff Corps Selection". United States Navy. Archived from the original on March 24, 2016.
- United States Navy (2016). "Named to honor the Mustin family". United States Navy. Archived from the original on June 27, 2013.
