= Lloyd M. Mustin =

United States Navy admiral

Lloyd Montague Mustin
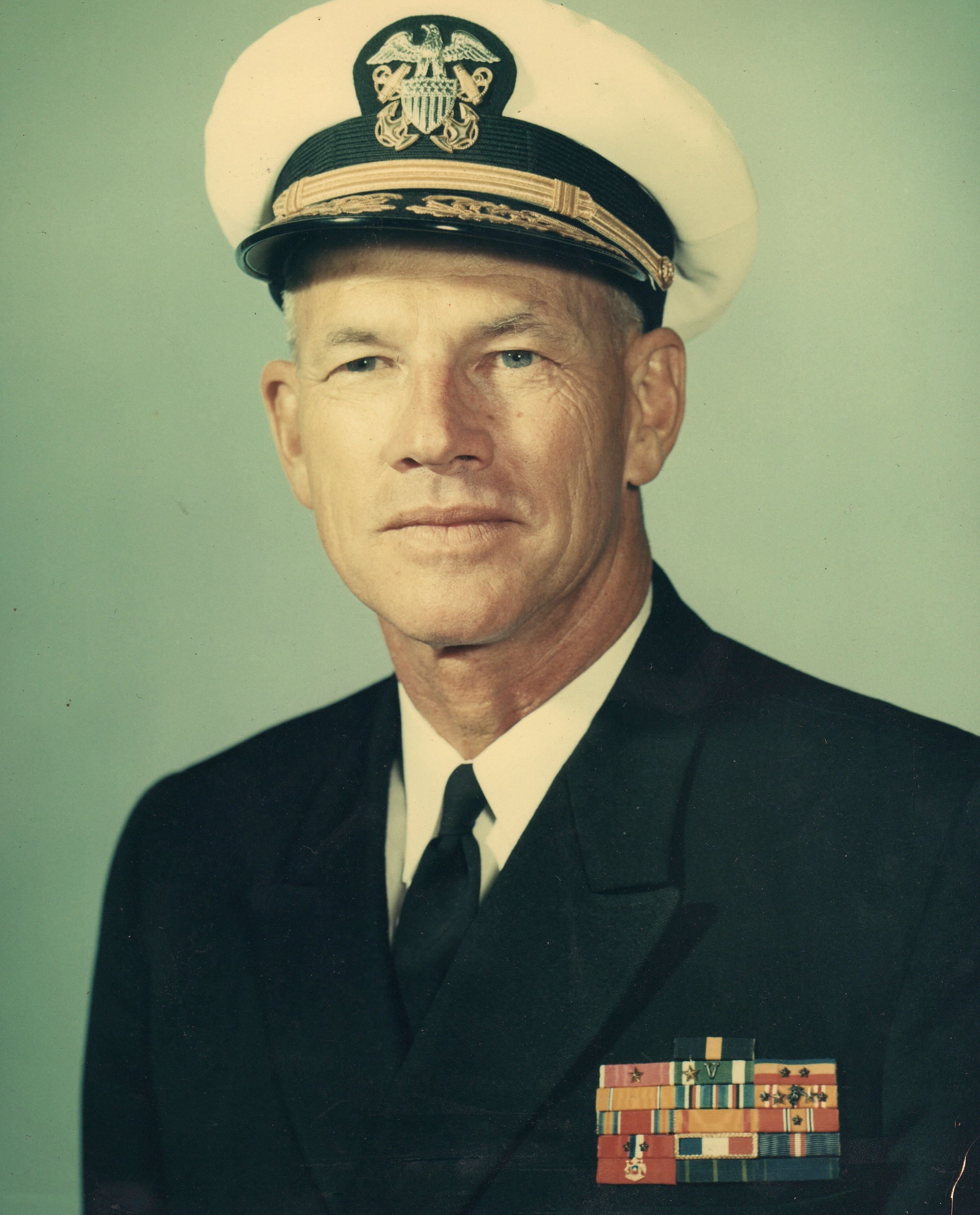
- Vice Admiral Lloyd M. Mustin
- Born: July 30, 1911; Philadelphia, Pennsylvania, U.S.
- Died: January 21, 1999 (aged 87); Coronado, California, U.S.
- Burial place: United States Naval Academy
- Spouse: Emily Proctor Morton
- Relatives: VADM Henry C. Mustin (son); VADM John B. Mustin, USN (grandson)
- Military career
- Allegiance: United States
- Branch: United States Navy
- Service years: 1932–1971
- Rank: Vice Admiral
- Commands: Defense Atomic Support Agency; Amphibious Force, Atlantic Fleet; USS Piedmont; USS Keppler; USS Piedmont
- Conflicts: World War II; Guadalcanal campaign; Marianas Islands campaign; Philippines campaign
- Awards: Distinguished Service Medal (2); Legion of Merit (2); Navy Commendation Medal (2)

Lloyd Montague Mustin (July 30, 1911 – January 21, 1999) was a vice admiral in the United States Navy and among the namesakes of USS Mustin (DDG-89). He took part in developing the Navy's first lead-computing anti-aircraft gun sight, which proved of major importance in the air-sea actions of World War II, and he served on the cruiser USS Atlanta during the naval battle of Guadalcanal. His ship was lost during that action, and with other survivors he landed on Guadalcanal and served ashore with a naval unit attached to the First Marine Division. His postwar service included commands at sea and development and evaluation of weapon systems. He later served as director of operations for the Joint Chiefs of Staff during the Vietnam War.

== Early life and career ==
Mustin was born on July 30, 1911, at the Navy Yard, Philadelphia, Pennsylvania, to a family steeped in naval tradition. His father, Captain Henry C. Mustin, USN, was a pioneer naval aviator who established the first naval air station and launched the first aircraft from a ship underway. The destroyer USS Mustin (DD-413) was named for him along with the Henry C. Mustin Naval Air Facility and the Mustin Beach Club at NAS Pensacola. Mustin's father died when he was twelve years old and his mother, Corinne DeForest Montague (great-granddaughter of Commodore Arthur Sinclair and a first cousin and close confidante of Wallis Simpson), married Vice Admiral George Murray, USN, a close friend and one-time student of Mustin's father. Murray was captain of USS Enterprise (CV-6) during the Battle of Midway and the Doolittle Raid. At the end of the war, he accepted the surrender of Japan in the Marianas on behalf of Commander in Chief, Pacific Fleet and Pacific Ocean Areas.

The destroyer USS Sinclair (DD-275) was named for Mustin's twice-great-grandfather, Commodore Arthur Sinclair, USN, who commanded the US Naval Squadron on Lake Ontario during the War of 1812. Additionally, his great grandfather, Captain Arthur Sinclair, USN, commanded one of Commodore Perry's ships in the opening of Japan. Mustin's great-uncle, LT Arthur Sinclair, fought in CSS Virginia during the Battle of Hampton Roads and in CSS Alabama during her sinking in the Battle of Cherbourg. His maternal uncle was General George Barnett, 12th Commandant of the United States Marine Corps, for whom the attack transport USS Barnett (APA-5) was named.

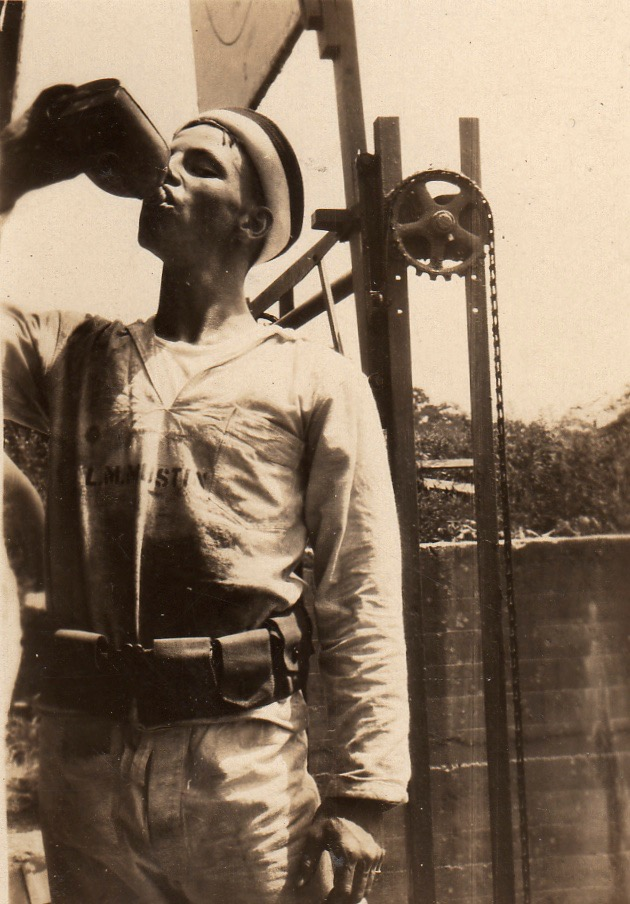
Midshipman Lloyd M. Mustin, 1928

Mustin entered the United States Naval Academy in 1928 and graduated in 1932. His academy classmates included Richard Best, Bruce McCandless, and Henry Munson. After graduation, he was assigned to the cruiser Augusta (CA-31). She was commanded in Mustin's time by three future four-star admirals, among them Captain Chester W. Nimitz. He carried Nimitz's lessons with him throughout the remainder of his career.

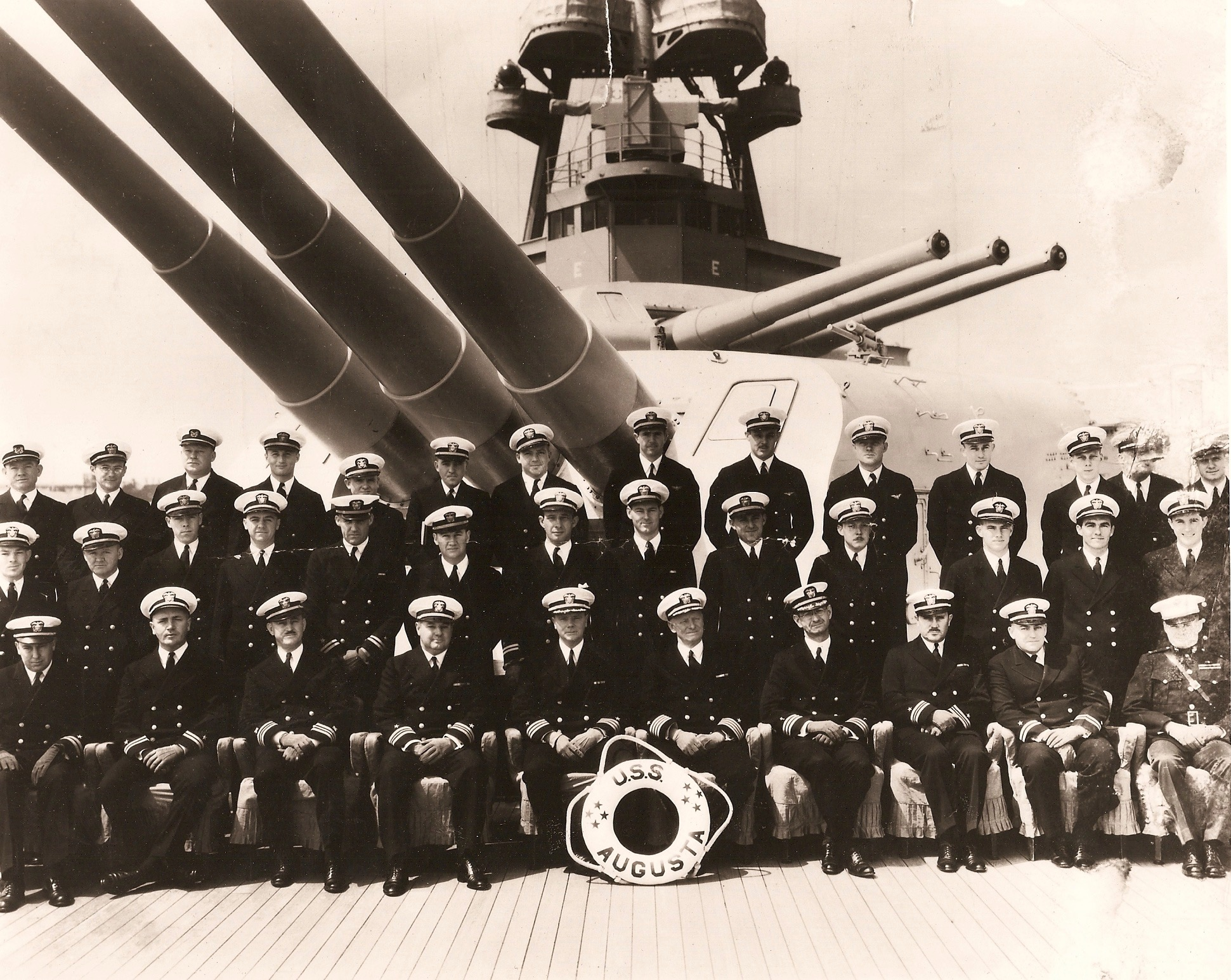
Augusta Wardroom. Mustin is Second Row, 3rd from Right

After four years he was transferred to the destroyer Lamson (DD 367), in which he served two years. After instruction in ordnance engineering at the Naval Postgraduate School and the Massachusetts Institute of Technology (MS 1940) he became assistant production officer at the Naval Gun Factory, Washington, D.C., and took part in developing the Mark 14 gunsight.

At the outbreak of World War II, Mustin was assistant gunnery officer in the cruiser Atlanta (CL 51) and was aboard when she was sunk during the Battle for Guadalcanal on the night of 13 November 1942. He survived the sinking and landed on Guadalcanal with survivors and served there for three months with the small naval unit attached to the First Marine Division For his three-month service at Guadalcanal, Mustin was decorated with the Navy Commendation Medal with Combat "V".

In 1943–1944 he had consecutive duty in the cruisers San Diego (CL 53) and Miami (CL 89). For outstanding service in the latter he received a second Navy Commendation Medal. He next served as gunnery, radar, and CIC officer on the staff of Commander Battleship Squadron Two, Vice Admiral Willis A. Lee Jr., USN, and in the summer of 1945 was with Admiral Lee in establishing the Operational Development Force, as gunnery, radar, and CIC officer.

== Postwar service ==
After the war, Mustin was ordered to the Navy Department, Washington, D.C., for duty as head of the Fire Control Branch, Research Division, Bureau of Ordnance. This duty was followed by service afloat in command of the destroyer USS Keppler (DD-765) and later as ASW officer and readiness officer on the Staff of Commander Destroyer Force, Atlantic. Between 1951 and 1954 he was assigned to the Weapons System Evaluation Group, Office of the Secretary of Defense, and after command of the destroyer tender Piedmont (AD 17), had command of Cruiser-Destroyer Force, Pacific, from April 1957 until May 1958, when he reported as commander of Destroyer Flotilla Two.

While so serving he had additional duty from May to October 1958, in command of Task Force 88, a special task force organized to plan and conduct the Argus high-altitude nuclear tests which were fired in a remote part of the South Atlantic. In October 1958 he assumed additional duty in command of Antisubmarine Defense Group "Charlie", and from February through April 1959 commanded Task force 88 conducting combined ASW training operations with the navies and air forces of the countries on the west coast of South America.

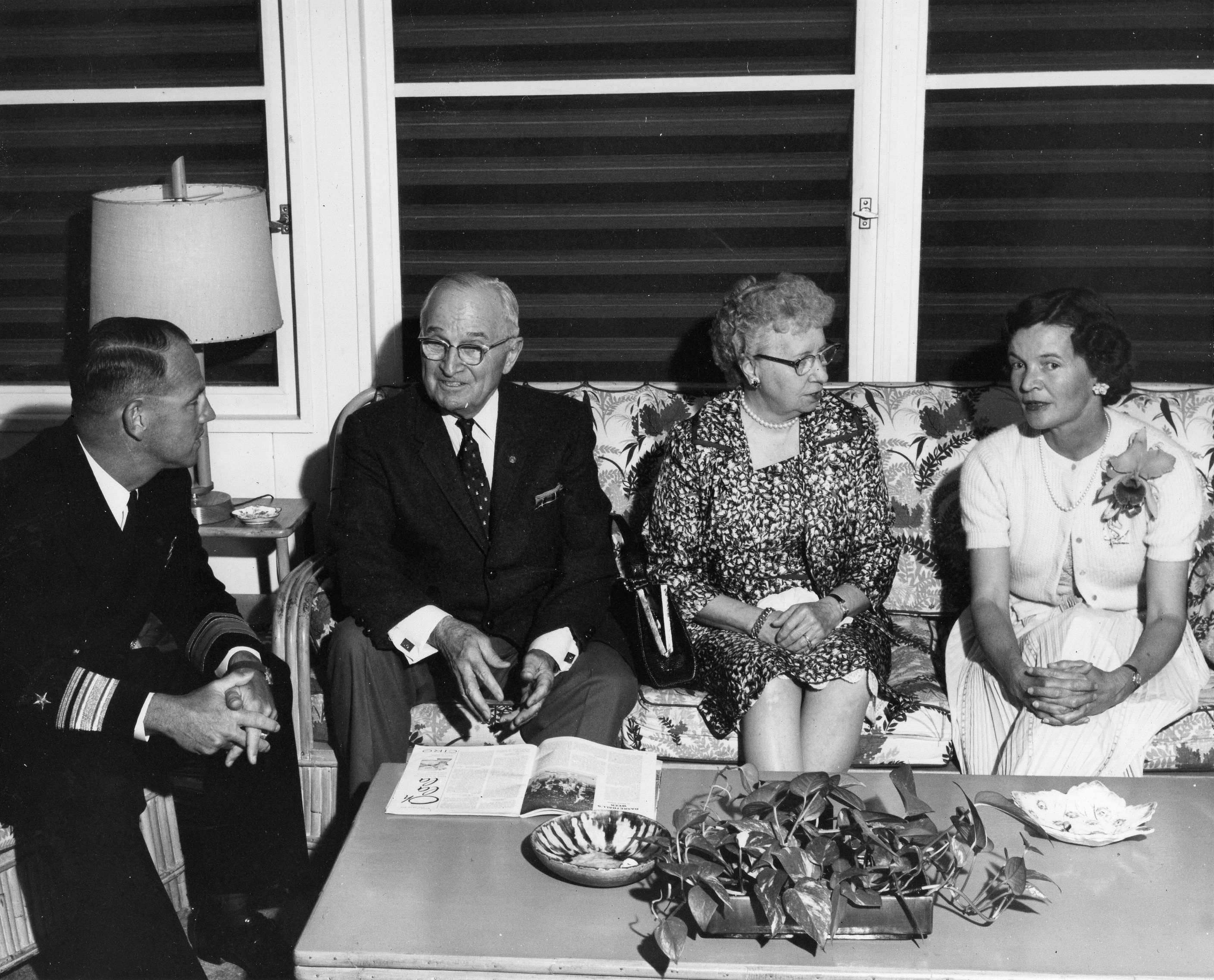
RADM and Mrs. Mustin host President and Mrs. Truman at the Little White House in Key West, FL.

On 13 June 1959, he became commander of Naval Base, Key West, and commander of Key West Force and in May 1960 reported for duty in the Office of the Chief of Naval Operations, first as antisubmarine readiness executive and then as director of antisubmarine warfare.

On 30 November 1961, he reported to Joint Task Force Eight as deputy task force commander and commander of Joint Task Group 8.3, to plan and conduct the Dominic series of nuclear tests in the Pacific. On 2 November 1962, he was designated commander of Joint Task Force Eight, to conduct the remaining Dominic tests and to plan for and conduct future nuclear tests.

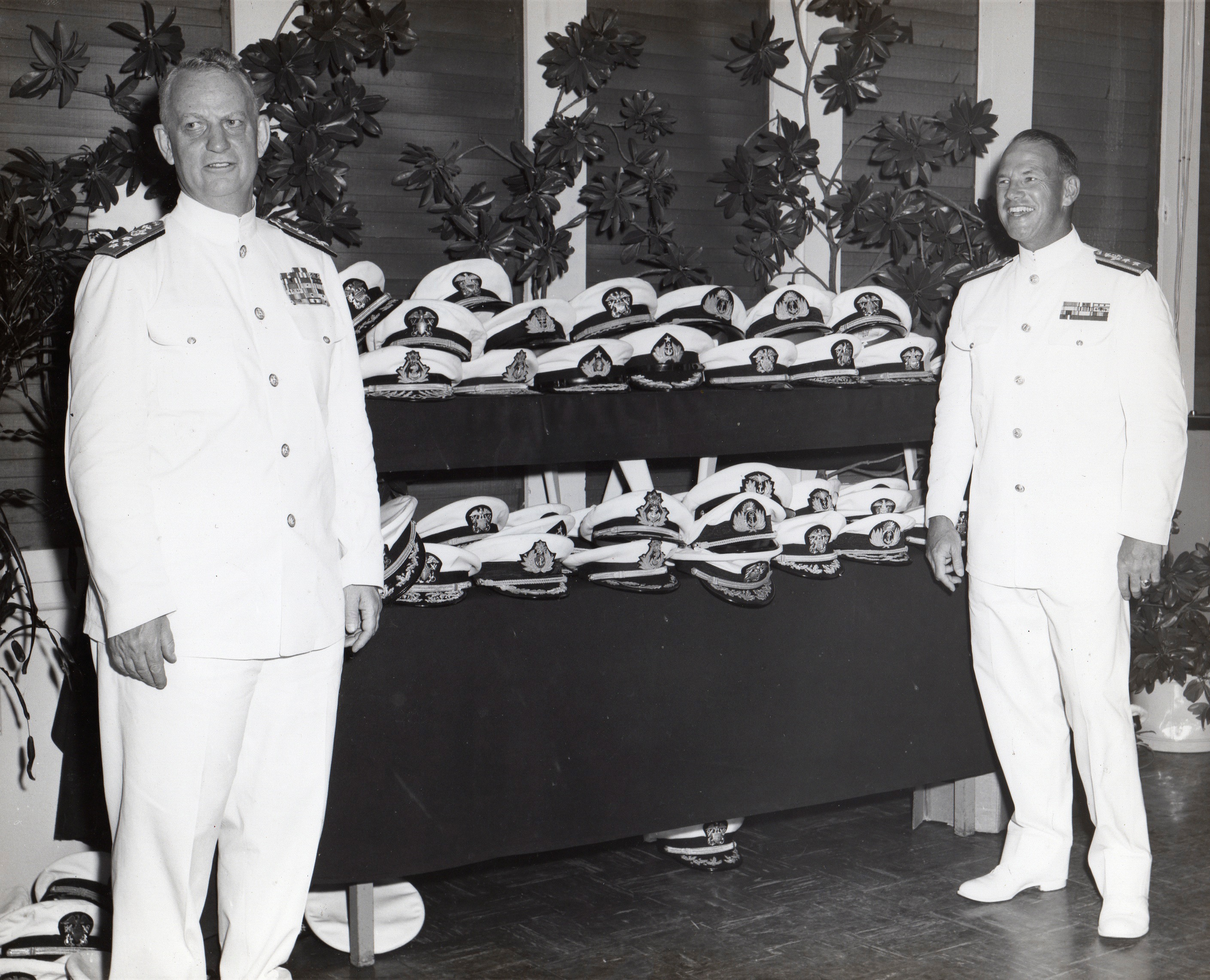
ADM Arleigh A. Burke, USN, Chief of Naval Operations and RADM Mustin, USN, hosting a reception for the Inter-American Naval Conference.

On 1 June 1964, he became director for operations of J-3, Joint Staff, Joint Chiefs of Staff, Washington, D.C. In May 1967 he became commander of Amphibious Force, US Atlantic Fleet and in July 1968 assumed duty as director of the Defense Atomic Support Agency, Washington, D.C. He served in that capacity until relieved of active duty pending his retirement, effective 1 August 1971.

== Post-Retirement ==
Following his retirement from the Navy, Mustin was a member of the U.S. Olympic Committee for shooting sports and served as president of the National Rifle Association of America 1977–1979. Beside that, he was active in the Coronado Community Church and enjoyed deep-sea fishing. On his 80th Birthday, he caught a 300-pound Marlin at Cabo San Lucas, Mexico.

Vice admiral Lloyd M. Mustin died on January 21, 1999, aged 87, at his home in Coronado, California. He was buried beside his wife, Emily Morton Mustin (1914-1989), at United States Naval Academy Cemetery at Annapolis, Maryland. They had together two sons: Hank, who also served in the Navy and retired as Vice admiral and Thomas, who retired as Lieutenant Commander in the Navy.

== Promotions ==
- Midshipman – 14 June 1928
- Ensign – 2 June 1932
- Lieutenant (junior grade) – 2 June 1935
- Lieutenant – 1 July 1939
- Lieutenant commander – 15 June 1942
- Commander – 1 November 1943 to date from 18 November 1942
- Captain – 1 January 1951
- Rear admiral – 1 July 1958
- Vice admiral – 21 August 1964

== Decorations ==
Here is the ribbon bar of Vice admiral Mustin:

1st Row	Navy Distinguished Service Medal with one 5/16" Gold Star		
2nd Row	Legion of Merit with one 5/16" Gold Star	Navy Commendation Medal with Combat "V" and one 5/16" Gold Star	Navy Presidential Unit Citation with two stars
3rd Row	American Defense Service Medal	American Campaign Medal	Asiatic–Pacific Campaign Medal with twelve 3/16 inch bronze service stars and FMF Combat Operation Insignia
4th Row	World War II Victory Medal	China Service Medal	National Defense Service Medal with one star
5th Row	Philippine Liberation Medal with two service stars	Philippine Republic Presidential Unit Citation	Order of Naval Merit, rank Officer (Peru)
6th Row	Grand Star of Military Merit, (Republic of Chile)	Rifle Marksmanship Ribbon	Pistol Marksmanship Ribbon

== Commemoration ==
The U.S. Navy guided-missile destroyer USS Mustin (DDG-89) is named for the Mustin family, which includes many notable navy officers.

== See also ==
- Mustin's father, pioneer US navy aviator Henry C. Mustin (1874-1923)
- Mustin's son US Vice Admiral Henry C. Mustin (1933-2016)

National Rifle Association of America
Preceded by Merrill W. Wright	President of the NRA; 1977-1979	Succeeded by John B. Layton
