= Arthur Sinclair =

United States Navy officer (1780–1831)

Arthur Sinclair II
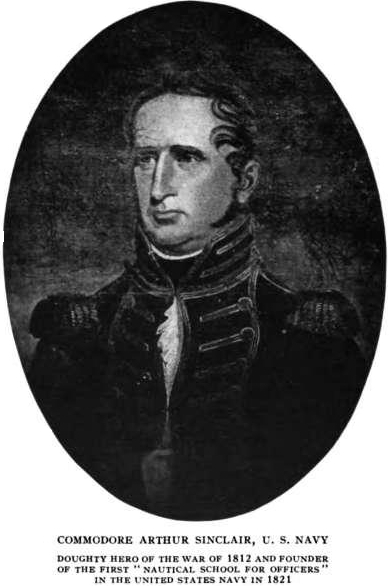
- Born: February 28, 1780; Mecklenburg, Virginia, U.S.
- Died: February 7, 1831 (aged 50); Norfolk, Virginia, U.S.
- Relatives: Upton Sinclair, Mustin family
- Military career
- Branch: United States Navy
- Service years: 1796 - 1831
- Rank: Commodore
- Units: USS Constellation; USS Essex
- Commands: USS Argus; USS General Pike; USS Niagara; USS Congress; USS Washington; Norfolk Navy Yard
- Conflicts: Quasi-War; First Barbary War; War of 1812
- Awards: Presented an engraved sword from the Commonwealth of Virginia for valorous engagements on Lake Erie during the War of 1812

Commodore Arthur Sinclair (28 February 1780 – 7 February 1831) was a United States Navy officer who served in during the Quasi-War, the First Barbary War and the War of 1812. His three sons also served in the Navy; they resigned in 1861, however, to serve in the Confederate States Navy.

== Early Naval Service ==
Born in Virginia, the youngest son of Arthur Sinclair I who had served in the Royal Navy during the War of Jenkins' Ear and the Continental Navy during the American Revolution, Sinclair entered the Navy as Midshipman in 1798. He served as Midshipman in Constellation during the capture of the French frigate L'Insurgente on 9 February 1799. He was attached to the Mediterranean Squadron from June 1804 to July 1806, participating in the attacks on Tripoli on board Essex. He then sailed Gunboat No. 10 to the United States.

== War of 1812 ==
For much of the War of 1812, Sinclair was assigned to the Great Lakes as part of Commodore Isaac Chauncey's squadron, where he commanded the warship General Pike in an engagement on Lake Ontario on 28 September 1813. For his valor during another engagement on Lake Erie in 1813, Sinclair received a presentation sword from the Commonwealth of Virginia (now in the Virginia Historical Society's collection). In 1814, he commanded Niagara on Lake Huron and Lake Superior and directed the naval squadron in the Battle of Mackinac Island and the Engagement on Lake Huron. Sinclair conducted a hit-and-run raid at St. Mary River, Upper Canada capturing a small merchantman, the Mink. After capturing the merchantman in the raid, Arthur Sinclair withdrew back to American lines in Michilimackinac. In extension of his raid at St. Mary River. Sinclair sent Turner with a detachment of seamen alongside regulars under Andrew Holmes to penetrate deeper into enemy territory. Turner destroyed buildings, possessions, and burned a schooner. Turner withdrew back to American territory in Michilimackinac reuniting with Arthur Sinclair.

Promoted to Captain in 1813, he commanded the frigate Congress in 1817; commanded the 74-gun ship of the line Washington in 1818. In 1819, he rose to the rank of Commodore and was placed in command of the Norfolk Navy Yard. It was while there, that he conceived the idea of a Nautical School and was allowed to set one up on board the frigate Guerriere, for the education and development of young naval officers. It was from that small start that the current U.S. Naval Academy at Annapolis has grown.

== Promotion ==
Promoted to Captain in 1813, he commanded the frigate Congress in 1817; commanded the 74-gun ship of the line Washington in 1818. In 1819, he rose to the rank of Commodore and was placed in command of the Norfolk Navy Yard. It was while there, that he conceived the idea of a Nautical School and was allowed to set one up on board the frigate Guerriere, for the education and development of young naval officers. It was from that small start that the current U.S. Naval Academy at Annapolis has grown.

Commodore Sinclair died at Norfolk, Virginia on 7 February 1831.

== Family ==
The family originated from the Shetland Islands off Scotland and were reputedly distant relations of Scottish royalty. The first Arthur Sinclair, of Scalloway, in Shetland, sailed with Commodore George Anson in 1740, on a mission to capture Spanish possessions in the Pacific, during the War of Jenkin's Ear. The mission lasted for four years and resulted in the little fleet circumnavigating the world. Loss of life was horrendous, with only 188 of the original 1,854 men surviving to make it back to England.

Arthur Sinclair I left the expedition when they reached America and eventually settled in Norfolk, Virginia, where he made claim to a large tract of land, and became a sea captain sailing between Virginia and England. After the death of his first wife he married Susanna Phillips of Halifax County, in Middlesex County on 22 February 1766 at the age of 59. Their son, Arthur II, was born in 1780. During the War of American Independence (1775-1783) Sinclair served in the Continental Navy, fighting against his old countrymen. He retired to Cobham in Surry County where he died in 1791 at age 84.

Arthur Sinclair II married first, Elizabeth, daughter of General John Hartwell Cocke, of Mt Pleasant, in Surry County. They had two children, twins, Robert Carter Nicholas d 1806 and Augusta (died 3 weeks after birth) Mar 1802. These children died young and their mother died in 1803.

Arthur Sinclair II married second on 20 Jan 1810 in Halifax County, Sarah (Sally) Short Skipwith Kennon (30 Oct 1790 - 21 August 1827), daughter of Colonel Richard Kennon of Conjurer's Neck, Chesterfield County.

Arthur and Sally had seven children:

1. Arthur Sinclair (29 Nov 1810 - 14 Jan 1865), Commander USN, CSN, served on the CSS Alabama, married, 20 Apr 1835, Lelia Imogene Dawley of Norfolk.

2. Elizabeth Beverly Sinclair Whittle (26 Jul 1812 - 1855), married Captain William Conway Whittle, USN, CSN

3. Richard Kennon Sinclair (8 Nov 1814-7 Jul 1815)

4. George Tarry Sinclair (29 Sep 1816 - 25 Jul 1885) LT USN, CSN 2 May 1843, Mary Thompson (5 Jan 1825 - 6 Nov 1888)

5. Dr. William Beverly Sinclair (22 Jan 1818 - 27 Sep 1895), surgeon, USN, CSN, a prominent physician, married 11 Nov 1844, Lucy Franklin Read Jones

6. Sarah Sinclair (22 Jul 1820), died in infancy

7. Gilberta Fayette Sinclair (19 Oct 1824 - 27 Apr 1906), married Dr. Conway Davies Whittle, of Norfolk.

Arthur Sinclair II was the great-grandfather of novelist Upton Sinclair, author of the novel The Jungle (1906). He was also the second great-grandfather of Vice Admiral Lloyd M. Mustin and third great-grandfather of Vice Admiral Henry C. "Hank" Mustin and the fourth great-grandfather of Vice Admiral John Mustin.

== Namesake ==
The destroyer USS Sinclair (DD-275) was named for him.
