= Henry G. Munson =

United States Navy officer (1909–1975)

Henry Glass Munson
- Born: December 31, 1909; Manila, Philippines
- Died: July 16, 1975 (aged 65)
- Military career
- Allegiance: United States
- Branch: United States Navy
- Service years: 1927–1959
- Rank: Captain
- Conflicts: World War II: Pacific War; Korean War

Henry Glass Munson (1909–1975) was an officer in the United States Navy during the Second World War and Korean War. He served with distinction during wartime and played a critical role in the development of submarine warfare.

Munson enlisted in the Navy in 1927. He was accepted into the US Naval Academy the next year, from where he graduated in 1932. His classmates included Richard Best, Bruce McCandless, and Lloyd Mustin. He served on surface ships until entering submarine school in 1936. During World War II, Munson commanded several submarines, including the USS Crevalle (SS-291), the USS S-38 (SS-143), and the USS Rasher (SS-269). In the course of a single day under his command, the lattermost submarine sank Japanese ships totaling an estimated 55,723 tons. The cruise sank the tenth most enemy ships of any submarine mission in the war.

Following the war, he became a leader in submarine warfare research and development. According to Naval documents, in November, 1946, "he supervised the first actual guided missile firings from submarines" as the commander of Submarine Division 71. He headed the group that developed the Mark 45 torpedo, planned and oversaw Operation Sandblast, the first submerged circumnavigation of the world, and directed the investigation into the loss of the USS Thresher (SSN-593).

In addition to the Navy Cross with two Gold Stars in lieu of additional awards, the Commendation Ribbon with two stars and Combat "V," the Presidential Unit Citation Ribbon and the Navy Commendation Ribbon, Captain Munson has the American Defense Service Medal with star; Asiatic-Pacific Campaign Medal with two operation stars; American Campaign Medal; World War II Victory Medal; China Service Medal (extended); National Defense Service Medal; Korean Service Medal; and United Nations Service Medal.

Captain Munson married the former Anna M. Olsen of Waukegan, Illinois in Honolulu in 1939. Munson retired from the Navy in 1959, after which he served as senior research associate for the David Sarnoff Research Center. A third and last career found him teaching advanced physics at Princeton High School. Following his death on July 16, 1975, Captain Munson and Anna's remains were interred in the Pacific Ocean west of Kauai on February 6, 2002.[4]
