= USS Sinclair =

Clemson-class destroyer

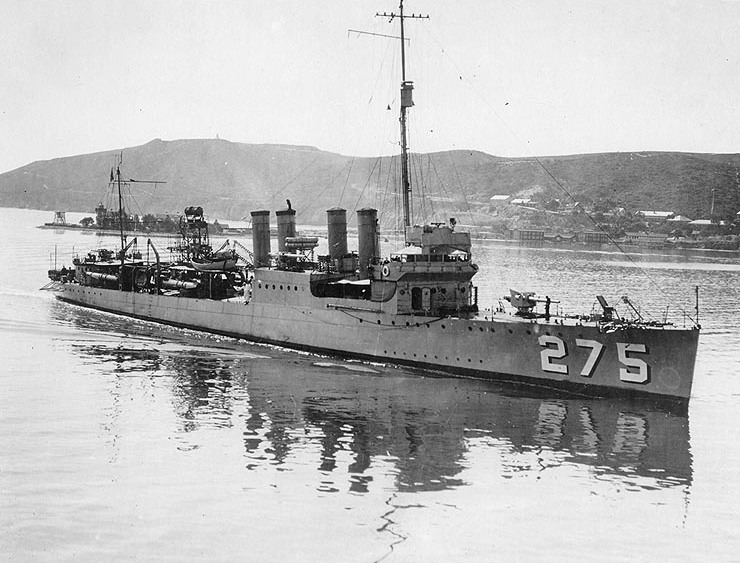

History

United States
- Namesake: Arthur Sinclair
- Builder: Bethlehem Shipbuilding Corporation, Squantum Victory Yard
- Laid down: 15 October 1918
- Launched: 2 June 1919
- Commissioned: 8 October 1919
- Decommissioned: 1 June 1929
- Stricken: 5 June 1935
- Fate: Sold for scrap, 30 August 1935

General characteristics
- Class & type: Clemson-class destroyer
- Displacement: 1,215 tons
- Length: 314 feet 4 1/2 inches (95.822 m)
- Beam: 30 feet 11 1/2 inches (9.436 m)
- Draft: 9 ft 4 in (2.84 m)
- Propulsion: 26,500 shp (20 MW); geared turbines, 2 screws
- Speed: 35 knots (65 km/h)
- Range: 4,900 nmi (9,100 km); @ 15 kt
- Complement: 122 officers and enlisted
- Armament: 4 × 4 in (102 mm)/50 guns, 1 × 3 in (76 mm)/25 gun, 12 × 21 inch (533 mm) torpedo tubes

USS Sinclair (DD-275) was a Clemson-class destroyer in the United States Navy. She was named for Captain Arthur Sinclair.

== History ==
Sinclair was laid down on 15 October 1918 by the Bethlehem Shipbuilding Corporation, Squantum, Massachusetts; launched on 2 June 1919; sponsored by Mrs. George Barnett, great-granddaughter of Capt. Sinclair; and commissioned on 8 October 1919.

After shakedown, Sinclair departed Newport, Rhode Island on 17 January 1920 for the Caribbean. Between 7 and 25 February 1920, she patrolled off the coasts of Honduras and Guatemala during political unrest in those countries. From 13 to 18 March, she assisted in efforts to salvage the submarine, H-l, aground off Santa Margarita Island, California. She then joined the Pacific Fleet for operations off San Diego, California.

On 9 July 1920, Sinclair embarked the Secretary of the Navy and Commander in Chief, United States Pacific Fleet, at Seattle, Washington, and carried them on a tour of ports in Alaska and British Columbia. The Secretary of the Navy transferred to Idaho (BB-42) on 18 July, and the Commander in Chief to New Mexico (BB-40) upon returning to Puget Sound on 12 August. Sinclair then resumed operations off San Diego until decommissioned and placed in reserve there on 25 May 1920.

On 27 September 1923, Sinclair was recommissioned as a replacement for one of the seven destroyers wrecked on Point Honda on 8 September 1923. After shakedown at San Diego, she sailed south with the Battle Fleet in January 1924, transited the Panama Canal on the 17th, and participated in exercises during the fleet concentration in the Caribbean from 25 January to 5 April. After returning to San Diego on 22 April, she underwent overhaul at Puget Sound from 3 May to 13 June and, after a brief visit to San Diego, rejoined the fleet in the Puget Sound area for a summer exercise. She operated at San Diego from 1 October 1924 to 3 April 1925, was overhauled at Puget Sound from 12 April to 19 June, and rejoined the fleet at Pearl Harbor on 27 June.

On 1 July 1925, Sinclair sailed from Hawaii with the Battle Fleet on a goodwill visit to the Southwest Pacific, and visited Melbourne, Australia; Auckland and Wellington, New Zealand; and American Samoa before returning to San Diego on 26 September. She departed San Diego on 1 February 1926 for fleet exercises off the Canal Zone, returning on 6 March. From 15 March to 30 April, she received repairs at Bremerton; and, on 21 June, departed San Diego with the Battle Fleet for summer exercises off Puget Sound, which lasted until 1 September.

Again departing San Diego with the Battle Fleet on 17 February 1927, Sinclair transited the Panama Canal on 4 March and participated in exercises in the Caribbean until 13 April. On 24 April, she returned to San Diego and then proceeded to Bremerton, Washington for repairs which lasted from 4 May to 28 June 1927. She spent the summer training reserves in the Puget Sound area and returned to San Diego on 9 September.

Sinclair underwent overhaul at Puget Sound from 26 March to 9 May 1928 and rejoined the fleet at Pearl Harbor on 16 May for exercises. Returning to San Diego on 23 June, she sailed on 5 July for summer exercises in the north, lasting to 18 August. From 1 September 1928 to 15 January 1929, she operated off San Diego; and, from 27 January to 21 February, she participated in Fleet Problem IX off Panama. She commenced overhaul at Puget Sound on 17 March 1929 but was ordered decommissioned instead. After returning to San Diego on 8 April 1929, she was decommissioned there on 1 June 1929.

== Fate ==
On 22 November 1930, Sinclair was renamed Light Target (IX-37). Due to faulty boilers, however, her conversion to a target ship was cancelled, and she was replaced by Kilty (DD-137). She recovered her original name on 24 April 1931 and her destroyer designation on 11 August 1931.

Sinclair was struck from the Navy list on 5 June 1935 and sold on 30 August 1935 to Learner and Rosenthal, Oakland, California, for scrapping.

As of 2005, no other ship have been named Sinclair.
