= Henry C. Mustin (1933–2016) =

U.S. Navy vice admiral

Henry Croskey Mustin
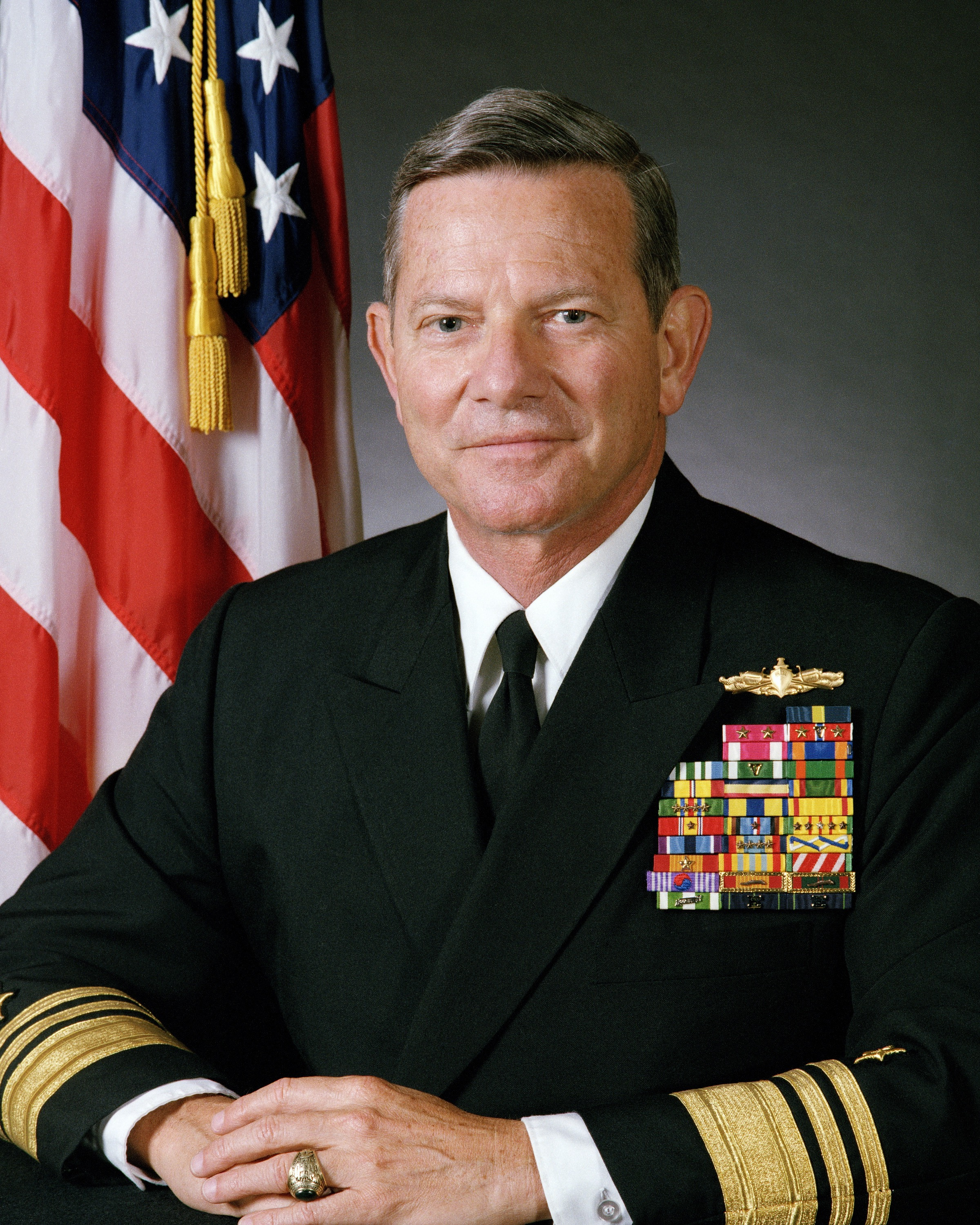
- VADM Henry C. Mustin
- Born: August 31, 1933; Bremerton, Washington, U.S.
- Died: April 11, 2016 (aged 82); Suffolk, Virginia, U.S.
- Burial place: United States Naval Academy, Annapolis, Maryland
- Spouse: Lucy Holcomb
- Military career
- Allegiance: United States of America
- Branch: United States Navy
- Service years: 1955–1989
- Rank: Vice admiral
- Nickname: "Hammerin' Hank"
- Commands: USS Bunting (MHC-45); USS Henry B. Wilson (DDG-7); Commander, Destroyer Squadron 12; Commander, Cruiser Destroyer Group 2; Commander, U.S. Second Fleet; Commander, NATO Striking Fleet Atlantic
- Conflicts: Vietnam War; Cold War
- Awards: Navy Distinguished Service Medal; Legion of Merit; Bronze Star with Combat "V" (3)

Henry "Hank" Croskey Mustin (August 31, 1933 – April 11, 2016) was a vice admiral in the United States Navy and among the namesakes of USS Mustin (DDG-89). He distinguished himself during both the Vietnam and Cold Wars. As a flag officer he commanded Cruiser Destroyer Group 2, US Second Fleet, NATO Striking Fleet Atlantic, and Joint Task Force 120, where he was responsible for 225 ships and 2,100 aircraft spanning over 45 million square miles from the Arctic Circle to the Equator. Vice Admiral Mustin directed US Navy arms control planning, including the START negotiations with the Soviet Union. He led high-level US interagency delegations to Moscow, London, Paris, Lisbon, Oslo and Seoul. As Commander, NATO Striking Fleet Atlantic, he instituted major strategic changes to the defense of NATO that shaped the nation's maritime strategy. He also served as the senior US military representative to the United Nations. He retired from the navy on January 1, 1989, after nearly 34 years of active duty service.

== Early life and education ==
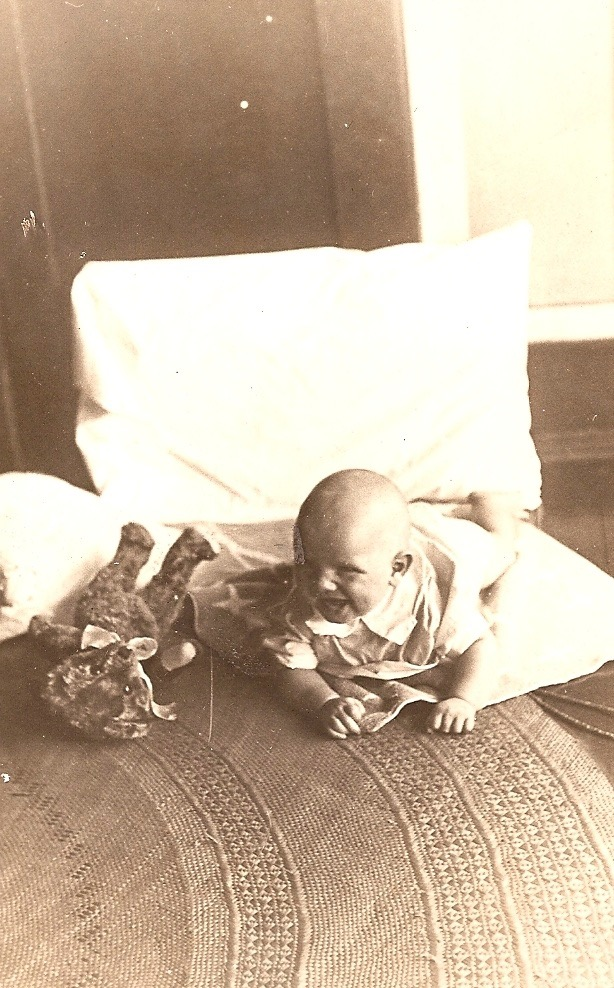
Henry C. Mustin, Bremerton, Washington, 1934

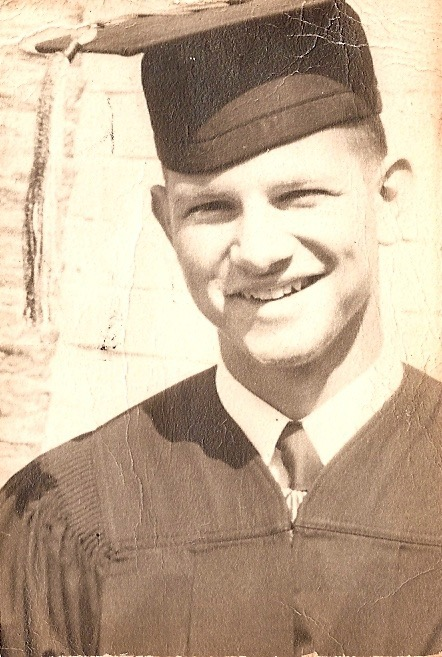
High school graduation

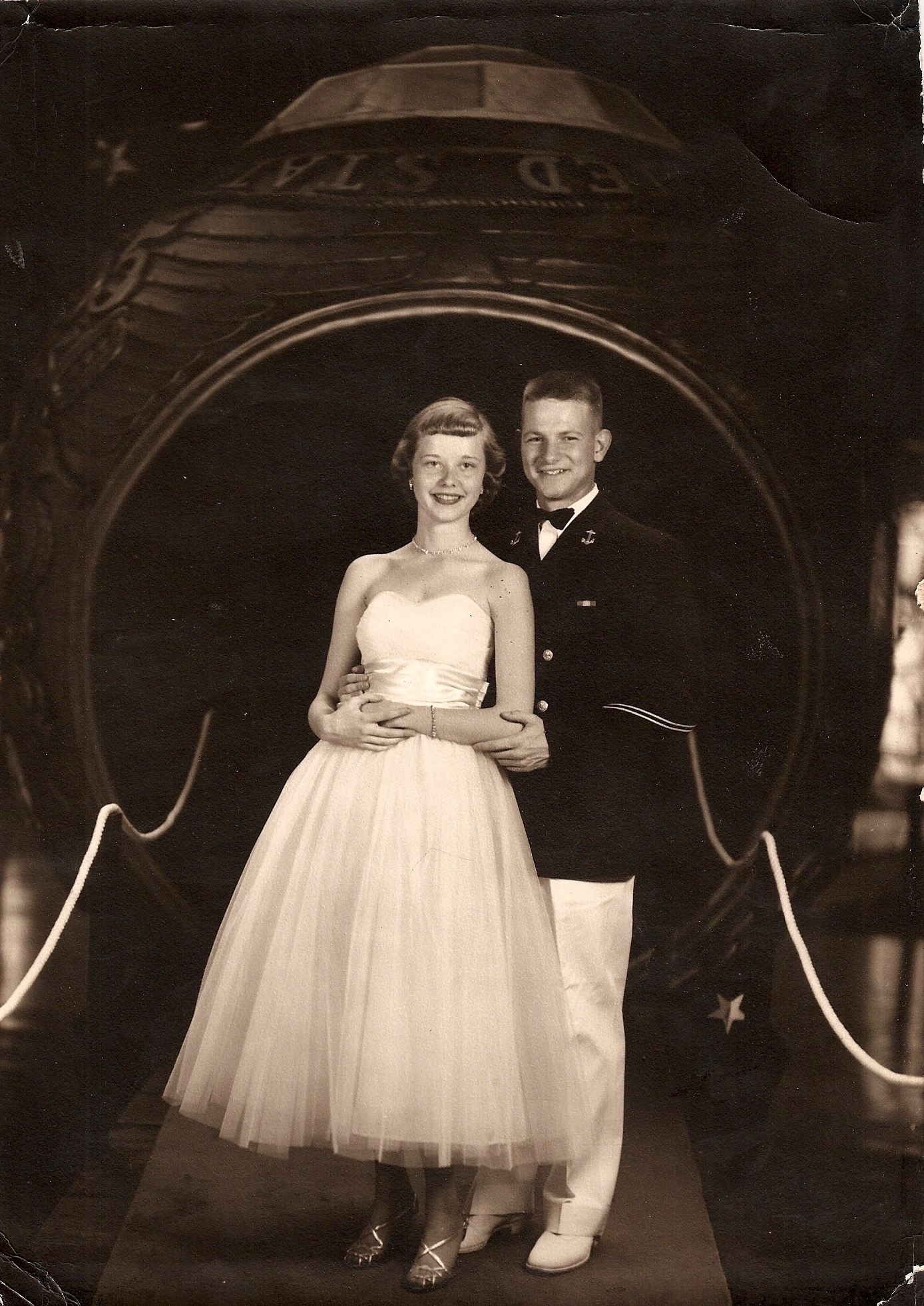
Midshipman 2/C Henry C. Mustin and Lucy H. Mustin

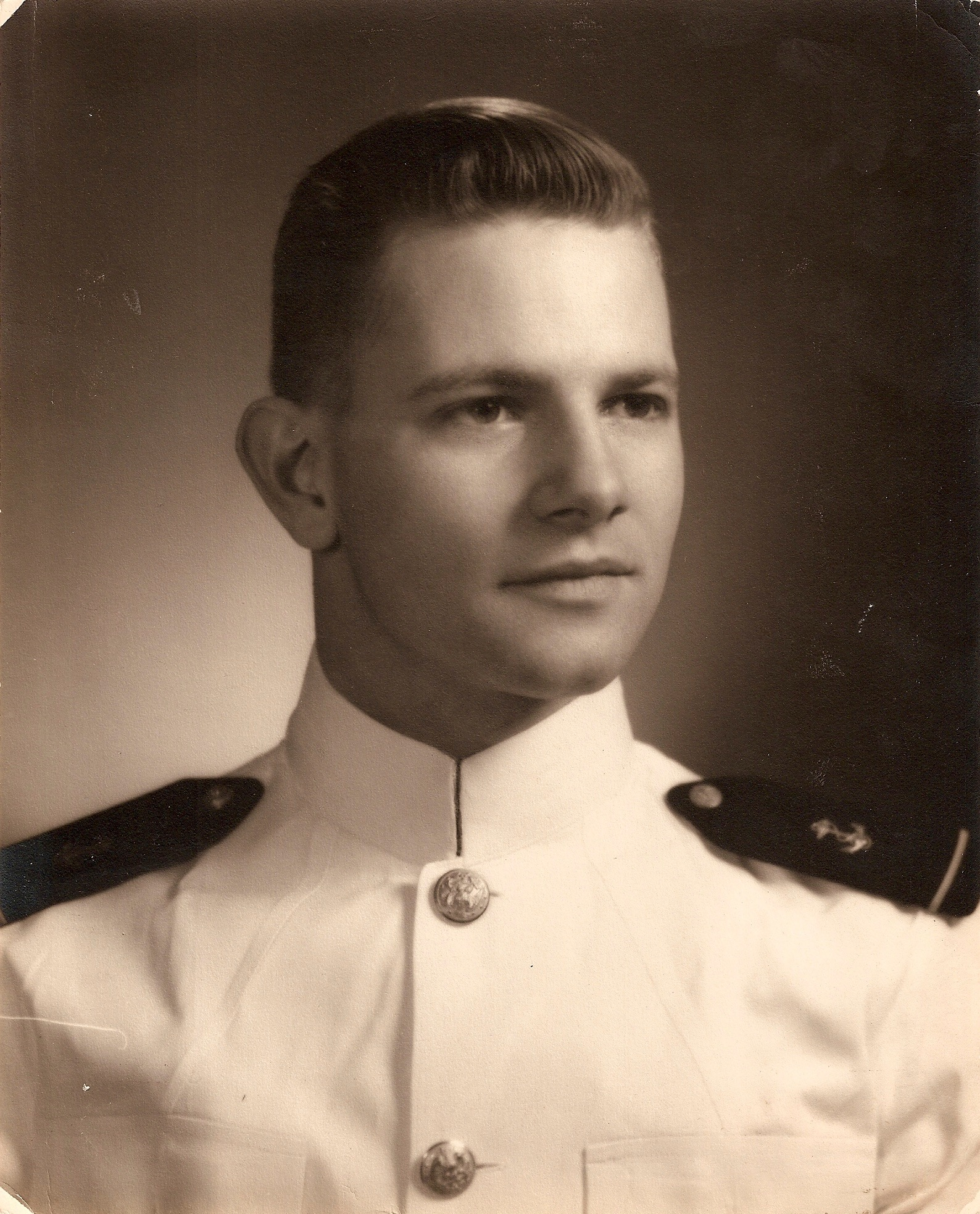
Midshipman 1/C Henry C. Mustin, 1955

A Navy junior, Mustin was born in Bremerton, Washington, on 31 August 1933, as the sixth generation of distinguished naval officers and great-nephew of George Barnett, the 12th Commandant of the Marine Corps. He was the son of Vice Admiral Lloyd Montague Mustin and Emily Proctor Mustin, and namesake of his late grandfather Captain Henry C. Mustin a pioneering naval aviator. Of her eldest son, Henry Croskey Mustin, Emily would often say that he "was born with his feet planted firmly on the ground." In the late 1940s, while attending St. Stephen's School in Alexandria, VA, he acquired the nickname Hank, as if to reinforce a rootedness, despite his many moves as a Navy junior.

Mustin remained at St. Stephen's through his sophomore year of high school. As a tenth grader, he was captain of the football and baseball teams. The high scorer on the basketball team and the player with the highest batting average on the baseball team, he won both the teams' cups as outstanding player, as well as the cup for the school's outstanding athlete. In the late summer of 1948, Mustin moved to Coronado, CA when his father received orders to command his first ship. Mustin's grandmother, Corinne, and her second husband, Admiral George D. Murray, would frequently visit North Island to visit the Mustins and their friends. They would often throw grand cocktail parties at the air station's flag cabin, and Mustin would often find himself in the presence of such Navy notables as Halsey and Nimitz. He recalled that "the events of the war were fresh in these guys' minds. They would be talking over what now are the famous battles of World War II, and they'd be saying 'Well, so-and-so was nervous and abandoned his ship too early.' They talked the way we do about guys that are the giants of history. All that stuff had a great influence on me." As a youngster Mustin admired and respected his father and his friends. There was never any doubt in his mind that he wanted to join the navy and be like them.

Mustin's determination to attend the U.S. Naval Academy was unshakeable. He graduated from Coronado High School, Coronado, California, in 1950, but not yet seventeen, he was too young for admission to the Naval Academy. At the time, neither his father nor his mother wanted him to do a year at a West Coast university fearing the effect on his resolve, so the decision was made for him to enter the University of Virginia prior to competing for a slot at the Naval Academy. Upon completion of his first year at UVA, Mustin was selected for a SECNAV appointment to the Naval Academy joining the class of 1955. During Christmas leave in 1953, his Third Class year, Mustin met Lucy Holcomb. During the Holiday, Lucy's brother Russ got four tickets to a Harlem Globetrotters game and proposed that they take each other's sisters. After going to that game, Mustin never dated anyone else. In 1954, during his Second Class year, he proposed at the Ring Dance and they became engaged. They were married later the next year.

At the time, the officers who were prestigious, were destroyer sailors and which was the assignment Mustin also wanted. On service selection night, he drew a number high enough to let him pick USS Duncan (DD-874), a San Diego–based Gearing-class destroyer.

== Early career ==
=== USS Duncan (DD-874) ===
In those days, each destroyer division had four destroyers: one long-hull radar picket destroyer, a straight stick, long-hull destroyer, and two Fletcher-class 445s. Two divisions made a squadron. Pacific destroyers primarily were serving as escorts, screening the carrier battle groups in the strike force, Task Force 77.

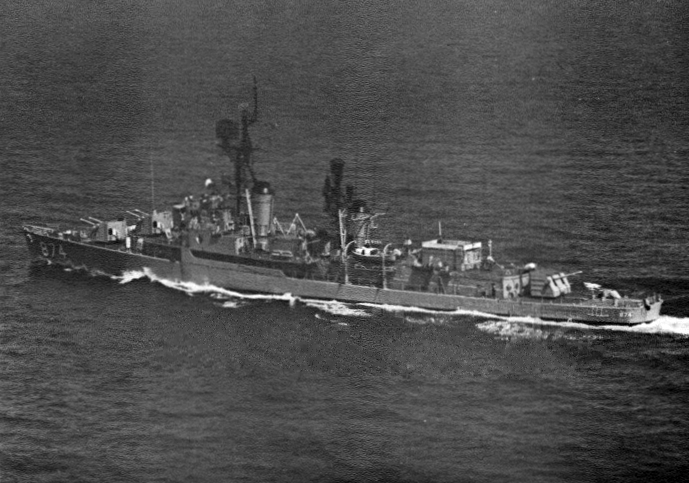
USS Duncan (DD-874)

Mustin was fortunate to be in the Duncan, the division's radar picket destroyer (DDR). Before the Fleet Rehabilitation and Modernization Program, which added substantial anti-submarine warfare capability to World War II destroyers, a DDR was a coveted ship, and the Duncan had one of the earliest three-dimensional radars, the SPS-8. Though he preferred the Gunnery Department, Mustin's commanding officer, Commander Ed Conrad, assigned him to serve as the fifth officer in Engineering Department, an assignment which inspired many follow-on tours in engineering.

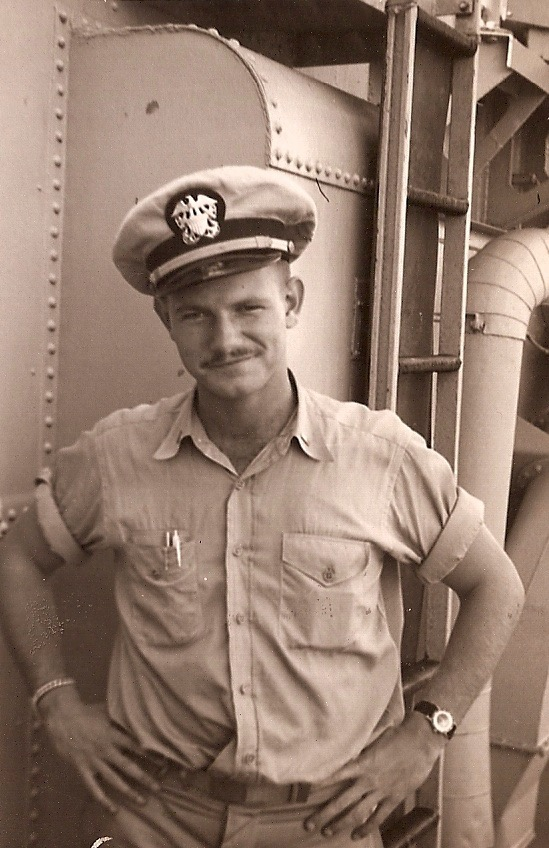
ENS Mustin aboard USS Duncan (DD-874)

The Korean War had been over for two years. The front-line mission of the Pacific Fleet was now patrolling the Taiwan Strait and protecting Nationalist China. Among Mustin's other duties was watch standing, which on the Duncan came with surprises that revealed the lax state of morale in some quarters of the navy of the mid-fifties. One night, a week into his first Pacific crossing, the ship was steaming in close formation, and Mustin was on the bridge during the mid-watch. The officer of the deck turned to him and said "Okay, kid, you've got it." With that, he eased himself into the captain's chair and went to sleep. Mustin was conning the ship. Shortly thereafter, he had to give his first rudder command. He turned to the helm and to his horror saw no helmsman and no helm. Several seconds later, the sailor bounded into the pilothouse with the wheel. Unbeknownst to Mustin, the bridge watch played a game in which the helmsman would unscrew the helm from its mounting and run from his station onto the starboard wing of the bridge, around the pilothouse past the signalman's station aft, and enter from the port wing back to his station. His object was to return in time to reattach the helm and answer orders before the officer of the deck tried to maneuver the ship.

Following two weeks of exercises in Hawaiian waters, the Duncan arrived in Yokosuka on 30 August 1955. While in Japan those officers on the Duncan whose service obligation ended with the Korean War went home. The ship went from twenty-two officers to eleven. Mustin found himself now the second officer in the Engineering Department. In the meantime, Mustin also was continuing to learn. Later the next year while in San Diego, the chief engineer left, leaving him as department head. He came to rely heavily on a Chief Blazewski, a thirty-two-year veteran who "had a row of hash marks that were running up his arm." He took Mustin under his wing, and trained him to ensure that they could run the department without too much meddling from above. Blazewski's style illustrated how the chief petty officers could hold a ship together, Mustin observed. "You had this wardroom all of a sudden losing all of the experienced officers with very junior officer replacements, like me. And this sort of half-mutinous gang of draftees and other guys who couldn't wait to get out. It was a difficult time, and the chiefs made it all work."

=== USS Bunting (MHC-45) ===
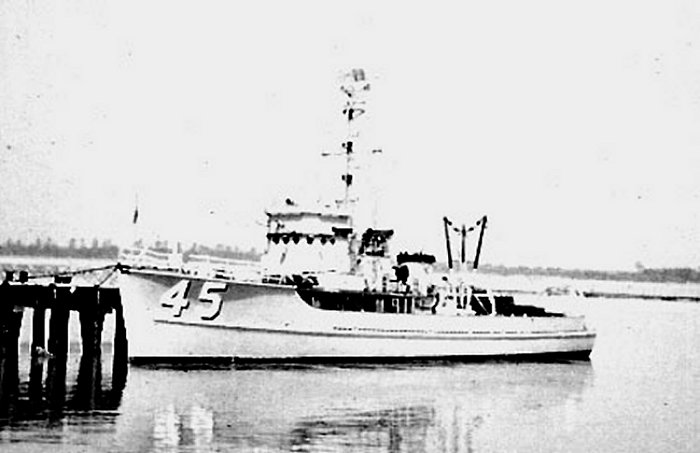
Coastal Minehunter, USS Bunting (MHC-45)

In December 1957, Mustin was promoted to lieutenant (junior grade) and wanted to command a ship. He got an important endorsement from his captain, CDR Pete Smith, and in May 1958 the Bureau of Personnel gave him command of a mine hunter, USS Bunting (MHC-45), homeported in Mayport, Florida. Five years junior to the officer he relieved, Mustin became the young skipper of a crew of thirty and an expectant father as well. His first son, Lloyd M. Mustin II, would arrive in February 1959.

The tour in Bunting proved extremely rewarding, though not without its challenges. Her mission was to identify and plot all minelike objects in the Mayport Channel and approaches to maintain an accurate plot that, in the event of war and Soviet mining of the channel, would enable ships to distinguish real mines from false positives. The challenge of the mission was distinguishing objects moving with the current. Merchant ships constantly added heavy trash to the bottom. Mustin quickly realized that his mission was essentially a "make-work operation." He thus appreciated the need to build morale. Every time the carriers would deploy, the air station band would play, making for a ceremonious occasion, to the delight of both crew and dependents. He asked that the band extend the same courtesy to Bunting whenever she deployed to Norfolk, and he got it. Moreover, when Bunting returned to her berth along the south wall, he would have his sea detail on deck to render honors to any carrier tied alongside the north wall. The relatively tiny Bunting, however, would steam past the much larger ship unseen, below the sight of the Officer of the Deck, and thus the carrier never returned honors. Mustin's annoyance led him to pay a call on the executive officer of USS Saratoga (CV-60), then the flagship of RADM George Anderson. After hearing his complaint, the good-natured Executive Officer assured him that the carrier would rectify the oversight. The next time the Bunting rendered the Saratoga honors, "all six of our sea detail came to attention and hand saluted, and six hundred guys returned it," said Mustin. "My guys loved this."

During his final month in command, Mustin took his father, by this time a rear admiral, on a day's operation. He borrowed a two-star flag from a signalman on the Saratoga for the day. When they returned that afternoon, Mustin did not render honors to the carrier, knowing that Admiral Anderson was not onboard and that his father, on the diminutive Bunting, was senior. The Saratoga's executive officer happened to be sitting in the captain's chair on the bridge and noticed the Bunting's apparent lapse. "We finally got that wise-ass kid," Mustin later heard that the officer had gleefully remarked. "He didn't render honors." The Saratoga signaled, "Why didn't you render honors when you came by?" Receiving Mustin's reply, he jumped from his chair. "Son of a bitch! He's got his father onboard." Putting his binoculars to his eyes, he saw Lloyd's borrowed two-star flag, so big it could not furl. In no time, the Saratoga sounded honors, to the delight of Lloyd, Mustin, and the Bunting crew.

=== Naval Postgraduate School ===
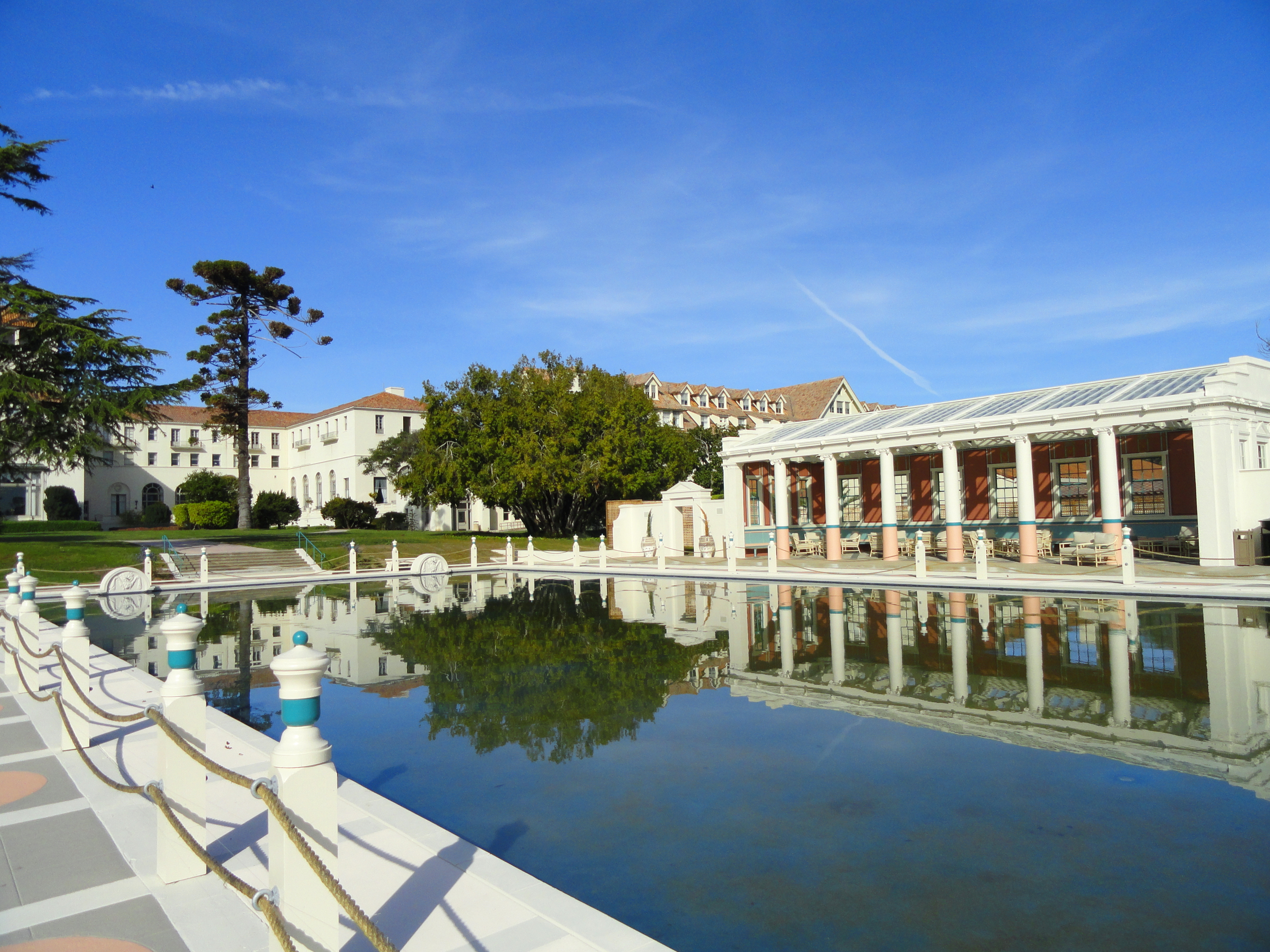
Naval Postgraduate School, Monterey, California, USA.

Aware that he had placed himself in a relative backwater, Mustin had been contemplating his next professional move. "My whole career was a series of battles with detailers about where I was going to go, what I was going to do; all of which I won, and a lot of which I got advice from my dad on." Lloyd acknowledged the fun Mustin was having and the leadership experience he was gaining, but he advised that at some point Mustin would need a technical degree before he got too senior. Bunting qualified as Mustin's second sea tour, meaning that he was slated for a shore posting. "I had gotten some offers to be a Flag Lieutenant someplace and my dad said, 'You don't want to do that. You want to stay away from being a Flag Lieutenant until you're persuaded that the guy you'll be a Flag Lieutenant for will be a force in the Navy.'" He recommended that Mustin go to the Postgraduate School, which had moved in 1952 to Monterey, California. Mustin applied and was accepted.

== Middle career ==
In July 1959, just after arriving in Monterey, Mustin made lieutenant and began his two-year postgraduate course. With an eye to the future, he took electrical engineering. "I had this idea that in terms of what the Navy was going to do in my career, the advances would be more in the area of electronics and electricity than they would in the area of propulsion, or any other area."

It was a prescient move. With the onset of the missile era, ordnance and electrical engineering went hand in hand, and Mustin's two years at school coincided with the transition from vacuum tubes to transistors. He could be certain that his knowledge of the new technologies would have practical application once he returned to sea. Already, Mustin was maturing in his profession. While at school he deepened a predisposition he shared with his father to approach problems technically. He viewed naval officers as engineers, contrary to the growing trend in some quarters to see them as managers. To his mind, engineering was the basis of their knowledge. The tools of the trade were engineering-related, and mastery of those tools was vital, particularly when an officer at sea.

In November 1960, Lucy gave birth to their second son, Thomas Russell. As it had been for his father in Annapolis, the Mustins' time at the Postgraduate School was an enjoyable time of family and reunion.

=== USS Lawrence (DDG-4) ===
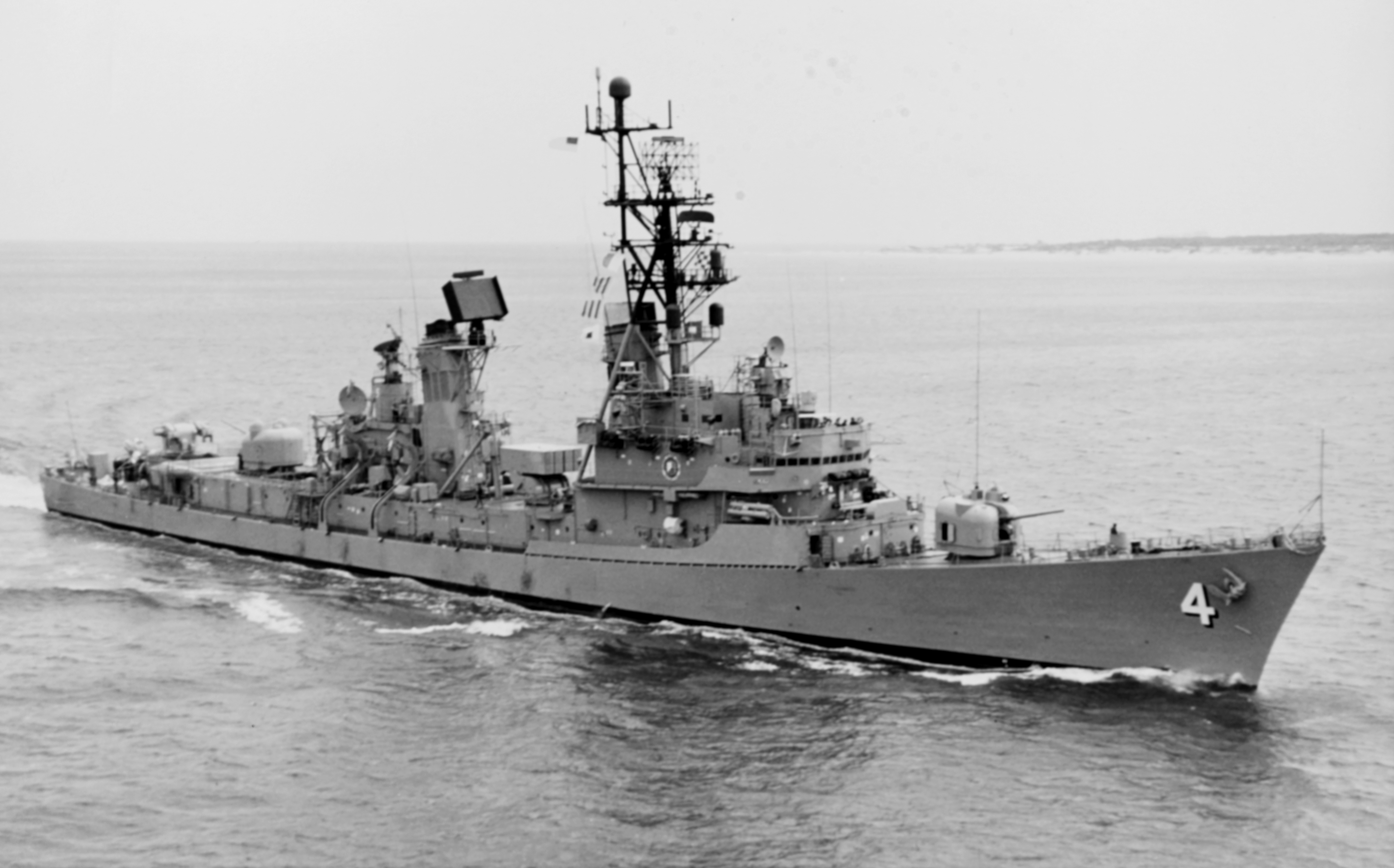
USS Lawrence (DDG-4)

Mustin's follow-on sea assignment was chief engineer on the commissioning crew for one of the navy's newest guided-missile destroyers USS Lawrence (DDG-4). The missile destroyer was completing construction at the New York Shipbuilding Co. in Camden, New Jersey. In late June 1961, Mustin and Lucy, pregnant with their third child Katherine Elizabeth, packed the boys into the car for another drive across the continent. Mustin soon found he had to deal with a 1,200-pound-per-square-inch engineering plant that was, in his view, a disaster. For six months, he battled the yard daily. "There were indications coming back that there were engineering problems, but the focus was on the missile system, the Tartar system, because it was the gee-whiz part of the ship."

Foremost among these problems was the inability to maintain the equipment at sea. The navy's ship designers claimed that the boilers' automatic combustion controls eliminated the need to man a number of stations, in particular, around the feed pumps. As a result, the pumps and spaces had no ventilation and became too hot to touch. Routine maintenance at sea proved impossible, so his men had to maintain the plant during weekends while the ship was in port. With the rest of the crew on liberty, the inequity made for a serious morale issue. The 1,200-pound plant was "one of the greatest mistakes that the Navy ever made," said Mustin. By the early 1970s, its problems had infected the whole class of destroyers, leading the navy to establish the Propulsion Examining Board (PEB).

Just before Christmas, the yard delivered Lawrence, which was commissioned on 6 January of the new year, with CDR Thomas W. Walsh in command. She joined the Atlantic Fleet and the navy's first all-missile destroyer squadron commanded by one of Mustin's heroes, CAPT Ike Kidd. Her homeport was Norfolk, Virginia, and in the Spring of 1962, Lucy and the children moved to Virginia Beach and the first house the Mustins would own.

During the Cuban Missile Crisis that autumn, the ship got orders to get underway. Although they understood that the orders had to do with Soviet missiles entering Cuba, Mustin and the ship's company were not to tell their families where they were going, how long they would be at sea, or why. On the evening of 22 October, President John F. Kennedy went on national television to announce a quarantine of Cuba. The operation order had read that the Lawrence would participate in a blockade, but a second order came as she was leaving Hampton Roads, telling them to strike "blockade" - under international law, an act of war - and insert "quarantine." The Lawrence was en route to make the first interception of a Soviet ship. Halfway to her intercept point, an order came to change her destination. The destroyer USS Joseph P. Kennedy Jr. (DD-850) would conduct the first interception.

Glory thus snatched, Lawrence remained at sea for 80 days, steaming in circles with the nuclear carrier USS Enterprise (CVN-65) and other ships. Early in the quarantine operation, the navy had begun to make plans to invade Cuba, but as Mustin discovered later, commandant of the Marine Corps GEN David M. Shoup determined that, despite the eight carriers involved in the operation, the navy did not have enough firepower to support an amphibious assault. The Iowa-class battleships that had provided shore bombardment during the Korean War had all been decommissioned and mothballed in the late 1950s and consequently the force had no guns larger than 5-inch. Recognizing the lack of fire support, Shoup soon became very vocal in his objection to continued construction of the new Leahy-class guided missile Destroyer Leader (DLG). It had no guns except a 3-inch saluting battery amidships. Eventually, the navy put a 5-inch gun on the fantail of the final seven. At the operational level, the crisis devolved for Mustin and the engineering department into a major test, one that they passed. Fortunately, CAPT Brian McCauley, the destroyer division commander, had been a chief engineer and recognized the challenge. Mustin believed that McCauley's concurrent fitness report helped him get early selection for lieutenant commander.

When Lawrence returned to Norfolk, the ship's first weapons officer left. CDR Walsh asked Mustin to relieve him. "I became the first guy who was both the Chief Engineer and the Weapons Officer for one of these ships." Right away, he went to a thirteen-week fire control school in Dam Neck, Virginia. Having just completed postgraduate school, he was on top of his game. "When they put the circuit diagrams on the board, I could solve them before the prof could walk through them, because I had recently acquired this electrical engineering degree."

During the course, the head of the short-staffed school asked Mustin and four other junior officers to help him write a new naval warfare publication called "Fleet Air Defense," which became Naval Warfare Publication 32. With only six months on the Lawrence as chief engineer, Mustin had been nonetheless standing watches on the bridge and in the combat information center. He thus had an understanding of all the tactical options for missile employment. The publication remained "90 percent the same" into the mid-1980s when, as Second Fleet commander, Mustin challenged his staff and students to "get this publication out of the Stone Ages and bring it up to date." The 1962 effort by Mustin and his fellow junior officers predated the introduction of the Navy Tactical Data System (NTDS) in the USS King (DDG-41), a Coontz-class guided-missile Destroyer Leader, and addressed defense against aircraft as opposed to missiles.

In mid-winter 1963, he returned to the Lawrence and deployed to the Mediterranean with the first nuclear-powered surface combatant, USS Bainbridge (CGN-25), then classed as a guided missile frigate. Once stateside, Mustin got orders ashore. Just previously, CDR Worth Bagley had relieved Walsh as the skipper, thus beginning a deep friendship dating from the Lawrence that Mustin regarded as "one of the defining professional relationships" of his career. Mustin preferred orders to remain at sea, possibly to command a destroyer escort, and with Bagley's support, he presented his request personally to the Bureau of Personnel. His detailer lectured him on the importance of the shore establishment. "He treated me like an idiot," Mustin said. Disgusted, he went to see his Placement Officer, CAPT Al MacLane. While he was in MacLane's office, word came that the executive officer of a new-construction guided-missile destroyer, USS Conyngham (DDG-17), had suffered a nervous breakdown. Although Mustin was still a lieutenant, MacLane got him the job, with orders to report immediately to New York Shipbuilding.

=== USS Conyngham (DDG-17) ===
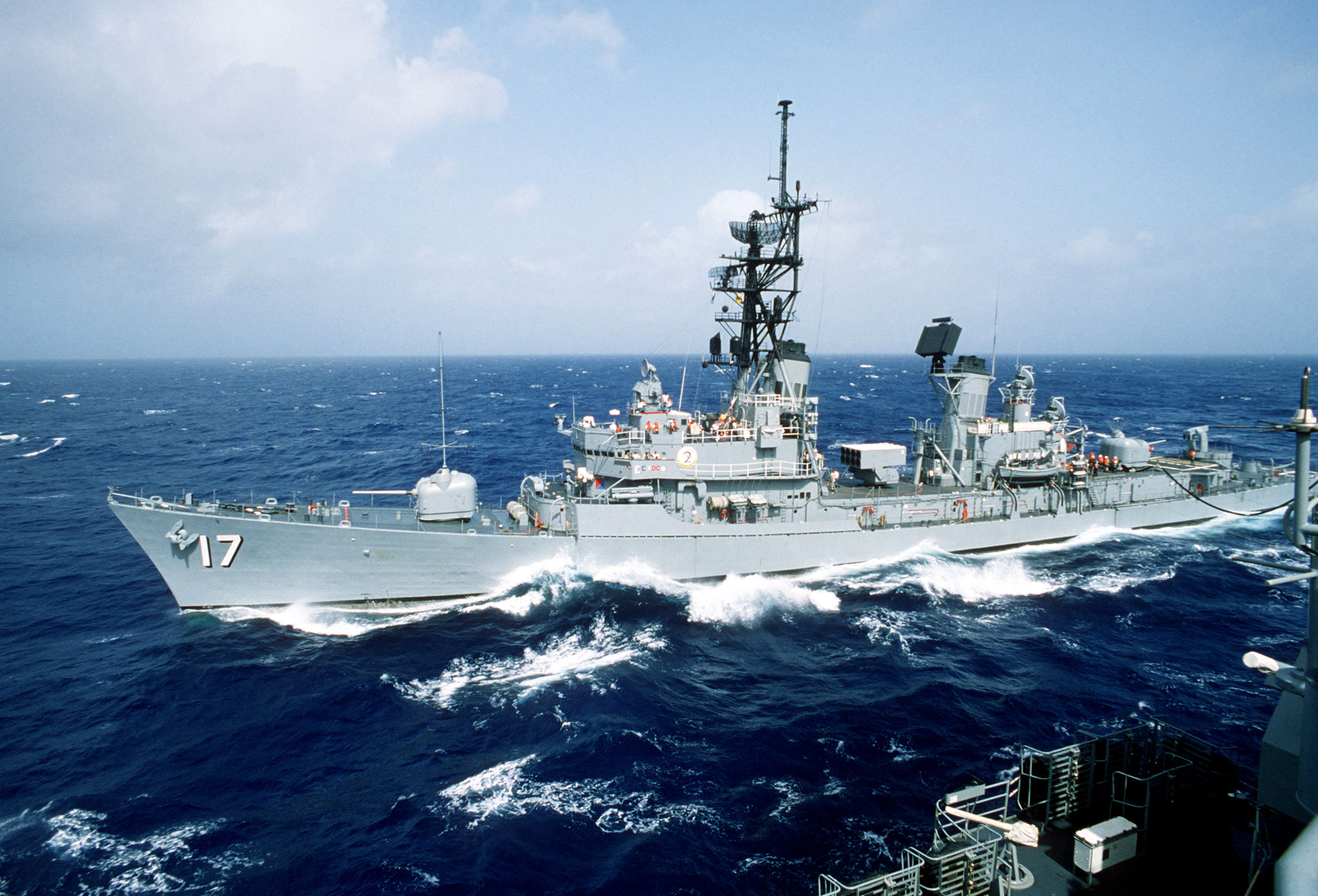
USS Conyngham (DDG-17)

The executive officers of the new-construction guided missile destroyers were all lieutenant commanders with at least five years' seniority on Mustin. Though junior in years, he had served as both chief engineer and weapons officer on the commissioning crew of the second ship in the class. He knew the ships extremely well; he was well versed in the dealings with New York Shipbuilding, and he had gained invaluable experience with the missile navy, as Maclane had appreciated. "Al had gone way out on a limb by sending this very junior officer to such a job," said Mustin. "I was the only lieutenant ever to be XO of a new construction DDG." After a lot of hard work, the ship "set all kinds of records, had the best INSURV that anybody had ever had, won all the Es as we did in the Lawrence: everything we did, we did superbly."

Solid state components had entered the fleet during construction of the Conyngham, so maintenance of the weapon systems was not the great challenge it had been on the Lawrence. With the arrival of the King and the early version of the NTDS, Mustin and his fellow officers were able to focus more on tactical development that incorporated the new capabilities. By the early 1960s, with the introduction of missiles, the idea of anti-air warfare was to launch a guided weapon that could make a kill in a single shot. The anticipated targets now were missiles instead of airplanes. The new threat required further refinements to anti-air warfare tactics.

When the navy came to appreciate that missiles presented increasingly long-range engagement issues, anti-air warfare became an aviation as well as surface Navy issue. Only aircraft could engage enemy aircraft beyond the surface to air missile range. The idea was to "shoot at the archer and not the arrow." One very real risk in a crowded sky was in shooting down friendly planes. Both the surface and aviation unions now had a stake in tactical development.

At the time, the navy leadership came primarily from the aviation community. It believed that aviation could prevent Soviet aircraft from getting within two hundred to three hundred miles (320 to 480 km) of a battle group to shoot a missile. The debate over whether manned aircraft or missiles would best perform the intercepts devolved into a fight between unions over who would get the funds to structure the force.

Mustin thus found himself involved in the genesis of fleet air defense against missiles, the tactical threat that would absorb the rest of his career and the next two decades of Navy development. After wrestling with these missile-navy issues, a tremendous number of ship captains and department heads, notably weapons department heads, would rise to flag officer rank into the 1970s.

In the 1960s, however the navy was paying scant attention to anti-surface tactics, naval gunfire support, and gunnery in general. In July 1964, halfway through his tour, Mustin made lieutenant commander a year early. Remembering Shoup's point that the surface Navy could not support an amphibious invasion of Cuba, he thought the Conyngham ought to spend a lot of time on gunfire support. The computers in the Conyngham, one of the last of the Adams-class, Mustin knew, were digital and worked on Cartesian coordinates. The procedure "was borderline unworkable," he said. "The fire support doctrine had guys cranking north-south-east-west dials trying to get a vector at 45 degrees, so I invented a whole new procedure in which you used north-south-east-west coordinates instead of polar coordinates." To avoid the hand cranking, he had his department use a Cartesian plotting board that cut time by 70 percent and increased accuracy. Wholly counter to the commander's existing doctrine, his solution, despite record scores, earned the ship penalties during the force competitions at Guantanamo for not following procedure. He persisted and eventually got approval for his new gunfire support procedure, which was used throughout the destroyer force and later employed extensively for naval gunfire support in Vietnam. For this work, he got a Navy Achievement Medal, at the time rarely awarded.

The Conyngham spent many weeks at sea performing acceptance tests for the new missile systems. Mustin recalled that during her first year in commission the ship had only thirteen days in Norfolk before she deployed to the Mediterranean. The destroyer conducted a series of missile firings with the French navy and performed well, setting a record for seven straight successful shots. She issued a press release touting her success - a move that upset the Atlantic Fleet commander, who regarded the feat as a rather mean achievement. "He didn't want it public how bad things were."

Mustin's virtually uninterrupted sea duty made for a very tough time for Lucy, who, left with three young children, was at her wits' end. He made certain that she was able to join him on the Med deployment. Together, they had two weeks in Paris, plus time in Naples and Barcelona. When they returned, it appeared that the United States was slowly escalating into war. Mustin, however, had orders to the Naval War College.

=== U.S. Naval War College ===
Echoing Lloyd's sentiments, Mustin regarded the War College as a gentleman's club. "Unlike the Army where it was 'no war college, no general's stars,' the navy would only send officers it could spare for a year. [The college] didn't ask for or require a lot of commitment," he said. The course did require him to write a number of professional papers, one of which was on air defense and caught the attention of the college's president, VADM John T. "Chick" Hayward. Writing his thesis on the Yalta Conference, Mustin would finish the program as a distinguished graduate.

While at Newport, Mustin decided to broaden his horizons to the larger questions of politico-military affairs. Concurrently, he took George Washington University's extension course for a master's degree in international affairs. The commitment was intense and required him to study nights and weekends. Also enrolled in the university's extension program were a number of students, mostly aviators, who had returned from Vietnam combat. "I could see similarities between the way these newly blooded contemporaries of mine approached life and the way the combat veterans of World War II had approached theirs when I had been a midshipman at the Naval Academy." Intrigued, Mustin chose Vietnam as his thesis topic. Steeping himself in the country's history, he was influenced by Bernard Fall's 1961 classic Street without Joy: The Bloody Road to Dien Bien Phu, the account of the French army's eight-year war in Indochina.

=== Brown-water operations in Vietnam ===
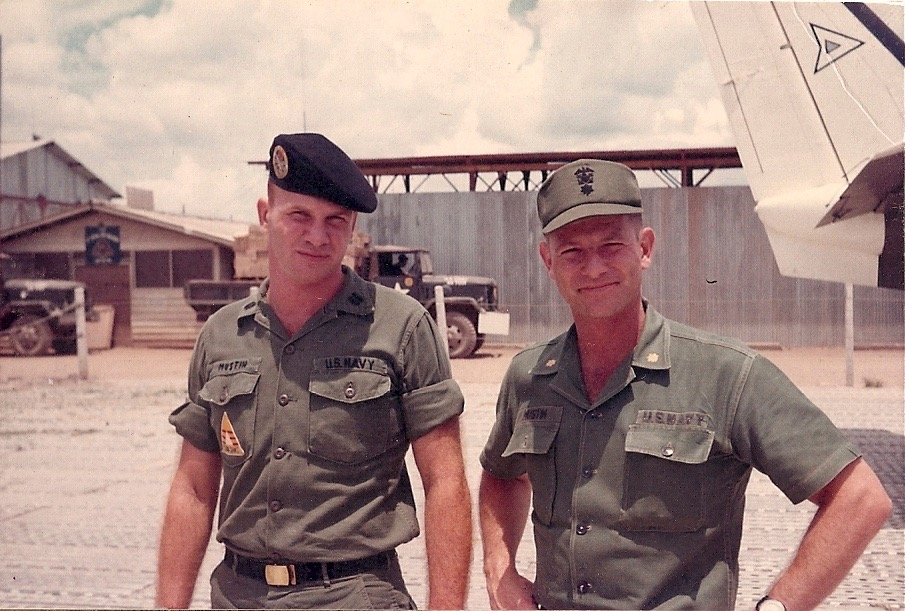
LCDR Henry C. Mustin and brother LT Thomas M. Mustin, Mekong Delta, 1966

In the spring of 1966, nearing the end of his program at the Naval War College, Mustin came to Washington to the Bureau of Personnel to request his next assignment. While in town, he discussed his future with his dad. "At the end of every war, the Navy and all the services divide themselves up into those who fought and those who didn't. If you didn't fight," offered Lloyd, "it doesn't matter what the reason was, you're not going to stay competitive. So, go on over there and fight."

Thus advised, Mustin went to the bureau the following day and requested Vietnam duty. The response was not encouraging. "We're not sending any Naval Academy graduates over there," said his detailer. "That's for a bunch of [limited duty officers] and ex-enlisted men." Mustin persisted, but his detailer was unmoved. He offered Mustin a job as an aide in the Office of the Chief of Naval Operations, an offer he declined. Returning to the War College, he later received orders as flag secretary to the commander of naval forces in Vietnam. The Bureau gave him just ten days to get to Saigon.

Lucy decided she would return to Coronado, where most of their family and friends were, while Mustin was overseas. Wasting no time, they loaded the children and a few suitcases into the car for another drive cross country. Their furniture and effects would take thirty days to cross the country, and by the time they arrived, Mustin was gone. On 7 July, attempting to make light of a deeply emotional parting, he left her the words, "So long, kid. I'll see you when I've won the war." For the rest of his life he would hold in his mind the image of his "beautiful, young, pregnant wife standing in an empty living room, surrounded by three tiny children."

Mustin crossed the Pacific "very unhappy." Ordinarily, he would have gone first to the river patrol boat school in Coronado, but his orders had him going straight to Vietnam. He chose to believe that the navy had an urgent need for him, that he was replacing someone killed in the line of duty. "I got over there, and the guy I'm replacing meets me at the airport, at Tan Son Nhut, in whites," Mustin recalled. "This was not my idea of Terry and the Pirates." His assignment was to Saigon, to the staff of RDML Norvell G. Ward, a World War II submarine hero. Mustin settled into a room in a hotel in Cholon, Saigon's Chinese section. From the outset, he made Ward's life "miserable." "Everyday I went in and said, 'I got to get out to the field and get a job.'" Two weeks after Mustin's arrival in Vietnam, his cousin Joe Howard suddenly appeared. Joe was in Saigon for two and a half weeks of helicopter training with the Army, en route to the Mekong Delta to command a Seawolf squadron.

In the summer of 1966, when the two cousins arrived in Vietnam, the United States abandoned its bombing campaign against North Vietnamese petroleum, oil, and lubricants. Disenchanted with its results, Defense Secretary Robert McNamara shifted to a more defensive strategy that stressed pacification in the South and interdiction of supplies to the Viet Cong. In 1965, the navy had begun Operation Market Time, a coastal maritime interdiction campaign. In May 1966, the new emphasis prompted Operation Game Warden, to augment the river patrol boat force in the Mekong Delta to disrupt and hopefully sever the cross-river supply lines in the Viet Cong's regional stronghold south of Saigon. A key component of Game Warden was its air support element. To that end, in August, Joe and his air crews from the navy's Helicopter Support Squadron 1 replaced the Army personnel who had been operating in the Delta.

Left behind in Saigon, Mustin was now even more eager to get into the real in-country action. He was frustrated to find himself merely a "Saigon commando." As for Ward, he was a naval two-star in a largely three-star organization. He did not even have a seat in the senior officers' mess. "The Army had more generals in-country than they had in Europe in World War II," Mustin maintained. After four months of pestering Ward for a transfer, Mustin finally got orders to be the chief staff officer for CDR Jim Cronander, the commanding officer of the Delta River Patrol Group, Task Group 116.1. Arriving in Can Tho in November, Mustin was the second senior naval officer south of Saigon.

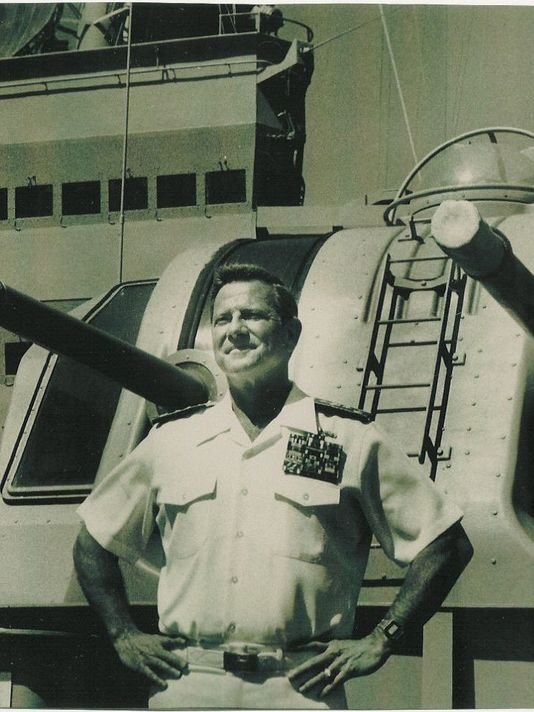
VADM Henry C. Mustin aboard his flagship USS Mount Whitney (LCC-20), 1988

== Later career ==
He died in Suffolk Virginia in 2016

== Family ==
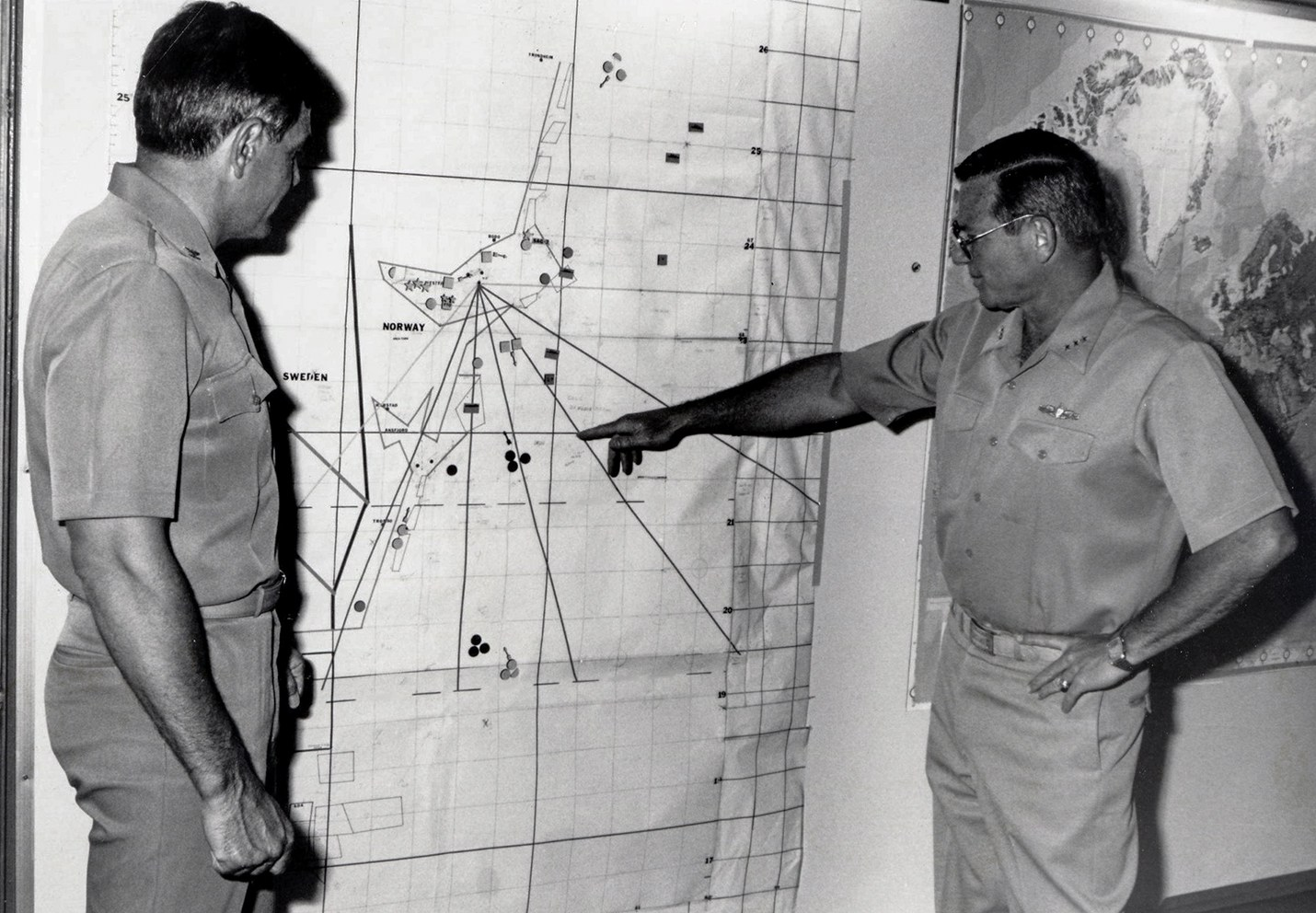
VADM Mustin discusses details of a fleet exercise in Norway aboard USS Mount Whitney (LCC-20).

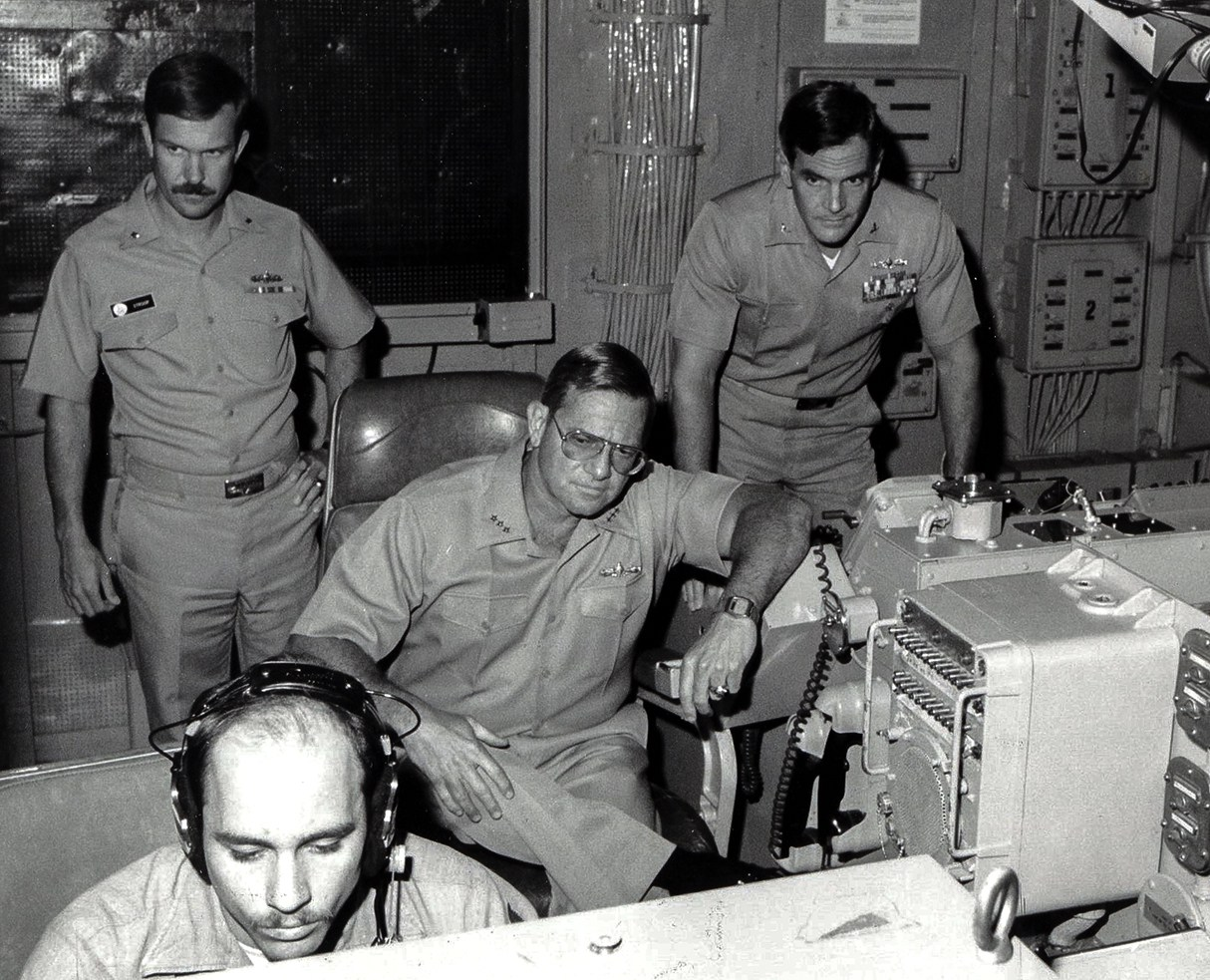
VADM Mustin during a Second Fleet exercise, 1988.

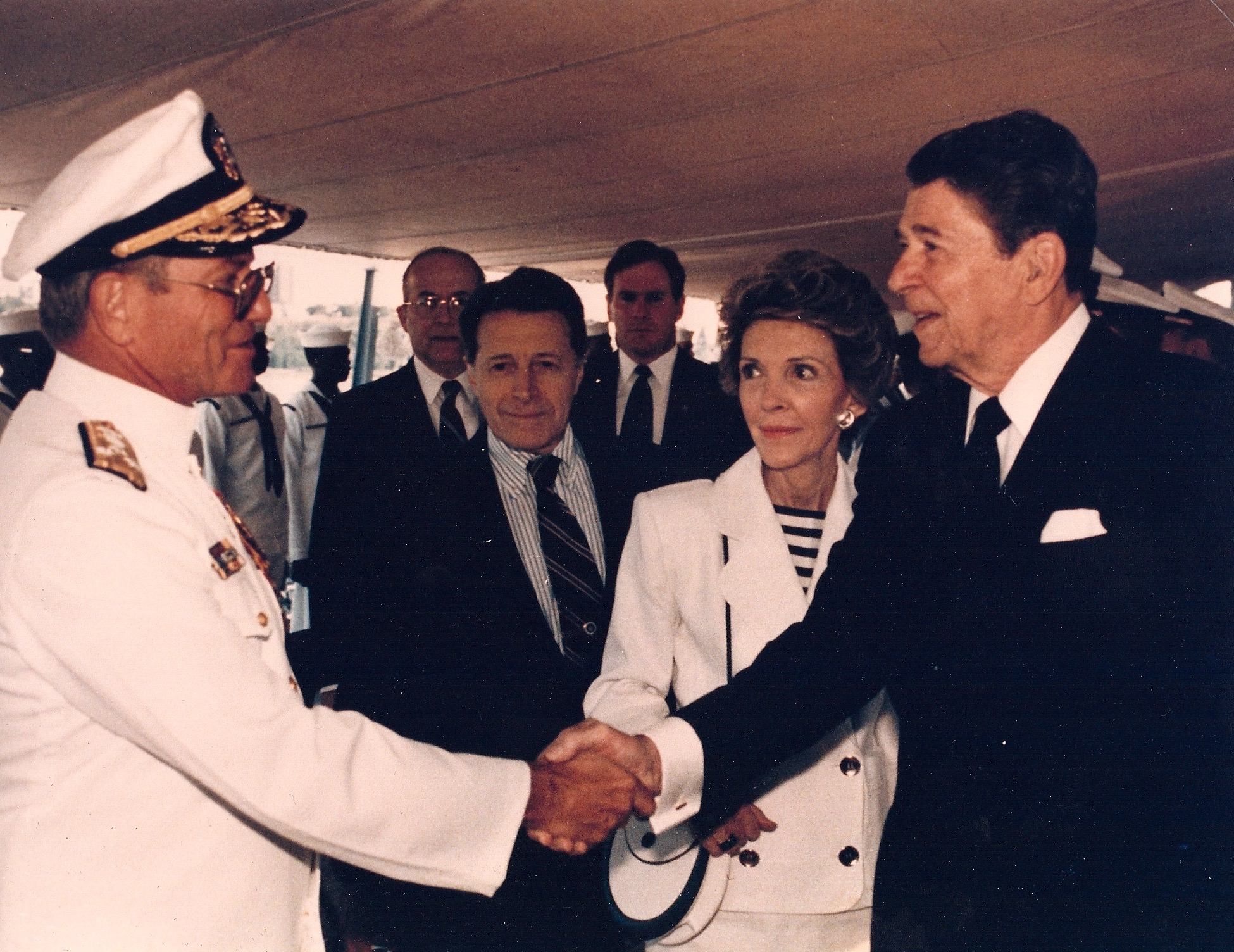
VADM Henry C. Mustin greeting President Ronald Reagan at the Statue of Liberty Centennial Celebration in New York, New York, July 3, 1986

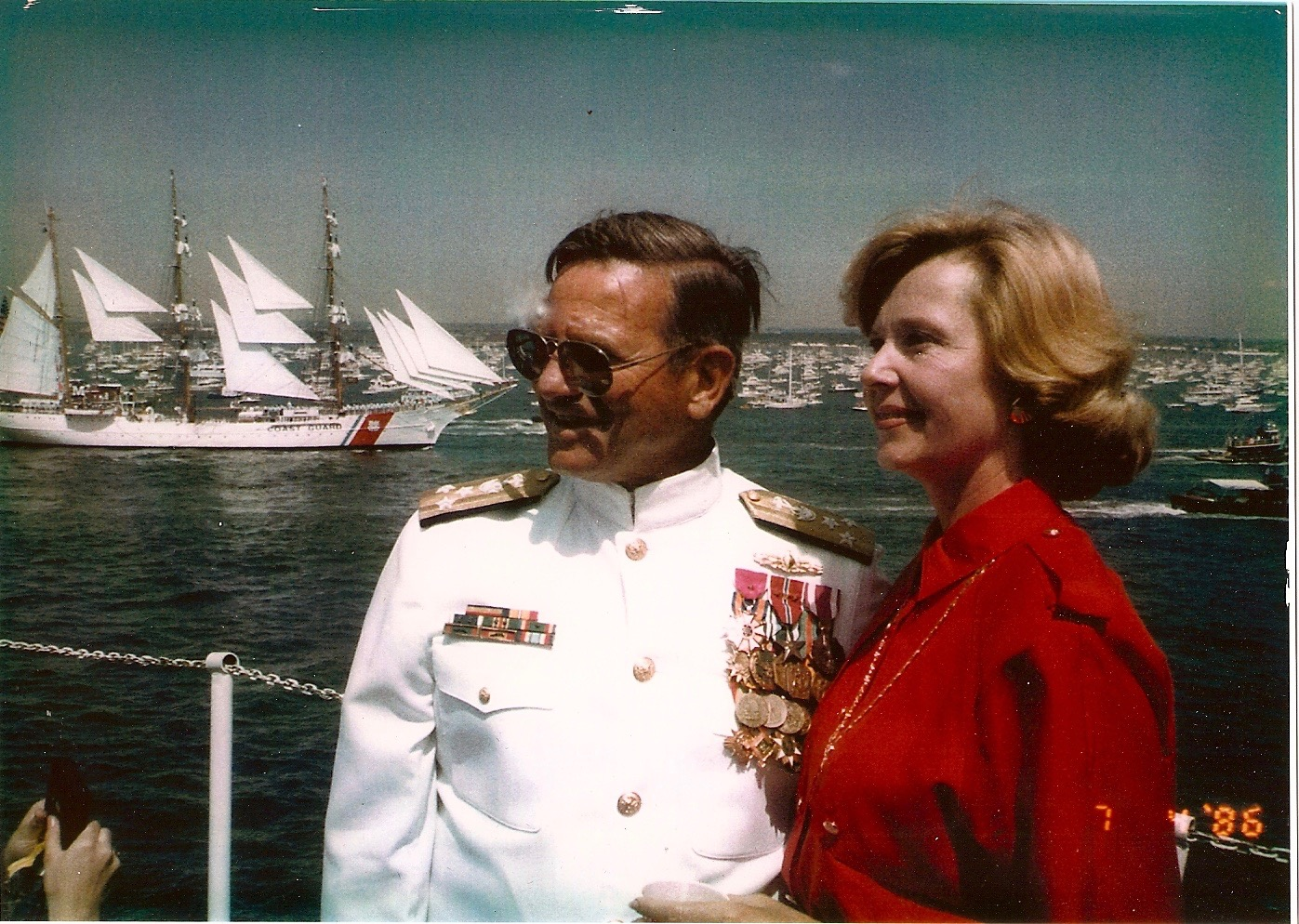
VADM and Mrs. Henry C. Mustin at the 1986 Statue of Liberty centennial celebration.

Born into an illustrious naval family on both his mother's and father's sides, Vice Admiral Henry C. Mustin furthered the family's reputation for service to country. His father’s side dated back to the War of 1812. His third-great-grandfather was Commodore Arthur Sinclair IV, who was voted a silver service by Congress for victories over the British in the Battle of the Great Lakes in 1812. And then there were a series of Arthur Sinclairs, one of whom commanded the stores ship Supply in Commodore Perry's expedition to open Japan. During the American Civil War another Arthur Sinclair, VADM Mustin's great-great-uncle, served in the Confederate States Navy with Captain Raphael Semmes in the CSS Alabama and fought in the Battle of Hampton Roads aboard CSS Virginia. Then down from that side, his grandfather and namesake, Captain Henry C. Mustin, was the first of many Mustins to attend the United States Naval Academy as a member of the Class of 1896. He was Naval Aviator #11 and considered by many to be the father of naval aviation, having established Naval Air Station Pensacola, being the first to be catapulted off a ship underway, and being in command of the aviation detachment that fought at the Battle of Veracruz, which was the first time that any U.S. aviator of any service was fired on by ground forces. Admiral Mustin's grandmother, Corinne Mustin, was a first cousin of Wallis Simpson, the Duchess of Windsor. When his grandfather Henry Mustin died, she remarried Admiral George D. Murray, Naval Academy Class of 1910. Murray was captain of the Enterprise during the Doolittle Raid and at the Battle of Midway, and was a close friend of Admiral Chester Nimitz. After the Japanese surrendered to the United States on board USS Missouri, Admiral Nimitz signed a copy of the picture to Admiral Murray with thanks. At the end of the war, he was the commander of the Mariana Islands, and accepted the Japanese surrender of the Caroline Islands aboard his flagship, the cruiser Portland (CA-33). Admiral Mustin's great-uncle was General George Barnett, Naval Academy Class of 1881 and 12th commandant of the U.S. Marine Corps. Mustin was the third generation of his family to attend the US Naval academy. His father, Vice Admiral Lloyd M. Mustin, was Naval Academy class of 1932. His brother and one of his sons also graduated from Annapolis. Mustin said: "I’m the class of ’55, my brother, Tom, is the class of 62, and my youngest son, John, is the class of ’90."

On his mother’s side, Admiral Mustin's great-grandfather, Admiral Thomas Benton Howard, was Naval Academy Class of 1876. Admiral Howard was among the Captains of the "Great White Fleet" in command of USS Ohio. Admiral Howard was CinCPacFlt at the Battle of Veracruz. Admiral Howard's son, and Admiral Mustin's great-uncle, Captain Douglas L. Howard, Naval Academy Class of 1906, earned a Navy Cross during WWII. VADM Mustin's maternal grandfather, Captain James P. Morton, Naval Academy Class of 1895, fought with Admiral George Dewey at the Battle of Manila Bay and was superintendent of the naval Postgraduate School. His mother’s brother was Rear Admiral Thomas H. Morton, Naval Academy Class of 1933.

== Commemoration ==
The U.S. Navy guided-missile destroyer USS Mustin (DDG-89) is named for the Mustin family.

== See also ==
- Mustin family
