= USS Mustin =

USS Mustin may refer to:

- USS Mustin (DD-413), was a Sims-class destroyer during World War II
- USS Mustin (DDG-89), is an Arleigh Burke-class guided missile destroyer currently in active service
