= USS Mustin (DD-413) =

Sims-class destroyer

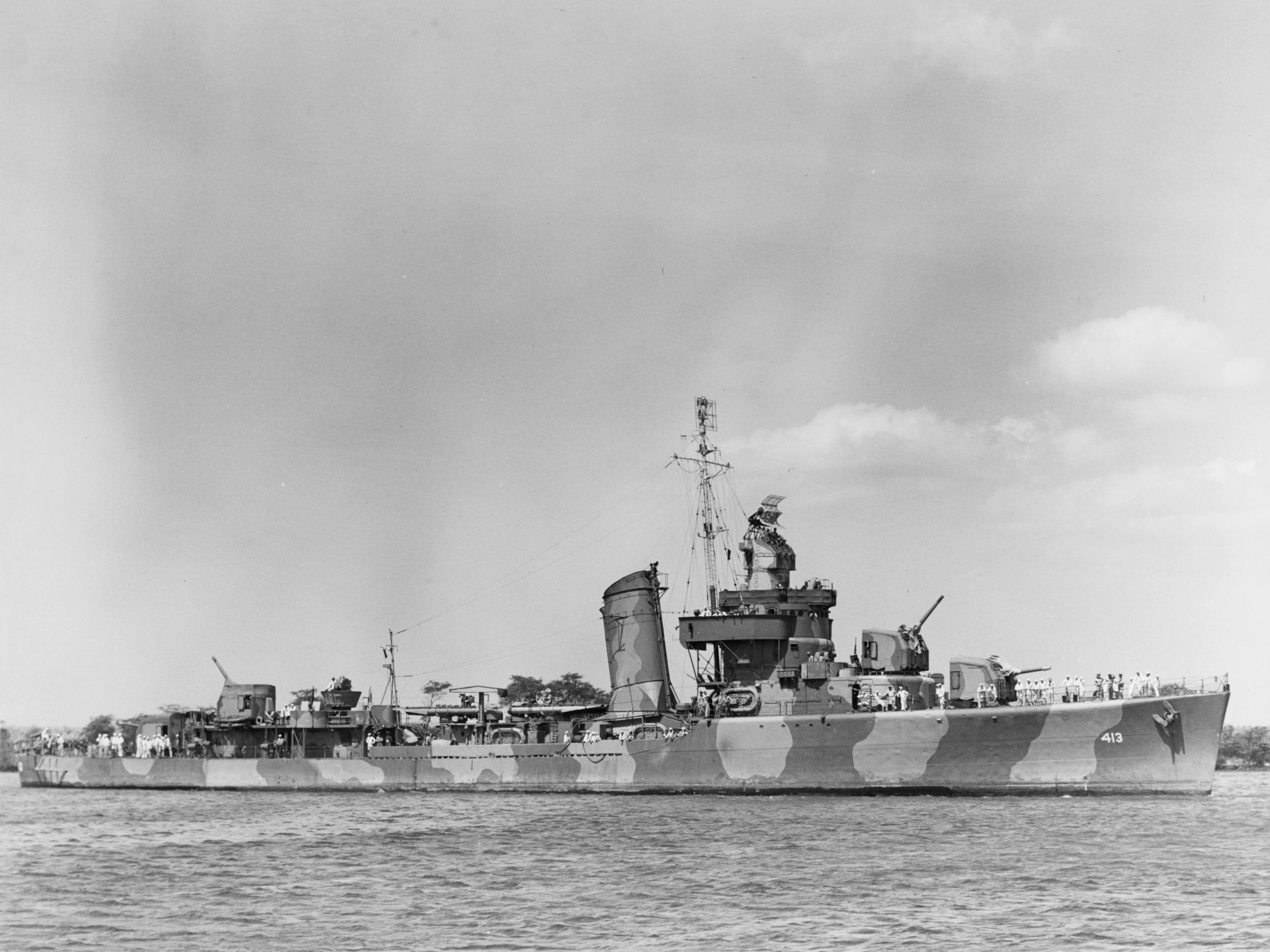
- USS Mustin at Pearl Harbor, Hawaii on 14 June 1942

History

United States
- Builder: Newport News Shipbuilding
- Laid down: 20 December 1937
- Launched: 8 December 1938
- Commissioned: 15 September 1939
- Decommissioned: 29 August 1946
- Stricken: 30 April 1948
- Honors and awards: American Defense Service Medal ("Fleet" clasp, "A" device), Asiatic–Pacific Campaign Medal (2 stars), World War II Victory Medal, Navy Occupation Service Medal ("Japan" clasp)
- Fate: Scuttled off Kwajalein, 18 April 1948

General characteristics
- Class & type: Sims-class destroyer
- Displacement: 1,570 long tons (1,600 t) (std); 2,211 long tons (2,246 t) (full)
- Length: 348 ft 3 1/4 in (106.2 m)
- Beam: 36 ft 1 in (11.0 m)
- Draft: 13 ft 4.5 in (4.1 m)
- Propulsion: High-pressure super-heated boilers; Geared turbines with twin screws; 50,000 hp (37,000 kW)
- Speed: 35 knots (65 km/h; 40 mph)
- Range: 3,660 nmi (6,780 km; 4,210 mi) at 20 kn (37 km/h; 23 mph)
- Complement: 192 (10 officers/182 enlisted)
- Armament: 5 × 5 inch/38, in single mounts; 4 × .50 caliber/90, in single mounts; 8 × 21 inch torpedo tubes in two quadruple mounts; 2 × depth charge track, 10 depth charges

USS Mustin (DD-413) was a Sims-class destroyer of the United States Navy, the first Navy ship of that name, in honor of Captain Henry C. Mustin (1874–1923), a pioneer of naval aviation.

== Construction and commissioning ==
Mustin was laid down on 20 December 1937 by Newport News Shipbuilding & Dry Dock Co., Newport News, Virginia; launched on 8 December 1938; sponsored by Mrs. Lloyd M. Mustin, daughter-in-law of Captain Mustin; and commissioned on 15 September 1939.

== Service history ==
=== Inter-War Period ===
Mustin joined the Atlantic Fleet for the tense period of neutrality patrol preceding American entry in World War II, playing her part in guarding the western Atlantic. On 7 December 1941, she lay in overhaul at Boston Navy Yard, Massachusetts, but put to sea next day escorting Idaho and Mississippi off to war. She herself completed overhaul in Charleston Navy Yard, South Carolina on 3 January 1942, transited the Panama Canal on 20 January, and arrived at Pearl Harbor on 17 February for duty escorting convoys between Hawaii and San Francisco until 3 April.

=== World War II ===
==== South Pacific, May 1942 – April 1943 ====
A convoy mission to Samoa was completed at Pearl Harbor on 24 May. Mustin next escorted a merchantman with reinforcements to Midway Island, threatened by the Japanese attack which exploded while Mustin was returning to Pearl Harbor, where she arrived on 5 June. Two days later, the destroyer sailed with Task Force 17 (TF 17), searching for scattered Japanese survivors of the great battle of Midway. After a negative search, the force returned to Hawaiian waters on 13 June, and Mustin began 2 months of training and patrols out of Pearl Harbor.

Mustin sailed on 17 August with TF 17, the Hornet group, bound for an important role in the great sea warfare which wrested the Southwest Pacific from the Japanese. Her group covered the southern approaches to Guadalcanal during the initial phase of fighting there, then struck Buin, Faisi, and Tonolai from the air. In the Battle of the Santa Cruz Islands on 26 October, Mustin rescued 337 of Hornet's survivors, and had the grim duty of destroying the heavily damaged carrier with a full salvo of torpedoes. She avenged the carrier in part by shooting down five enemy aircraft during the battle.

Patrol and convoy duty from Nouméa and Espiritu Santo alternated with task force duty, and on 11 November, she joined TF 16 for the Naval Battle of Guadalcanal. On 25 December, Mustin fired shore bombardment at enemy positions on Guadalcanal, to which she had just escorted transports. In February 1943, she again guarded carrier operations off Guadalcanal, then returned to patrol and escort duties until 14 April, when she returned to Pearl Harbor.

==== North Pacific, April – August 1943 ====
Ten days later, Mustin reached Adak, Alaska, where she joined the patrol northwest of the island until the end of May, when her force sailed to cover the occupation of Attu Island. Through the summer, she patrolled the foggy, treacherous waters of the Aleutians, bombarding Kiska a number of times, and blocking Japanese reinforcement of that island. On the night of 25/26 July, her group was engaged in the freak "Battle of the Pips", firing on what was actually a phantom Japanese force created only on radar by unusual atmospheric conditions. After covering the American recapture of Kiska on 15 August, Mustin headed for a Mare Island Naval Shipyard overhaul, from which she returned to Pearl Harbor on 31 October.

==== Central Pacific, November 1943 – October 1944 ====
Mustin sortied with TF 52 on 10 November for the assault on Makin in the Gilberts 10 days later, then returned to the west coast for rehearsal amphibious operations off San Pedro, California. She arrived in Lahaina Roads, Maui on 21 January 1944 to stage for the Marshall Islands Campaign, and on the 30th bombarded enemy positions on Wotje. The next day, she screened cruisers pounding Kwajalein, and on 1 February joined in firing at the atoll. For the next 2 weeks, she escorted various task groups around Kwajalein, then operated off newly captured Eniwetok until returning to Pearl Harbor on 3 March.

Mustin next joined the support force of powerful TF 58, protecting vital fleet oilers as the carriers and planes they fueled struck Palau, Yap, Woleai, and Ulithi in the Carolines on 30 March – 1 April. She returned to the southwest Pacific on 7 April to screen carriers in amphibious assaults on New Guinea, at Aitape and Hollandia (currently known as Jayapura) in April, and at Wakde in May. The continuing operations on and around New Guinea gave Mustin varied duty, on escort, patrol, bombardment, and as fighter-director, as one landing after another moved up the coast to wrest the huge island from the enemy. Noemfoor, Sansapor, Mios Woendi, Humboldt Bay, Biak were all struck by forces in which Mustin served.

==== Philippines, October 1944 – February 1945 ====
On 15 September, Mustin served as primary fighter-director in the initial assault on Morotai, Netherlands East Indies, and after escorting reinforcements there from New Guinea, cleared Humboldt Bay on 16 October with reinforcements for newly invaded Leyte. Arriving on 25 October, Mustin departed the same day, escorting a convoy safely away from the Battle for Leyte Gulf. Escort operations among the bases of the western Pacific followed as Mustin gave distant support to the Philippines operation, before returning to Leyte Gulf on 25 November to join the local defense force under attack by enemy planes on 27 November. Mustin splashed three.

After rehearsals off New Guinea, Mustin sortied for the assault on Luzon on 9 January 1945, and for the next month fired in support of land forces, joined in repelling enemy air attack off Lingayen, and made antisubmarine patrols. She operated in the Philippines, aiding in movement of reinforcements until 2 February, when she sailed for Guadalcanal, off which she joined the 5th Fleet, serving as antisubmarine patrol ship while awaiting the beginning of the rehearsals for the Battle of Okinawa.

==== Okinawa, March–May 1945 ====
Her task group staged at Ulithi, and arrived off Hagushi Beach, Okinawa on 1 April, screening the transport area as the initial assault was made. For the next 4 days, she guarded the transports off the beaches by day and during their night retirements, firing on the numerous kamikaze attackers. From 5 to 17 April, Mustin sailed to bring a convoy in from Saipan and Ulithi, then returned to fire support, radar picket, antisubmarine, and antiaircraft duty off Okinawa until 2 May, when she joined the screen of an escort carrier group operating to the southwest of Okinawa.

Mustin left Okinawa on 28 May for Guam, Pearl Harbor, Eniwetok, and San Pedro, arriving on 18 June for a yard overhaul and alterations. The war ended 6 days before she left San Pedro. After refresher training, Mustin sailed for occupation duty in Japan, arriving Ominato, Honshū on 16 September.

=== Post-War ===
==== Operation Crossroads ====
Late in the year she returned to the west coast and sailed back to Hawaii to prepare for Operation Crossroads, the atomic tests at Bikini Atoll, in which she was engaged through the summer of 1946. She decommissioned on 29 August 1946 after use as a target; remained at Bikini; and was destroyed by gunfire on 18 April 1948 in the Marshall Islands.

== Awards ==
Mustin received 13 battle stars for World War II service.
