= George Francis Henrechon =

United States Navy Medal of Honor recipient

- Born: November 22, 1885; Hartford, Connecticut, US
- Died: August 16, 1929 (aged 43); Hartford, Connecticut, US
- Burial place: Mount Saint Benedict Cemetery, Bloomfield, Connecticut
- Military career
- Allegiance: United States of America
- Branch: United States Navy
- Rank: Machinist's Mate Second Class
- Unit: USS Pampanga
- Conflicts: Moro Rebellion; Philippine–American War
- Awards: Medal of Honor

George Francis Henrechon (November 22, 1885 – August 16, 1929) was a United States Navy sailor who received the Medal of Honor for actions during the Moro Rebellion in the Philippine–American War.

He is buried at Mount Saint Benedict Cemetery, Bloomfield, Connecticut.

== Medal of Honor citation ==
Rank and organization: Machinist's Mate Second Class, U.S. Navy. Born: November 22, 1885, Hartford, Conn. Accredited to: California. G.O. No.: 138, December 13, 1911

Citation:

While attached to the USS Pampanga, Henrechon was one of a shore party moving in to capture Mundang, Philippine Islands, on 24 September 1911. Ordered to take station within 100 yards of a group of nipa huts close to the trail, Henrechon advanced and stood guard as the leader and his scout party first searched the surrounding deep grasses, then moved into the open area before the huts. Instantly enemy Moros opened point-blank fire on the exposed men and approximately 20 Moros rushed the small group from inside the huts and from other concealed positions. Henrechon, responding to the calls for help, was one of the first on the scene. When his rifle jammed after the first shot, he closed in with rifle, using it as a club to break the stock over the head of the nearest Moro and then, drawing his pistol, started in pursuit of the fleeing outlaws. Henrechon's aggressive charging of the enemy under heavy fire and in the face of great odds contributed materially to the success of the engagement.

== See also ==
- List of Medal of Honor recipients
- List of Philippine–American War Medal of Honor recipients
