= Henry C. Mustin (1874–1923) =

US Navy Aviator

Henry Croskey Mustin
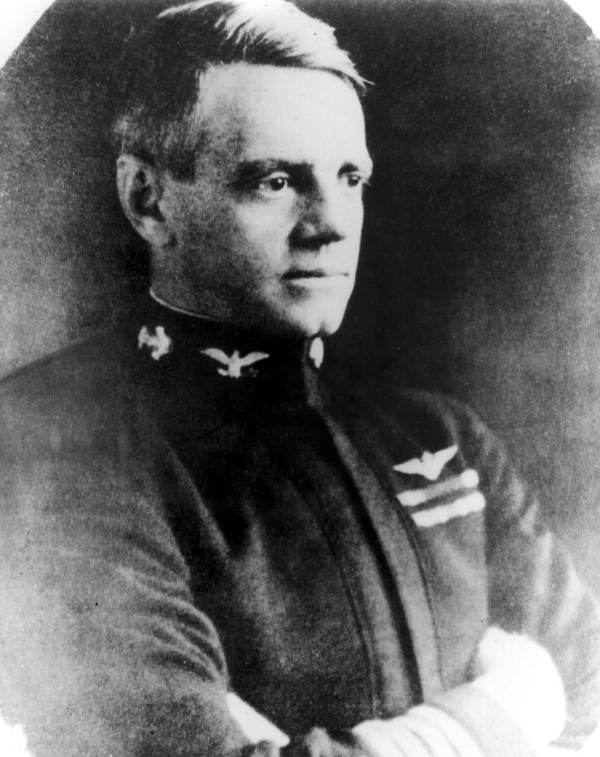
- Captain Henry C. Mustin
- Born: 6 February 1874; Philadelphia, Pennsylvania, U.S.
- Died: August 23, 1923 (aged 49); Newport, Rhode Island, U.S.
- Burial place: Arlington National Cemetery, Arlington, Virginia
- Spouse: Corinne DeForest Montague
- Military career
- Allegiance: United States of America
- Branch: United States Navy
- Service years: 1892–1923
- Rank: Captain
- Nickname: "Rum"
- Commands: USS Samar (PG-41); Naval Air Station Pensacola; USS Mississippi (BB-23); USS Aroostook (CM-3); Fleet Air Detachment, United States Pacific Fleet
- Conflicts: Spanish–American War; Philippine Insurrection; United States occupation of Veracruz; World War I
- Awards: Gold Life Saving Medal

Henry Croskey Mustin (6 February 1874 – 23 August 1923) was a pioneering naval aviator who undertook the task of establishing the first Naval Aeronautic Station (now Naval Air Station Pensacola) on the site of the abandoned Navy Yard at Warrington, Florida, in 1914. He was designated Navy Air Pilot No. 3 and later Naval Aviator No. 11. Two U.S. Navy destroyers have borne the name Mustin in honor of Captain Mustin and his descendants, three of whom have served as flag officers.

== Early life and career ==
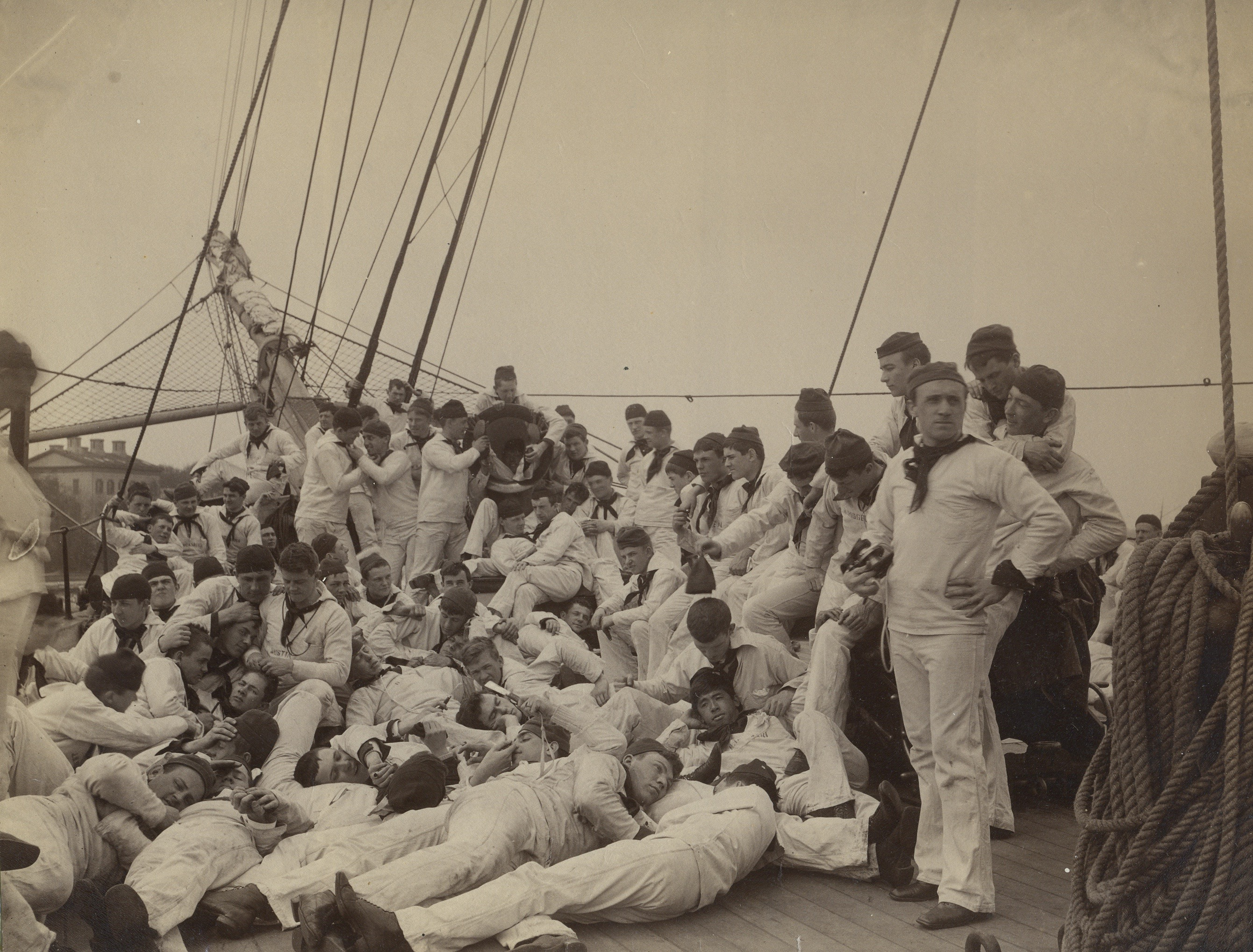
U.S. Naval Academy midshipmen skylarking aboard USS Essex, 1893. Midshipman Henry Mustin is in the foreground on the left.

Born in Philadelphia, Mustin graduated from the United States Naval Academy in 1896. He spent two years at sea, as required by law, before he was commissioned an ensign. From then until he reported to duty in aviation 15 years later, he distinguished himself as a remarkably capable officer in the surface navy.

After receiving his commission, Mustin served during the next 18 months on board six different ships. From October 1899 to March 1900, he served as commanding officer of USS Samar, a gunboat on the Asiatic Station. While commanding Samar, during the capture of Vigan in the Philippine Islands, Mustin won a commendation for towing the boats of the battleship USS Oregon to shore and aiding in covering the landing. After a night of carousing in May 1900, Mustin was court-martialed for leaving his station and sleeping on watch, resulting in the loss of five numbers in grade. The court martial reconvened to pardon him, and he eventually had his numbers restored by President Theodore Roosevelt, who heard that Mustin had punched a British sailor for insulting the U.S. Navy during the night in question.

Mustin was also interested in the technical aspects of naval artillery and helped develop a telescopic sight that would aid in increasing the accuracy and range of naval gunnery. He made his first flight while on duty at the Philadelphia Navy Yard. In January 1911, he aided Holden C. Richardson in an experiment with a glider, which Richardson designed and built. Mustin soloed on 13 March 1913.

== Naval Aeronautic Station ==
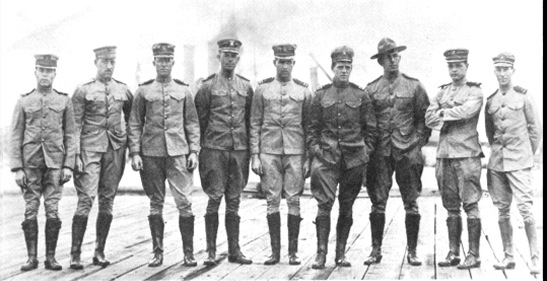
The detachment of naval officers who established the Naval Aeronautic Station at Pensacola, Florida. Henry Mustin is fourth from right.

In 1913, plans for a national naval air service were taking shape, and Pensacola, Florida, was chosen over Annapolis, Maryland, as the site of a training facility, as the warmer weather along the United States Gulf Coast would be better for year-round flying. On 31 December 1913, Mustin reported for duty as executive officer of USS Mississippi, a battleship being sent to Pensacola Bay for training purposes. On 6 January 1914, under a new ranking system for officers, Mustin was designated Navy Air Pilot No. 3 (after Theodore G. Ellyson and John H. Towers). A detachment of nine officers and about two dozen enlisted men arrived at Pensacola on 20 January and began to establish the new school. It was operational by February. Mustin and his wife and two sons, Lloyd and Henry, moved into Quarters A on the station.

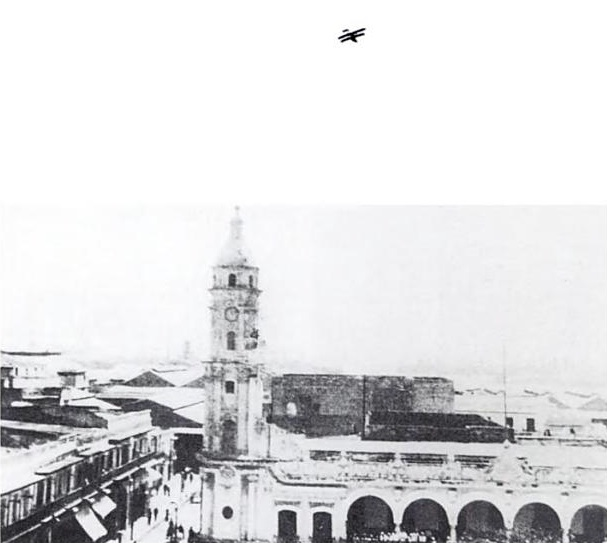
U.S. Navy aircraft over Veracruz, Mexico, in 1914.

Following the Tampico Affair on 9 April 1914, the United States sent a squadron of warships to Veracruz, Mexico. After first sending three planes to Veracruz aboard the light cruiser USS Birmingham, Lieutenant Commander Mustin took temporary command of Mississippi as her acting captain and led a second aviation detachment, along with 500 United States Marines, aboard her to the campaign. They arrived at Veracruz on the evening of 24 April 1914. The United States occupation of Veracruz marked both the first operational use of naval aircraft and the first time that any U.S. aviator of any service was the target of ground fire. Mississippi began her voyage back to Pensacola on 12 June 1914 to make repairs to the aircraft which had seen continued use without means of maintenance. In July 1914, Mustin took Mississippi to Norfolk, Virginia, to be sold to Greece.

Washington Post Article

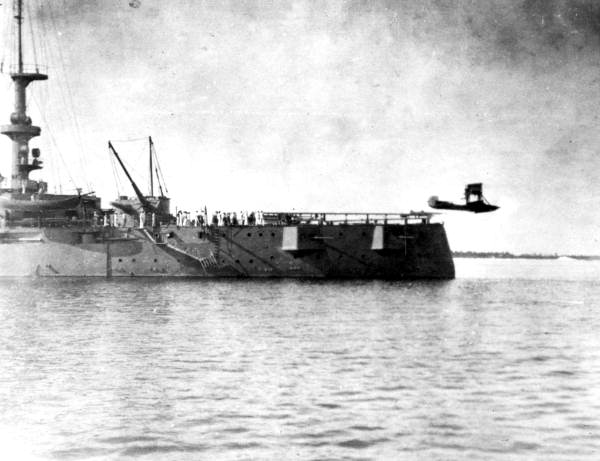
Mustin makes the first catapult launch on 5 November 1915.

Mustin was named commandant of the Naval Aeronautic Station in April 1915. With USD $1 million in funding for the year, the station conducted antisubmarine patrols, worked on the development of a new bombsight and a gyroscopic sextant, and saw the arrival of ten new students in July 1915. A new station ship, the armored cruiser USS North Carolina, arrived in Pensacola on 9 September 1915. On 5 November 1915, Mustin launched himself from North Carolina via catapult in a Curtiss Model AB-2, recording both the world's first catapulting of an aircraft from a ship and the first takeoff from a ship underway. Actually, the first takeoff from a ship underway was by the Royal Navy's Commander Charles Rumney Samson from HMS Hibernia in May 1912, three and a half years earlier. The RN used a ramp for launch, while the US developed a catapult launch system.

Mustin was outspoken about the potential of naval aviation, despite conclusions by officials that "aeronautics does not offer a prospect of becoming the principal means of exercising compelling force against the enemy." He lobbied to halt funding of dirigible projects and focus development on high-speed fighter aircraft. He and fellow naval aviator Kenneth Whiting worked together on seaplane designs and filed a patent application for the design of a "hydroaeroplane" on 27 October 1916. However, the hurricane that struck Pensacola on 18 October 1916 caused more than $1 million in damage to the base, and Mustin faced accusations that his "wrong flying instruction methods" had caused the deaths of two naval aviators, Lieutenants, junior grade, Richard C. Saufley and James V. Rockwell – developments that greatly dampened plans for the Aeronautic Station. He was detached from Pensacola on 31 January 1917 and, as then customary, his Naval Aviator designation was revoked simultaneously. While he returned to sea duty, Mustin ultimately was promoted and restored to aviation command.

== Later career ==
On 15 January 1918, Mustin, then executive officer of the battleship USS North Dakota, saved the life of a sailor who was washed overboard, earning him the Gold Life Saving Medal. However, the effort took a heavy toll on his health, from which he never entirely recovered. Mustin began development of a "sea sled" carrier vessel that year, conducting tests from November 1918 to March 1919. The armistice with Germany and end of World War I on 11 November 1918 ended Mustin's sea sled development, although it would be revived during World War II and praised for its ingenuity.

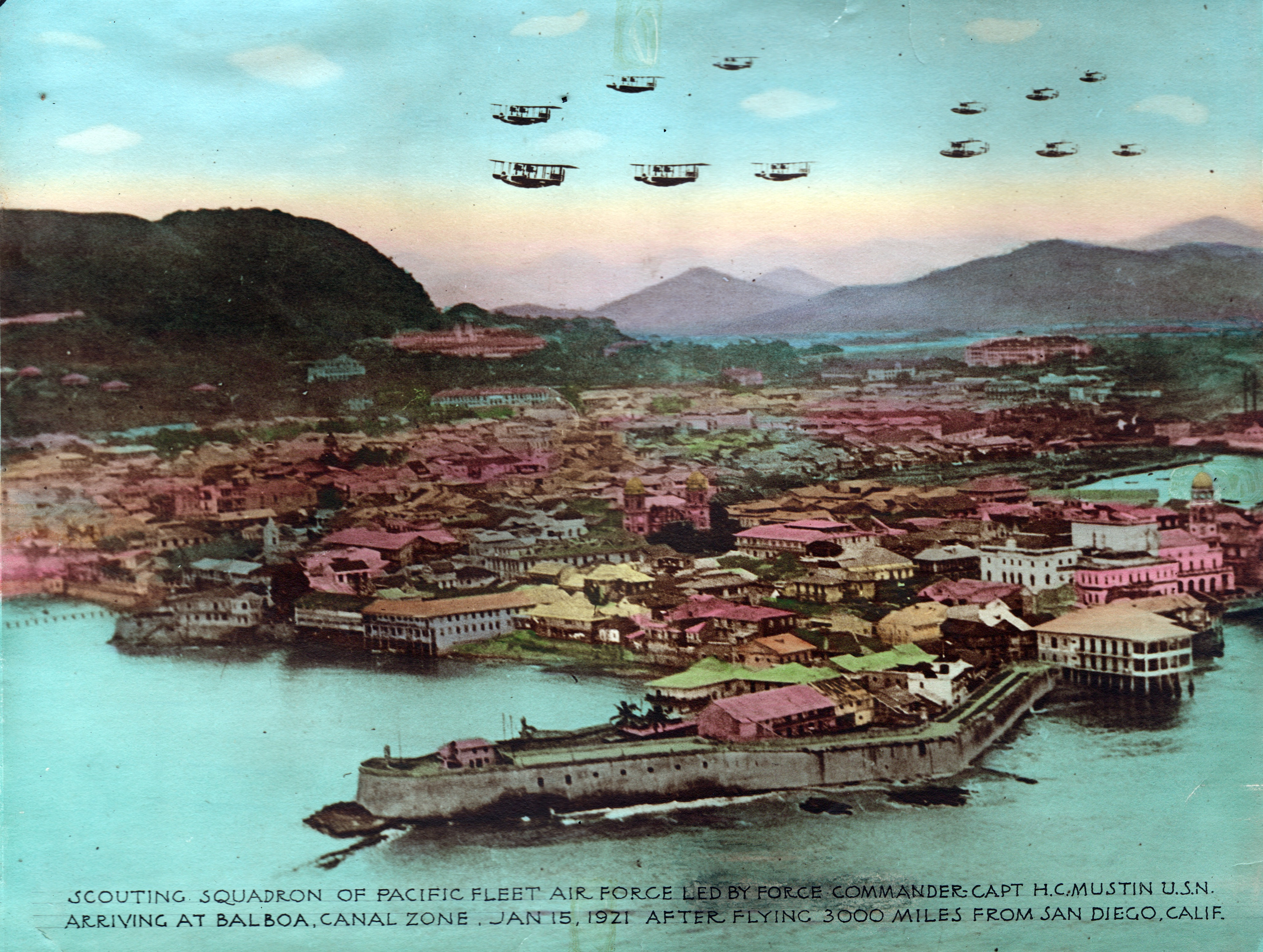

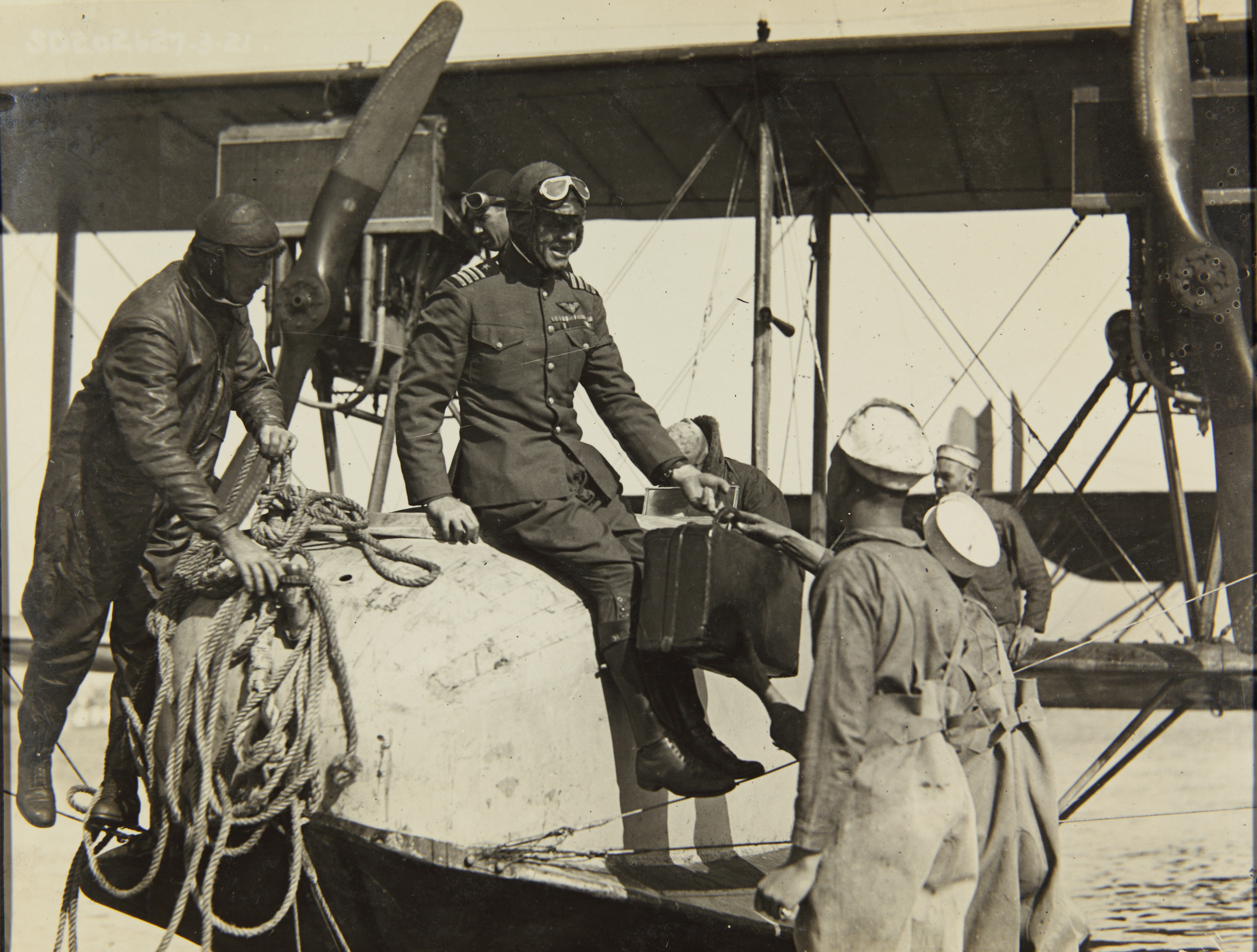
Captain Mustin's Return from Panama

In December 1919, Commander Mustin assumed command of the minelayer USS Aroostook with additional duty as commander, Air Detachment, United States Pacific Fleet. While in command of the Air Detachment, later designated Aircraft Squadrons, Pacific Fleet, Mustin led a flight of a dozen airplanes on a record breaking 3,019 mile flight from San Diego, California, to Balboa, Panama. Mustin was ordered to report to the United States Department of the Navy for duty as its first Assistant Chief, Bureau of Aeronautics in late October 1921, reporting for duty there on 6 November 1921. He was promoted to captain on 1 January 1922.

== Death ==
Captain Mustin was admitted to the National Naval Medical Center in Bethesda, Maryland, in January 1923 suffering from chest pain. After a protracted illness lasting several months, he died at Newport, Rhode Island, on 23 August 1923. He was buried at Arlington National Cemetery in Arlington, Virginia.

After Captain Mustin's death his widow, Corinne, married naval aviator George D. Murray who had lost his wife in 1920.

== Family ==
Captain Mustin married Corinne DeForest Montague, great-granddaughter of Commodore Arthur Sinclair, and a first cousin and close confidante of Wallis Simpson who became involved in a controversial relationship with King Edward VIII of Great Britain who abdicated to marry her in 1936. The Mustins had three children Lloyd M., Henry A., and Gordon S.

His son, Vice Admiral Lloyd M. Mustin, was a 1932 graduate of the U.S. Naval Academy who took part in developing the Navy's first lead-computing antiaircraft gun sight. This proved of major importance in the air-sea actions of World War II. VADM Mustin served on the cruiser USS Atlanta during the battle of Guadalcanal. His ship was lost, but he and other survivors landed on Guadalcanal and served ashore with a naval unit attached to the First Marine Division. His postwar service included commands at sea and development and evaluation of weapon systems. VADM Mustin later served as director of operations for the Joint Chiefs of Staff. Another of Captain Mustin's sons, Henry A. Mustin, served in the U.S. Navy as a lieutenant commander during World War II.

Captain Mustin's grandsons, retired Navy Vice Admiral Henry Croskey Mustin II, and Lieutenant Commander Thomas M. Mustin, continued their family's legacy of service in the U.S. Navy. Vice Admiral Mustin, a 1955 graduate of the U.S. Naval Academy, was a destroyerman who served at sea in both the Atlantic and Pacific fleets, and ashore with the Delta River Patrol Group during the Vietnam War. In the 1980s he served as the Naval Inspector General, Commander Second Fleet, and Deputy Chief of Naval Operations for Plans and Policy. Lieutenant Commander Mustin, a 1962 Naval Academy graduate, earned a Bronze Star during the Vietnam War for river patrol combat action.

Two of Captain Mustin's great-grandsons, Captain Lloyd M. Mustin II and Vice Admiral John B. Mustin, a 1990 graduate of the U.S. Naval Academy, served in the U.S. Navy. Lloyd retired in 2015. After serving on active duty, John served in the Navy Reserve, mobilizing to active duty service as the commanding officer of Inshore Boat Unit 22, deployed to Kuwait, from 2004 to 2005. He was selected for promotion to rear admiral (lower half) in March 2016. He served as the 15th chief of the Navy Reserve from 2020 to 2024, when he retired.

Another great-grandson, Tom Mustin, worked as an actor and is known for his roles in Star Trek IV: The Voyage Home (1986), Death Dreams (1991) and Mad at the Moon (1992). He later became a TV news reporter and is currently a news anchor on CBS4 in Denver, Colorado.

Captain Mustin's great-great-grandson, Link Mustin, a 2006 graduate of Hampden-Sydney College, is currently an officer in the US Navy.

== Commemoration ==
The U.S. Navy destroyer USS Mustin (DD-413) was named for Captain Mustin. The U.S. Navy guided-missile destroyer USS Mustin (DDG-89), is named for the Mustin family.

At Naval Air Station Pensacola – the former Naval Aeronautic Station – Mustin Beach is named for him and the Mustin Beach Officer's Club indirectly bears his name. Also named for Mustin was the Henry C. Mustin Naval Air Facility, which operated at the Philadelphia Navy Yard from 1926 to 1963.

Mustin was inducted into the Naval Aviation Hall of Honor at the National Naval Aviation Museum in Pensacola in 1990.

== See also ==
- Mustin family
