= USS Paragua =

Gunboat of the United States Navy

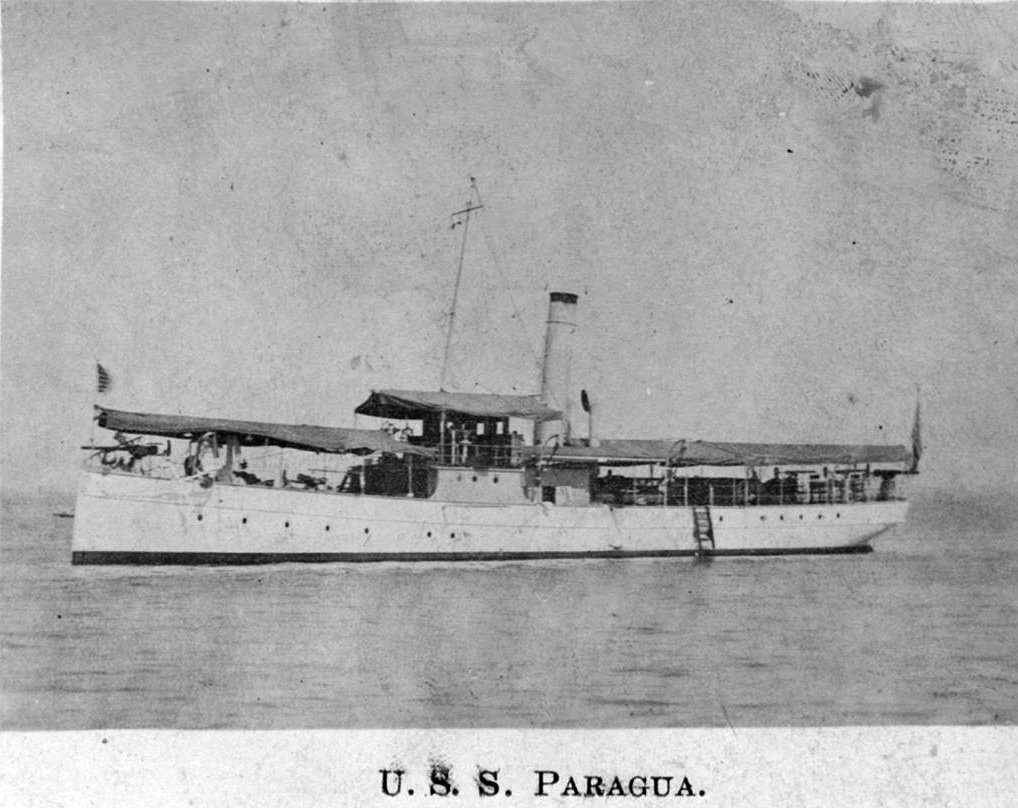

History

Spain
- Name: Paragua
- Builder: Manila Ship Company, Cavite, Philippines
- Laid down: March 1887
- Launched: January 1888
- Home port: Manila, Philippines
- Fate: Purchased by a private American syndicate in 1898.

United States
- Name: USS Paragua
- Namesake: The pre-1905 name for the Philippine island of Palawan
- Acquired: Acquired by U.S. Navy by purchase 29 May 1899
- Commissioned: 29 May 1899
- Decommissioned: 19 April 1911 at Cavite, Philippines
- Home port: Philippine Islands
- Fate: Sold 18 November 1912

General characteristics
- Type: Gunboat
- Displacement: 243 long tons (247 t)
- Length: 121 ft (37 m)
- Beam: 17 ft 10 in (5.44 m)
- Draft: 7 ft 6 in (2.29 m)
- Speed: 10 knots (19 km/h; 12 mph)
- Complement: 30 officers and enlisted
- Armament: 1 × 6-pounder gun; 3 × 3-pounder guns

USS Paragua was a schooner-rigged iron gunboat in the United States Navy during the Philippine–American War. Paragua was one of four Arayat class gunboats built by the Manila Ship Co. for the Spanish navy in 1887–88. Her sister ships were the USS Samar (PG-41), USS Pampanga (PG-39) and USS Arayat.

Arayat, Samar, Pampanga and Paragua all were 243 tons. Samar was the first completed in 1887 and was 116 ft, while the other three, built at the same time in 1887–88, were 121 ft long. They were a scaled down design based on the larger El Cano at 620 tons and 166 ft that had been built in Spain. The primary design criterion was a shallower draft, seven feet or less, and length, in order to better adapt to the shallow reefs and rivers of the Philippines. For their small size, the boats were quite fast, maneuverable, and heavily armed.

Paragua was laid down for the Spanish Navy by the Manila Ship Company, Cavite, Philippine Islands, in March 1887 and launched in January 1888. She was named for the island of Palawan, known as Paragua prior to 1905. When the Spanish–American War broke out in April 1898, Paragua was part of the Spanish Pacific Fleet based at Manila, Philippines Paragua was one of ten gunboats put up for sale in early 1899 by the Spanish navy at its former base on the southern island of Basilan following the signing of the Treaty of Paris that ended the Spanish–American War. The gunboats were purchased by a syndicate of private individuals put together by General Elwell Otis, the U.S. Army commander, in order to prevent their being acquired by the Philippine Revolutionary government. The Army bought the ships from the syndicate and then sold them to the U.S. Navy in early May 1899. Paragua was commissioned on 29 May 1899, Ensign W.C. Davidson, commanding.

== Service history ==
Paragua was in continuous service from 1899 to 1911, other than from August 1902 until early 1904, when she and several other gunboats were placed out of commission during a reduction of the Asiatic Station. Most of Paragua's service, other than the first two years she was in commission, was spent patrolling in southern Philippine waters. On 13 September 1899, Paragua, engaged insurgents at Baleno, Masbate, south of Luzon and north of Visayas that were directing rifle-fire at the ship from a range of 400–900 yards. The attack was silenced in 20 minutes and Paragua captured and destroyed a Filipino schooner. On 14 September 1899, Paragua engaged about 300 rifle-firing insurgents heavily entrenched at a distance of 700–1,000 yards at the northern Philippine town of San Fabian, Pangasinan, on Lingayen Gulf. Aside from repelling shore based attacks from insurgents, in the first few years of the 20th century, Paragua and her sister ships performed interdiction and blockade duty to intercept smugglers of cargo and humans in the shallow waters and shoals of the Western Visayas region and in particular, between Iloilo on the southeast side of Panay and Guimaras, Negros and Romblon. Paragua also provided naval gunfire support, reconnaissance and transported U.S. Army troops battling the insurgency in the southern Philippine islands.

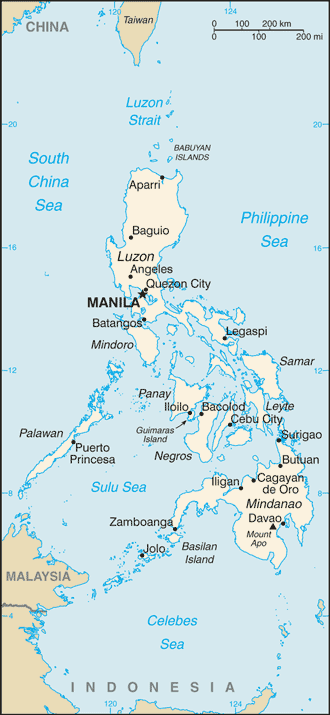
Map of Philippines

In 1901, Paragua and her sister ship, Samar, were operating out of the U.S. Naval Station at Cebu. In July 1901, Paragua and other gunboats assisted the army in establishing 20 garrisons at Samar Island by ascending the rivers to penetrate the island which had no roads. On 12 July 1902, Secretary of the Navy William Henry Moody ordered Read Admiral Frank Wildes, commander of the Asiatic Station to place six gunboats, including Paragua out of commission as part of a force reduction.

Paragua, Ensign Charles S. Kerrick, commanding, was recommissioned in 1904 as part of the Philippine Squadron of the Asiatic Fleet. Along with her sister ships, USS Samar (PG-41) and USS Pampanga (PG-39), Paragua's home base was at Parang on the island of Mindanao on the Moro Gulf near the city of Cotabato and Illana Bay. Paragua's main duties continued to be suppression of piracy, gun-running, banditry and slave-trading, as well as providing support and transportation for the U.S. Army and Philippine Constabulary in quelling the ongoing insurgency in the southern Philippine islands, known as the Moro Rebellion.

In the beginning of 1905, Paragua, Pampanaga and Samar worked in cooperation with the U.S. Army to suppress an uprising in the Rio Grande Valley on Mindanao. During March and April 1905, under the direction of the governor of the Moro Province, army Major General Leonard Wood, Paragua with the assistance of several army launches patrolled the coast of Jolo "while suppressing insurrection on that island." Moro is the Spanish word for "Moor". The Islamic Moros were of medium height, robust and fearless warriors. With a love of the brightest colors, the men wore pantaloons skin-tight below the knee, colorful shirts and tunics, capped with vivid turbans and earrings of metal and seashells. For working or when expecting a fight, their pants were loose. The women wore similar loose pants, with or without skirts and tight-fighting jackets often open. They were "born warriors" and the steel weapons which they superbly crafted and had wielded with lightning speed and lethal dexterity for centuries, resulted in the formerly occupying Spanish generally leaving them alone to engage with relative impunity in piracy and robbing other tribes. Their razor-sharp, two-handed sword known as a barong could cleave a head in a stroke. For thrusting, they used the deadly kris, a straight stiletto-type knife notable for its often wavy steel blade. For hacking, they used the campilan, a long machete, carried in a sheath of two wood strips bound with a ring, where in a split-second the striking blow cut the ring to free the weapon and slice the victim. They sometimes wore coats of mail crafted from metal wire and carabao horn, carried shields and wore helmets of brass. The juramentados, or "sworn men" had taken solemn oaths to die while taking the blood of Christians, believing their reward was an enhanced afterlife.

Paragua participated in the Third Sulu Expedition (1–13 May 1905) commanded by Major General Wood, and joined the expedition on 9 May at the "blasted crater", a dormant, 1,200-foot volcano so-called because the seaward wall of the crater was blown out. The crater was situated on the southeast coast of Jolo Island and was the stronghold of Datu Hatai, a Moro chieftain who had built a cottas, an earth and wood fortress, where he and about 400 of his followers were camped, including about 100 warriors. The mission of the expedition had been to penalize several reluctant datus that resisted paying the cedula or head tax, that Wood had assessed to fund a number of his improvement projects.

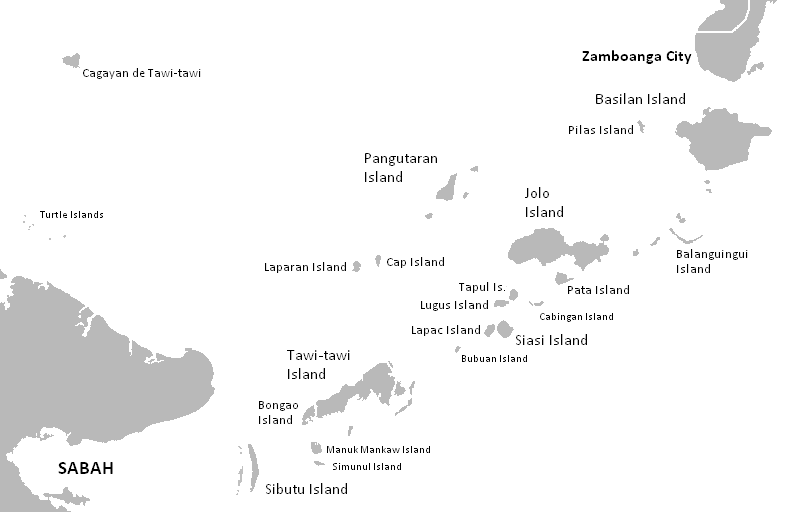
Map of Sulu Archipelago

On the way to join Wood's army troops at the crater to provide shore support, by chance Paragua encountered two of the five torpedo boat destroyers of the Asiatic Fleet Torpedo Boat Destroyer Flotilla, USS Barry (DD-2) and USS Chauncey (DD-3). This was during the Russo-Japanese War and at a time when the president Roosevelt had issued a proclamation of neutrality. Following the departure of the Russian Baltic Fleet to the east, the Destroyer Flotilla had been sent south to patrol the coast of Palawan and the waters north of Borneo and otherwise cooperate with Paragua and the other gunboats of the Philippine Squadron that were patrolling south of Mindanao. Barry and Chauncey were responding to reports that several Russian warships had entered Philippine territorial waters without authorization while steaming north to China. Kerrick convinced the destroyer captains to divert course to Jolo to add more firepower. On 8 May, both destroyers, along with Paragua and the U.S. Army steam yacht Sabah were underway for Jolo. Arriving at Jolo, there was an overnight standoff while negotiations were made for a surrender. The destroyers played their searchlights into the crater the entire night. While the threat of a shore bombardment likely played a part in Datu Hatai's surrender the following morning, thereby avoiding a bloodbath, the normally fearless Moros were likely unnerved by the bright "devil eyes" of these strange lights illuminating their lair throughout the night. The Philippine coast guard cutter Tablas was also involved in the expedition.

The next day, 11 May, ninety soldiers of the U.S. Army's 17th Infantry Regiment came aboard Paragua to take passage to Pata Island. Paragua escorted Sabah, carrying companies of the 17th Infantry and 14th Cavalry to confront another datu thought to be hostile. At about 1 pm, Paragua anchored off Pata and landed the soldiers, along with a landing party of nine bluejackets commanded by Paragua's executive officer, Passed Midshipman Allen B. Reed and a navy M1895 Colt-Browning machine gun. When confronted by U.S. forces, Datu Haramain did not resist, and all but the provisional company (about 100 men) of the 17th Infantry, commanded by army Lieutenant Horace P. Hobbs, were moved back to Jolo on the Sabah while Paragua remained at Pata with the army provisional company. However, they were attacked by 68 warriors led by a tribal holy man named Tungalang, who had given them oils to rub on their bodies in the tragic belief that it would make them invincible to bullets. They were all killed in their assault without any casualties on the American side. Midshipman Reed directed part of the firing line during the attack on Pata, though he was unarmed having given his sidearm to a soldier whose rifle jammed. Reed also acted as signal officer for the provisional company of the 17th Infantry by having two or three of his sailors manning signal flags. The Colt machine-gun crew returned to Paragua about 10 pm that night. After the action, Paragua conveyed the 17th Infantry back to Jolo.

In June 1905, uprising in Samar became severe enough that suppression efforts were put under U.S. Army control. Paragua and five other gunboats were ordered to Samar to cooperate with Army General William H. Carter. Accompanying the navy gunboats were two 60 ton steam launches, armed with 1-pounder Mark 6 guns and Colt machine guns. Passed Midshipman Reed commanded one of the steam launches that operated in the small rivers on the west coast of Samar that were unnavigable for the larger gunboats. In the quarterly fitness report for Passed Midshipman Reed that Ensign Kerrick completed and submitted to the U.S. Naval Academy, he wrote, "In command of a 60 ton steam launch on patrol for two weeks and did excellent work. Also with landing party assisting Army in Jolo. Mentioned by commanding officer of expedition in his report for coolness and good judgment on firing line." Major General Wood commended Kerrick and Paragua, writing in his report: "the gunboat Paragua cooperated most efficiently with the land forces and rendered valuable assistance, not only in transporting troops, but in patrolling the coast, and by so doing aiding in the capture of the various positions." This was two weeks before the Battle of Tsushima Straits in which the Japanese navy destroyed the Russian Far East fleet and established the Empire of Japan as a world force to be reckoned with, altering the balance of power in the Pacific. This eventually led to the Japanese War Scare of 1906-07 that in turn led to the mothballing of most of the mosquito fleet in mid-1906 for more than a year and the return of its officers to the larger ships of the Asiatic Fleet.

Following commissioning as an ensign on 2 February 1906, Reed commanded Paragua from 3 February – 14 December 1906. Paragua, operating out of the naval station at Cavite, continued patrolling the waters of the Philippine Islands. The Navy provided active coastal support in the Philippine archipelago through the accomplishment of pacification and beyond. The Report of the Secretary of the Navy commented favorably upon the valuable services rendered by small gunboats such as Paragua as an example of inter-service cooperation. As Rear Admiral Charles J. Train, commander of the Asiatic Fleet wrote in his report to the Secretary of the Navy: "The work of these gunboats was of great assistance to the Army in transporting troops, in landing armed parties, in patrolling the coast, and in penetrating the interior up the small streams. A number of commendatory letters have been received from officers of the Army testifying to the great assistance rendered by these gunboats and destroyers and to the praiseworthy conduct of the officers and men." In September 1910, Paragua was at the ready over concern that another Boxer Rebellion might erupt in China, a fear that did not come to pass. The following year, Paragua was placed out of commission for the second and final time.

Among U.S. Naval officers at the turn of the 20th century, the command of a small gunboat during the Philippine Insurrection was considered a choice assignment due to the likelihood of engagement and the autonomy of generally choosing patrol routes and ports of call. Such noted World War II admirals as William Leahy, Chester Nimitz, William "Bull" Halsey and John S. McCain, Sr. all were first or second in command of patrol gunboats in the Philippines very early in their careers. Admiral Frederick J. Horne, who was Vice Chief of Naval Operations and directed all navy logistics during World War II served on Paragua while a passed midshipman as did Rear Admiral Yates Stirling Jr. who commanded Paragua as a lieutenant from December 1900 – December 1901. In his book Faith of My Fathers, Senator John McCain wrote of an interview he conducted in the 1950s as a midshipman at the Naval Academy with retired Admiral Chester Nimitz, who was then in his 70s. While McCain wanted to learn about the World War II experience of his grandfather, Admiral John S. McCain, Sr., the younger McCain recalled that all Nimitz wanted to talk about were the adventures that he and McCain's grandfather, his executive officer on USS Panay had together in 1907, while chasing pirates in the Moro Gulf and visiting ports freely as they chose. Nimitz considered it the best time of his entire navy career.
