= Stour-class destroyer =

Class overview
- Name: Stour class destroyer
- Builders: Cammell Laird, Birkenhead
- Operators: Royal Navy
- Built: 1904–1905
- In commission: 1909–1919
- Completed: 2
- Retired: 2

General characteristics
- Displacement: 550 long tons (560 t) standard
- Length: 67.1 m (220 ft 2 in)
- Beam: 7.2 m (23 ft 7 in)
- Draught: 2.7 m (8 ft 10 in)
- Installed power: 7,000 ihp (5,200 kW)
- Propulsion: 2 × Parsons steam turbines, 2 shafts
- Speed: 25.5 knots (47.2 km/h; 29.3 mph)
- Complement: 70
- Armament: 4 × QF 12-pounder 12 cwt Mark I, mounting P Mark I; 5 × single 6-pdr Hotchkiss 57 mm (2.2 in) guns; 2 × single tubes for 18-inch (450mm) torpedoes

Two Stour class destroyers served with the Royal Navy. They were built by Cammell Laird in 1905 and purchased by the Admiralty in 1909 to replace losses. HMS Stour and HMS Test displaced 570 tons, were 220 feet long and their Normand boilers generated 7,000 HP to produce 26 knots. They were armed with four twelve pounders and two torpedo tubes. They carried 134 tons of coal and 66 tons of oil. They served in home waters during the Great War and were sold off in 1919.
