= USS Hovey =

Clemson-class destroyer

Coordinates: 16°20′N 120°10′E

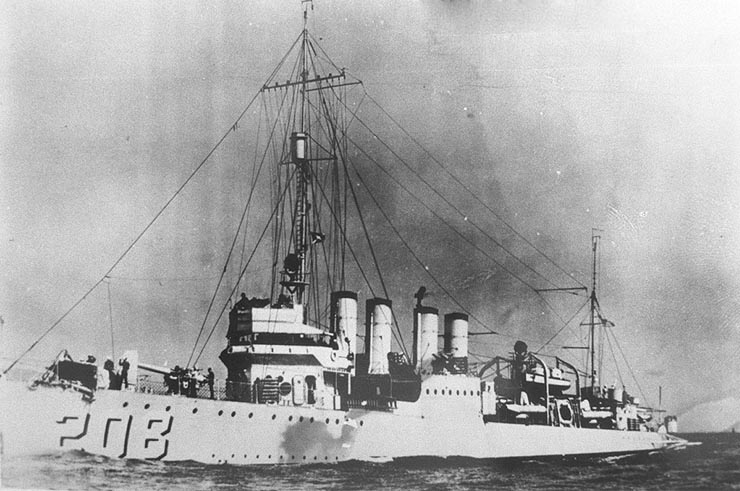
- USS Hovey

History

United States
- Name: Hovey
- Namesake: Charles Hovey
- Builder: William Cramp & Sons, Philadelphia
- Yard number: 474
- Laid down: 18 August 1918
- Launched: 31 March 1919
- Commissioned: 24 September 1919
- Decommissioned: 1 February 1923
- Recommissioned: 20 February 1930
- Reclassified: Destroyer minesweeper, DMS-11, 19 November 1940
- Stricken: 8 January 1946
- Fate: Sunk 7 January 1945

General characteristics
- Class & type: Clemson-class destroyer
- Displacement: 1,190 tons
- Length: 314 ft 4 in (95.8 m)
- Beam: 31 ft 8 in (9.7 m)
- Draft: 9 ft 3 in (2.8 m)
- Propulsion: 26,500 shp (19,800 kW); Geared turbines, 2 screws
- Speed: 35 knots (65 km/h; 40 mph)
- Range: 4,900 nmi (9,100 km; 5,600 mi) at 15 knots (28 km/h; 17 mph)
- Complement: 167 officers and enlisted
- Armament: 4 × 2 4"/50 caliber guns, 1 × 3 in (76 mm) gun, 12 × 21-inch (533 mm) torpedo tubes.

USS Hovey (DD-208/DMS-11) was a Clemson-class destroyer in the United States Navy during World War II. She was the only ship named for Ensign Charles Hovey (1885–1911).

== Construction and commissioning ==
Hovey was launched 26 April 1919 by William Cramp & Sons, Philadelphia; sponsored by Mrs. Louise F. Kautz, sister of Ensign Hovey; and commissioned 2 October 1919. She was one of only a few Clemson class destroyers armed with four twin Mk 14 4-inch guns. These were removed in 1940.

== Service history ==
=== 1919-1940 ===
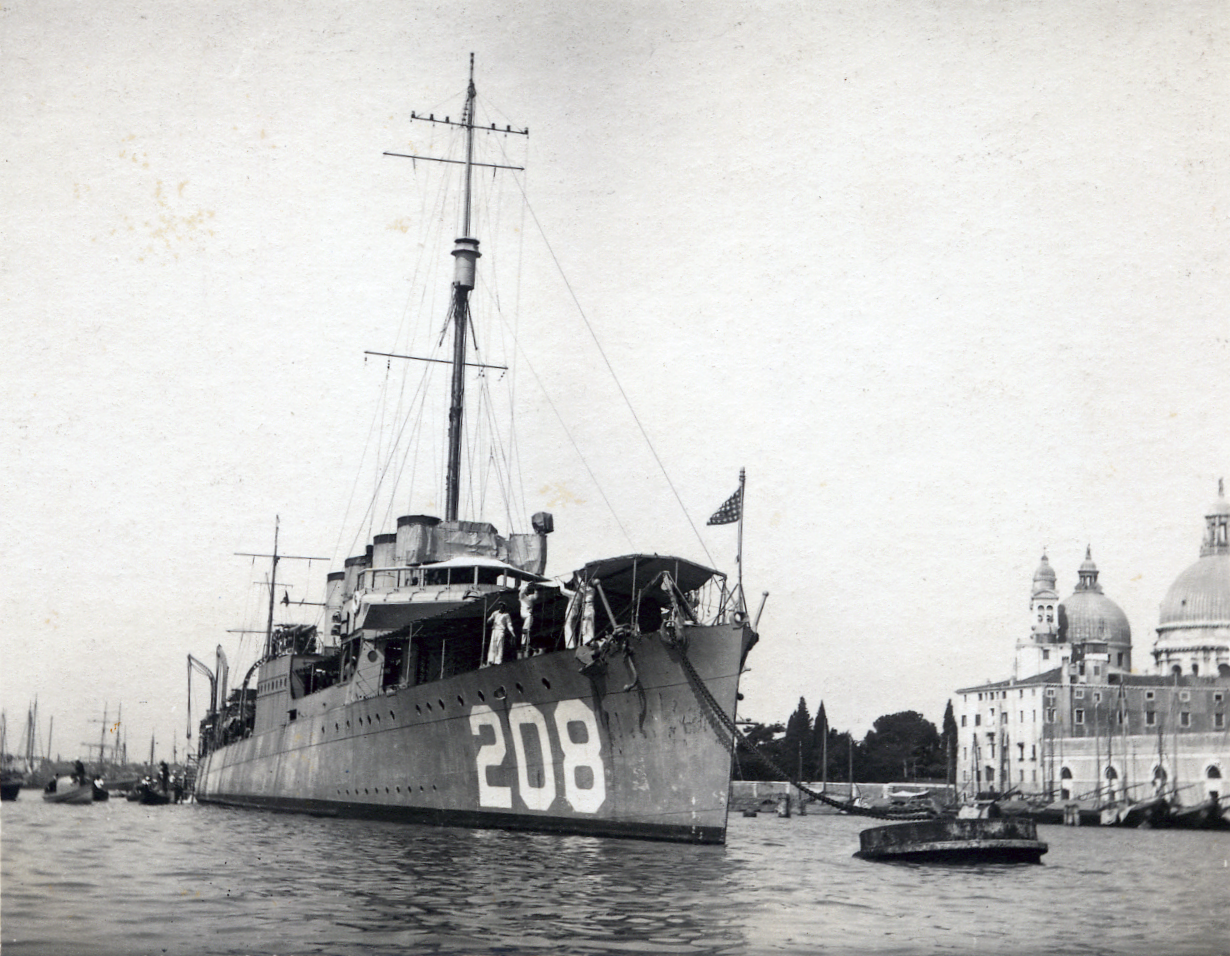
Hovey in port at Venice, Italy on 14 June 1920

After shakedown off the coast of Florida and in the Caribbean, Hovey sailed from Newport, Rhode Island 19 December 1919 in company with Chandler for the Azores and Brest, France, for duty as station ship. She sailed from Dalmatia, Italy on 10 July 1920 for the Adriatic Sea to deliver important papers and claims. Arriving Constantinople on 12 July she later visited various Russian ports as station ship until 17 December when she sailed for Port Said, Egypt, and duty with the Asiatic Fleet in the Philippines. Hovey remained on the Asiatic station until she returned to San Francisco, California 2 October 1922, decommissioning at San Diego on 1 February 1923.

Hovey recommissioned on 20 February 1930 at San Diego, California. After shakedown out of San Diego and Mare Island she served principally as training ship for reservists until 9 April 1934 when she transited the Panama Canal, arriving at New York on 31 May. After training and fleet exercises out of New England and off the Florida coast, Hovey returned to San Diego on 9 November. After overhaul at Mare Island, she resumed her operations along the United States West Coast with additional exercises and fleet problems in the Canal Zone and Hawaiian waters.

George Thomas Sullivan and Francis Henry Sullivan, two of the five Sullivan Brothers served aboard Hovey.

=== World War II ===
Hovey converted to a destroyer minesweeper and was reclassified DMS-11 on 19 November 1940. After intensive training she sailed on 4 February 1941 for duty at Pearl Harbor. When the Japanese bombed Pearl Harbor 7 December 1941 Hovey was steaming in company with Chandler as antisubmarine screen for the cruiser Minneapolis, engaged in gunnery practice some 20 nautical miles (37 km; 23 mi) off Pearl Harbor. The minesweeper immediately took up patrol and convoy duty around Pearl Harbor until 20 May when she escorted a 20-ship convoy to San Francisco, arriving on 31 May. Hovey returned to Pearl Harbor in mid-June and sailed on 10 July for the southwest Pacific escorting Argonne . She reached the Fiji Islands on 23 July and joined Minesweeping Group of Rear Admiral Richmond K. Turner's South Pacific Amphibious Force on 31 July.

==== Solomon Islands campaign ====
On 7 August, during the invasion of Guadalcanal, the first amphibious assault in the long island-hopping campaign, Hovey was assigned a screening station for the transports. Then, shortly before 0800, she took a bombardment station to cover the landings east of Gavutu. Japanese shore batteries opened up but were quickly silenced by accurate fire from Hovey and the other ships providing fire support. She next joined other destroyer minesweepers for sweeps between Gavutu and Bungana Islands. The next morning she steamed into Lengo Channel to help ward off an attack by a squadron of torpedo bombers. Intensive US anti-aircraft fire caused the Japanese planes to drop their torpedoes prematurely and hence at too great a range, thereby rendering the attack almost totally ineffective.

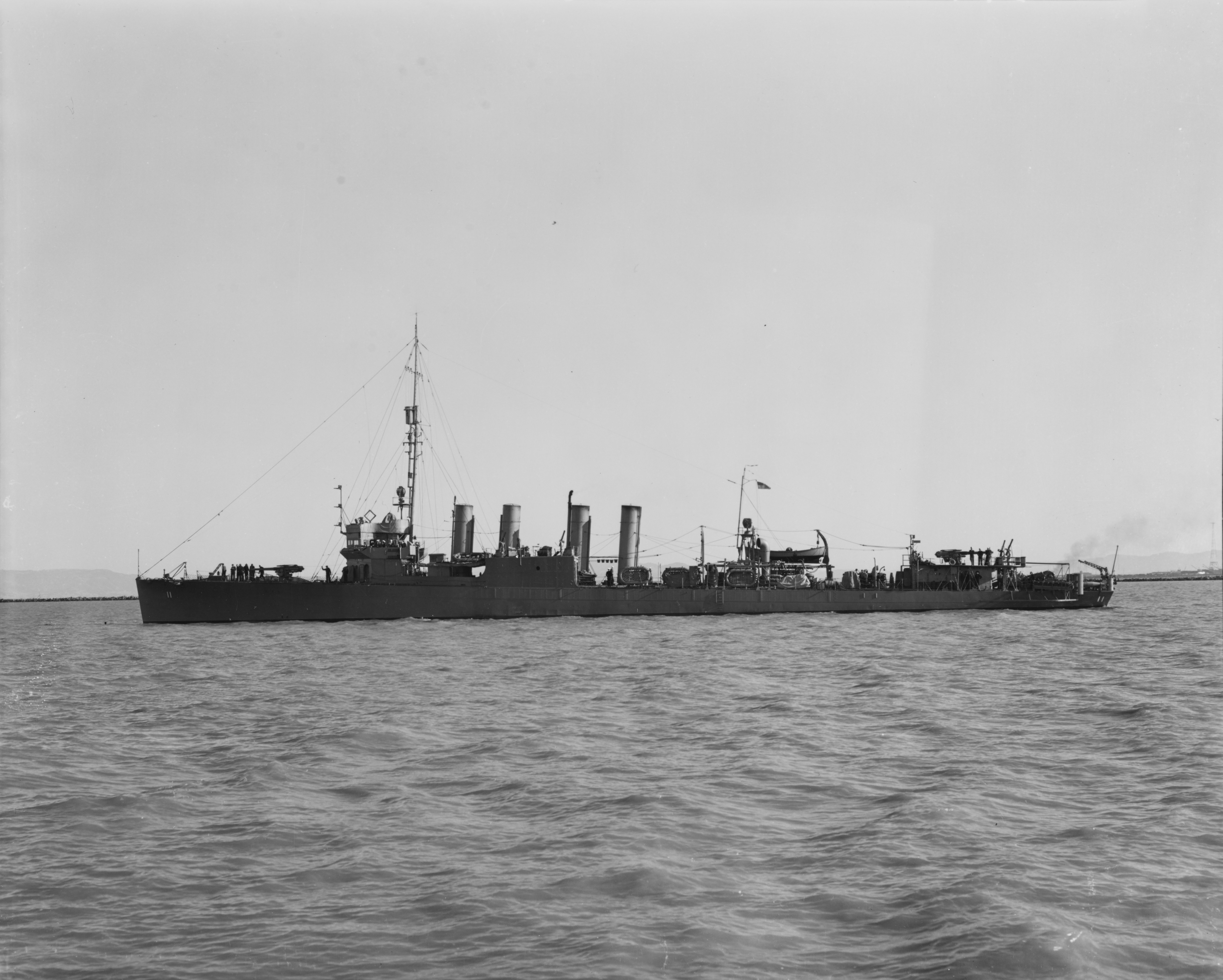
Hovey in June 1942

Hovey continued her operations around Guadalcanal before retiring to New Caledonia on 13 September for replenishment. From there she proceeded to Samoa before returning to Ndeni, Santa Cruz, with a reconnaissance party of marines on board. Returning to New Caledonia, Hovey departed 10 October with two PT boats in tow and 127 drums of aviation gasoline on board, which she delivered to Tulagi two days later. Hovey continued escort duty between Guadalcanal and Espiritu Santo, until she returned to San Francisco 19 April 1943 for overhaul. She joined a convoy out of Mare Island on 31 May for New Caledonia, arriving 10 August. She then resumed her escort and patrol duties until 30 October when she joined Rear Admiral Theodore S. Wilkinson's III Amphibious Force for the Cape Torokina landing on 1 November 1943. For the next week during the seizure of Empress Augusta Bay, Hovey operated with the invasion forces, screening transports and making pre-landing sweeps.

Hovey continued screening and escort duties in the Solomons until 5 April 1944 when she escorted Lindenwald from Tulagi to Majuro, Marshall Islands. She returned to Espiritu Santo on 11 April and on the 20th joined Task Unit 34.9.3 (Captain Kane in Petrof Bay) delivering replacement planes to other carriers at Manus. The task unit rendezvoused 29 April with Fast Carrier Task Force (TF 58) to furnish replacement planes for the first strikes on Truk. Proceeding to Florida Island, Hovey departed for the U.S. West Coast, arriving 31 May via Pearl Harbor.

==== Central Pacific campaigns ====
Repairs complete, Hovey sailed for Pearl Harbor 29 July to become flagship for Mine Squadron Two (Commander W. R. Loud). She sortied from Port Purvis on Florida Island, in the Solomons, 6 September as part of the anti-submarine screen for Rear Admiral Jesse B. Oldendorf's Western Gunfire Support Group for operations in the southern Palaus. After sweeps between Angaur and Peleliu Islands and in Kossol Passage, Hovey took up antisubmarine patrol in the transport area off Peleliu Island. She joined the Minesweeping and Hydrographic Group of Rear Admiral Thomas Sprague's Escort Carrier Group for the invasion of Leyte (17–25 October 1944). On the 17th she began sweeping ahead of the high speed transports and fire support vessels in the approach to the landing beaches on Dinagat Island. After more sweeps through Looc Bay and the Tacloban-Dulag approach Hovey retired to Manus 25 October.

==== Invasion of Luzon ====
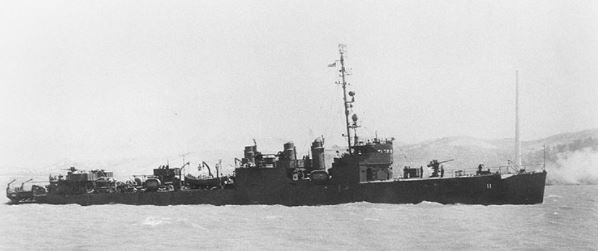
USS Hovey (DMS-11) configured as minesweeper with three stacks, crane at squared stern, May 1943

As flagship for Commander Loud's Minesweeping and Hydrographic Group, Hovey departed Manus 23 December, arriving Leyte Gulf the 30th. She sortied 2 January 1945, proceeded south through Surigao Strait and passed into the Mindanao Sea en route to the landings on Lingayen, Luzon. Many reconnaissance aircraft harassed the convoy during the night but no attacks developed until morning of 3 January.

From then on, the convoy was under such heavy air attack that Hovey had to adopt the policy of not firing unless she was directly under attack, fearing that she would expend all her ammunition. In the entrance to Lingayen Gulf, at 0800 the sweepers came under attack and Hovey immediately shot down one kamikaze. As the ships made a return sweep, two kamikazes made straight runs on the last two ships in the column, crashing into Brooks and Long. Hovey slipped her gear and stood in to assist Long. Long's entire bridge and well deck was on fire, with intermittent explosions coming from the forward magazine and ready ammunition. Because of the explosions and air attacks, Hovey could not get alongside, but spent an hour picking up 149 survivors. Of the survivors of the Long, rescued by Hovey, thirty-five were wounded by burns, and one died. At dark the sweepers made their night retirement and began steaming off the entrance to Lingayen Gulf.

With the exception of the USS Southard struck on 6 January at 1732, no more damaging attacks occurred to the sweepers until 0425, the morning of 7 January, when two enemy aircraft were picked up on radar. At 0450, one plane flying low to the water came in from the starboard quarter passing ahead of Hovey. A few moments later, another plane coming from the port beam was put on fire by Chandler. This plane passed very low over Hovey and crashed off the starboard beam. At 0455, the instant the burning plane crashed, Hovey was struck by a torpedo on her starboard side in the after engine room. Lights and power were lost instantly. The stern remained nearly level and sinking to the top of the after deck house, the bow listed 40 degrees to starboard and rose out of the water, the ship breaking in half. Two minutes later the bow listed to 90 degrees, rose vertically and rapidly sank in 54 fathoms (324 ft; 99 m) of water. Twenty four men were killed in addition to twenty four more men who were survivors from Long and Brooks. Survivors of the Hovey, which included rescued survivors of the Brooks and most of the crew of the Long were rescued by both USS Chandler (DD-206), who recovered a total of 229 officers and enlisted that day, and later by USS West Virginia.

Commander Wayne Rowe Loud was awarded a Navy Cross for the performance of the minesweeping units under his command at Lingayen. The commendation read in part:

With his force suffering substantial losses from hostile suicide attacks carried out on an unprecedented scale, Captain Loud aggressively maneuvered the ships of his command in the successful fulfillment of their mission. By his personal example of coolness and fortitude after his flagship had been damaged during a particularly heavy attack, he inspired those under his leadership to greater endeavor and contributed materially to the success of the Lingayen operation.

== Awards ==
Hovey received eight battle stars for World War II service.
