= Charles Hovey (naval officer) =

United States Navy officer

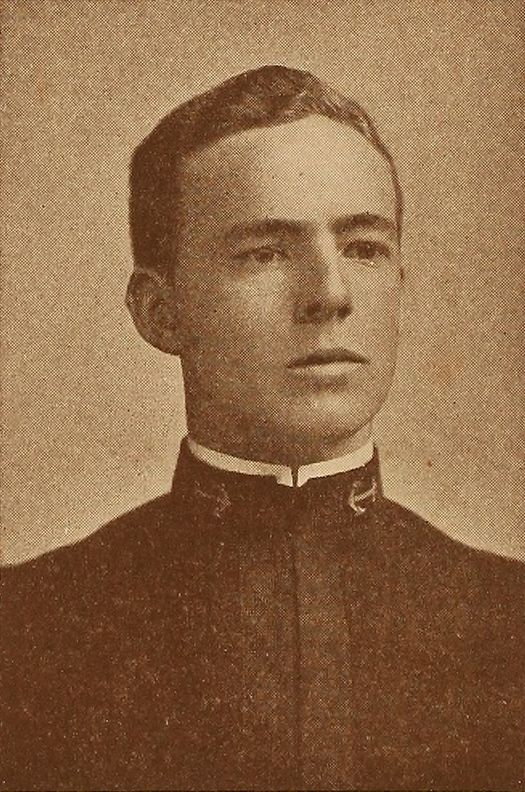
- Hovey's yearbook photo from the United States Naval Academy.
- Born: Charles Emerson Hovey; January 10, 1885, Portsmouth, New Hampshire, U.S.
- Died: September 24, 1911 (aged 26)
- Allegiance: United States of America
- Branch: United States Navy
- Service years: 1907 - 1911
- Rank: Ensign
- Conflicts: Philippine–American War

Charles Emerson Hovey (10 January 1885 – 24 September 1911) was an officer in the United States Navy during the Philippine–American War. He wrote the first edition of the Watch Officer's Manual, published in 1911 and kept in print in subsequent revisions into the 21st century by the United States Naval Institute.

Born in Portsmouth, New Hampshire, Hovey graduated from the United States Naval Academy in 1907. He served aboard the USS Pampanga (PG-39) in the Philippines in 1911. While in charge of a shore party on the island of Basilan, Hovey was killed by gunshot when attacked by Filipinos on 24 September 1911.

USS Hovey (DD-208) was named for him. Veterans of Foreign Wars post #168 in Portsmouth, New Hampshire, is also named for him as Emerson Hovey. There is some irony in this - the Philippine conflict was not classified as a "foreign war" at the time of his death, since the Philippines was then a U.S. colony. There is also a fountain in Portsmouth's waterfront Prescott Park honoring him.
