= QF 6-pounder Hotchkiss =

Family of light 57mm naval guns

QF 6 pounder Hotchkiss
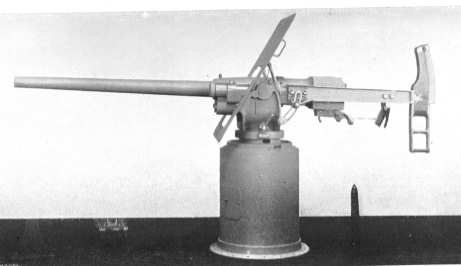
- Early Elswick gun on recoil mounting
- Type: Naval gun; Coast defence gun; Tank gun
- Place of origin: France

Service history
- In service: 1885–1990
- Used by: See Users
- Wars: See Wars

Production history
- Designer: Hotchkiss et Cie
- Designed: 1883
- Manufacturer: Elswick
- Produced: 1884
- No. built: 3,984 (UK)
- Variants: 40 to 58 calibre

Specifications
- Mass: 821–849 lb (372–385 kg) barrel & breech
- Length: 8.1 ft (2.5 m)
- Barrel length: 7.4 ft (2.3 m) 40 calibre
- Shell: 57x307R; see ammunition section
- Calibre: 57-millimetre (2.244 in)
- Breech: Vertical sliding-block
- Recoil: Hydro-spring, 4 inch
- Elevation: Dependent on mount
- Rate of fire: 25 / minute
- Muzzle velocity: 1,818 feet per second (554 m/s)
- Effective firing range: 4,000 yards (3,700 m)

The Ordnance QF Hotchkiss 6 pounder gun Mk I and Mk II or QF 6 pounder 8 cwt were a family of long-lived light 57 mm naval guns introduced in 1885 to defend against new, small and fast vessels such as torpedo boats and later submarines. Many variants were produced, often under licence, which ranged in length from 40 to 58 calibres, with 40 calibre the most common.

6-pounders were widely used by the navies of a number of nations and often used by both sides in a conflict. Due to advances in torpedo delivery and performance, 6-pounder guns were rapidly made obsolete and were replaced with larger guns aboard most larger warships. This led to their being used ashore during World War I as coastal defence guns, the first tank guns and as anti-aircraft guns, whether on improvised or specialized HA/LA mounts. During World War II 6-pounder guns were put back in service to arm small warships and as coastal defence guns. The last ships to carry 6-pounders were the Aegir-class offshore patrol vessels of the Icelandic Coast Guard which replaced them in 1990 with the Bofors 40mm L/60 autocannon.

== Operational history ==
=== Argentine service ===
Argentina adopted the 40 calibre Hotchkiss 6-pounder in the 1890s, to arm its four Giuseppe Garibaldi-class armoured cruisers, purchased from Italy. The Argentinians were at that time engaged in a naval arms race with Chile. The last ships from this class were retired from service on 2 August 1954. Argentinian ships armed with 6-pounder guns include:

- ARA General Belgrano
- ARA Garibaldi
- ARA Pueyrredón
- ARA San Martin

=== Brazilian service ===
Brazil adopted the 40 calibre Hotchkiss 6-pounder in the 1890s, to arm its coastal defence ships, protected cruisers and torpedo-gunboats. The Brazilians also used the competing Nordenfelt 6 pounders in lesser numbers. The last Brazilian ship retired was the coastal defence ship Marshal Floriano in 1936. The former Brazilian coastal defence ship Marshal Deodoro was sold to Mexico in 1924 and renamed Anáhuac, which was retired in 1938.

- Marshal Deodoro-class coastal defence ships
- Brazilian cruiser República
- Brazilian cruiser Almirante Barroso
- Brazilian torpedo gunboat Tiradentes

=== Chilean service ===
Chile adopted the 40 calibre Hotchkiss 6-pounder in the 1890s, to arm a battleship, an armoured cruiser, and several protected cruisers. The last of these ships was retired in 1933.

- Chilean battleship Capitán Prat
- Chilean cruiser Esmeralda
- Chilean cruiser Presidente Errázuriz
- Chilean cruiser Ministro Zenteno
- Chilean cruiser O'Higgins
- Chilean cruiser Presidente Pinto

=== Chinese service ===
China adopted the Hotchkiss 6-pounder in the 1880s, to arm its protected cruisers. During the First Sino-Japanese War, ships on both sides were armed with Hotchkiss 6-pounder guns. Surviving 6-pounder guns were in Chinese service aboard gunboats and auxiliaries during the Second Sino-Japanese War and World War II.

- Zhiyuen-class cruisers
- Chinese cruiser Jingyuen

=== French service ===
Despite originating in France the 6-pounder was not widely used by the French. Like the British, who paired their QF 3-pounder Hotchkiss guns with the larger 6-pounder, the French often paired their 3-pounders with the more powerful Canon de 65 mm Modèle 1891. This gun is sometimes referred to as a 9-pounder in English publications. During World War II a few Flower-class Corvettes (Aconit, Commandant Drogou, Commandant Détroyat, Commandant d`Estienne d`Orves, Mimosa, Renoncule, Roselys) of the Free French Navy were armed with two 6-pounder guns.

=== Irish service ===
A 6-pounder gun was fitted to the single Vickers Mk. D tank used by the Irish Army between 1929 and 1940. When the tank was scrapped in 1940 the gun was removed and used as an anti-tank weapon.

=== Italian service ===
Italy adopted the 40 calibre Hotchkiss 6-pounder in 1886 to arm its armoured cruisers, battleships, protected cruisers, torpedo boats and torpedo cruisers. The Italians also adopted the competing 43 calibre Nordenfelt 6 pounder gun and by 1909 the Nordenfelt had replaced the Hotchkiss in service. This was the opposite of the British who replaced their Nordenfelt guns with Hotchkiss guns.

- Etna-class cruisers
- Goito-class cruisers
- Regioni-class cruisers
- Vettor Pisani-class cruisers
- Italian battleship Emanuele Filiberto
- Italian cruiser Marco Polo
- Italian cruiser Piemonte
- Italian cruiser Calabria
- Italian cruiser Dogali
- Italian cruiser Giovanni Bausan
- Italian cruiser Marco Polo

=== Japanese service ===
Japan adopted the 40 calibre Hotchkiss 6-pounder in the 1880s to arm its destroyers, protected cruisers and unprotected cruisers. The Japanese versions of the 6-pounder were known as Yamanouchi guns and were largely identical to their British equivalents. Ships on both sides of the First Sino-Japanese war and Russo-Japanese war were armed with Hotchkiss 6-pounder guns. The 6-pounder was the standard secondary and tertiary armament on most Japanese destroyers built between 1890 and 1920, and was still in service as late as the Pacific War.

- Akatsuki-class destroyers
- Harusame-class destroyers
- Ikazuchi-class destroyers
- Matsushima-class cruisers
- Murakumo-class destroyers
- Naniwa-class cruisers
- Shirakumo-class destroyers
- Suma-class cruisers
- Japanese cruiser Izumi
- Japanese cruiser Unebi
- Japanese cruiser Takao

=== Russian services ===
The Russians began purchasing 40 calibre 6-pounders from France starting in 1904 to replace its 3-pounder and 1-pounder guns in the anti-torpedo boat role. In addition to 40 calibre guns, 50 and 58 calibre guns were also produced under license at the Obukhov State Plant. These were installed on torpedo cruisers and submarines built from 1905 to 1917. Beginning in 1909–1910 most larger surface ships began replacing their 6-pounders with 75 mm 50 calibre Pattern 1892 and 102 mm 60 calibre Pattern 1911 guns when combat experience in the Russo-Japanese war showed the 6-pounders were almost as ineffective as the 3-pounder and 1-pounder guns they had replaced. In 1911–12 a number were turned over to the Army for use as coastal artillery, and later in 1914 some were converted into anti-aircraft guns. In addition to the Hotchkiss guns there were also Nordenfeld Guns which were used as ranging guns for coastal defences. Finland, a successor state to the Russian Empire, inherited a number of 6-pounders and used them throughout the Winter War and World War II in the coastal artillery role.

- Bars-class submarines
- Morzh-class submarines
- Narval-class submarines
- Finn-class torpedo cruisers
- Okhotnik-class torpedo cruisers
- Ukrayna-class torpedo cruisers
- Vsadnik-class torpedo cruisers

=== Spanish service ===
Spain adopted both the 40-calibre Hotchkiss 6-pounder and the 42-calibre Nordenfelt 6-pounder in the 1880s to arm its armoured cruisers, battleships, protected cruisers and unarmoured cruisers. Seven ships (1 battleship, 3 unarmoured cruisers and 3 protected cruisers) carried the Hotchkiss guns and eleven (8 unarmoured cruisers and 3 protected cruisers) carried the Nordenfelt guns. Ships on both sides of the Spanish–American War were armed with various 6-pounder guns (Driggs-Schroeder, Hotchkiss and Nordenfelt). The Spanish cruiser Isla de Cuba, which was captured by the United States during the Spanish–American War and served as the USS Isla de Cuba until sold to Venezuela in 1912 and renamed Mariscal Sucre, was the last ship decommissioned and scrapped in 1940.

- Torpedo gunboat Destructor
- Alfonso XII-class cruisers
- Isla de Luzón-class cruisers
- Spanish battleship Pelayo

=== United Kingdom service ===
The UK adopted a 40 calibre (i.e. 90-inch barrel) version as Ordnance QF Hotchkiss 6 pounder gun (Note: British forces traditionally denoted smaller ordnance by the weight of its standard projectile, in this case approximately 6 lb (2.7 kg))Mk I and Mk II or QF 6 pounder 8 cwt. It was manufactured under licence by the Elswick Ordnance Company. They were originally mounted from 1885 onwards for use against the new (steam-driven) torpedo boats which started to enter service in the late 1870s.

The UK also adopted the competing 42 calibre Ordnance QF 6 pounder Nordenfelt at the same time as the QF 6-pounder Hotchkiss, but the Royal Navy was not satisfied with the special Nordenfelt ammunition and fuzes. Following the explosion in 1900 of an ammunition ship due to defective fuses, Britain replaced Nordenfelt fuzes with the Hotchkiss designs and Nordenfelt guns were phased out in favor of the Hotchkiss guns and were declared obsolete by 1919.

The original 1885 Hotchkiss Mk I was a built-up gun with a barrel, jacket and a locking hoop screwed to the front of the jacket. The Mk I lacked a recoil system, but the Mk II of 1890 introduced a hydraulic recoil mechanism with a pair of hydro-spring cylinders. During World War I the navy required many more guns and an autofretted, mono-block barrel version was developed to simplify manufacture and identified as "6 pdr Single Tube". Initially these guns were only allowed to be fired with a special lower charge, but in 1917 they were relined with A tubes as Mk I+++ which enabled them to use the standard 6-pounder ammunition.

After World War I the gun was considered obsolete for combat use, but continued in use as a saluting gun and as sub-calibre training guns. Of the 3,984 produced it was estimated that 1,640 still existed in 1939. With the onset of World War II the remaining guns were rushed back into service for anti-submarine defence, E-boat defence and for coastal defence. New non-recoil Mk VI, Mk VI* and Mk VI** mountings were built with elevations between -10° and +70°. These mountings were used on early models of the Fairmile D Motor Gunboats, Motor Launches and Flower-class corvettes. Some of which were not re-armed with the modern 6-pdr Mk IIA with auto-loader until late 1944.

Royal Navy ships armed with QF 6-pounder Hotchkiss guns include:

- A-class destroyers
- Admiral-class ironclads
- Adventure-class cruisers
- Apollo-class cruisers
- B-class destroyers
- Banff-class sloops
- British H-class submarines
- C and D-class destroyers
- C-class cruisers
- C-class destroyers
- Castle-class trawlers
- CD-class naval drifters
- Centurion-class battleships
- Conqueror-class ironclad rams
- D-class destroyers
- Daring-class destroyers
- Devastation-class ironclads
- Dryad-class torpedo gunboats
- E and F-class destroyers
- Fly-class gunboats
- G and H-class destroyers
- Indefatigable-class battlecruisers
- Lion-class battlecruisers
- M15-class monitors
- M29-class monitors
- Marathon-class cruisers
- Orlando-class cruisers
- River-class destroyers
- Royal Sovereign-class battleships
- Stour-class destroyers
- Trafalgar-class ironclads
- Surprise-class cruisers
- Victoria-class battleships
- Warrior-class cruisers

==== Tank service ====
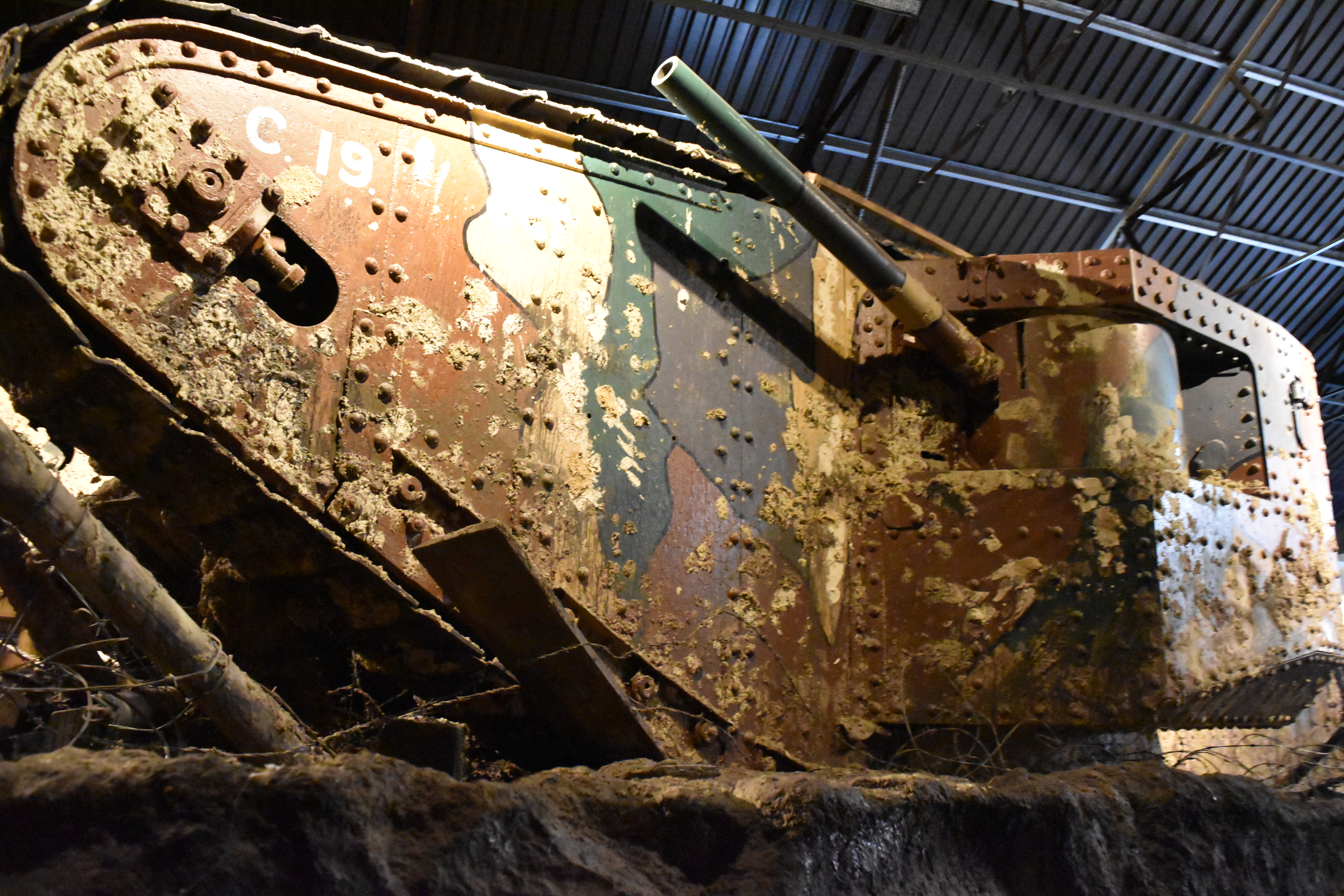
Mark I Male tank with a long QF 6-pounder 8 cwt gun, at the Bovington Tank Museum.

The 6-pounder was used to equip Male versions of the early British Mk I – Mk III tanks. In 1916 the British Army was faced with the difficulty of quickly providing a new class of weapon. The existing Hotchkiss 6-pounder naval gun appeared to most closely meet the need (a compact enough weapon to fit into a tank sponson with a sufficient high explosive shell). A single gun was mounted in each sponson, i.e. two per Male tank able to fire forwards or to the side. Tanks armed only with machine guns were designated as 'Female'.

The gun turned out to be too long for practical use as the end of the barrel could come into contact with the ground or other obstacles as the tank traveled over uneven ground. The British chose to shorten the gun rather than change its location and replaced it in 1917 in the Mark IV tank onwards by the shorter QF 6 pounder 6 cwt Hotchkiss.

==== Anti-aircraft service ====
Britain lacked any dedicated air-defence artillery early in World War I and up to 72 6-pounders were adapted to high-angle pedestal mountings at key establishments in Britain for close air defence by 1916. They are not listed as still being in service in this role at the end of the war, presumably because German bombing attacks were conducted from relatively high altitudes which would have been beyond the gun's range.

=== United States service ===
Manufacturer	Manufacturers Designation	US Designation	Calibre
Hotchkiss	Mk I	Mk I	40
Hotchkiss	Mk I (trunnionless)	Mk II	40
Hotchkiss	Mk I long	Mk III	45
Driggs-Schroeder	Nos. 2, 4 and 5 rapid-fire field gun	Mk IV	50
?	Lynch field gun	Mk V	35
Driggs-Schroeder	Mk I rapid-fire	Mk VI	45
Hotchkiss	Mk II long	Mk VII	45
Driggs-Schroeder	Mk II	Mk VIII	50
Vickers-Maxim	Mk II semi-automatic	Mk IX	42
Nordenfelt	Mk II rapid-fire	Mk X	42
Driggs-Seaburry	Mk II semi-automatic	Mk XI	50
Bethlehem Steel	Mk I	(No US designation sold to Britain in WWI)	50

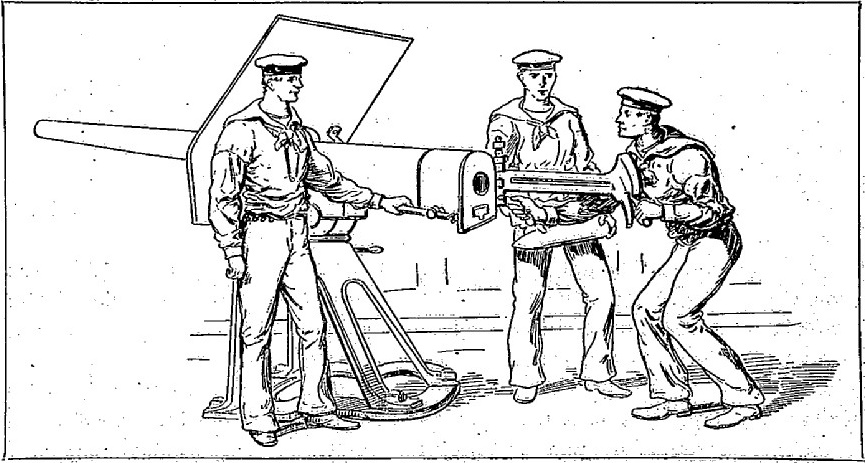
Hotchkiss 6-pounder being prepared to combat at the USS Detroit (L'Univers Illustré, 1894).

The history of the Hotchkiss 6-pounder (called the Rapid Fire gun rather than Quick Firer in the US) in United States Navy and Army service is a complex story. It was used in conjunction with another maker's design, its primary rival being the Driggs-Schroeder 6-pounder. Oddly, one shipbuilding and naval supply company, Cramp & Sons, had a license to build both the Hotchkiss and Driggs-Schroeder and sold both to the Navy in parallel. It appears that Hotchkiss type guns had an edge in production in the first half of the 1890s, but by 1895 Driggs-Schroeders were being produced in quantity to equip a considerable number of newly commissioned ships. The initial purchases by the Navy were in small lots each year and there was no mass-production of these guns like one would see in smaller weapons. The Navy made certain that the ammunition for both the Hotchkiss and Driggs-Schroeder guns were identical.

There is no question that the Driggs-Schroeders were predominant in the new protected and armoured cruisers that were being commissioned by 1895. However, USS Texas, a second class battleship commissioned in 1895, carried a mixed 6-pounder complement of ten Driggs-Schroeders and two Hotchkiss guns. USS Maine, an armoured cruiser, exclusively carried Driggs-Schroeder 6-pounders although it had a mixed one pounder battery of both Driggs-Schroeder and Hotchkiss. Ships known to have carried exclusively Driggs-Schroeder 6-pounders are USS Olympia, Brooklyn, New York, and Columbia. Although from photographs of particular guns on the vessels in question, it appears that the battleships USS Indiana, USS Oregon, and USS Iowa carried exclusively Hotchkiss 6-pounders with USS Massachusetts carrying Driggs-Schroeders. Unlike her 8-inch guns, the preserved USS Olympia (C-6) retains her Driggs-Schroeder 6-pounders. She is at the Independence Seaport Museum in Philadelphia.

Beginning in 1910 6-pounder guns were replaced by 3"/50 calibre guns aboard US Navy ships. However smaller ships such as US Coast Guard cutters, gunboats and minesweepers continued to use 6-pounders in the years between World War I and World War II.

- Amphitrite-class monitors
- Arkansas-class monitors
- Bainbridge-class destroyers
- Cincinnati-class cruisers
- Columbia-class cruisers
- Denver-class cruisers
- Dubuque-class gunboats
- Florida-class battleships
- Hawk-class minesweepers
- Illinois-class battleships
- Indiana-class battleships
- Kearsarge-class battleships
- Montgomery-class cruisers
- New Orleans-class cruisers
- Tampa-class cutters
- Treasury-class cutters
- Truxtun-class destroyers
- Yorktown-class gunboats
- USCGC Taney (WHEC-37)
- USS Annapolis (PG-10)
- USS Atlanta
- USS Baltimore (C-3)
- USS Boston
- USS Charleston (C-2)
- USS Chicago
- USS Dolphin (PG-24)
- USS Elcano (PG-38)
- USS Iowa (BB-4)
- USS Isla de Cuba (1886)
- USS Isla de Luzon (1886)
- USS Katahdin (1893)
- USS Machias (PG-5)
- USS Marietta (PG-15)
- USS Monocacy (PG-20)
- USS Nashville (PG-7)
- USS Newark (C-1)
- USS Newport (PG-12)
- USS Palos (PG-16)
- USS Pampanga (PG-39)
- USS Paragua
- USS Philadelphia (C-4)
- USS Puritan (BM-1)
- USS Quiros (PG-40)
- USS Samar (PG-41)
- USS San Francisco (C-5)
- USS Vicksburg (PG-11)
- USS Washington (ACR-11)
- USS Wheeling (PG-14)
- USS Whitney (AD-4)

==== US Army service ====
The US Army also used the Hotchkiss 6-pounder, referred to as a "2.24-inch gun" in some period references. As the primary defender of coastal fortifications and harbours, the US Army had a need for lighter guns to supplement their shore batteries, particularly since land defence against infantry was a consideration in the 1890s. (Note: Somewhat inexplicably, defence against land attack disappeared from the design of forts built after 1900, and the Land Defense Project of the World War I era was apparently not repeated.) The Army was in an experimental phase like the Navy, testing new weapons in an era when military budgets were expanding after decades of Congressional stinginess.

It appears that the US Army and US Navy, while both using the "Mark" system, assigned their designations to different ordnance. References indicate that Driggs-Schroeder guns, manufactured by the American Ordnance Company and designated Mark II and Mark III, were adopted along with Driggs-Seabury weapons designated M1898 and M1900. In 1898–1901 a total of 97 weapons were acquired: 20 M1898, 40 M1900, 10 Mark II, and 27 Mark III guns. However, 17 M1898 and all ten Mark II guns were transferred for use on Army troop transports in the Spanish–American War of 1898, leaving 70 weapons for land use. The mountings for the Army six pounders were called M1898 and M1898 (modified) "rampart mounts" or "parapet mounts", wheeled carriages with fittings that allowed them to be secured to pintle mounts. Another reference has somewhat different figures. There were generally two of these guns issued per major fort, and eventually many of them became saluting guns at the post's flagpole. A dozen were deployed at Fort Ruger in Hawaii as part of the Land Defense Project of 1915–1919, while others were deployed in the Philippines under this project.

== Ammunition ==
The 6-pounder fired Fixed QF 57x307R ammunition. A complete round weighed 9.7 lb (4.4 kg) and its projectile weighed 6 lb (2.7 kg). The most common types of ammunition available for 6-pounder guns were shrapnel, steel and common shells. In World War II higher-yield high explosive rounds were produced.

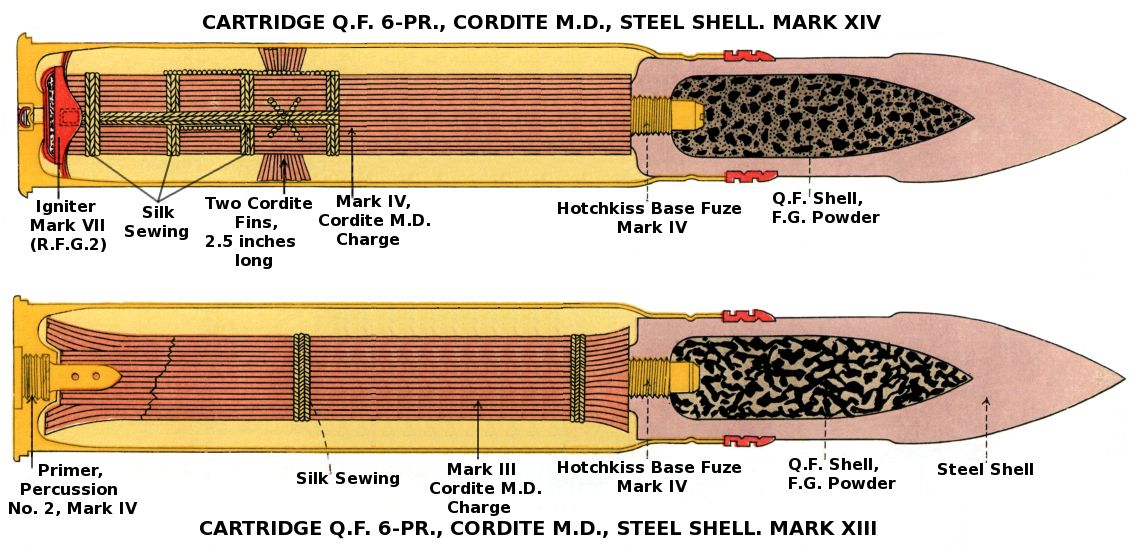
Mk XIV and XIII steel shell rounds with Mk V shell, 1914

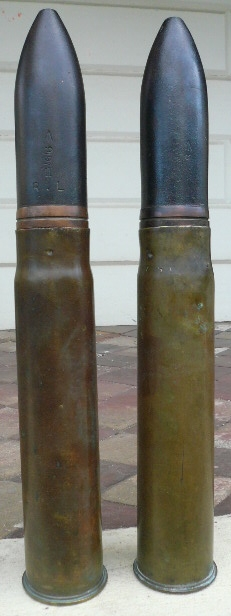
Common shell rounds with Mk II shell from 1891

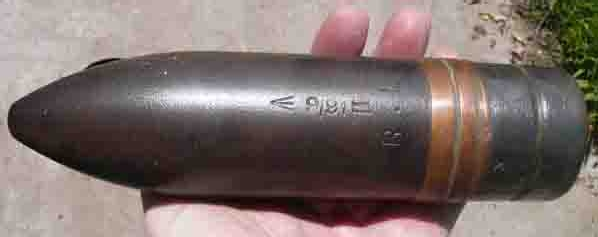
QF 6-pounder common projectile 1891 close-up.

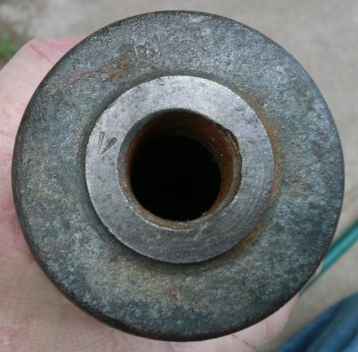
Mk II Shell base, showing fuze hole

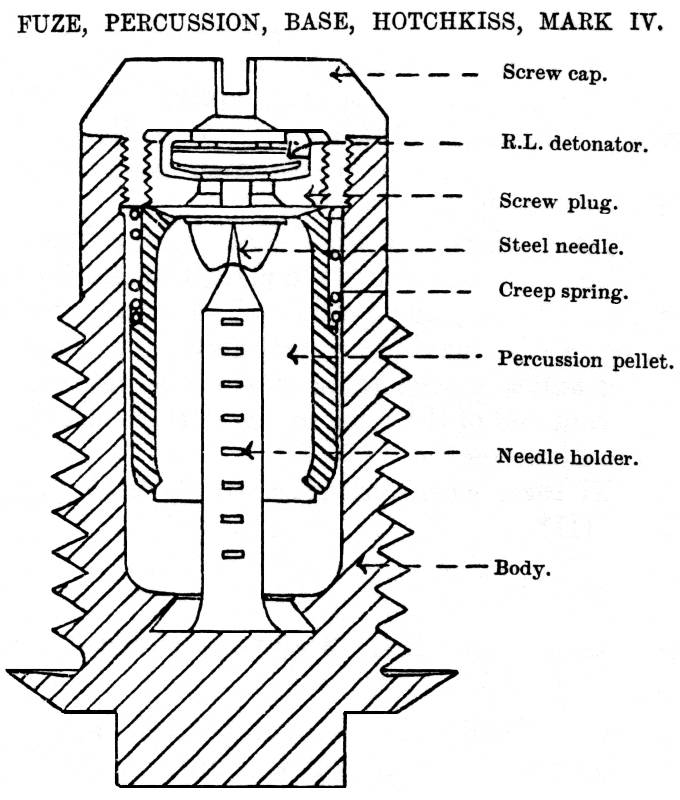
Mk IV base percussion fuze

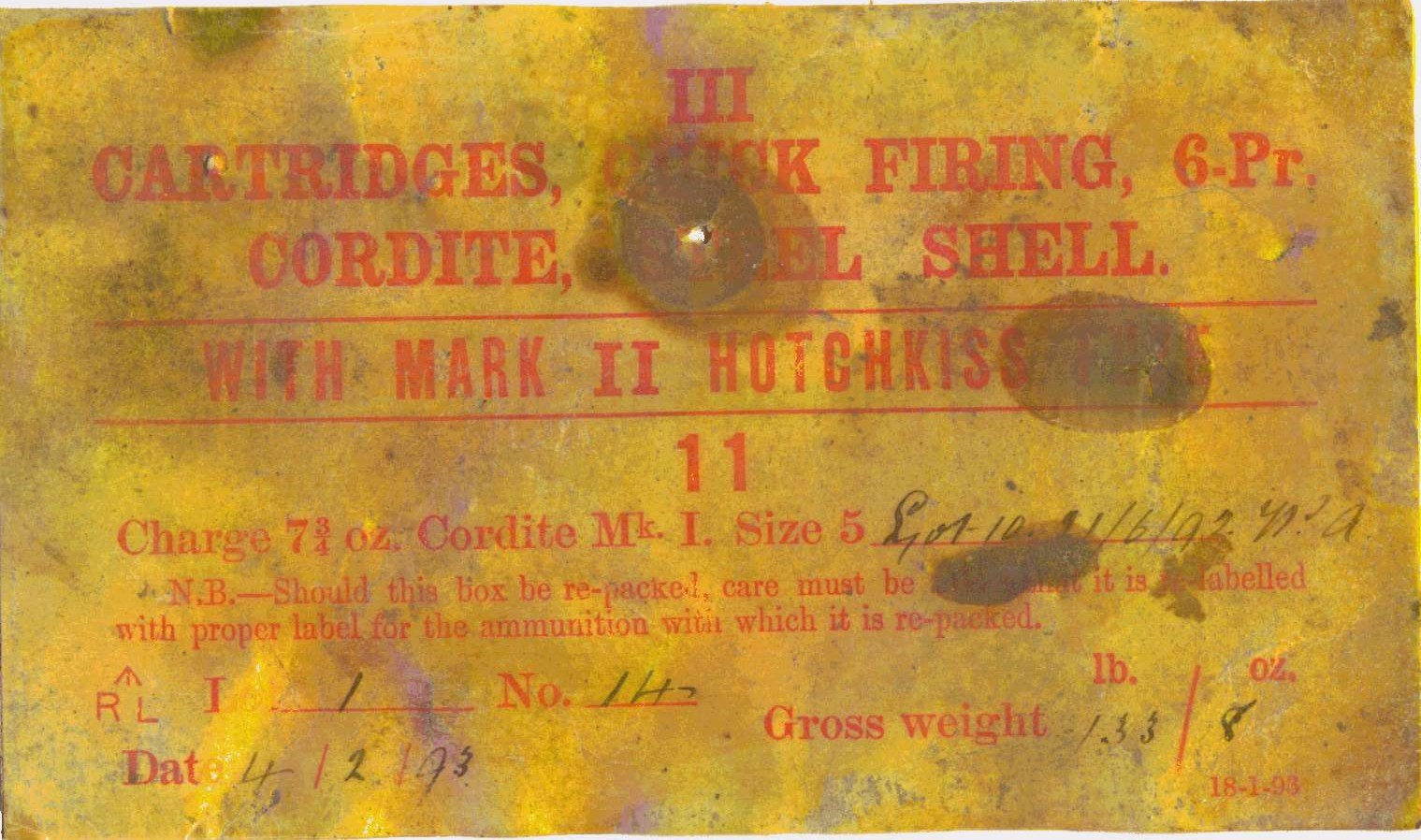
6-pounder ammunition label from 1893

== Photo gallery ==
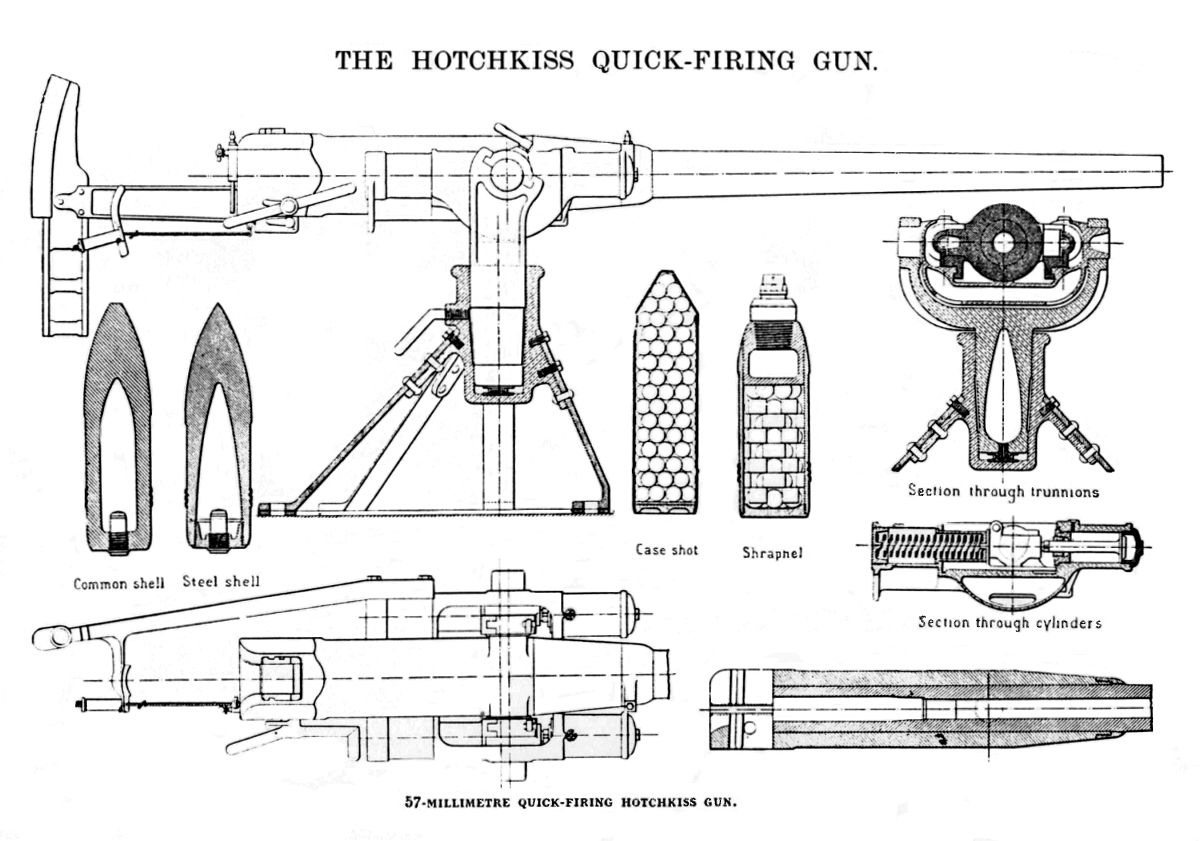
QF 6-pounder Hotchkiss diagram.

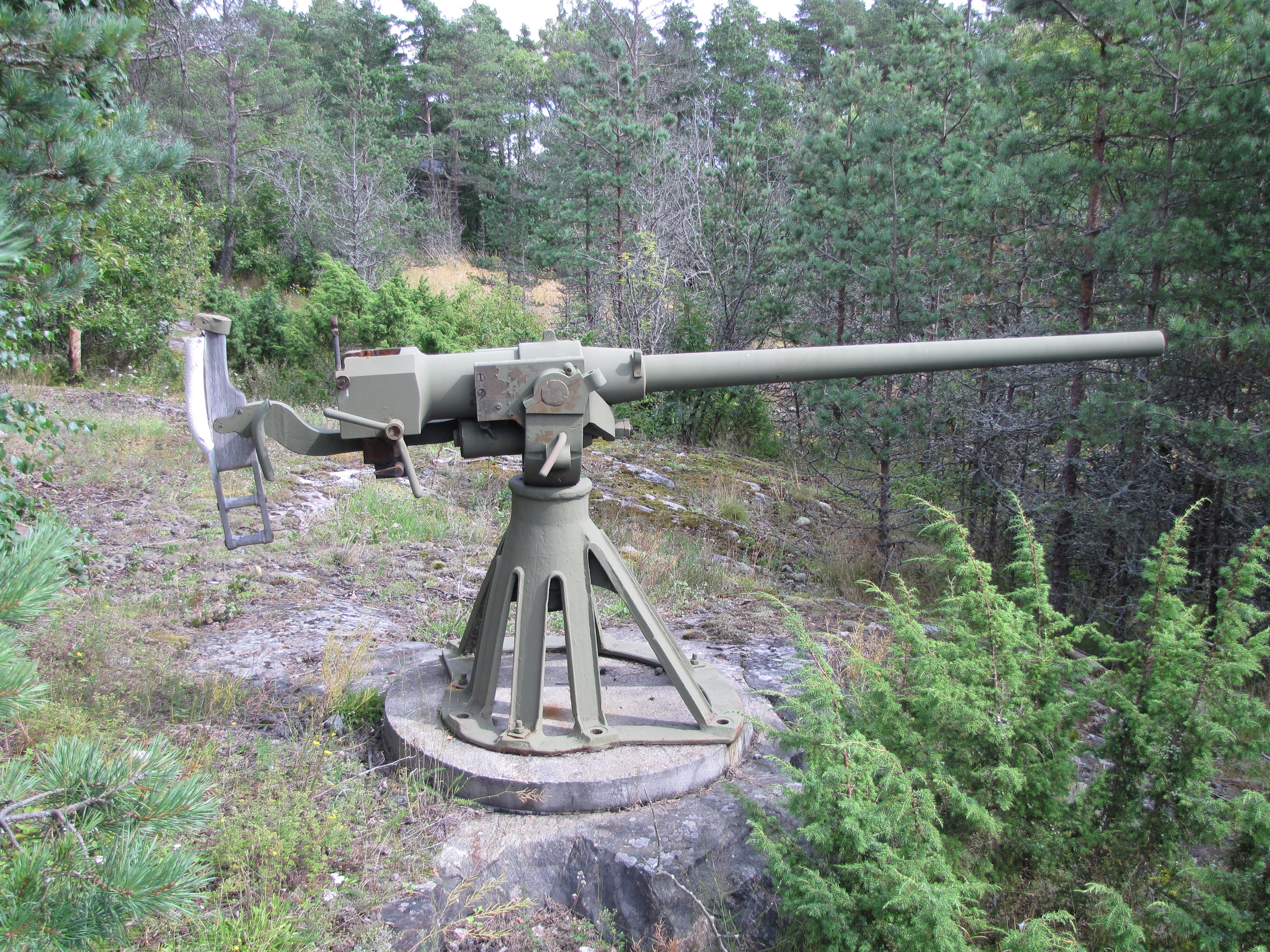
A 45 calibre 6-pounder at Kuivasaari, Finland. The markings on this gun indicate it was produced by Driggs-Seabury in Bridgeport, Connecticut.

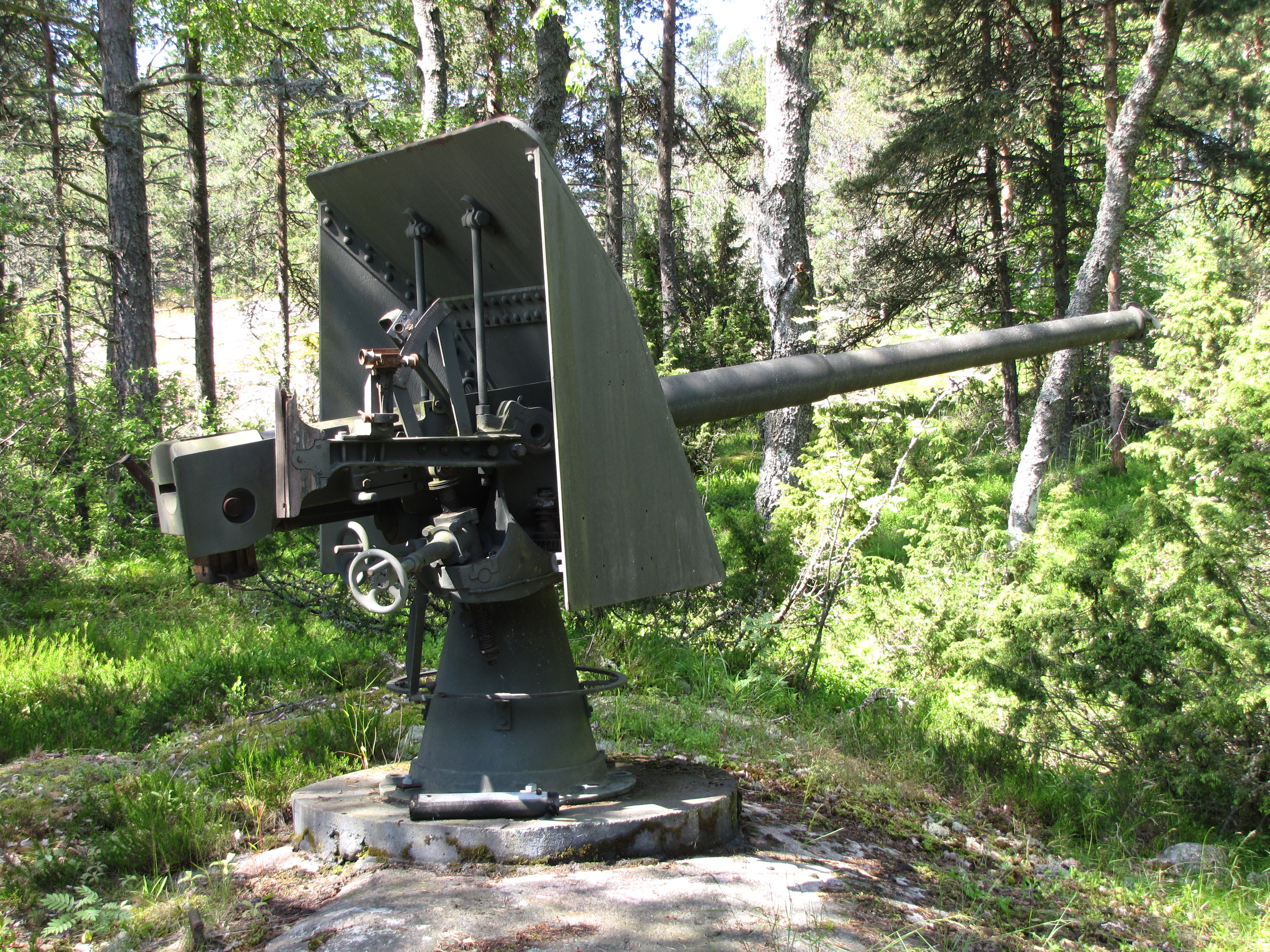
A Russian 58 calibre 6-pounder gun, at Kuivasaari, Finland.

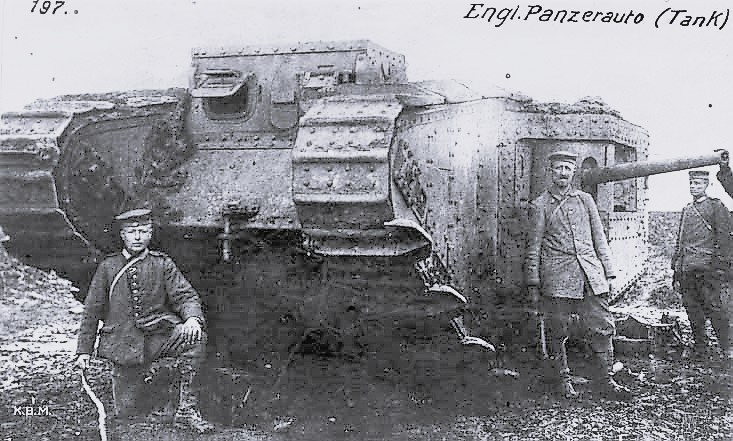
German troops with a captured Mk II tank, showing the unwieldy length of the gun barrel (projecting from sponson on left side of tank).

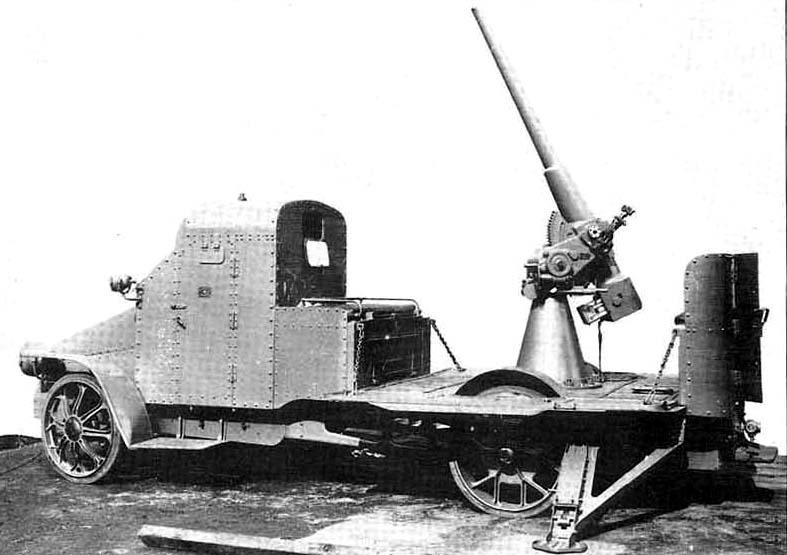
A Russian Austin-Putilov armoured car with a 6-pounder anti-aircraft gun.

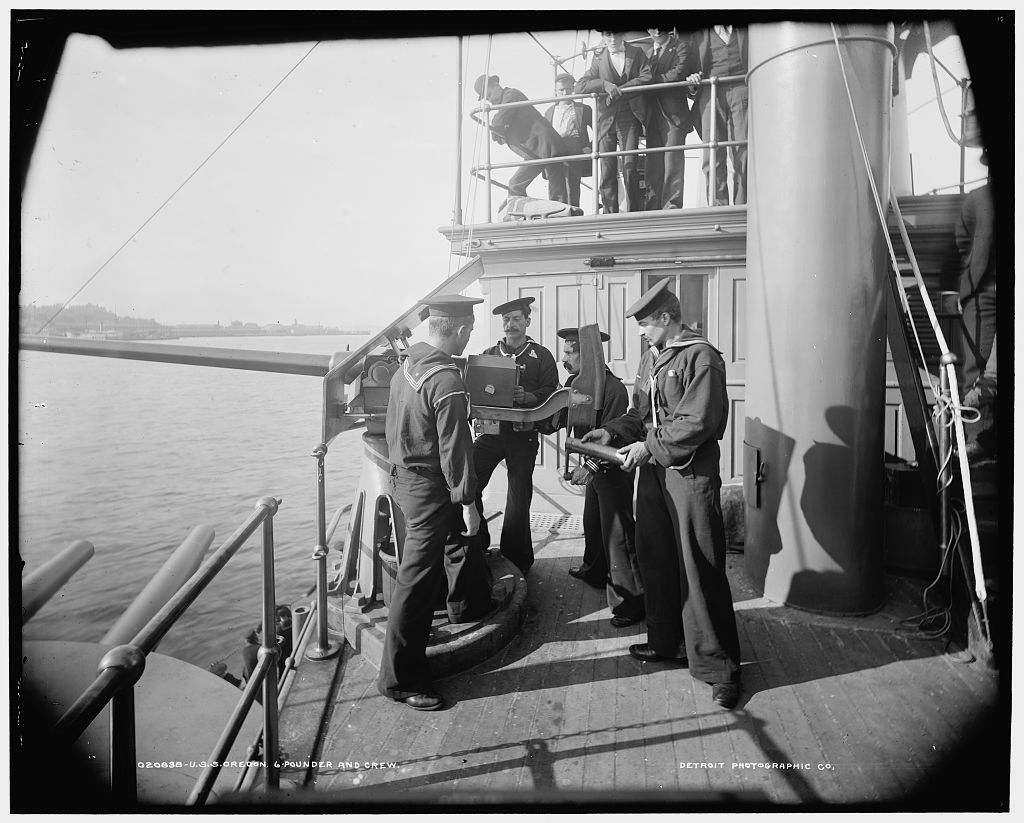
A 6-pounder gun and crew aboard the USS Oregon.

== Licensed production ==
- Elswick Ordnance Company
- Obukhov State Plant
- William Cramp & Sons

== Wars ==
- First Sino-Japanese War
- Spanish–American War
- Russo-Japanese War
- Italo-Turkish War
- First Balkan War
- Second Balkan War
- World War I
- Russian Civil War
- Second Sino-Japanese War
- Winter War
- World War II
- Cod Wars

== Users ==
- Argentina
- Brazil
- Chile
- Cuba
- Denmark
- Finland
- France
- Greece
- Iceland
- Italy
- Empire of Japan
- Mexico
- Peru
- Portugal
- Qing Dynasty
- Republic of China
- Russian Empire
- Spain
- Thailand
- United Kingdom
- Uruguay
- United States
- Venezuela

== Surviving examples ==
- Twin 6 pounder QF Guns Mk I on Pedestal Mount Mk I, Belmont Battery, Fort Rodd Hill, Victoria, British Columbia
- One 6 pounder QF Gun Mk I (#502 Hotchkiss) on Garrison Carriage Mk I** (Hotchkiss Cone Mount), Fort Rodd Hill, Victoria, British Columbia
- One 6 pounder QF Gun Mk I (tube only), Fort Rodd Hill, Victoria, British Columbia
- One 6 pounder QF Gun Mk I (13980 & N1584) on Pedestal Mount Mk I (5110), Bay Street Armoury, Victoria, British Columbia
- One 6 pounder QF Gun Mk III on wheeled carriage, private tank museum, Mattituck, New York
- One 6 pounder QF Gun Mk III on wheeled carriage, Virginia War Museum, Newport News, Virginia
- One 6 pounder QF Gun on wheeled carriage, Veterans' Memorial Park, Plymouth, Michigan
- One 6 pounder QF Gun M1900 on wheeled carriage, Maquoketa, Iowa
- Several 6 pounder RF Guns (Driggs-Schroeder) on USS Olympia (C-6), Independence Seaport Museum, Philadelphia
- Three 6 pounder QF Gun 1892 on recoil mounts, Yacht Club Argentino, Buenos Aires

== See also ==
- 5.2 cm SK L/55 naval gun : German equivalent
- QF 6 pounder Nordenfelt : Maxim-Nordenfelt equivalent
- Canon de 65 mm Modèle 1891 : French equivalent

== Bibliography ==
- Text Book of Gunnery, 1902. LONDON : PRINTED FOR HIS MAJESTY'S STATIONERY OFFICE, BY HARRISON AND SONS, ST. MARTIN'S LANE
- Berhow, Mark A., ed. (2004). American Seacoast Defences, A Reference Guide (Second ed.). CDSG Press. ISBN 978-0-9748167-0-8.
- I.V. Hogg and L.F. Thurston, British Artillery Weapons & Ammunition 1914–1918. London: Ian Allan, 1972. ISBN 978-0-7110-0381-1
- LC Reynolds, Motor Gunboat 658. Cassell Military Paperbacks, London, 2002. ISBN 0-304-36183-6
- Brigadier N.W. Routledge, History of the Royal Regiment of Artillery. Anti-Aircraft Artillery 1914–55. London: Brassey's, 1994 ISBN 1-85753-099-3
- Williford, Glen M. (2016). American Breechloading Mobile Artillery, 1875–1953. Atglen, Pennsylvania: Schiffer Publishing. ISBN 978-0-7643-5049-8.
- Campbell, John (1985). Naval Weapons of World War Two. Annapolis, MD: Naval Institute Press. ISBN 978-0-87021-459-2.
- Friedman, Norman (2011). Naval Weapons of World War One. Barnsley, South Yorkshire, UK: Seaforth. ISBN 978-1-84832-100-7.
