= USS Pampanga =

Gunboat of the United States Navy

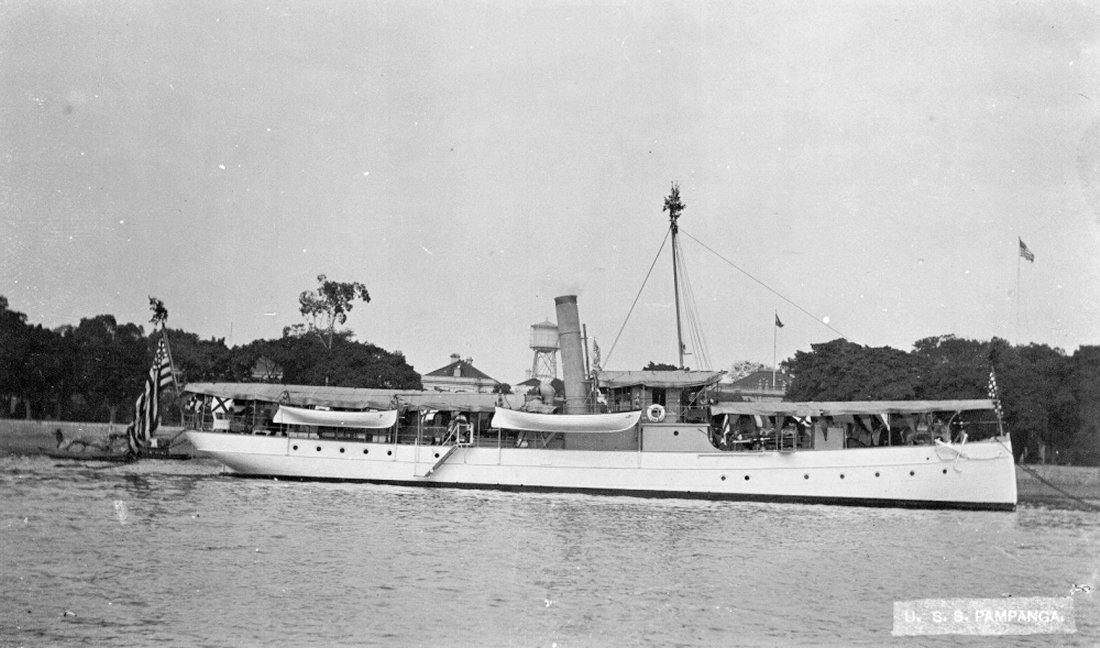

History

Spain
- Name: Pampanga
- Builder: Manila Ship Company, Cavite, Philippines
- Laid down: March 1887
- Launched: February 1888
- Fate: Captured by US Army, Manila Bay, June 1898

United States
- Name: USS Pampanga
- Acquired: by capture, June 1898
- Commissioned: 9 November 1899
- Decommissioned: 18 June 1902
- Recommissioned: 30 January 1904
- Decommissioned: 30 April 1907
- Recommissioned: 12 April 1911
- Decommissioned: 31 May 1915
- Recommissioned: 3 January 1916
- Decommissioned: 6 November 1928
- Fate: Sunk by US Navy, 21 November 1928

General characteristics
- Type: Gunboat
- Displacement: 243 long tons (247 t)
- Length: 121 ft (37 m)
- Beam: 17 ft 10 in (5.44 m)
- Draft: 7 ft 6 in (2.29 m)
- Speed: 10 knots (19 km/h; 12 mph)
- Complement: 30 officers and enlisted
- Armament: 1 × 6-pounder gun; 3 × 3-pounder guns

USS Pampanga (PG-39) was a schooner-rigged iron gunboat in the United States Navy during the Philippine–American War. She retained her Spanish name.

Pampanga was laid down for the Spanish Navy by the Manila Ship Company, Cavite, Philippines, in March 1887; launched in February 1888; captured by the US Army at Manila Bay in June 1898; commissioned in American service on 18 June 1899; and turned over to the US Navy at Cavite Navy Yard on 9 November 1899. Pampanga had two sister-ships which also served in the US Navy, USS Samar (PG-41) and USS Paragua.

== Service history ==
=== 1899–1907 ===
Assigned to patrol duty in Lingayen Gulf, Luzon, Pampanga operated in support of the Army engaged in fighting the Philippine–American War, carrying troops and supplies, providing shore bombardment to forces ashore, and blockaded rebel towns. Moving on to the Cebu station in mid-1900, the gunboat continued cooperating with the Army there into 1901 and then switched to patrolling off Samar. She returned to Cavite to decommission on 18 June 1902 and recommissioned on 30 January 1904, continuing duty on the Philippine Station, basing out of Cavite until 1906. The warship then cruised the waters off Zamboanga and Borneo until returning to Cavite to decommission on 30 April 1907.

=== 1908–1915 ===
Pampanga was loaned to the Army for use as a patrol boat and ferry about Corregidor Island in Manila Bay on 31 December 1908 and was returned to the Navy on 11 November 1910. She recommissioned on 12 April 1911 and then sailed to cruise the Southern Philippines. On 24 September, the gunboat arrived off Semut, Basilan Island, and landed a detachment under Ensign Charles E. Hovey to take supplies to Army Camp Tabla inland. En route, the small party was attacked by natives, killing Ensign Hovey and injuring three of his men. Retaliatory action by the Army troops punished the attackers. The warship remained on patrol in the southern Philippines until decommissioning at Olongapo on 31 May 1915.

=== 1916–1928 ===
Once again commissioned on 3 January 1916 at Hong Kong, China, Pampanga was attached to the Asiatic Fleet and began duty on the South China Patrol station, investigating Chinese political conditions and offering assistance to Americans in danger or need. In the course of her service, she cruised the West River to Canton and beyond protecting American interests, especially in the period of heavy unrest in the middle 1920s, and made frequent visits to Hong Kong, Swatow, and the other ports of the area in the performance of her duty. In 1923 she was under the command of Earl Winfield Spencer Jr., a naval aviator who was at that time the husband of Wallis Simpson, who in turn was later the lover and wife of Prince Edward, Duke of Windsor and the cause of the Edward VIII abdication crisis.

The warship remained on this station until decommissioned at Hong Kong on 6 November 1928, and on 21 November, was sunk by gunfire from Asheville and Sacramento off the China coast after being stripped of all usable gear.

== Awards ==
- Navy Expeditionary Medal
- Philippine Campaign Medal
- World War I Victory Medal
