= USS Samar (PG-41) =

Gunboat of the United States Navy

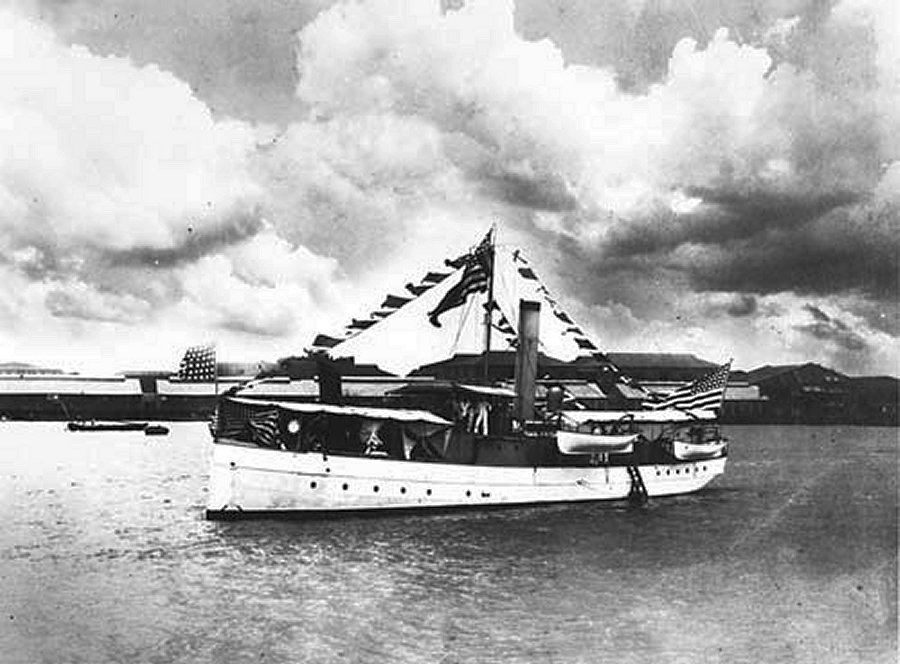

History

United States
- Name: USS Samar
- Namesake: Samar, an island in the Philippines
- Acquired: 9 November 1898
- Commissioned: 26 May 1899
- Decommissioned: 6 September 1920
- Fate: Sold on 11 January 1921

General characteristics
- Displacement: 243 tons
- Length: 121 ft
- Beam: 17 ft 10 in
- Draft: 7 ft 6 in
- Speed: 10.5 knots
- Complement: 28
- Armament: 1 × 6-pounder gun; 1 × 3-pounder gun; 2 × 1-pounder guns

USS Samar (PG-41) was a gunboat of the United States Navy. She was initially built for the Spanish Navy, but was captured during the Spanish–American War and taken into service with the US Navy. Samar had two sister-ships which also served in the US Navy, USS Pampanga (PG-39) and USS Paragua.

== Spanish career ==
Samar was launched in November 1887 by the Manila Ship Co., Canacao, Philippine Islands. She was captured on 9 November 1898 at Zamboanga by US Army personnel, brought to Manila between 13 and 20 April 1899 and commissioned at Manila on 26 May 1899, under the command of Ensign George C. Day.

== US career ==
=== Philippines ===
Following local operations out of Manila that summer, Samar patrolled off Negros and Panay, assisting Army operations ashore. In November the gunboat helped escort an Army Expeditionary Brigade under Brigadier General Lloyd Wheaton to San Fabian in Lingayen Gulf, then firing on insurgent entrenchments on the landing beaches. The gunboat served out of Vigan in northwestern Luzon into the new year, cruising on patrols, carrying detachments of troops and maintaining communications in the region. On 24 April 1900 the gunboat carried Brigadier General Young on a tour of inspection from San Fernando to Vigan. In May, Samar carried pay and supplies to Bojeador lighthouse and, in June, carried a detachment of the 33d Infantry from Aparri to Kandon. Returning to Aparri, the crew spent a few days scaling the boiler and overhauling the engines before conducting a survey of the Kagayen River with USS Bennington 20–21 June. Following a short overhaul at the Cavite Naval Station, the gunboat sailed south to Zamboanga in southwestern Mindanao, where she patrolled from Cebu in the north to the Jolo island group in the south into 1901. Admiral John A. Schofield, then an Ensign commanding Samar, later wrote the gunboat captured a banca in a cove off Paragua and rescued two "fair young maidens" who had been kidnapped by bandits from the town of Puerto Princesa. At the start of the rainy season that summer, the gunboat proceeded to Cavite, Luzon, for boiler repairs and was decommissioned on 23 September 1901.

Recommissioned on 19 June 1902, Lt. Montgomery M. Taylor in command, Samar steamed south to Zamboanga, Mindanao, where she carried messages and stores for Marine detachments assisting the Army in suppressing the Moro rebellions among the southern islands. She patrolled the Sulu Archipelago as well, visiting ports throughout the island group and stopped for coal at Sandakan in British Borneo as required. The gunboat returned to Cavite in December, in preparation for fleet maneuvers with the Southern Squadron of the Asiatic Fleet in January 1903. After fitting out for survey work at Canacao in February, Samar began hydrographic surveys off southern Mindanao area, conducting an extensive survey of Polloc harbor before supporting Army operations at Simpetan. Following the closing of the Naval Station at Polloc in June 1904, the gunboat returned to Cavite and decommissioned there on 22 August 1904.

=== Yangtze service ===
Recommissioned on 11 March 1908, Ensign Reed M. Fawell in command, Samar was assigned to the Pacific Fleet's Third Squadron, which mainly patrolled the Yangtze River and along the Chinese coast in the vicinity of Guangzhou. The Squadrons' purpose was to protect American missionaries, businessmen and shipping in the free-trade ports along China's coast and major rivers, concessions for trade and missionary activity the result of so-called "unequal treaties" forced on the Chinese government following the Boxer Rebellion. The gunboat sailed from Manila in mid-April, arriving at Hong Kong on 18 April. Assigned to Chinese river service, the gunboat patrolled the Pearl River delta between Hong Kong, Macau and Guangzhou, patrolled the Xi River up to Wuzhou and cruised along the Chinese coast north to Shantou and Amoy. Every year the gunboat also sailed north to Nimrod Sound, outside Ningbo, Zhejiang province, for target practice near the Imperial Chinese Navy's gunnery school.

In late 1909 the gunboat changed station to Shanghai, where she regularly patrolled the lower Yangtze up to Nanjing and Wuhu. Following an anti-foreign riots in Changsha in April 1910, which destroyed a number of missions and merchant warehouses, Samar sailed up the Yangtze River to Hankou and then Changsha to show the flag and help restore order. The gunboat was also administratively assigned to the Asiatic Fleet that year, which had been re-established by the Navy to better protect, in the words of the Bureau of Navigation, "American interests in the Orient." After returning to Shanghai in August, she sailed up river again the following summer, passing Wuhu in June but then running aground off Kichau on 1 July 1911. After staying stuck in the mud for two weeks, Samar broke free and sailed back down river to coal ship. Returning upriver, the gunboat reached Hankou in August and Yichang in September where she wintered over owing to both the dry season and the outbreak of rebellion at Wuchang in October 1911. Following the collapse of the Qing dynasty and the declaration of the Republic of China by Sun Yat-sen that winter, tensions eased and the gunboat turned downriver in July 1912, arriving at Shanghai in October. Samar patrolled the lower Yangtze after fighting broke out in the summer 1913, a precursor to a decade of conflict between provincial warlords in China. Following another cruise upriver to Hankou in February 1914, the gunboat returned to Shanghai for an overhaul in March.

== Final years ==
Samar remained on the China Station throughout World War I, then, in July 1919, was placed on the disposal list at Shanghai following a collision with a Yangtze river steamer that damaged her bow. A year later, she was designated PG-41, but was ordered inspected and appraised for sale the same day, 17 July 1920. The following month she returned to Cavite, where she was decommissioned on 6 September 1920 and sold on 11 January 1921.

== See also ==
- List of patrol vessels of the United States Navy
