= John F. Goodman =

United States Marine Corps three-star general

John Floyd Goodman
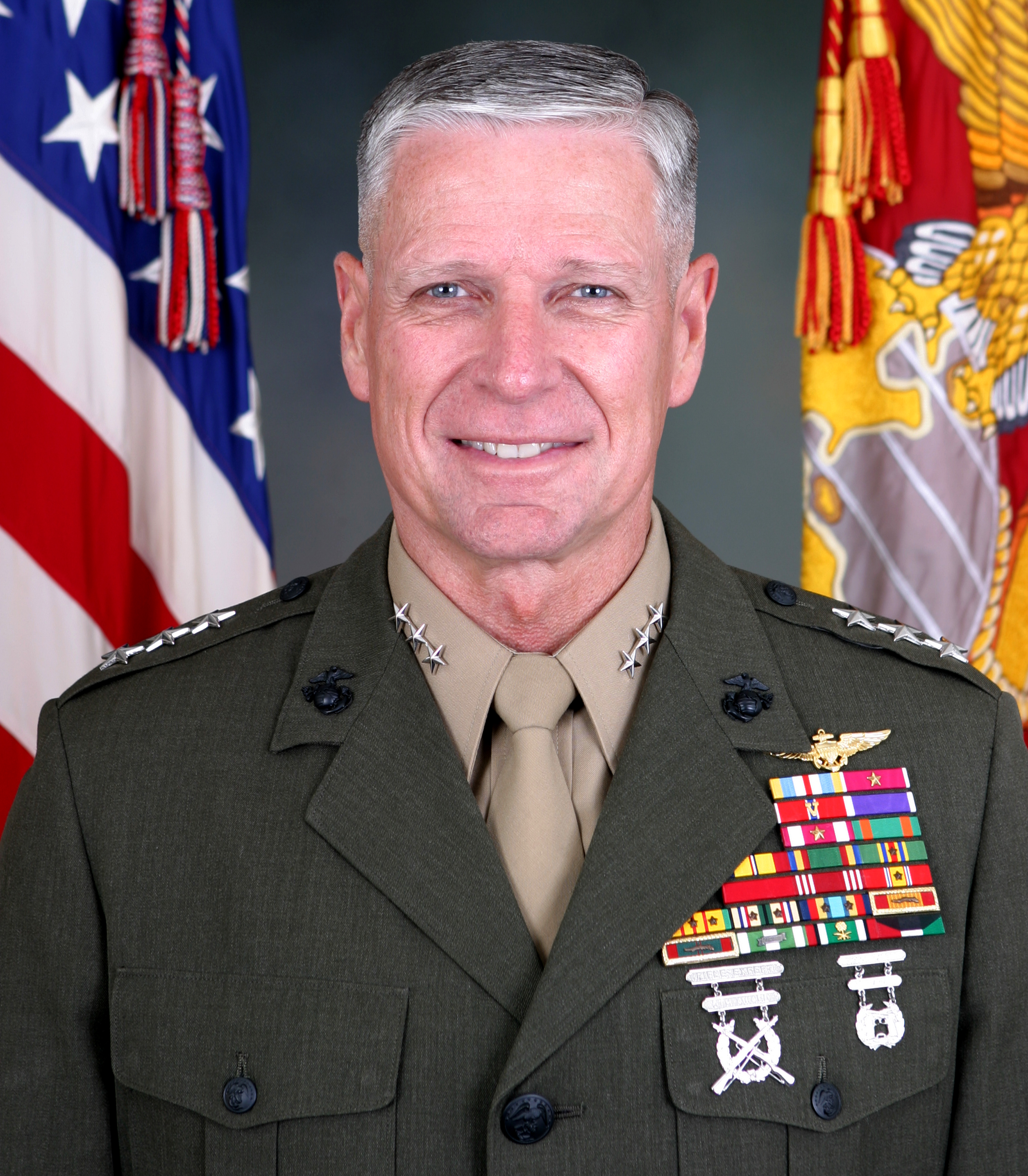
- Born: November 5, 1945 (age 80); Sacramento, California, U.S.
- Military career
- Allegiance: United States of America
- Branch: United States Army; United States Marine Corps
- Service years: 1967–1971, 1971–2008
- Rank: Lieutenant general
- Nicknames: "Hustler", "Shadow"
- Commands: VMFA-531; MAG-41; 2nd Marine Expeditionary Brigade; 1st Marine Aircraft Wing; Marine Forces Korea; Marine Forces Pacific
- Conflicts: Vietnam War; Persian Gulf War
- Awards: Navy Distinguished Service Medal; Defense Superior Service Medal (3); Legion of Merit (2); Soldier's Medal; Bronze Star w/ "V" Device; Purple Heart
- Other work: Director of U.S. Department of Defense's Center for Excellence in Disaster Management and Humanitarian Assistance; Advisor & Subject Matter Expert for U.S. Special Inspector General for Afghanistan Reconstruction.

John Floyd Goodman (born November 5, 1945) is a retired United States Marine Corps three-star general. He began his military service with the U.S. Army during the Vietnam War, during which he earned the Soldier's Medal, the Bronze Star with "V" Device and a Purple Heart. He entered the U.S. Marine Corps in 1971, becoming an aviator. He flew over 4,100 hours during his years of service. He retired from military service in 2008, with over 41 years of active and reserve service, achieving a rank of lieutenant general.

== Early life and education ==
Goodman was born and raised in Sacramento County, California. He is the youngest of 4 children, and has a sister and twin brothers. He played football, basketball, and baseball while attending Encina High School. As the varsity quarterback, he earned All Conference, All City, All Sacramento County, and All Superior California honors his senior year. Goodman was also selected to the Sacramento All City and All County baseball teams. Goodman graduated from high school in 1963. He was offered athletic scholarships to a number of universities, including USC. During signing week, he chose to attend Arizona State University.

At Arizona State University, Goodman was the Sun Devil starting quarterback in 1965 and 1966, leading the team in total offense both years. He also played baseball starting in his sophomore year. He earned a Bachelor of Science in Business Administration and Accounting, graduating in 1967. He was invited to the New Orleans Saints rookie camp.

After graduation, as he was preparing to leave for camp, he received his military draft notice. He reported to rookie camp, made the Saints team, and then deferred playing football while he was on "government loan".

== Career ==
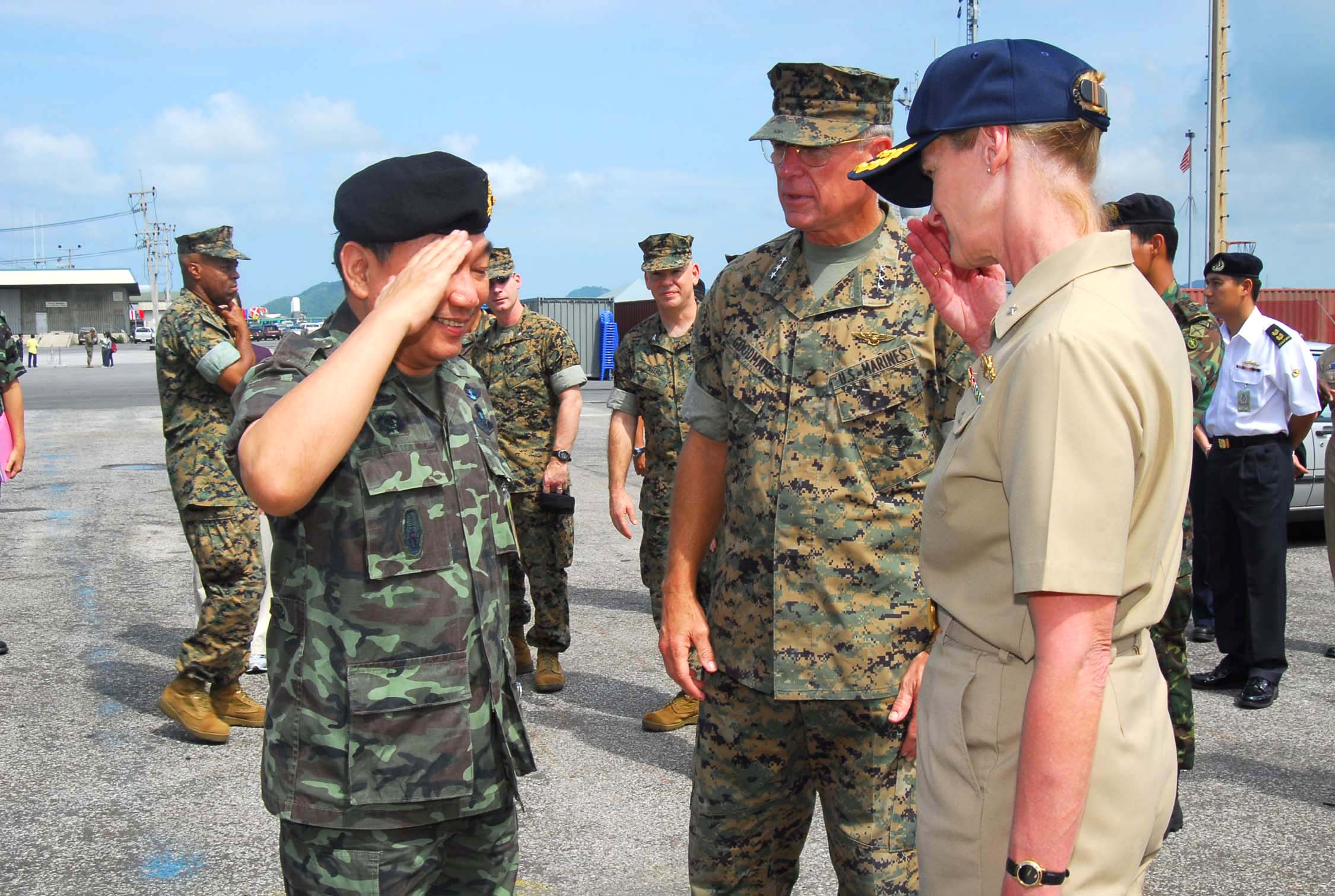
U.S. Navy officer Carol M. Pottenger salutes Thai military officer Kemarat Kanchanawat, alongside Goodman in 2007.

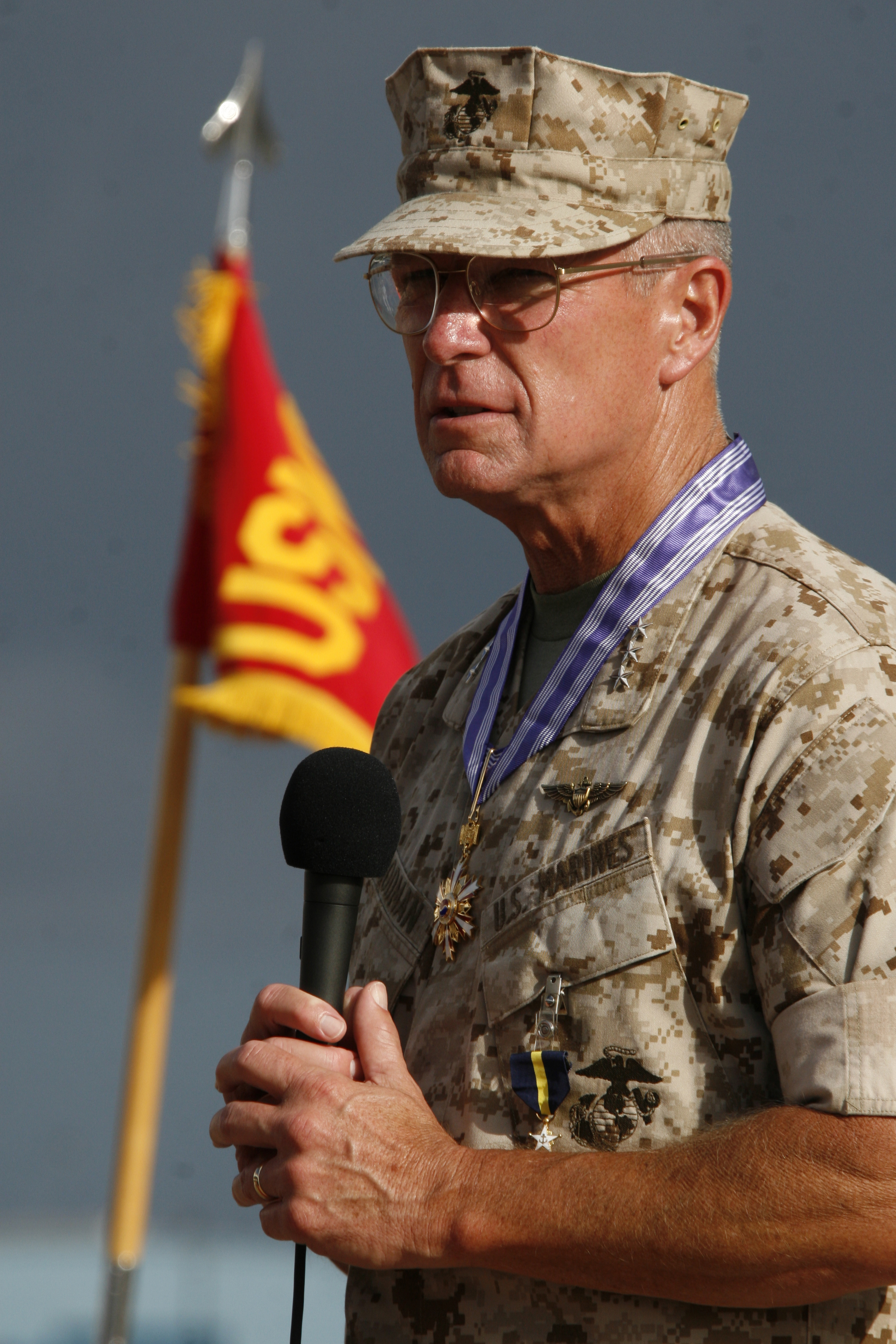
Goodman as the commander of U.S. Marine Corps Forces, Pacific, speaks about his 41 years of service during his change of command and retirement ceremony, 2008.

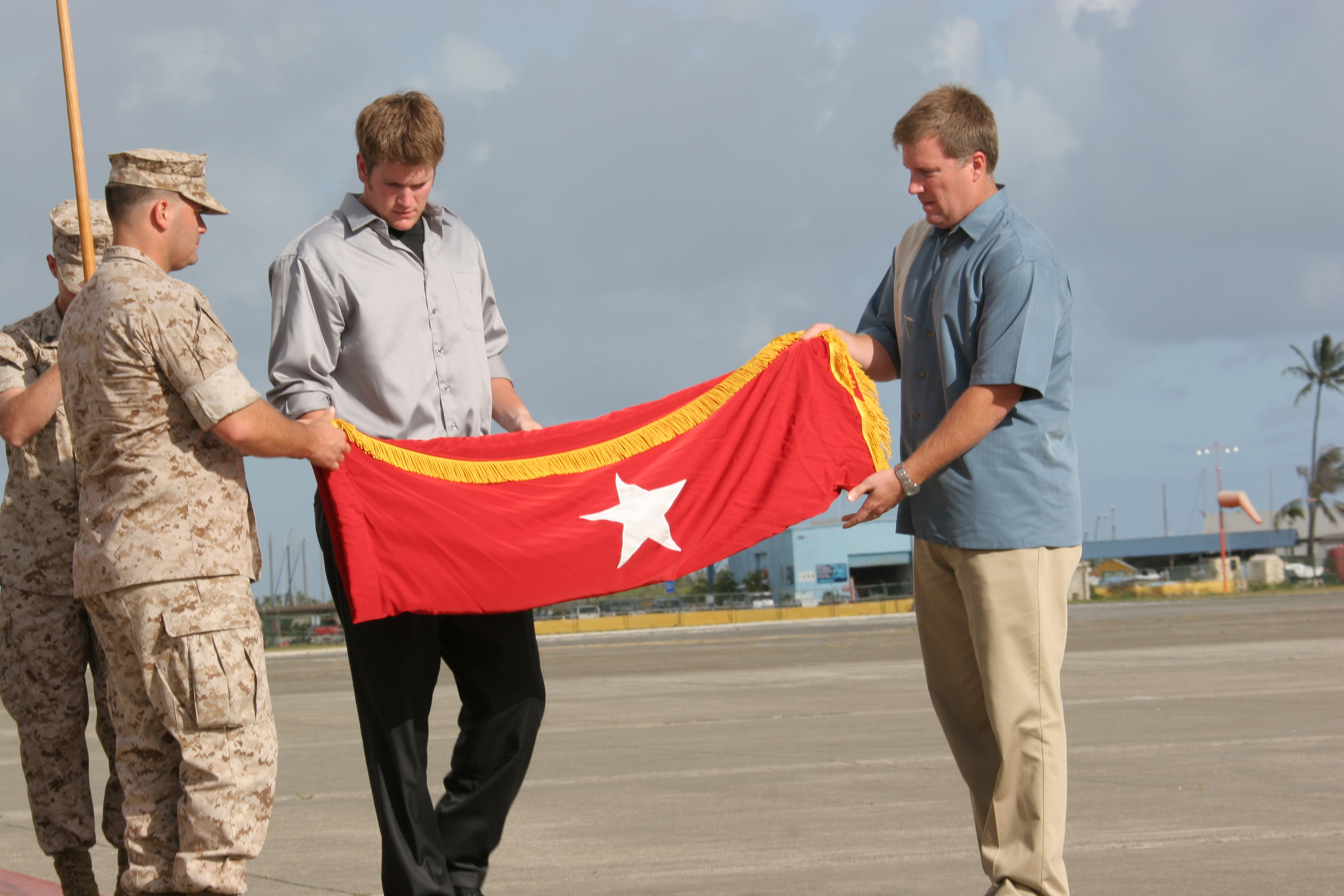
From left to right: Jeff Goodman, Michael Goodman, and John Goodman II, the sons of Goodman, who was commander of U.S. Marine Corps Forces, Pacific at the time, fold their father's three-star flag during the MarForPac change of command and retirement ceremony. Their father also retired after 41 years of military service.

=== U.S. Army and the Vietnam War ===
Goodman began his military service in 1967 in the U.S. Army. His first combat tour was in South Vietnam as a member of a 1st Infantry Division Long Range Reconnaissance Patrol team. He earned a Bronze Star with "V" Device, the Soldier's Medal, and the Purple Heart while in the Vietnam War. He transferred to the U.S. Army Reserve in 1969.

=== Professional football ===
Goodman was drafted by the New Orleans Saints in 1967, before he left for service in South Vietnam. He had to defer until returning from active duty service. Goodman played professional football for the very briefly prior to entering the United States Marine Corps in 1971. His football career ended after a clavicle injury.

=== Marine Corps service ===
Goodman did not find working in the corporate world to his liking. "I needed to be working toward something more important than myself or a bottom line." In 1971, he joined the United States Marine Corps.

Following his commissioning in December 1971, Goodman became a Naval Aviator in May 1973 at Naval Air Station Meridian, and was assigned to Marine Corps Air Station Yuma, where he completed flight training in the A-4 Skyhawk. In November 1973 he was assigned to Marine Attack Squadron 223. He later served as a Forward Air Controller with 3rd Battalion 6th Marines at Camp Lejuene. He graduated from the Marine Corps Weapons and Tactics Instructor School, the United States Air Force Weapons School, and United States Navy Fighter Weapons School (also known as TOPGUN). In 1979, he transferred to MAWTS-1 as an instructor and the A-4 Department Head. After graduating with honors from Marine Corps Command and Staff College, Goodman reported to Marine Corps Air Station El Toro, and he served as the operations officer for VMA-214; and later as the director of safety, standardization, and tactics for Marine Aircraft Group 13.

From 1985 to 1986, Goodman was the Assistant Division Air Officer for 3d Marine Division, then returned to El Toro after conversion training to the F/A-18 Hornet. After serving as the executive officer of the VMFA-531, the Assistant Group Operations Officer for Marine Combat Crew Readiness Training Group 10, and the group operations officer for Marine Aircraft Group 11, he assumed command of VMFA-531 on 28 October 1988.

In June 1990, he went to Marine Corps Base Quantico, as a member of the first class of the Marine Corps War College. During the academic year, he served as the Air Plans Officer for I Marine Expeditionary Force in Kuwait for the Gulf War. Following end of hostilities, he completed War College and was assigned as the director of the School of Advanced Warfighting.

In July 1993, Goodman assumed command of Marine Aircraft Group 41 at Naval Air Station Dallas. In July 1995, he returned to Quantico as the deputy director of the MAGTF Staff Training Program. Promoted to brigadier general in May 1997, he assumed the position of director, strategy, policy and plans (J5) of United States Southern Command in June 1997, becoming the chief of staff in May 1998. In July 1999, he returned to Quantico as the director, Warfighting Development Integration Division.

He was frocked to major general in June 2001 and took command of the 2nd Marine Expeditionary Brigade on 6 July 2001. From 5 August 2002 until 3 June 2004, he commanded the 1st Marine Aircraft Wing at Okinawa. Goodman also served as the commander, Marine Forces Korea and assistant chief of staff, U/C/J-5, United Nations Command, Combined Forces Command, and United States Forces Korea from June 4, 2004, until June 17, 2005. On June 20, 2005, he reported for duty as deputy commander, and later as the commander of, Marine Forces Pacific.

Goodman logged more than 4100 hours in tactical jet aircraft while in the Marine Corps.

==== Joint Task Force Caring Response ====
In 2008, after Cyclone Nargis ravaged Burma, Goodman commanded U.S. Joint Task Force Caring Response. Goodman, on numerous occasions, offered Burma's military government the use of helicopters and surface craft to support humanitarian relief efforts in the most difficult-to-reach areas of the Irrawaddy Delta. The U.S. flew more than 116 flights, delivering more than 2.2 million pounds of needed relief supplies to the Rangoon hub.

==== Other notable work ====
As MARFORPAC commander, Goodman also led the development of U.S. Pacific Command's Consequence Support Force 503 functional plan to address the United States' military response to the threat of an Avian Influenza Pandemic outbreak in the Asia-Pacific region.

On September 25, 2007, Goodman conducted the promotion ceremony for Jim Nabors at Fort DeRussy in Honolulu, Hawaii. Nabors, who played PFC Gomer Pyle on a TV show of the same name, was promoted to Honorary Corporal in the United States Marine Corps based on his outstanding contributions to the Marine Corps and the United States.

==== Retirement ====
On August 22, 2008, Goodman retired after over 41 years of active and reserve military service. At his retirement/change of command ceremony, held on the flight line at U.S. Marine Corps Base Hawaii, Kaneohe Bay, Hawaii, CMC General James Conway said of LtGen. Goodman: (Being) the commandant has lots of things that cause you to wake up at three in the morning and stare at the ceiling, but one of those, frankly the last three years, has not been Marine Forces, Pacific, because we know of the command team that we have in place".

=== Post–Marine Corps career ===
==== Disaster preparedness and response ====
On October 17, 2008, Goodman became the director of the U.S. Department of Defense's Center for Excellence in Disaster Management and Humanitarian Assistance, "responsible for educating, training and preparing U.S. military and international governments in disaster preparedness and response." Goodman participated in the 994th Wilton Park Conference, "The Use of Military Assets in the Humanitarian Response to Natural Disasters" held 28–30 September 2009 in West Sussex, United Kingdom. General Goodman chaired the sessions focusing on the strategic importance of collaborative partnerships.

Goodman currently is an advisor and subject matter expert with the U.S. Special Inspector General for Afghanistan Reconstruction (SIGAR), where he addresses the "effectiveness and efficiency in the U.S.-funded reconstruction program in Afghanistan."

==== Civilian advisory positions ====
Goodman served as the chairman of the board of advisors for Tactical Edge, Inc. -- a service-disabled veteran-owned software company—from March 2012 through December 2013.

Goodman is a member of ASU's Flag Officer Advisory Council.

== Personal life ==
Goodman married Gayle Stevenson in 1967 before leaving for Vietnam. They have three sons — two of their sons served in the Marine Corps.

=== Civilian honors ===
In 1963, Goodman was selected to the Sacramento City, Country, and Superior California All Star Football Team. He was also selected to the Sacramento City and Sacramento Country All Star Baseball Teams. In September 1963 Goodman was inducted into the Sacramento County Football Hall of Fame, as the 1962–63 Sacramento County Quarterback.

On October 29, 2010, Goodman was honored, along with all Sun Devil Quarterbacks, at a Legends Luncheon hosted by the Arizona State University Alumni Association and Sun Devil Club. Other honorees included Danny White, Andrew Walter, Jake Plummer, and Jeff van Raaphorst.

On April 29, 2011, Goodman was the 1st inductee into the Encina High School Hall of Fame. Goodman was inducted into the San Juan School District Hall of Fame on November 1, 2013.

On November 20, 2015, Goodman was highlighted as part of the Pac-12 Conference's Centennial celebration. The Conference highlighted 100 Pac-12 student-athlete alumni who have had tremendous success off the field of play—in their careers and in their communities.

== Award and decorations ==

Badge	Naval Aviator Badge			
1st row	Navy Distinguished Service Medal		Defense Superior Service Medal with two bronze oak leaf clusters|	
2nd row	Legion of Merit with one gold award star	Soldier's Medal	Bronze Star w/ "V" Device	Purple Heart
3rd row	Meritorious Service Medal w/ gold star	Navy and Marine Corps Achievement Medal	Combat Action Ribbon	Navy Unit Commendation w/ 2 stars
4th row	Navy Meritorious Unit Commendation w/ 2 stars	Army Meritorious Unit Commendation	Army Good Conduct Medal	National Defense Service Medal w/ 2 service stars
4th row	Vietnam Service Medal w/ 3 stars	Southwest Asia Service Medal w/ 2 stars	Global War on Terrorism Service Medal	Korea Defense Service Medal
5th row	Navy Sea Service Deployment Ribbon w/ 2 service stars	South Korean Order of National Security Merit, Gukseon Medal	South Korean Order of National Security Merit, Cheonsu Medal	Vietnam Gallantry Cross Unit Citation
6th row	Vietnam Civil Actions Medal, Unit Citation	Vietnam Campaign Medal	Kuwait Liberation Medal (Saudi Arabia)	Kuwait Liberation Medal (Kuwait)

- Goodman also received several awards of both the Rifle and Pistol Expert badges.

== See also ==
- List of United States Marine Corps aircraft wings
- List of 1st Marine Aircraft Wing Commanders

Military offices
Preceded by BGen Robert M. Flanagan	Commanding General, 2nd Marine Expeditionary Brigade (United States); 2001 – 2002	Succeeded by MajGen Richard F. Natonski
Preceded by MajGen James Cartwright	Commanding General, 1st Marine Aircraft Wing; 2002 – 2004	Succeeded by MajGen Duane D. Thiessen
Preceded by MajGen Timothy E. Donovan	Commander, Marine Forces, Korea; 2004 – 2005	Succeeded by MajGen Duane D. Thiessen
Preceded by LtGen Wallace C. Gregson	Commander, Marine Forces Pacific; 2005 – 2008	Succeeded by LtGen Keith J. Stalder
