= USS Mustin (DDG-89) =

US Navy Arleigh Burke-class destroyer

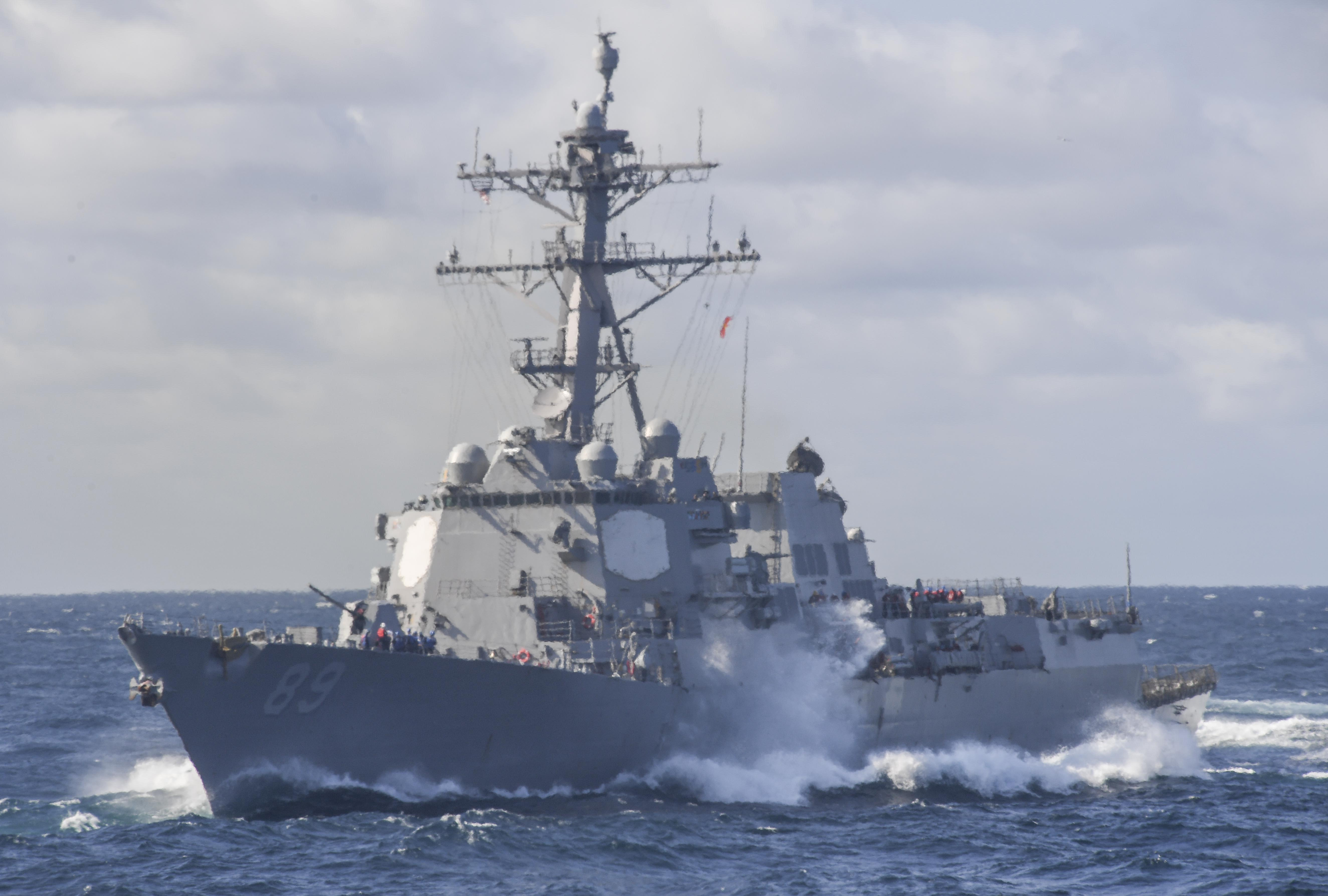
- USS Mustin on 26 May 2017

History

United States
- Name: Mustin
- Namesake: Mustin family
- Ordered: 6 March 1998
- Builder: Ingalls Shipbuilding
- Laid down: 15 January 2001
- Launched: 12 December 2001
- Commissioned: 26 July 2003
- Home port: Yokosuka
- Identification: MMSI number: 369921000; Callsign: NHMH; Hull number: DDG-89
- Motto: Toujours L'Audace; "Always Be Bold"
- Honours and awards: See Awards
- Status: in active service
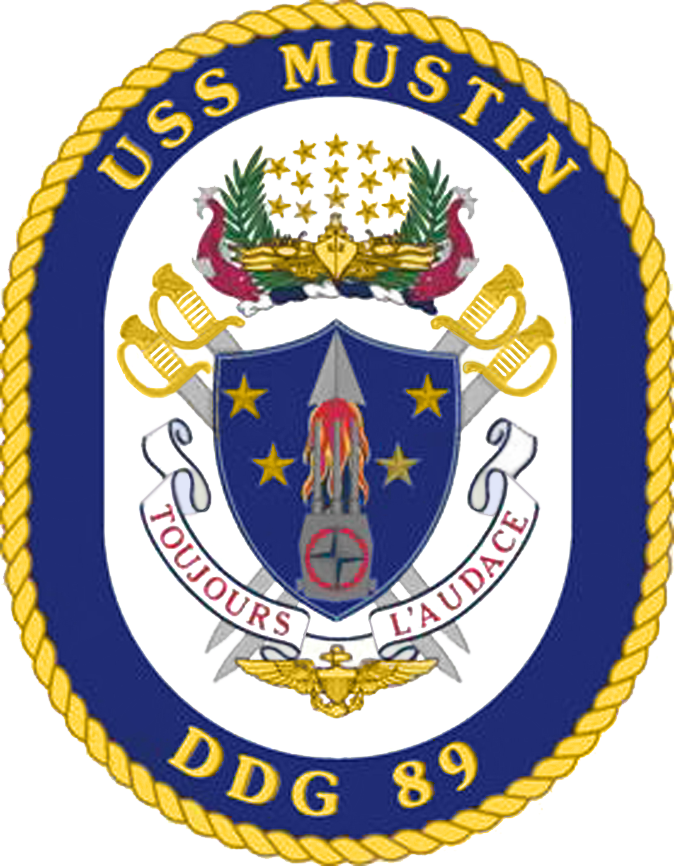
- Badge

General characteristics
- Class & type: Arleigh Burke-class destroyer
- Displacement: 9,200 tons
- Length: 509 ft 6 in (155.30 m)
- Beam: 66 ft (20 m)
- Draft: 31 ft (9.4 m)
- Propulsion: 4 × General Electric LM2500-30 gas turbines, 2 shafts, 100,000 shp (75 MW)
- Speed: exceeds 30 knots (56 km/h; 35 mph)
- Complement: 380 officers and enlisted
- Armament: Guns: 1 × 5-inch (127 mm)/62 Mk 45 Mod 4 (lightweight gun); 1 × 20 mm (0.8 in) Phalanx CIWS; 2 × 25 mm (0.98 in) Mk 38 machine gun system; 4 × 0.50 in (12.7 mm) caliber guns; Missiles: 1 × 32-cell, 1 × 64-cell (96 total cells) Mk 41 vertical launching system (VLS): RIM-66M surface-to-air missile; RIM-156 surface-to-air missile; RIM-174A Standard ERAM; RIM-161 anti-ballistic missile; RIM-162 ESSM (quad-packed); BGM-109 Tomahawk cruise missile; RUM-139 vertical launch ASROC; Torpedoes: 2 × Mark 32 triple torpedo tubes: Mark 46 lightweight torpedo; Mark 50 lightweight torpedo; Mark 54 lightweight torpedo
- Aircraft carried: 2 × MH-60R Seahawk helicopters

USS Mustin (DDG-89) is an Arleigh Burke-class (Flight IIA) Aegis guided missile destroyer in the United States Navy. She is named in honor of the Mustin family who have devoted over a century to US Naval service. Mustin was the 18th ship of this class to be built at Ingalls Shipbuilding in Pascagoula, Mississippi, and construction began on 15 January 2001. She was launched on 12 December 2001 and was christened on 15 December 2001. On 26 July 2003, a twilight commissioning ceremony was held at the Naval Air Station North Island in San Diego, California.

== Namesakes ==
Often referred to as "The Father of Naval Aviation", Captain Henry C. Mustin (1874–1923), a graduate of the US Naval Academy (class of 1896), was the principal architect for the concept of the catapult launch. He married Corinne DeForest Montague, great-granddaughter of Commodore Arthur Sinclair, and a first cousin and close confidante of Wallis Simpson. Simpson gained notoriety for her controversial relationship with King Edward VIII of Great Britain who abdicated his crown to marry her in 1936. The Mustins had three children: Lloyd M., Henry A. and Gordon S.

As a Lieutenant Commander in January 1914, Mustin established Naval Aeronautic Station Pensacola, the Navy's first permanent air station together with a flight school, and became its first Commanding Officer. The first flight was made from the station on 2 February by Lieutenant J. H. Towers and Ensign G. de Chevalier. On 5 November 1915, while underway, Lieutenant Commander Mustin successfully flew an AB-2 flying boat off the stern of armored cruiser USS North Carolina in Pensacola Bay, Florida, making the first ever recorded catapult launch from a ship underway. In 1899, he earned a commendation for distinguished service in the capture of Vigan, Philippines. The first operational missions of naval aircraft were flown under his command during the Veracruz operation in 1914 and he was the first to hold the title: Commander, Aircraft Squadrons, Pacific Fleet. Designated Naval Aviator Number Eleven, Captain Mustin was instrumental in the design of the Naval Aviator insignia.

His eldest son, Vice Admiral Lloyd M. Mustin (1911–1999), also a Naval Academy graduate (class of 1932), took part in developing the Navy's first lead-computing anti-aircraft gun sight, which proved of major importance in the air-sea actions of World War II, and served on the cruiser USS Atlanta during the naval battle of Guadalcanal. His ship was lost during that action, but he and other survivors landed on shore and he then served with a naval unit attached to the 1st Marine Division. His post-war service included commands at sea and development and evaluation of weapon systems. He later served as director of operations for the Joint Chiefs of Staff.

Vice Admiral Mustin's two sons, Vice Admiral Henry C. Mustin and Lieutenant Commander Thomas M. Mustin continued their family's tradition of military service. Vice Admiral Henry Mustin, another graduate of the Naval Academy (class of 1955), was a decorated Vietnam veteran who served in the 1980s as the Naval Inspector General, Commander, Second Fleet and Deputy Chief of Naval Operations for Plans and Policy. Lieutenant Commander Mustin, also a Naval Academy graduate (class of 1962), earned a Bronze Star during the Vietnam War for river patrol combat action.

Vice Admiral Henry Mustin's son John Burton Mustin (born 1967), a Naval Academy graduate (class of 1990), is a United States Navy vice admiral who currently serves as Chief of Navy Reserve since 7 August 2020. He previously served as the Vice Commander of the Fleet Forces Command.

== Service history ==
=== 2005–2011 ===
On 1 February 2005, Mustin began her maiden deployment and returned on 1 August.

In July 2006, Mustin and her crew of 300 were deployed to Yokosuka Naval Base in Japan, home of the Navy's Seventh Fleet, for permanent assignment. Though this was during the same month as the North Korea missile tests, the deployment was unrelated.

During the 2008 Cyclone Nargis crisis in Myanmar and the subsequent Joint Task Force Caring Response aid mission, Mustin, then as part of the USS Essex Amphibious Ready Group (ARG), which including USS Juneau and USS Harpers Ferry, stood by off Burma from 13 May to 5 June, waiting for the Myanmar junta government to permit US aid to its citizens. However, in early June, with permission still not forthcoming, it was decided to return the ARG to its scheduled operations.

In March 2011, in company with aircraft carrier Ronald Reagan, Mustin was deployed off northeastern Honshu, Japan. The mission was to assist with relief efforts after the 2011 Tōhoku earthquake and tsunami.

During the 2011 Thailand floods, Mustin was docked at Port Laem Chabang on a routine visit when the Thai government requested the warship to prolong her stay for up to six days to provide aerial surveillance of the flooding. In response, The Pentagon gave permission for the two Seahawk helicopters, from HSL-51 detachment Six, to provide the imaging.

=== 2020–2026 ===
On 28 May 2020, Mustin conducted a freedom of navigation operation past the Paracel Islands, which the Navy said it "upheld the rights, freedoms, and lawful uses of the sea recognized in international law by challenging the restrictions on innocent passage imposed by China, Taiwan, and Vietnam and also by challenging China's claim to straight baselines enclosing the Paracel Islands".

On 19 December 2020, Mustin transited the contested Taiwan Strait, which the US Navy said was "in accordance with international law" to "demonstrate the US commitment to a free and open Indo-Pacific."

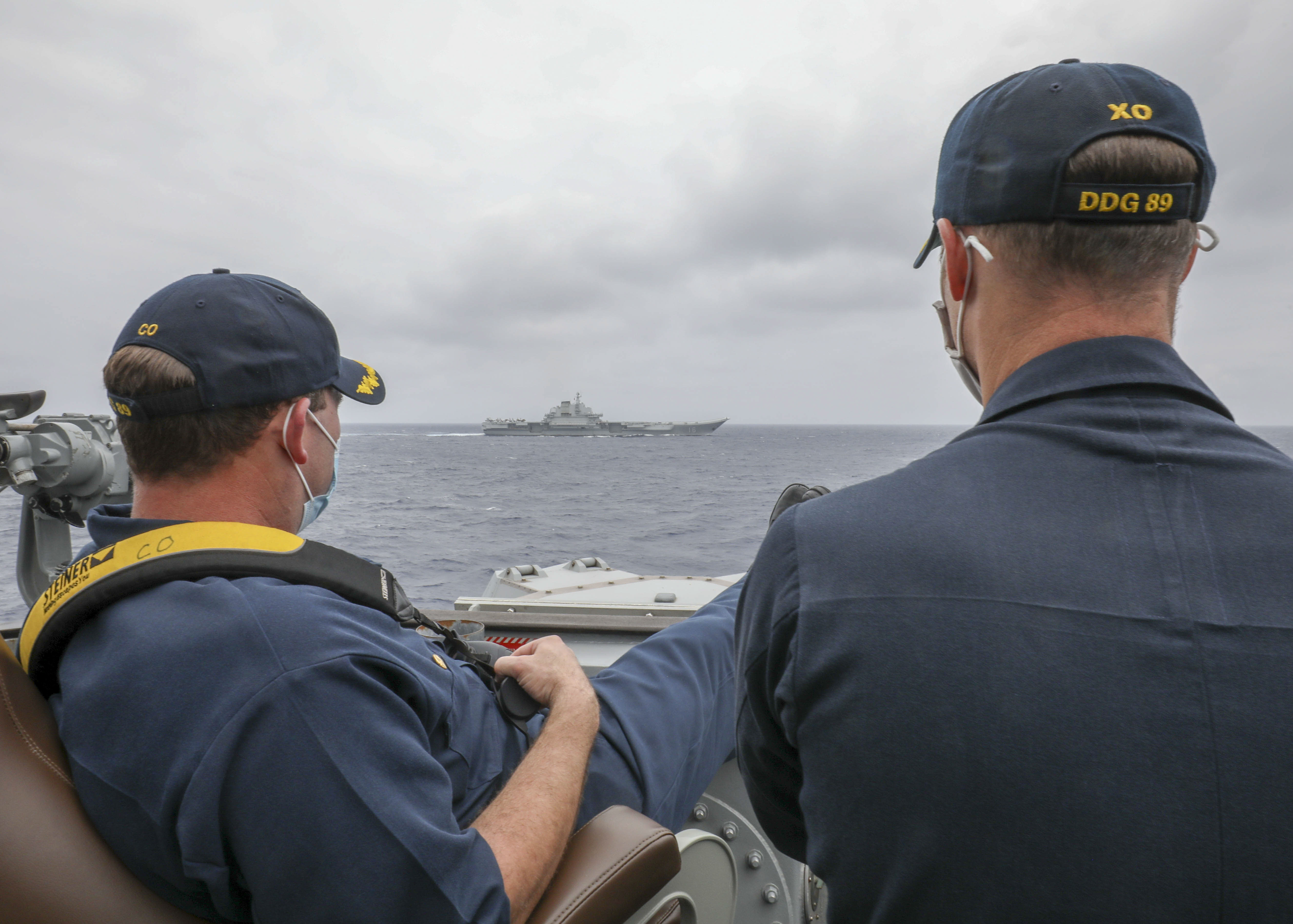
U.S. Navy sailors on the USS Mustin monitor the Chinese aircraft carrier Liaoning in April 2021

In Spring 2021, Mustin monitored Chinese aircraft carrier Liaoning after the latter sailed through the Miyako Strait, along with alleged Chinese militia boats amassed near Whitsun Reef in the Philippines. Liaoning entered the Philippine Sea immediately after the Whitsun Reef incident. On 4 April, Mustin approached Liaoning, maneuvred between her and her escorts, and photographed the commanding officer relaxing with his feet up, next to the executive officer with his arms crossed. Mustin was accused of "cognitive warfare" and was called "very vile." A quote from one media outlet described the incident as such;

"There are some photos that come to define the beginning of an era, and the Mustin photo has that feel. It perfectly encapsulates this moment in time as the US Navy, and the rest of the western world, looks on as China's military continues its meteoric rise. Liaoning, China's first carrier, is an excellent example of that."

Later, Vice Admiral Roy Kitchener claimed the photo was evidence that the carrier had "operating restrictions" with her escorts which allowed the US warship to get so close.

After completing a homeport shift from Yokosuka in July 2021, she is now part of Destroyer Squadron 1, based at San Diego, California.

The ship is expected to shift its homeport to Yokosuka again from San Diego in 2026, replacing USS Robert Smalls.

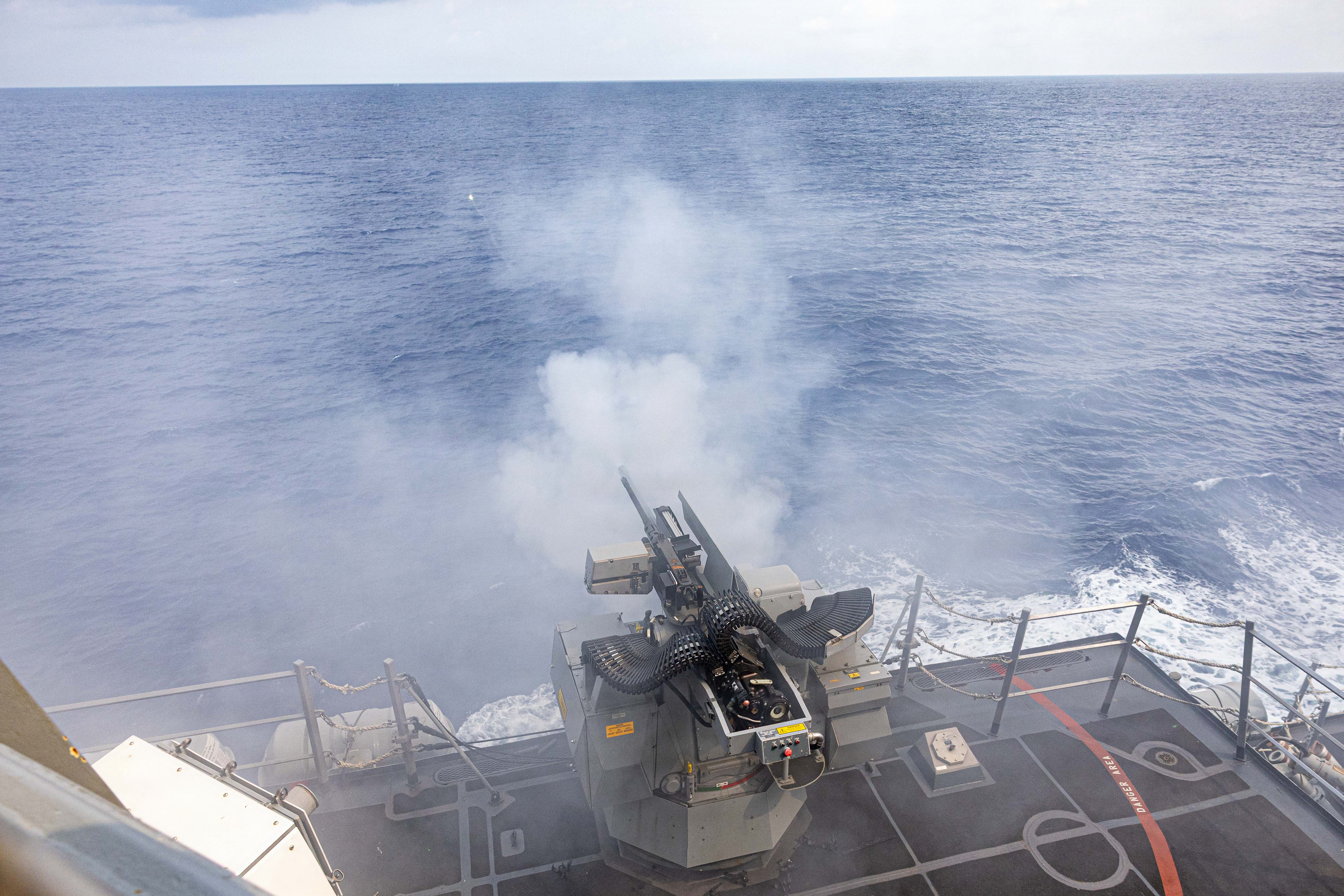
A Mk 38 Mod 4 being fired aboard USS Mustin

The Mustin is the first Arleigh Burke-class destroyer to receive the Mk 38 Mod 4 and conducted a live fire exercise in the South China Sea on April 17, 2026.

== Awards ==
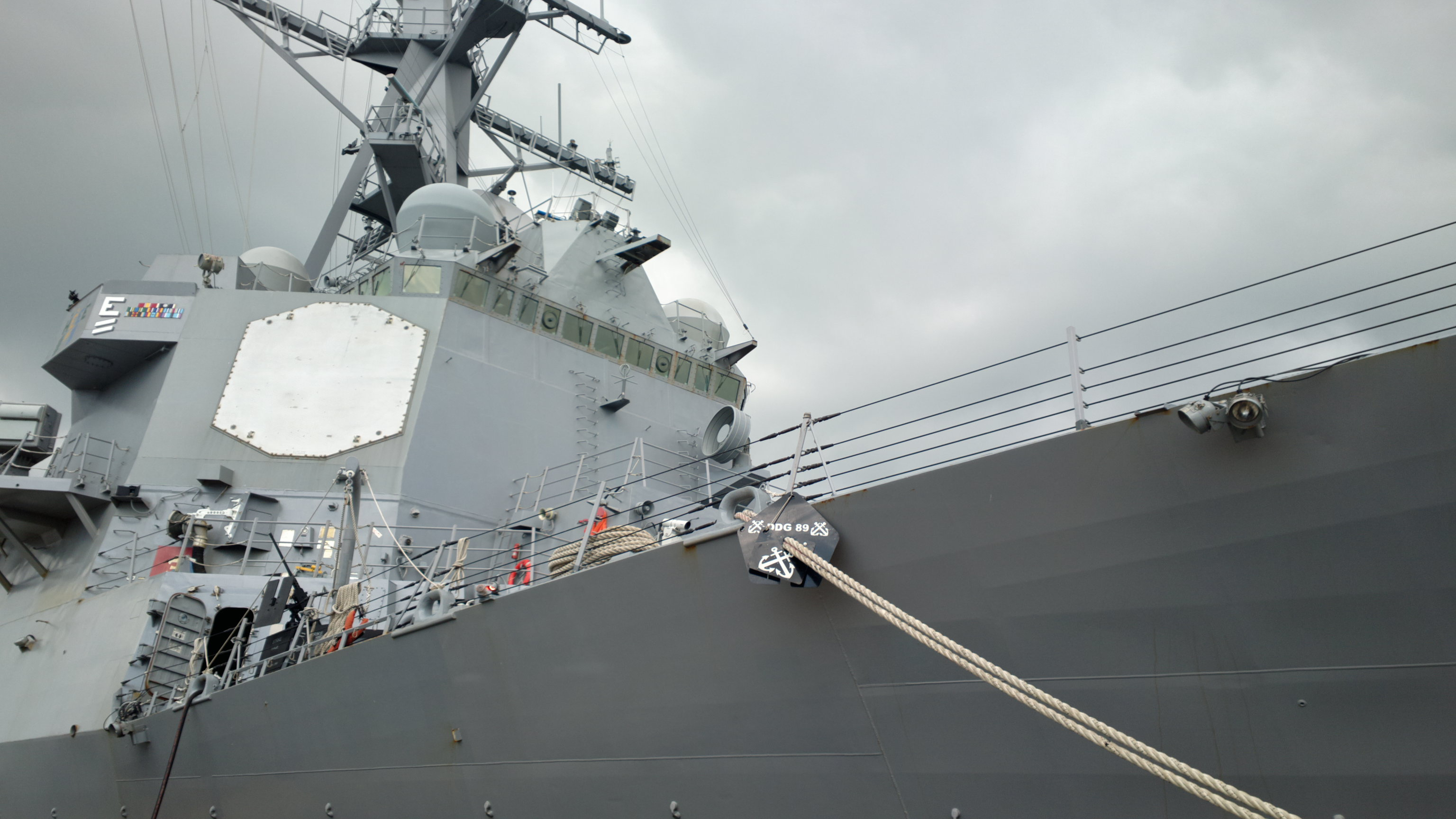
USS Mustin in 2015 with awards visible on the starboard bridge wing.

Mustin has been awarded the Navy E Ribbon for 2004, 2005, 2008, 2010, 2012, 2013, 2014, 2015, and 2018. Mustin also received the Humanitarian Service Medal for the 2011 Tōhoku earthquake and tsunami as well as Typhoon Haiyan. As part of Task Force 70, Mustin received the Meritorious Unit Commendation for 10 April 2012 to 31 December 2013.

- Chief of Naval Operations (CNO) Ship-Helicopter Safety Award - (2014)
- USS Arizona Memorial Trophy award - (2018)

== Coat of arms ==
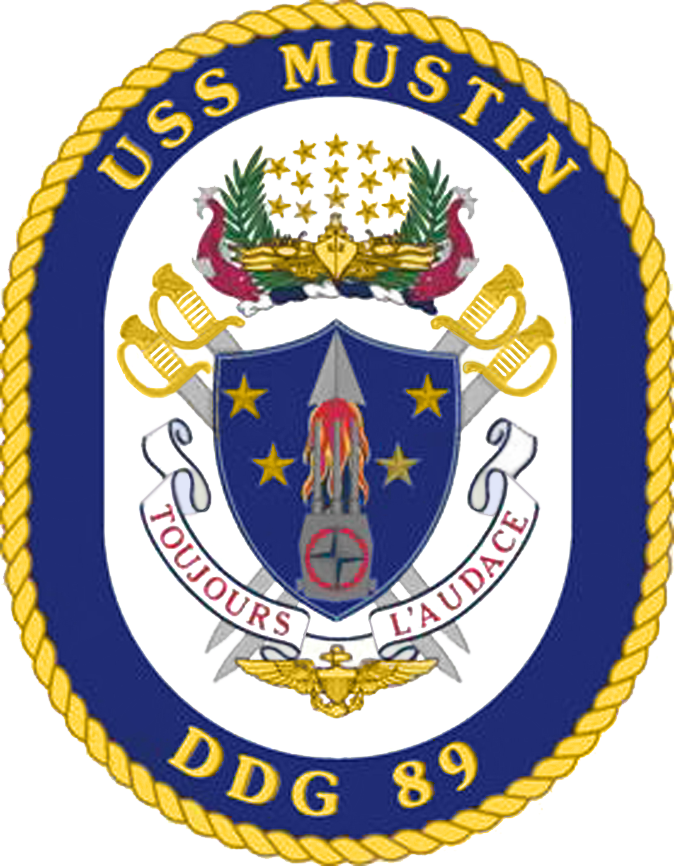

Shield

The shield has background of blue with four gold stars, an inflamed delta, a triple barreled battleship gun, annulet and polestar.

Crest

The crest consists thirteen stars over a Surface Warfare Officer device bounded by palm fronds and dolphins.

Motto

The motto is written on a scroll of white with blue trim.

The ship's motto is "Toujours L'Audace" or "Always be Bold".

Seal

The coat of arms in full color as in the blazon, upon a white background enclosed within a dark blue oval border edged on the outside with a gold rope and bearing the inscription "USS Mustin" at the top and "DDG 89" in the base all gold.
