= VMFA-531 =

Marine Fighter Attack Squadron 531
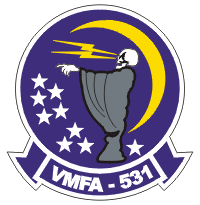
- VMFA-531 Insignia
- Active: 16 November 1942 – 27 March 1992
- Country: United States of America
- Branch: United States Marine Corps
- Type: Fighter/Attack
- Role: Close air support Air interdiction Aerial reconnaissance
- Part of: Inactive
- Nickname: "Grey Ghosts"
- Tail Code: EC
- Engagements: World War II; Cuban Missile Crisis; Vietnam War; Operation Eagle Claw

Commanders
- Notable commanders: LtCol Robert P. Keller; LtCol John F. Goodman; LtCol Keith Stalder

Aircraft flown
- Bomber: Lockheed PV-1 Ventura; Douglas SBD Dauntless; Curtiss SB2C Helldiver
- Fighter: Grumman F7F Tigercat; Douglas F3D Skynight; Douglas F4D Skyray; McDonnell-Douglas F-4 Phantom II; McDonnell-Douglas F/A-18 Hornet
- Trainer: North American SNJ; Brewster SB2A Buccaneer

Marine Fighter Attack Squadron 531 (VMFA-531) was a United States Marine Corps fighter squadron consisting of various types aircraft from its inception culminating with the F/A-18 Hornet. Known as the "Grey Ghosts", the squadron participated in action during World War II and the Vietnam War. They were decommissioned on 27 March 1992.

== History ==
=== World War II ===
Marine Night Fighter Squadron 531 (VMF(N)-531) was commissioned on 16 November 1942 at Marine Corps Air Station Cherry Point, North Carolina. On 9 January 1943 the squadron became part of the Fleet Marine Force and on 1 April was absorbed by Marine Aircraft Group 53 (MAG-53). The squadron took delivery of its first non-trainer aircraft, the Lockheed PV-1 Ventura on 15 February. Due to the uniqueness of their night fight mission, VMF(N)-531 was placed under the direction of the Commandant of the Marine Corps until it was ready to deploy to combat.

Responding to Japanese night attacks on Guadalcanal, MAG-53 was reassigned to the 3rd Marine Aircraft Wing on 15 April 1943 and was quickly ordered to deploy to the South Pacific as soon as possible. VMF(N)-531 was the first combat squadron to leave MCAS Cherry Point. After layovers in Hawaii and Espiritu Santo, the squadron finally arrived at Renard Field on Banika in the Russell Islands on 11 September. Joining Marine Aircraft Group 21, 1st Marine Aircraft Wing, the Grey Ghosts flew their first combat patrol on 16 September making them the first naval aviation night-fighter squadron to operate in the South Pacific. The squadron's first kill was made by Captain Duane Jenkins, who happened upon a Betty bomber on the evening of 13 November 1943.

The first kill aided by GCI did not come until 6 December. During their tour in the Pacific, the squadron operated out of fields in the Russell Islands, Vella Lavella and Bougainville. They accounted for 12 enemy planes shot down by 5 different crews, all at night, with a loss of 6 of their own aircraft and 17 crew members, none of them a result of enemy fire. The squadron returned to MCAS Cherry Point on 1 September 1944 and was quickly deactivated only to be reactivated a short time later on 13 October at Marine Corps Auxiliary Airfield Kinston (MCAAF Kinston), North Carolina and reassigned to MAG-53, 9th Marine Aircraft Wing. A short time later the squadron moved to Marine Corps Air Station Eagle Mountain Lake near Fort Worth, Texas to operate as a training squadron for replacement pilots and ground control intercept operators being sent overseas.

Following the conclusion of World War II, the squadron was relocated back to MCAS Cherry Point and in March 1947 reassigned to the 2nd Marine Aircraft Wing (2nd MAW) and renamed VMF(AW)-531.

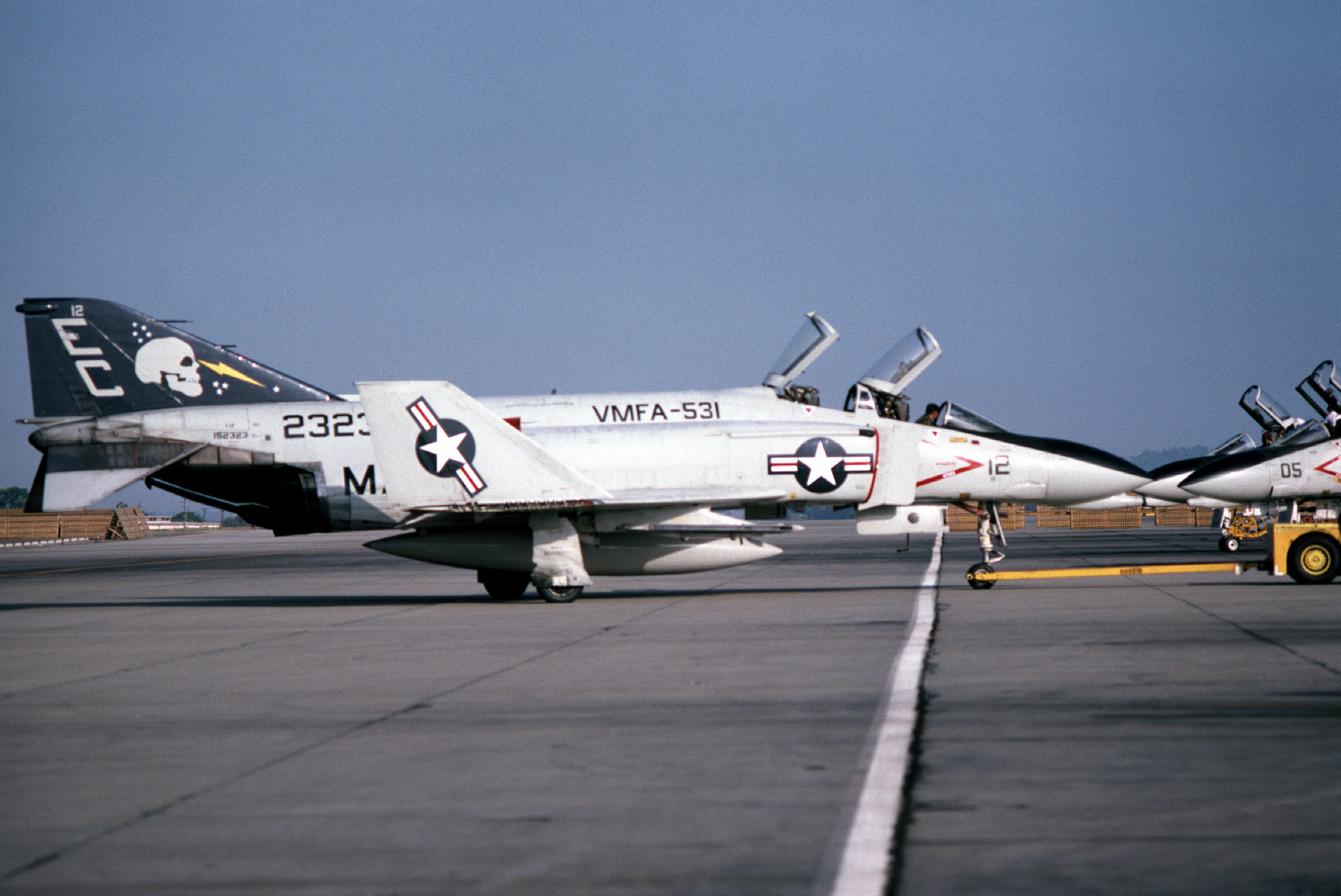
An F-4N of VMFA-531 in 1982.

=== 1950s and 1960s ===
After the outbreak of the Korean War, VMF(AW)-531 became a training unit for Douglas F3D Skyknight pilots. In 1959, the squadron's F4D Skyray began replacing the F3Ds. The squadron made 2 routine deployments to NAF Atsugi in 1959 and 1960. In July 1962, the squadron transitioned to the F-4 Phantom II. VMF(AW)-531 became the first Marine Corps squadron to join NORAD. During the Cuban Missile Crisis, VMF(AW)-531 deployed to NAS Key West to assist VF-41 in the air defense role. After the crisis, two VMF(AW)-531 F-4Bs had nearly shot down 2 Cuban MiG-17s near Cuba. In August 1963, the squadron was redesignated VMFA-531.

=== The Vietnam War ===
On 10 April 1965, 15 F-4Bs from the squadron arrived at Da Nang Air Base, South Vietnam becoming the first land-based Marine Corps jets during the Vietnam War. They immediately began flying bombing missions under radar guidance and standard close air support missions in support of Marines on the ground. General William Westmoreland specifically requested an F-4 Phantom unit because it was capable of performing both tactical missions within South Vietnam and strike missions against North Vietnam.

=== The 1970s ===
In 1972, VMFA-531 was deployed aboard the USS Forrestal (CVA-59) for a Mediterranean cruise as part of Attack Carrier Air Wing 17. In the spring of 1975, VMFA-531 was selected to become the second Marine Corps F-14 Tomcat squadron, resulting in the squadron being transferred to MCAS Beaufort, SC, until cancellation of Marine participation in the F-14 program resulted in the return of the "Grey Ghosts" to El Toro on 29 August 1975 and its transition to the F-4N Phantom II aircraft.

=== The 1980s to 1992 ===
In November 1979, the squadron was deployed in the Indian Ocean on board the USS Coral Sea as a part of CVW-14. This was the first time in history that an entire Carrier Battle Group's maritime air superiority was provided exclusively by Marine Corps fighter units, VMFA-531 and VMFA-323. VMFA-531, participated in Operation Eagle Claw, the attempted rescue of American hostages from Iran, with orders to shoot down any Iranian aircraft. The Phantoms were painted with a yellow stripe enclosed by two black stripes in order to distinguish the American F-4s from the Iranian F-4s. When the operation failed, VMFA-531 flew missions around the clock until all US support ships had exited the Persian Gulf and the Gulf of Oman. It was also during the build-up phase to the failed rescue mission that the "Grey Ghosts" fired the first AIM-7F Sparrow missile from an F-4N aircraft. On 24 November 1982, the squadron's last F-4N Phantom aircraft were retired after over 20 years of service.

On 29 May 1983, VMFA-531 received its first F/A-18 Hornet, becoming the 3rd fleet squadron to receive the new fighter. During this period, the squadron would participate in many training exercises with allied militaries. VMFA-531 participated in Exercise Cobra Gold-88, operating out of U-Tapao Air Base in Thailand, becoming the first Marine aviation deployment to Southeast Asia since the end of the involvement in Vietnam. During the Gulf War, VMFA-531 remained at El Toro while many of its planes and personnel fought with other Marine squadrons stationed in Saudi Arabia and surrounding countries.

LtCol Keith J. Stalder was the commanding officer from December 1990 to the time the squadron was decommissioned 21 March 1992.

== Gallery ==
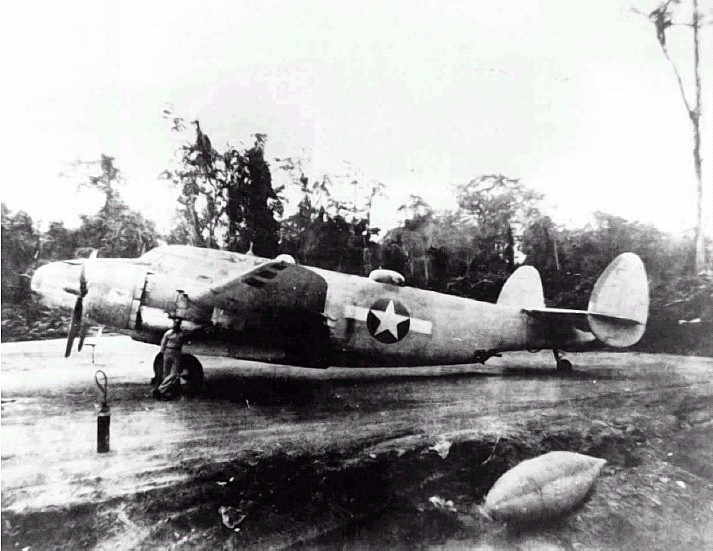
A PV-1 of VMF(N)-531 in the Solomons, 1943

VMF(N)-531 F7F-3N in 1950

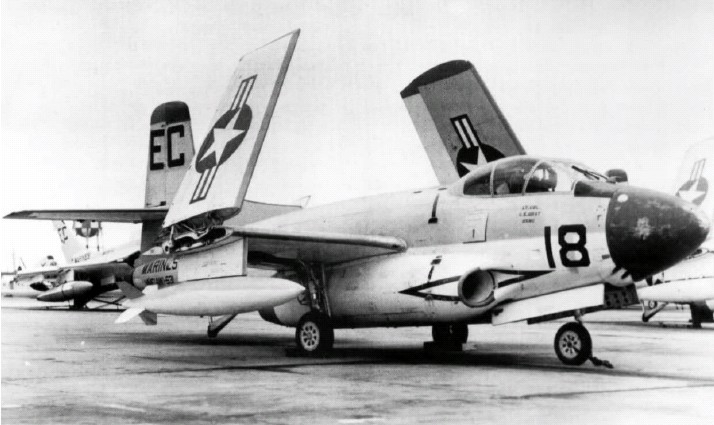
VMF(AW)-531 F3D-2 in 1957

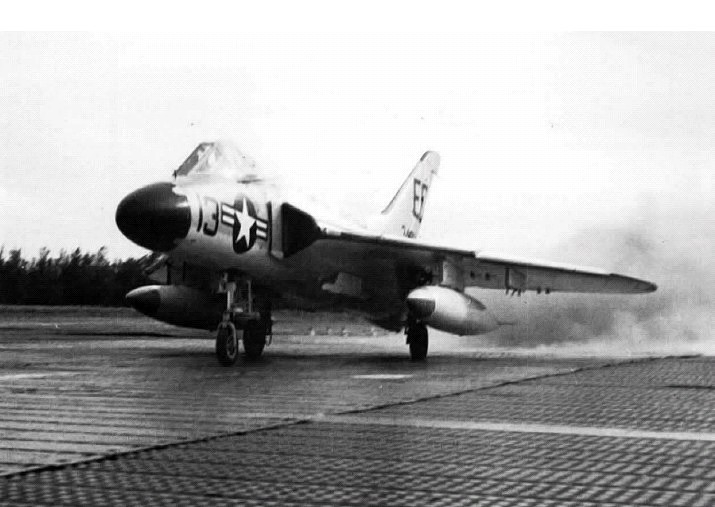
VMF(AW)-531 F4D-1 in 1960

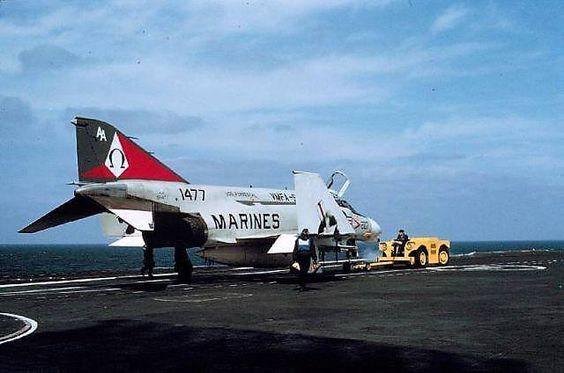
A VMFA-531 F-4B operating from HMS Ark Royal in 1973

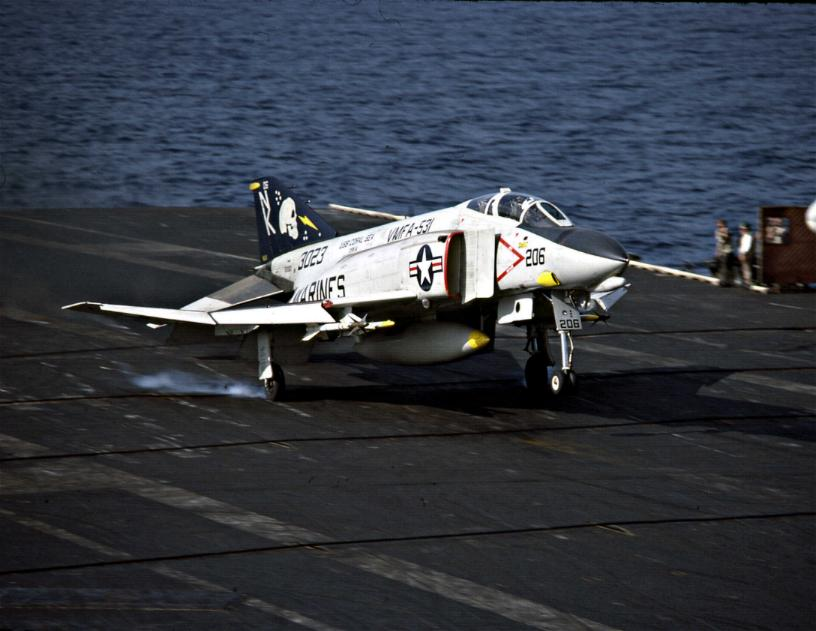
A VMFA-531 F-4N landing on the USS Coral Sea in 1980

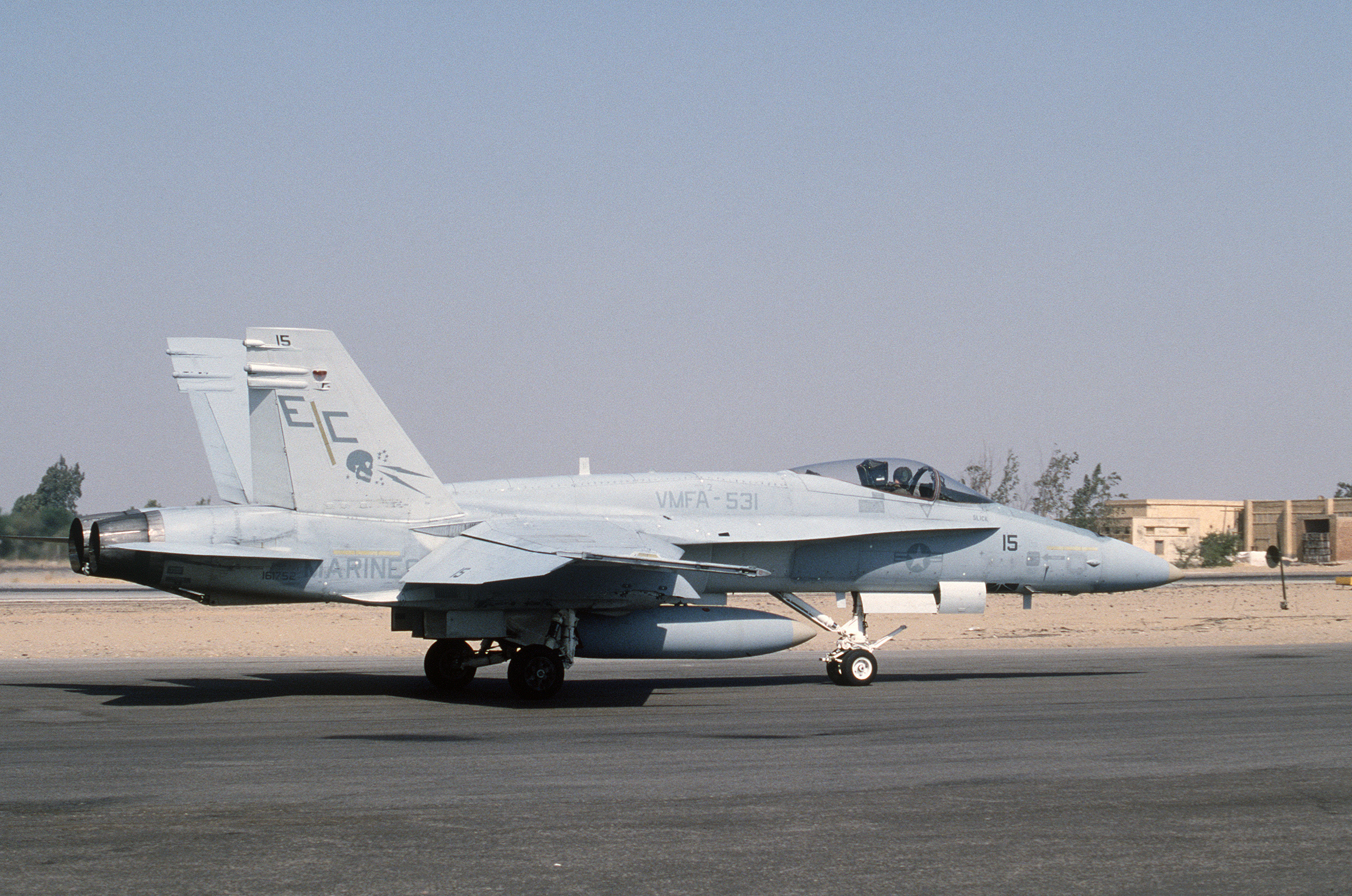
An F/A-18A of VMFA-531 in 1985

== See also ==
- VMF(N)-531 GCI Detachment
- United States Marine Corps Aviation
- List of United States Marine Corps aircraft squadrons
- List of decommissioned United States Marine Corps aircraft squadrons
