= Duane D. Thiessen =

United States Marine Corps general

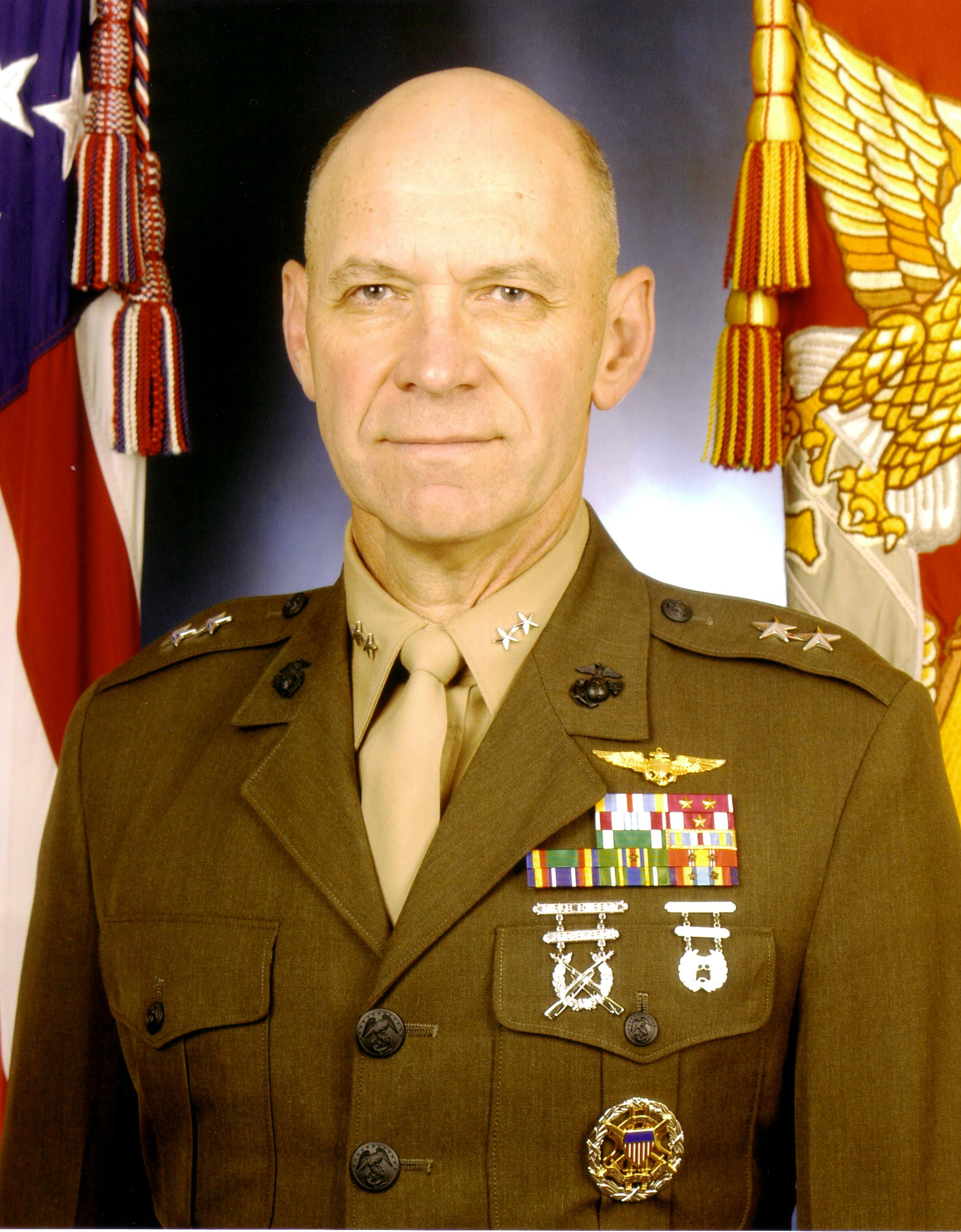
- Duane D. Thiessen as Commander, United States Marine Corps Forces Korea
- Born: March 11, 1951 (age 75); Goessel, Kansas
- Military career
- Allegiance: United States of America
- Branch: United States Marine Corps
- Service years: 1974–2012
- Rank: Lieutenant general
- Commands: VMAT-203; Marine Aircraft Group 13; Inspector General of the Marine Corps; 1st Marine Aircraft Wing; USMC Forces Korea
- Awards: Defense Superior Service Medal; Legion of Merit (2)

Duane D. Thiessen (born March 11, 1951) is a retired lieutenant general in the United States Marine Corps, and is the past commander of the United States Marine Corps Forces Pacific, serving from September 2, 2010, until his retirement on August 7, 2012. Lt. General Thiessen is a former president and CEO of the National Naval Aviation Museum Foundation located on Naval Air Station Pensacola.

https://navalaviationfoundation.org/wp-content/uploads/2025/03/2024-2025-namf-bod-trustees-new1.pdf

== Biography ==
Thiessen was commissioned as a second lieutenant in May 1974, after graduating from Pittsburg State University. Following completion of flight training, he reported to Marine Corps Air Station Cherry Point, North Carolina, for transition training to the AV-8A Harrier. Thiessen's initial assignment as a Harrier pilot was with VMA-542, where he performed in both Operational and Maintenance billets while completing two deployments to Okinawa and participating in a Mediterranean deployment aboard the USS Nassau. In July 1982, Captain Thiessen reported to Marine Aviation Weapons and Tactics Squadron 1 in Yuma, Arizona, where he served as an AV-8 tactics instructor.

In December 1985, Major Thiessen returned to Cherry Point and was assigned to VMA-231 as the Operations Officer, where he led a detachment of six AV-8Bs that deployed to the Mediterranean Sea as part of the 22nd Marine Expeditionary Unit. Upon returning to the United States in 1988, Major Thiessen attended the Naval Command and Staff College in Newport, Rhode Island. Following graduation he reported to Naval Air Systems Command, Washington, D.C., and served as an assistant to the AV-8B program manager.

In June 1991, Lieutenant Colonel Thiessen assumed command of VMAT-203 at Cherry Point. After relinquishing command, he returned to Washington, DC, to attend the National War College. He was subsequently assigned as the Marine Requirements Officer in the Joint Strike Fighter Program office. Colonel Thiessen then served until June 1999 as the Commanding Officer of Marine Aircraft Group 13 in Yuma.

Following command of MAG-13, Colonel Thiessen served in the Aviation Plans and Policy Branch of Headquarters Marine Corps until July 2000, when he was appointed to the position of Deputy Assistant Secretary of the Navy for Expeditionary Force Programs. Colonel Thiessen was promoted to brigadier general and assumed the duties as the deputy director of operations, National Military Command Center in October 2001. He then served until May 2004 as the Deputy Naval Inspector General for Marine Corps Matters/Inspector General of the Marine Corps. Thiessen was then assigned as the Commanding General of 1st Marine Aircraft Wing in Okinawa, Japan, from 3 June 2004 to 10 June 2005, followed by a two-year tour as Commander, Marine Forces Korea and assistant Chief of Staff, U/C/J-5, United Nations Command, Combined Forces Command, and the United States Forces Korea.

In June 2007, Major General Thiessen returned to the United States and assumed the duties of Assistant Deputy Commandant for Programs and Resources (Programs) at Headquarters United States Marine Corps. Thiessen was nominated for promotion to the rank of Lieutenant General on March 13, 2008, to become the Deputy Commandant for Programs and Resources.

Secretary of Defense Robert M. Gates announced March 15, 2010 that LtGen Duane D. Thiessen has been nominated for reappointment to the rank of lieutenant general with assignment as commander, U.S. Marine Corps Forces Pacific; commanding general, Fleet Marine Force Pacific; and commander, Marine Corps Bases Pacific.

Lieutenant General Thiessen is married to Lynn Rodd and they have two children.

== Awards ==

Naval Aviator Badge
| | Defense Superior Service Medal | Legion of Merit w/ 2 award stars | |
| Defense Meritorious Service Medal | Meritorious Service Medal w/ 1 award star | Navy and Marine Corps Commendation Medal | Joint Meritorious Unit Award |
| Navy Unit Commendation | Navy Meritorious Unit Commendation w/ 1 service star | National Defense Service Medal w/ 2 award stars | Global War on Terrorism Service Medal |
| Korea Defense Service Medal | Humanitarian Service Medal | Navy Sea Service Deployment Ribbon w/ 2 service stars | Navy & Marine Corps Overseas Service Ribbon |

== See also ==
Military offices
| Preceded by John F. Goodman | Commanding General of the 1st Marine Aircraft Wing; 2004–2005 | Succeeded by George J. Trautman III |
| Preceded by John F. Goodman | Commander of the United States Marine Corps Forces, Korea; 2005–2007 | Succeeded by ??? |
| Preceded by Emerson N. Gardner Jr. | Deputy Commandant for Programs and Resources of the United States Marine Corps; 2008–2010 | Succeeded by John Wissler |
| Preceded by Keith J. Stalder | Commander of the United States Marine Corps Forces, Pacific; Commanding General of Fleet Marine Force, Pacific; 2010–2012 | Succeeded by Terry G. Robling |
