= U-Tapao Royal Thai Navy Airfield =

Military airport in Rayong, Thailand

U-Tapao Royal Thai Navy Base
- Part of Royal Thai Navy (RTN)

Site information
- Type: Naval Air Base
- Owner: Royal Thai Navy
- Operator: Royal Thai Navy
- Controlled by: Royal Thai Navy
- Condition: Military Naval Air Base

Location
- Coordinates: 12°40′47″N 101°00′18″E

Site history
- Battles/wars: Vietnam War

Airfield information
- IATA: UTP; ICAO: VTBU

Summary
- Elevation AMSL: 42 ft (13 m)
- Coordinates: 12°40′47″N 101°00′18″E

Map
- Location in Thailand

Runways
Direction	Length		Surface
Direction	ft	m	Surface
18/36	11,500	3,505	Asphalt
- Source: DAFIF

U-Tapao Royal Thai Navy Airfield is a military airfield of the Royal Thai Navy (RTN) approximately 140 kilometres (87 mi) southeast of Bangkok in the Ban Chang District of Rayong Province near Sattahip on the Gulf of Thailand. It serves as the home of the RTN First Air Wing.

== Etymology ==
U-Tapao (Thai: อู่ตะเภา) is a compound of อู่ cradle or drydock and ตะเภา trade winds, and derives from the site having once been a shipyard for construction of ruea-tapao (เรือตะเภา), a type of argosy resembling a Qing Dynasty junk.

== History ==
In 1965 the RTN was permitted by the Council of Ministers to build a 1,200-meter (3,940 ft) long airfield near U-Tapao village, Ban Chang District, in Rayong Province. The United States, seeking a Southeast Asian base for its large jet aircraft, reached an agreement with the Thai government to build and operate the base in conjunction with the RTN. The US began construction of the runway and all facilities on 15 October 1965 and completed it on 2 June 1966. The base was administratively handed over to the RTN on 10 August 1966.

The 11,000-foot (3,400 m) runway became operational on 6 July 1966 and U-Tapao received its first complement of United States Air Force (USAF) Strategic Air Command (SAC) KC-135 tankers in August 1966. The USAF had been flying B-52 Stratofortress bombers Operation Arc Light bombing missions over South Vietnam from Kadena Air Base on Okinawa, but Okinawa was judged to be too far from South Vietnam to meet mission requirements. An optimal solution was to base the B-52s in South Vietnam or Thailand, however base security in South Vietnam was problematic. U-Tapao had an existing runway suitable for the bombers and the cost for upgrades to the base was minimal. In January 1967, negotiations between the US and Thai government started to base them at U-Tapao. The agreement, reached on 2 March 1967, allowed 15 B-52s and their support personnel to be based at U-Tapao, with the provision that missions flown from Thailand would not over fly Laos or Cambodia on their way to targets in Vietnam. The first B-52's arrived on 10 April 1967. The next day, B-52 sorties were flown from U-Tapao. By 1972 there were 54 B-52 aircraft stationed in Thailand.

== U.S. use of U-Tapao during the Vietnam War ==

Prior to 1965, the base at U-Tapao was a small RTN airfield. At Don Muang Air Base near Bangkok, the USAF had stationed KC-135 Stratotankers to refuel combat aircraft over the skies of Indochina. Although Thailand was an active participant in the Vietnam War, with a token ground force deployed to the South Vietnam as well as involved in the largely secret civil war in Laos, the presence and the visibility of USAF aircraft near its capital city was causing a degree of political embarrassment for Thailand's military government.

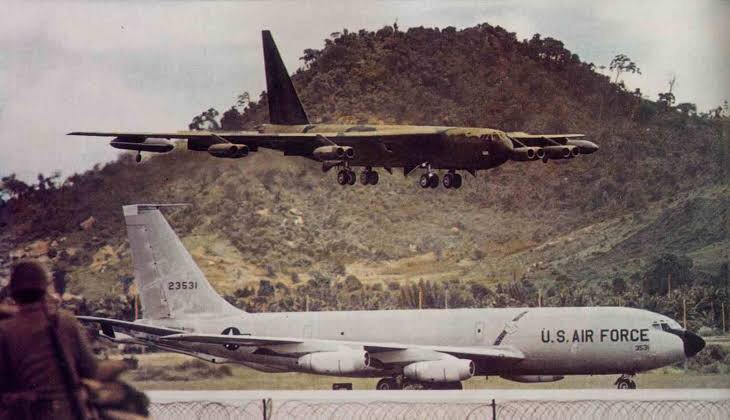
KC-135 and B-52 at U-Tapao, January 1970

The B-52 Stratofortess was first used in the Vietnam War in June 1965; aircraft from the 7th and 320th Bomb Wings were sent to bomb suspected Viet Cong enclaves in South Vietnam, the operation being supported by KC-135As stationed at Kadena Air Base on Okinawa.

In September 1966, two radio-relay KC-135A Combat Lightning aircraft and their personnel were ordered to deploy to U-Tapao to support air operations over North Vietnam.

The expansion of U-Tapao RTN airfield began in October 1965; the runway was built in eight months, and the base was completed slightly more than two years later. The 11,500-foot (3,505 m) runway was opened on 6 July 1966.

With the completion of U-Tapao, most U.S. forces were transferred from Don Muang, and U-Tapao RTNAF became a front-line facility of the USAF in Thailand from 1966 to 1975.

The USAF forces at U-Tapao were under the command of the U.S. Pacific Air Forces (PACAF), with the Strategic Air Command (SAC) units being a tenant unit. The APO for U-Tapao was APO San Francisco, 96330

=== 4258th Strategic Wing ===
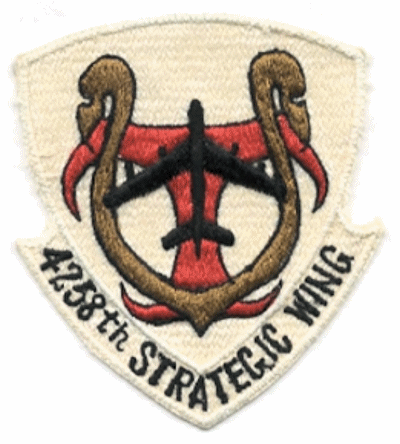

The 4258th Strategic Wing (SAC) was activated in June 1966 at U-Tapao under the 3rd Air Division, headquartered at Andersen Air Force Base on Guam. The wing was charged with the responsibility of supporting refueling requirements of USAF fighter aircraft in Southeast Asia, plus conducting bombing missions on a daily basis.

Steadily progressing and adding to the mission, U-Tapao welcomed its first complement of KC-135 tankers in August 1966. By September, the base was supporting 15 tankers. From 1966 to 1970, 4258th wing tankers flew over 50,000 sorties from U-Tapao.

The Seventh Air Force (PACAF) wanted additional B-52s missions flown in the war zone. B-52 missions from Andersen and Kadena, however, required long mission times and aerial refuelling en route. Having the aircraft based in South Vietnam made them vulnerable to attack. It was decided that, as the base at U-Tapao was being established as a KC-135 tanker base, to move them all out of Don Muang and to also base B-52s at U-Tapao where they could fly without refuelling over both North and South Vietnam.

In March 1967, the Thai Government approved the stationing of B-52s at U-Tapao; on 10 April 1967, three B-52 bombers landed at U-Tapao following a bombing mission over Vietnam. The next day, B-52 operations were initiated at U-Tapao and by 15 July, B-52s were typically operating from U-Tapao. Under Operation Arc Light, wing bombers flew over 35,000 strikes over South Vietnam from 1967 to 1970.

In early-October 1968, a KC-135A tanker (55-3138) lost power in the outside right engine (#4) on takeoff at U-Tapao and crashed, killing all four crew members.

==== Known SAC units at U-Tapao ====
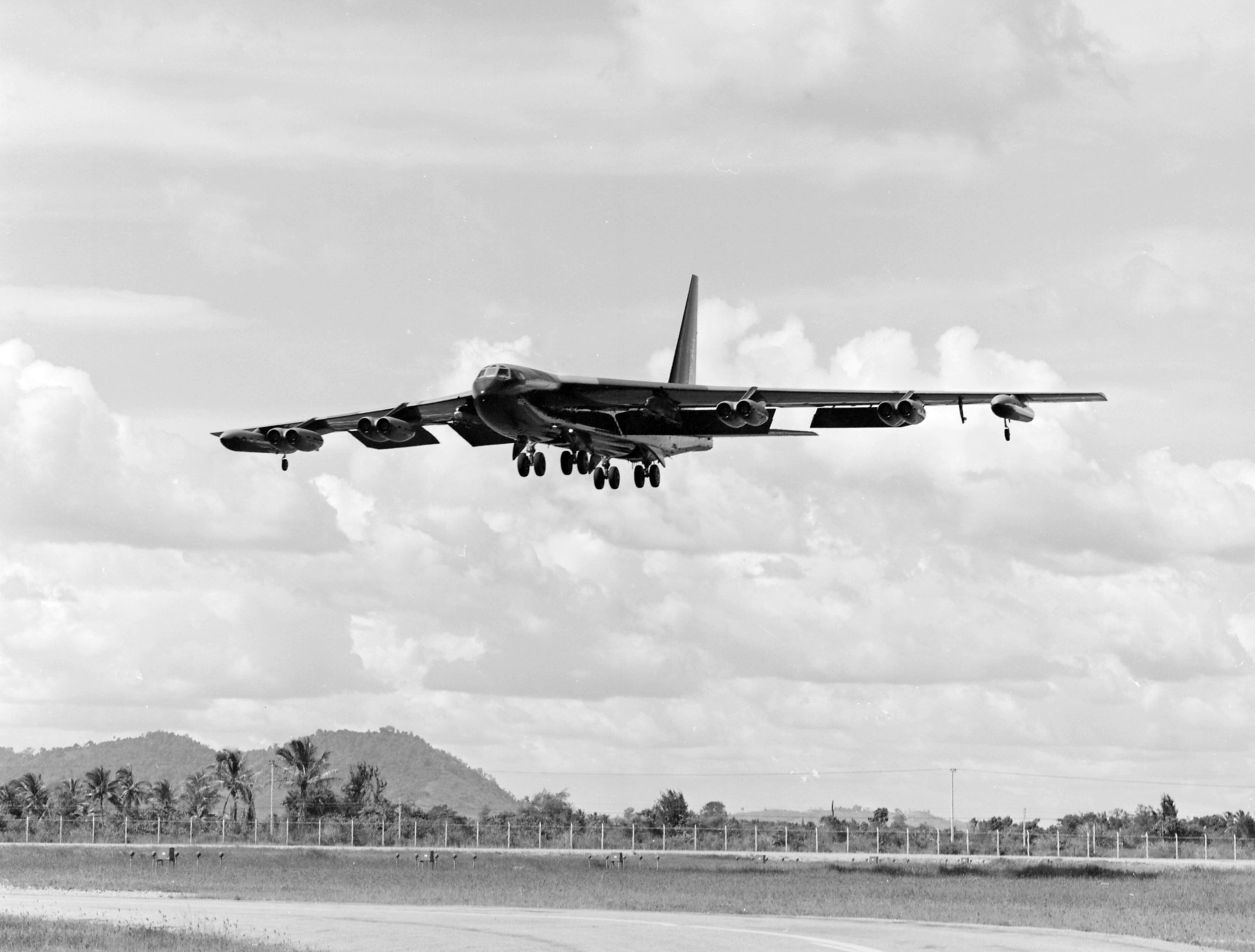
B-52D approaching U-Tapao in October 1972

U-Tapao was initially more of a forward field than it was a main operating base, with responsibility for scheduling missions still remaining at Andersen AFB. Small numbers of aircraft were drawn from each SAC B-52D unit to support the effort in Thailand. Known squadrons which deployed B-52 and KC-135 aircraft and crews to U-Tapao were:

- 2nd Bombardment Squadron
- 6th Bombardment Squadron (Heavy)
- 9th Bombardment Squadron
- 77th Bombardment Squadron
- 69th Bombardment Squadron
- 322nd Bombardment Squadron
- 325th Bombardment Squadron
- 328th Bombardment Squadron
- 329th Bombardment Squadron
- 337th Bombardment Squadron
- 346th Bombardment Squadron
- 348th Bombardment Squadron
- 367th Bombardment Squadron
- 393rd Bombardment Squadron
- 486th Bombardment Squadron
- 528th Bombardment Squadron
- 716th Bombardment Squadron
- 736th Bombardment Squadron
- 764th Bombardment Squadron
- 305th Air Refueling Squadron
- 911th Air Refueling Squadron
- 912th Air Refueling Squadron
- 920th Air Refueling Squadron

These units deployed usually on 90 days tours.

U-Tapao based B-52s flew in support of US Marines in the Battle of Khe Sanh in early-1968. Under Operation Niagara waves of six B-52s, attacking every three hours, dropped bombs as close as 900 feet (270 m) from the perimeter of the outpost. A total of 2,548 B-52 sorties were flown in support of the defense of Khe Sanh, dropping a total of 54,129 tonnes (59,542 tons) of bombs. U-Tapao based B-52s also bombed the southernmost part of North Vietnam near the Vietnamese Demilitarized Zone.

==== Raids in Cambodia ====
Beginning in March 1969, B-52s were raiding not only South Vietnam and Laos, but Cambodia as well. The Nixon Administration had approved this expansion of the war not long after entering office in the spring of 1969. Cambodian bombing raids were initially kept secret, and both SAC and Defense Department records were falsified to report that the targets were in South Vietnam.

The Cambodian raids were carried out at night under the direction of ground units using the MSQ-77 radar, which guided the bombers to their release points and indicated the precise moment of bomb release. This made deception easier, as even crew members aboard the bombers did not have to know what country they were bombing. However, the specific flight coordinates (longitude and latitude) of the points of bomb release were noted in the navigator's logs at the end of each mission, and a simple check of the map could tell the crews which country they were bombing.

Following the opening of the Cambodian Campaign in late April 1970 the secret Menu bombings came to an end on 26 May and the USAF began overt operations against North Vietnamese People's Army of Vietnam (PAVN) and Viet Cong forces in eastern Cambodia.

=== 307th Strategic Wing ===
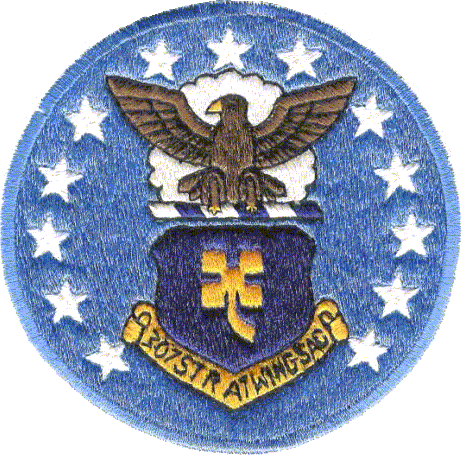

On 21 January 1970, the 4258th SW was redesignated as the 307th Strategic Wing. The 307th was the only regular Air Force SAC Wing stationed in Southeast Asia. The 307th was under the command and control of Eighth Air Force, based at Andersen AFB, Guam.

Four provisional squadrons were organized under the 307th:

- Bombardment Squadron (Provisional), 364, 1973–1975
- Bombardment Squadron (Provisional), 365, 1973–1974. Disbanded 7/17/74
- Bombardment Squadron (Provisional),486, 1970–1971
- Air Refueling Squadron (Provisional), 901, 1974–1975

In addition, two four-digit bomb squadrons (4180th, 4181st) were assigned, but were not operational.

Detachment 12 of the 38th Aerospace Rescue and Recovery Squadron operating 2 HH-43s provided search and rescue at the base.

In May 1970 USAF tactical airlift C-130s that had been based at Don Muang Air Base moved their operations to U-Tapao and the 6th Aerial Port Squadron followed in July. The C-130s were withdrawn in late-1971 but returned in April 1972.

==== Sapper attack ====
On 10 January 1972, three communist sappers attempted to destroy B-52s in a sapper attack using grenades and satchel charges. One attacker was apparently killed in the attack, while the other two managed to cause minor damage to three B-52s before fleeing the base.

==== Operation Linebacker ====
In late March 1972, the North Vietnamese launched a full-scale offensive across the Vietnamese Demilitarized Zone, supported by tanks and heavy artillery. By this time, the US was no longer in the forefront of the ground war, with South Vietnamese units taking the lead. However, the US was still providing air power, and President Nixon ordered a large increase on US airpower in response to the invasion. Although there had been no campaign of strikes into North Vietnam since the end of Rolling Thunder, the Nixon Administration ordered a new air offensive, initially code named Freedom Train, later becoming Operation Linebacker, with relatively few restrictions on targets that could be hit.

At this time 51 B-52s were based at U-Tapao. The B-52s conducted a limited number of strikes against North Vietnam as part of the spring 1972 invasion, though most of their sorties were on Arc Light missions elsewhere. The North Vietnamese offensive was crushed, but the strikes on North Vietnam continued, only winding down in October, ahead of the 1972 United States presidential election, which resulted in Richard Nixon being re-elected and the attacks quickly ramped up again in November.

In late 1972, B-52s were confronted with surface-to-air missile (SAM) defenses. On 22 November 1972, a B-52D was damaged by an SA-2 SAM in a raid on Vinh, an important rail center in the southern part of North Vietnam. The bomber's pilot managed to get the burning aircraft back to Thailand before the crew bailed out, leaving the aircraft to crash. All the crew were recovered safely.

==== Operation Linebacker II ====
In late-1972 the Nixon Administration ordered an all-out air offensive against North Vietnam. The bombing raids, codenamed Operation Linebacker II, began on 18 December 1972 involving heavy attacks by almost every strike aircraft the US had in theater, with the B-52 playing a prominent role. The initial plan scheduled attacks for three days. Along with heavy strikes by USAF and Navy tactical aircraft, 129 B-52s in three waves (approximately four hours apart) from the 307th Strategic Wing at U-Tapao RTNAF and B-52Ds and B−52Gs of the 43d Strategic Wing and the 72 Strategic Wing (Provisional) both at Andersen AFB. The U-Tapao-based B-52Ds were able to carry more bombs and perform more sorties than the other units which operated less capable versions and had to fly much further to reach targets in North Vietnam.

In 11 days of concentrated bombing, B-52s had completed 729 sorties and dropped 13,640 tonnes (15,000 tons) of bombs. The North Vietnamese claimed that almost 1,400 civilians were killed. The campaign was expensive, 16 B-52s were lost and nine others suffered heavy damaged, with 33 aircrew killed or missing in action. On the night of 26 December a B-52 was hit by a SAM wounding its tail gunner and knocking out four engines, the aircraft limped back to U-Tapao where it crash-landed killing four crewmen with the tail gunner and co-pilot surviving the crash.

The Paris Peace Accords were signed on 27 January 1973, however Arc Light strikes on Laos continued into April and on Cambodia into August. The 307th SW ended all combat operations on 14 August 1973.

On 23 March 1973 the USAF airlift control center at Tan Son Nhut Air Base, Saigon moved to U-Tapao becoming the Pacific Transportation Management Agency, Thailand, responsible for all C-130 operations in Southeast Asia. U-Tapao based C-130s of the 374th Wing flew missions into Cambodia, South Vietnam, and a weekly flight to Hanoi in support of the International Commission of Control and Supervision until April 1975. The C-130s flew supply missions into Cambodia until May 1974 when these operations were taken over by BirdAir which operated under contract to the US Government. In addition Khmer Air Force C-123s also began flying supply missions from U-Tapao into bases in Cambodia.

=== 1975 South Vietnamese collapse ===
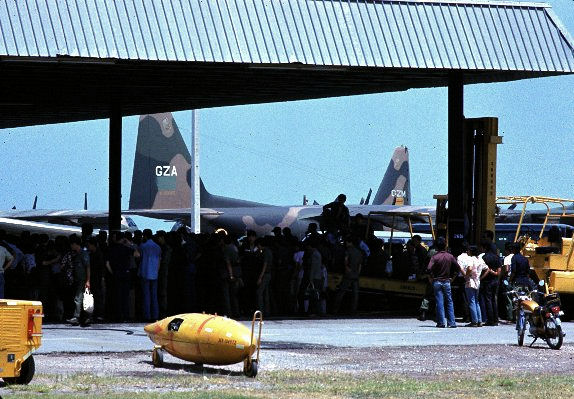
Two RVNAF C-130As, most likely belonging to the 433rd Transport Squadron at U-Tapao in April 1975

On the afternoon of 12 April 1975, following the completion of Operation Eagle Pull, the evacuation of US nationals and allied Cambodians from Phnom Penh, an HMH-462 CH-53 carried Ambassador John Gunther Dean from USS Okinawa to U-Tapao. On 13 April, the Eagle Pull evacuees were flown to U-Tapao on HMH-462 helicopters.

In the two years following the Paris Peace Accords, the PAVN underwent a massive rebuilding to recoup the losses suffered during their failed 1972 Easter Offensive. On 12 December 1974 the PAVN attacked Phuoc Long. The lack of any US response convinced the North Vietnamese leadership that the time was ripe to seize the South and they quickly launched their 1975 Spring Offensive overrunning many of the major cities and defensive positions in South Vietnam during March and April.

By early-April the South Vietnamese made their last stand at Xuân Lộc on their final defensive line before Saigon. Xuân Lộc fell on 20 April and South Vietnamese President Nguyễn Văn Thiệu resigned the following day, fleeing the country four days later.

An estimated 8,000 U.S. and third-country nationals needed to be evacuated from Saigon and the shrinking government-controlled region of South Vietnam, along with thousands of "at-risk" Vietnamese who had worked for the United States during the war. Evacuation by civil and military fixed-wing aircraft from Tan Son Nhat had been taking place since early-March and continued until 28 April when PAVN artillery fire rendered the runways unusable. At this time a helicopter evacuation, code-named Operation Frequent Wind was implemented. U-Tapao and other USAF facilities in Thailand supported the evacuation.

Republic of Vietnam Air Force (RVNAF) C-47s, C-119s and C-130s filled to capacity with men, women and children, began flying into U-Tapao on 28 April as command and control collapsed, with a total of 123 aircraft arriving at U-Tapao. After their arrival, the Vietnamese were sequestered in tents near the runway. The adjacent parking ramps and grassy areas were being filled to capacity with South Vietnamese helicopters and aircraft.

VC-47A 084 of Air America crashed on landing on a flight from Tan Son Nhut.

On 30 April the South Vietnamese government surrendered. The handful of RVNAF planes that had been performing last-ditch air strikes completed their missions and flew to U-Tapao.

The former RVNAF C-130s that had arrived in Thailand were flown out to Singapore, while 27 RVNAF A-37s, 25 F-5s, and 50 UH-1s at U-Tapao were loaded by helicopter and barge onto USS Midway for transport to the US.

=== Mayagüez incident ===
On 12 May 1975, less than two weeks after the fall of Saigon, a unit of the Cambodian Khmer Rouge Navy seized the American-flagged container ship SS Mayaguez, taking the crew hostage. A U-Tapao based US Navy P-3 Orion was one of the first aircraft sent to locate the Mayaguez. On 13 May, Seventh Air Force commander Lieutenant General John J. Burns and his staff developed a contingency plan for volunteers of the Nakhon Phanom Royal Thai Air Force Base 56th Security Police (SP) Squadron to be dropped onto the containers on the decks of the Mayaguez. The next morning, 75 SPs from the 56th boarded helicopters of 21st Special Operations Squadron to proceed to U-Tapao for staging. A CH-53 #68-10933 crashed, killing 18 SPs and the five-man flight crew. The hasty attempt to effect recovery of the vessel and her crew using only USAF resources was abandoned. U-Tapao then served as a staging point for U.S. Marines to deploy aboard the remaining CH-53s of the 21st SOS and HH-53s of the 40th Aerospace Rescue and Recovery Squadron and assault Koh Tang Island some 195 nautical miles from U-Tapao, where the Mayaguez crew was believed to be held.

At dawn on 15 May the assault on Koh Tang began. The Khmer Rouge put up a fierce defense, shooting down three CH-53 helicopters and damaging several others which limped back to U-Tapao. The Khmer Rouge pinned the Marines in their landing zones, where they relied on air and naval gunfire for their survival and were eventually evacuated as darkness fell. Meanwhile, the abandoned Mayaguez was recovered by a boarding party from the USS Harold E. Holt. The crew which had been taken to the Cambodian mainland two days earlier were released unharmed by the Khmer Rouge. Total US losses were 15 killed in action and three missing in action.

=== USAF withdrawal ===
On 14 October 1973 following the 1973 Thai popular uprising former Supreme Court Judge Sanya Dharmasakti, then chancellor and dean of the faculty of law at Thammasat University, was appointed prime minister by royal decree, replacing the succession of staunchly pro-American and anti-Communist military dictatorships that had ruled Thailand previously.

With the fall of both Cambodia and South Vietnam in the spring of 1975, the political climate between Washington and the government of PM Sanya soured. Immediately after the news broke of the use of Thai bases to support the Mayaguez rescue, the Thai government lodged a formal protest with the US and riots broke out outside the US Embassy in Bangkok. The Thai government wanted the US out of Thailand by the end of the year. The USAF implemented Palace Lightning, the plan to withdraw its aircraft and personnel from Thailand. The SAC units left in December 1975. The 3rd Aerospace Rescue and Recovery Group left on 31 January 1976, however the base remained under US control until it was formally returned to the Thai government on 13 June 1976.

=== USAF major units at U-Tapao ===
- 4258th Strategic Wing (1966–1970)
- 307th Strategic Wing (1970–1975)
- Young Tiger Tanker Force (1966–1975)
- Strategic Wing (Provisional), 310th (1972)
- Consolidated Aircraft Maintenance Wing (Provisional), 340th (1972)
- 99th Strategic Reconnaissance Squadron (1972–1976)
- Air Division (Provisional), 310th (1972)
- 11th USAF Hospital
- 635th Combat Support Group
- 1985th Communications Squadron
- 554th CES (Red Horse – Combat Engineers)

== Current military use ==
For several years, beginning in 1981, U-Tapao has hosted parts of Cobra Gold, jointly involving US, Singaporean, and Thai armed forces, and designed to build ties between the nations and promote interoperability between their military components.

Thailand is an important element in The Pentagon's strategy of "forward positioning". Despite Thailand's neutrality on the 2003 invasion of Iraq, the Thai government allowed U-Tapao to be used by American warplanes flying into combat in Iraq, as it had earlier done during the war in Afghanistan. In addition, U-Tapao may be where Al Qaeda operative Abu Zubaydah and other renditioned detainees were interrogated, according to some retired American intelligence officials.

A multinational force headquarters was established at U-Tapao to coordinate humanitarian aid for the Sumatran tsunami of 26 December 2004.

In the aftermath of Cyclone Nargis, from 12 to 20 May 2008, USAID and the U.S. Department of Defense (DOD) coordinated the delivery of nearly US$1.2 million of relief commodities to Yangon on 36 DOD C-130 flights, with supplies sufficient to provide assistance to more than 113,000 beneficiaries. The DOD efforts were under the direction of Joint Task Force Caring Response. As of 26 June 2008, United States assistance directed by the USAID DART (Disaster Assistance Response Team) stationed in Thailand, had totaled US$41,169,769. Units involved were the 36th Airlift Squadron (36 AS) of the 374th Airlift Wing (374 AW) from Yokota Air Base, Japan, flying C-130H Hercules; and Marine Aerial Refueler Transport Squadron 152 (VMGR-152) from Marine Corps Air Station Futenma, Okinawa, Japan, flying the Lockheed Martin KC-130R and the KC-130J.

In 2012, a proposal for the United States National Aeronautics and Space Administration (NASA) to use U-Tapao to support weather research was rejected by the Thai government.

In 2015, a Politico article reported that the United States Government rented space at U-Tapao from a private contractor for use as a "major logistics hub for the Iraq and Afghanistan wars." Because the lease was technically with a private contractor, this allowed "U.S. and Thai officials to insist there's no U.S. 'base' and no inter-governmental basing agreement." Additionally in 2015, the Bangkok Post reported that the US would be allowed to station 16 planes at U-Tapao as part of a quake relief operation in Nepal.

The Naval Aviation Museum is located in the northwest corner of the base.

== Units ==
U-Tapao is the main flying base for the RTN. Squadrons based there include:

- No 101 Squadron flying Dornier 228-212 (seven aircraft)
- No 102 Squadron flying Lockheed P-3T/UP-3T (three aircraft) and Fokker F-27-200ME aircraft (a total of three, at least one of which is in store)
- No 103 Squadron flying Cessna 337 H-SP (10 aircraft, some may be stored)
- No 201 Squadron flying Canadair CL-215 (one aircraft), GAF Nomad N-24A (three aircraft, a fourth aircraft is in store) and Fokker F-27-400M (two aircraft)
- No 202 Squadron flying Bell 212 helicopters (approximately six)
- No 203 Squadron flying Bell 214SP helicopters (recently grounded after a fatal crash killing nine crew members on 23 March 2007), Sikorsky S-76B (six helicopters) and Super Lynx Mk.110 (two helicopters)
- No 302 Squadron flying Sikorsky S-70B Seahawk anti-submarine helicopters (six in service)

Two squadrons are dormant

- No 104 Squadron which flew 14 A-7E and 4 TA-7C Corsair strike aircraft
- No 301 Squadron which flew AV-8S and TAV-8S (two aircraft)

== See also ==
- United States Air Force in Thailand
- United States Pacific Air Forces
- Strategic Air Command
- Eighth Air Force

== Bibliography ==
- Endicott, Judy G. (1999) Active Air Force wings as of 1 October 1995; USAF active flying, space, and missile squadrons as of 1 October 1995. Maxwell AFB, Alabama: Office of Air Force History. CD-ROM.
- Glasser, Jeffrey D. (1998). The Secret Vietnam War: The United States Air Force in Thailand, 1961–1975. McFarland & Company. ISBN 0-7864-0084-6.
- Martin, Patrick (1994). Tail Code: The Complete History of USAF Tactical Aircraft Tail Code Markings. Schiffer Military Aviation History. ISBN 0-88740-513-4.
- USAAS-USAAC-USAAF-USAF Aircraft Serial Numbers—1908 to present
- The Royal Thai Air Force (English Pages)
- Royal Thai Air Force – Overview
