= Joint Task Force Caring Response =

United States multi-service humanitarian assistance and disaster relief effort

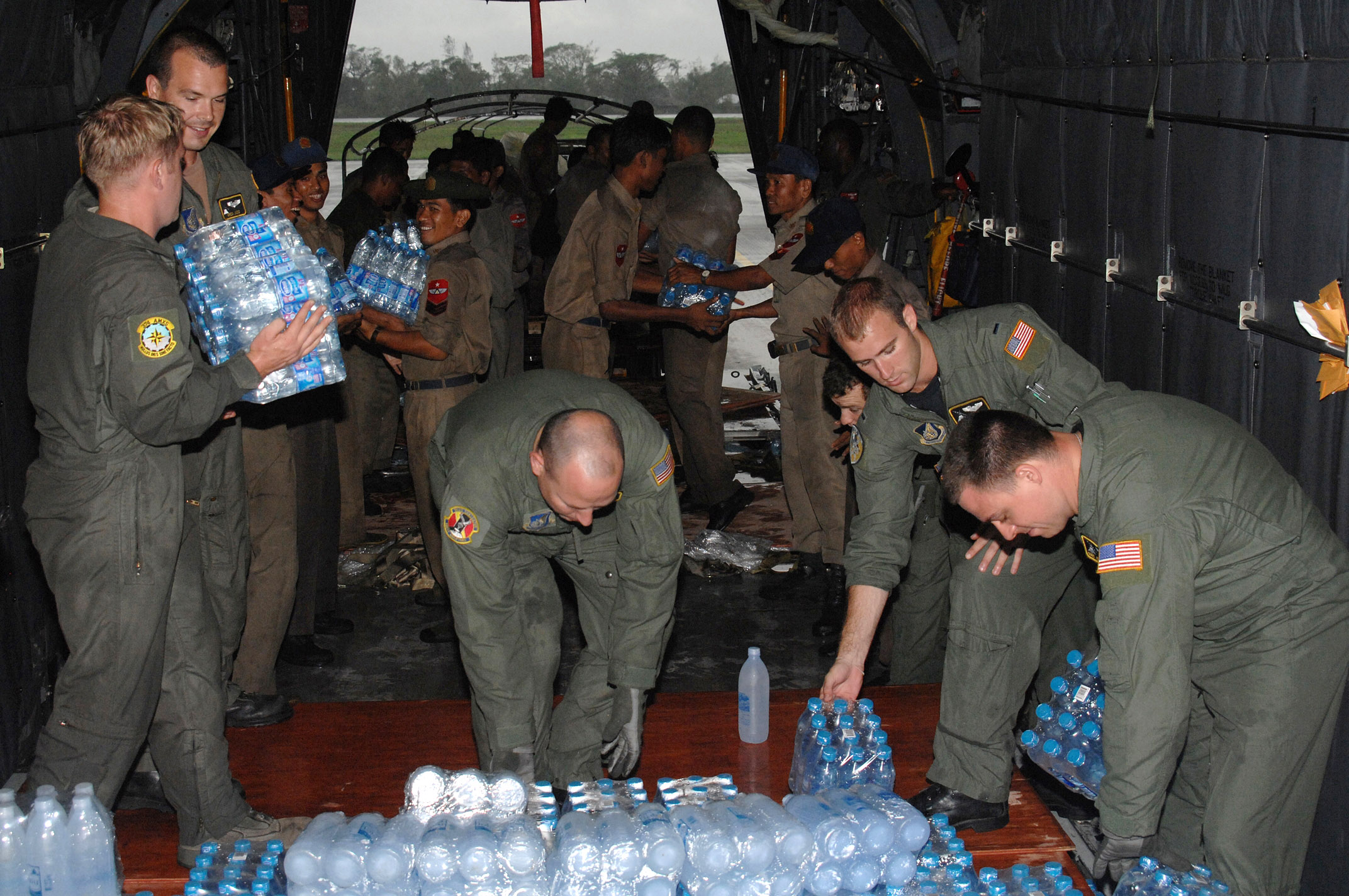
U.S. Air Force personnel deliver relief supplies to Burma in May 2008.

Joint Task Force Caring Response was an American multi-service humanitarian assistance and disaster relief effort for Burmese citizens devastated by Cyclone Nargis in 2008.

== History ==
JTF Caring Response was led by Lieutenant General John F. Goodman of the U.S. Marine Corps.

During a delivery by MAG-36 supported by 36th Airlift Squadron on 19 May 2008 to Yangon International Airport in Burma approximately 15,000 pounds of water, water containers, rations, and mosquito netting were unloaded from a C-130 Hercules aircraft in direct support of VMGR-152.

Expeditionary Strike Group 7/TF 76/31st Marine Expeditionary Unit was also standing by off the Myanmar coast in order to be ready to deliver aid should it be allowed to do so.
