= Keith J. Stalder =

United States Marine Corps general

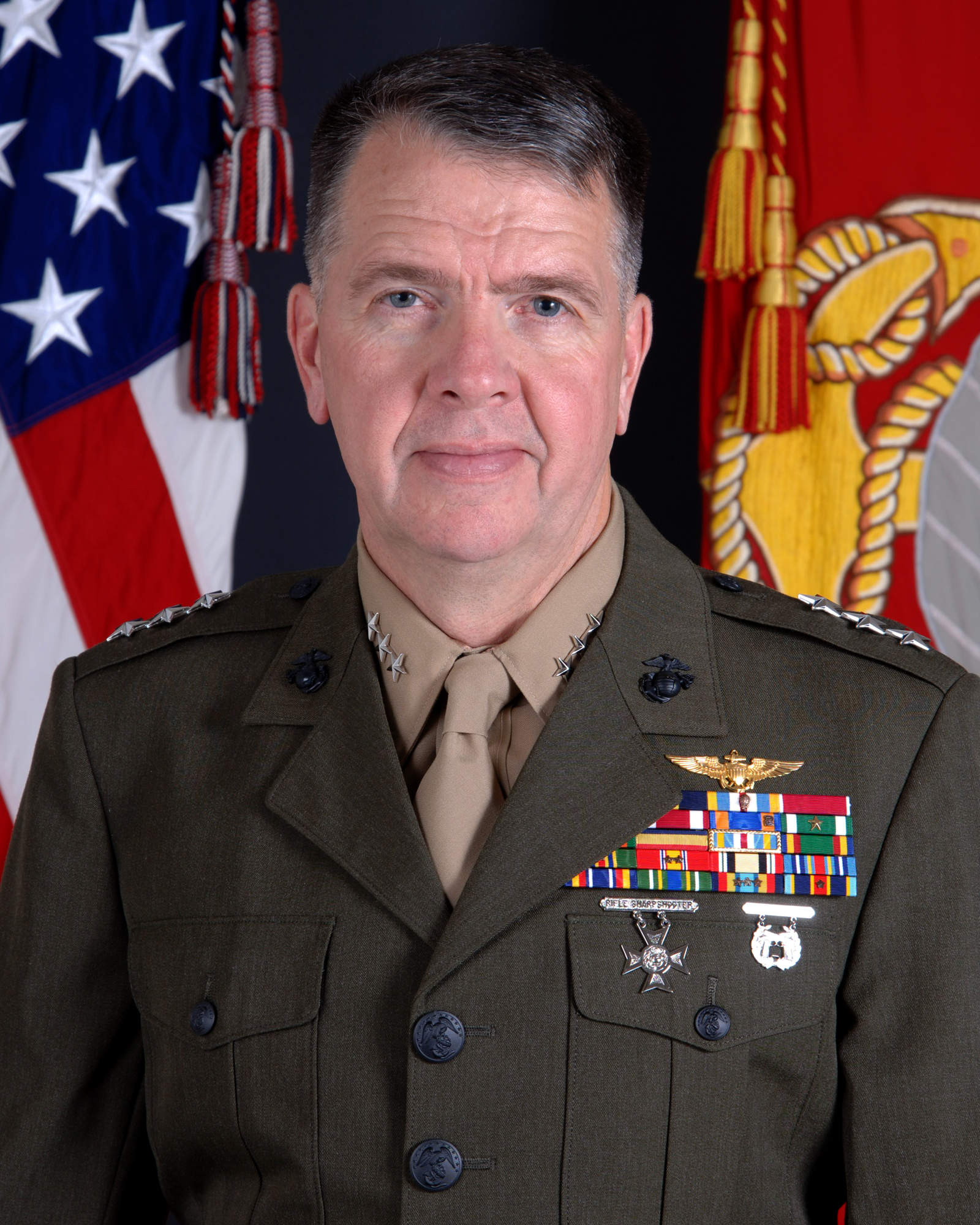
- LtGen Keith J. Stalder, USMC
- Born: Venezuela
- Military career
- Allegiance: United States of America
- Branch: United States Marine Corps
- Service years: 1973–2010
- Rank: Lieutenant General
- Commands: VMFA-531; 3rd Marine Aircraft Wing; 1st Marine Expeditionary Brigade; Training and Education Command; II Marine Expeditionary Force; Marine Forces Pacific; Marine Aviation Weapons and Tactics Squadron One
- Conflicts: Cold War; War on terror
- Awards: Navy Distinguished Service Medal; Defense Superior Service Medal (2); Legion of Merit; Meritorious Service Medal; Air Medal; Navy and Marine Corps Commendation Medal (2)

Lieutenant General Keith J. Stalder is a retired United States Marine Corps general, who last commanded the United States Marine Corps Forces Pacific from August 22, 2008, to September 2, 2010.

== Biography ==
Keith Stalder was born in Venezuela and grew up in Alaska. A 1971 graduate of the University of Alaska and 1984 graduate of Embry-Riddle Aeronautical University, he holds an associates degree in Electronics Technology a master's degree in Aeronautics. He is also a graduate of Marine Corps Command and Staff College, the Armed Forces Staff College, and the NATO Defense College in Rome, Italy.

He has flown the F-4 Phantom II and the F/A-18 Hornet with VMFA-333, VMFA-235, VMFA-115, the Navy's VFA-125, VMFA-531 and Marine Aviation Weapons and Tactics Squadron One (MAWTS-1). He also served at Headquarters, European Command, Stuttgart, Germany as the Operations Division Chief for the military-to-military contact program for Central and Eastern Europe and the former Soviet Union. He led the Marine Corps' F/A-18 Hornet Introduction Team (HIT) in the early 1980s, commanded VMFA-531 and MAWTS-1 and was the deputy director for Plans and Policy, United States Central Command, during Operation Enduring Freedom.

Stalder also previously served as the Commanding General, 1st Marine Expeditionary Brigade and Deputy Commanding General, I Marine Expeditionary Force, in Operation Iraqi Freedom I. Later, he became the Wing Commander, 3rd Marine Aircraft Wing during a second tour in the Iraq war and

Stalder commanded the Training and Education Command starting in 2005. He relinquished command to MajGen George J. Flynn on July 21, 2006. In 2006, Stalder become Commanding General of the II Marine Expeditionary Force, and relinquished command to LtGen Dennis J. Hejlik on July 25, 2008.

On February 8, 2008, Stalder was nominated for appointment as the commander, U.S. Marine Corps Forces Pacific; commanding general, Fleet Marine Forces Pacific; and commander, Marine Corps Bases Pacific, and for reappointment to the rank of lieutenant general. He assumed command on August 23, 2008. He relinquished command and retired on September 2, 2010.

== Decorations ==
His personal decorations include:

Naval Aviator Badge
1st Row		Navy Distinguished Service Medal	Defense Superior Service Medal w/ 1 oak leaf cluster	
2nd Row	Legion of Merit	Meritorious Service Medal	Air Medal with 2 Strike/Flight awards	Navy and Marine Corps Commendation Medal w/ 1 award star
3rd Row	Navy and Marine Corps Achievement Medal	Navy Presidential Unit Citation	Joint Meritorious Unit Award	Navy Unit Commendation
4th Row	Navy Meritorious Unit Commendation	National Defense Service Medal w/ 2 service stars	Iraq Campaign Medal	Global War on Terrorism Expeditionary Medal
5th Row	Global War on Terrorism Service Medal	Korea Defense Service Medal	Navy Sea Service Deployment Ribbon w/ 7 service stars	Navy & Marine Corps Overseas Service Ribbon w/ 1 service star
