= Starcom =

Starcom may refer to:

- Space Training and Readiness Command, field command of the United States Space Force
- Starcom: The U.S. Space Force, a 1980s animated TV show
- STARCOM (communications system), a U.S. Army network of the 1950s and 1960s
- Starcom (media agency), part of Publicis Groupe
  - Starcom IP Asia, the digital marketing segment
- Starcom Network, a radio station in Barbados
- StarCom Racing, an American car racing team
- Starcom Systems, a Channel Islands remote tracking company
- Starcom, a collaborative trade name of video game makers Cinematronics, Advanced Microcomputer Systems and Bluth Group
- Starcom: Star Communicator, a 2001 video game for Game Boy Advance

== See also ==
- UTStarcom, a Chinese global telecom infrastructure provider
