= Army (disambiguation) =

An army is a fighting force that fights primarily on land.

Army may also refer to:

== Arts, entertainment, and media ==
- Army (1944 film), a Japanese film directed by Keisuke Kinoshita
- Army (1996 film), a Bollywood film
- "Army" (Ben Folds Five song), by Ben Folds Five from their 1999 album The Unauthorized Biography of Reinhold Messner
- "Army" (Ellie Goulding song), by Ellie Goulding from her 2015 album Delirium
- Army (newspaper), an Australian Army publication
- "Army" (The Job Lot), a British sitcom episode
- Armando "Army" Renta, a fictional character on The Shield, portrayed by Michael Peña
- Army (International Military-Technical Forum)
- ARMY (아미), an abbreviation for Adorable Representative MC for Youth, fan base of the group BTS

== Other uses ==
- Military, or armed forces
- Field army, a large military formation
- Women's Land Army (disambiguation)
- Army Black Knights, the sports teams of the United States Military Academy at West Point
- John Howard (Canadian sprinter) (1888–1937), Canadian sprinter and World War I soldier nicknamed "Army"
- Army+, a Ukrainian mobile application
