= UTC+06:00 =

Identifier for a time offset from UTC of +6

- Time zone
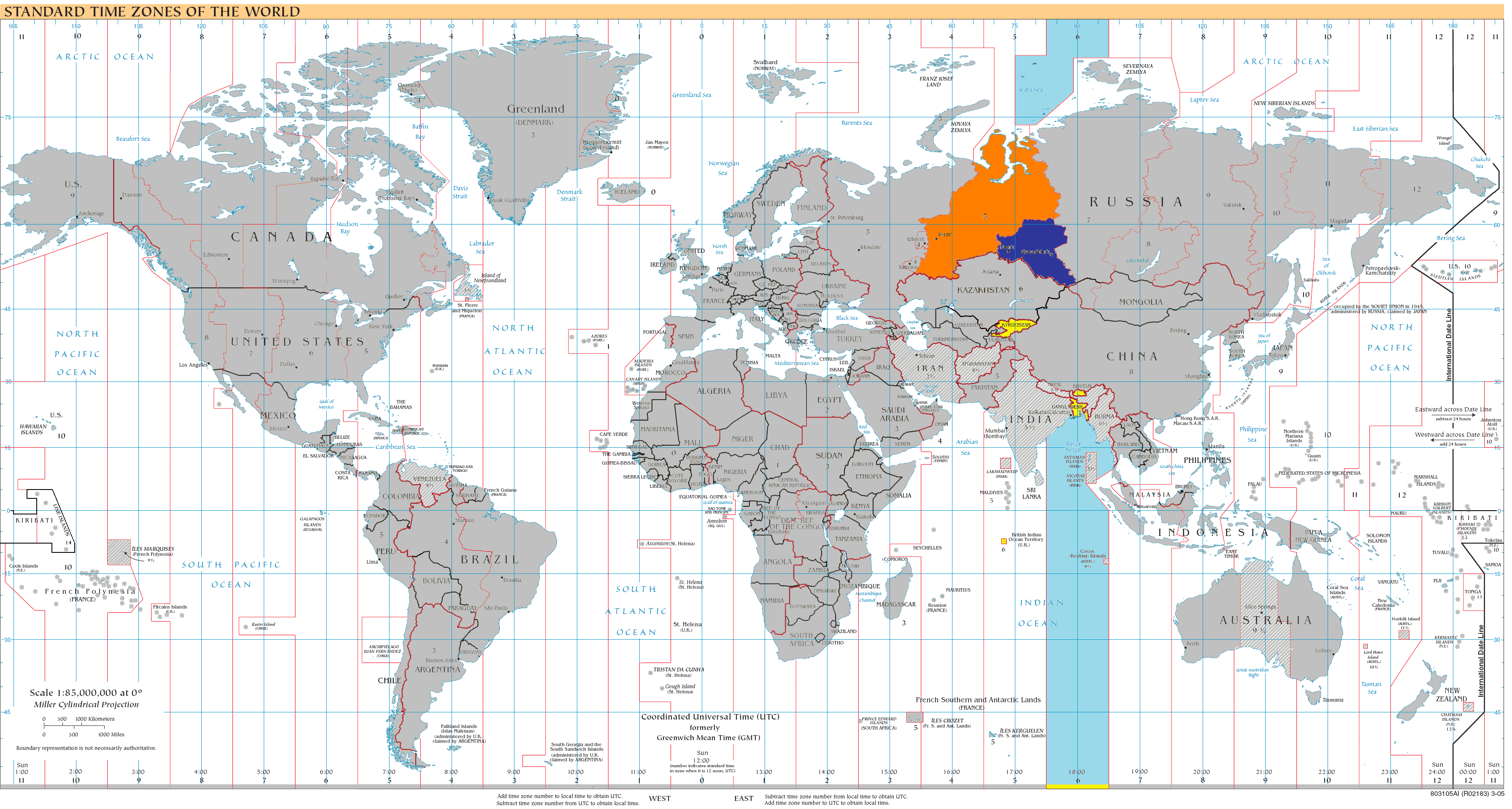
- World map with the time zone highlighted

UTC offset
- UTC: UTC+06:00

Current time
- 06:58, 26 July 2026 UTC+06:00 [refresh]

Central meridian
- 90 degrees E

Date-time group
- F

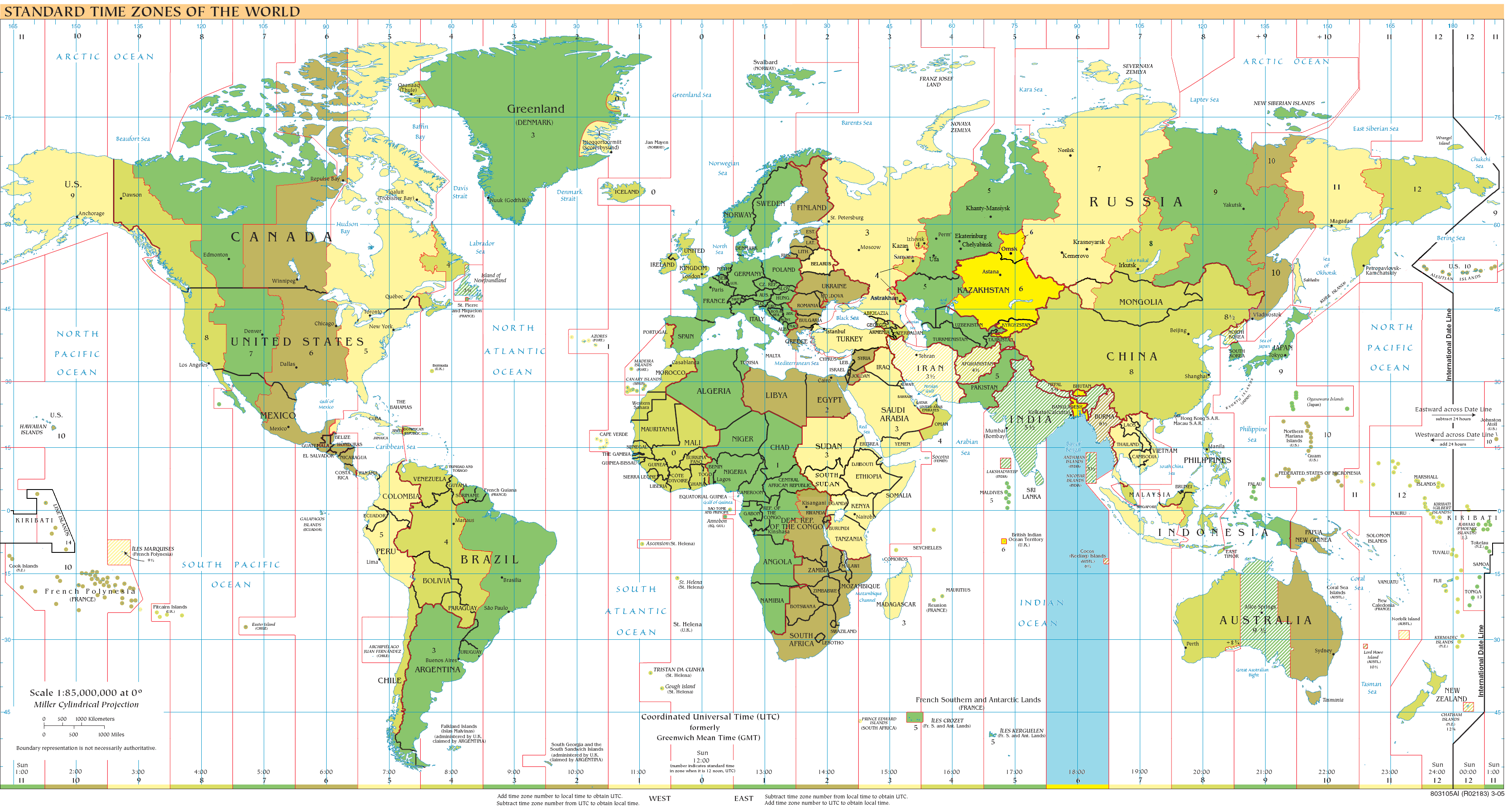
UTC+06:00 – 2010: blue (December), orange (June), yellow (year-round), light blue (sea areas)

Time in Russia: KALT / Kaliningrad Time / UTC+2 / (MSK−1); MSK / Moscow Time / UTC+3 / (MSK±0); SAMT / Samara Time / UTC+4 / (MSK+1); YEKT / Yekaterinburg Time / UTC+5 / (MSK+2); OMST / Omsk Time / UTC+6 / (MSK+3); KRAT / Krasnoyarsk Time / UTC+7 / (MSK+4); IRKT / Irkutsk Time / UTC+8 / (MSK+5); YAKT / Yakutsk Time / UTC+9 / (MSK+6); VLAT / Vladivostok Time / UTC+10 / (MSK+7); MAGT / Magadan Time / UTC+11 / (MSK+8); PETT / Kamchatka Time / UTC+12 / (MSK+9)

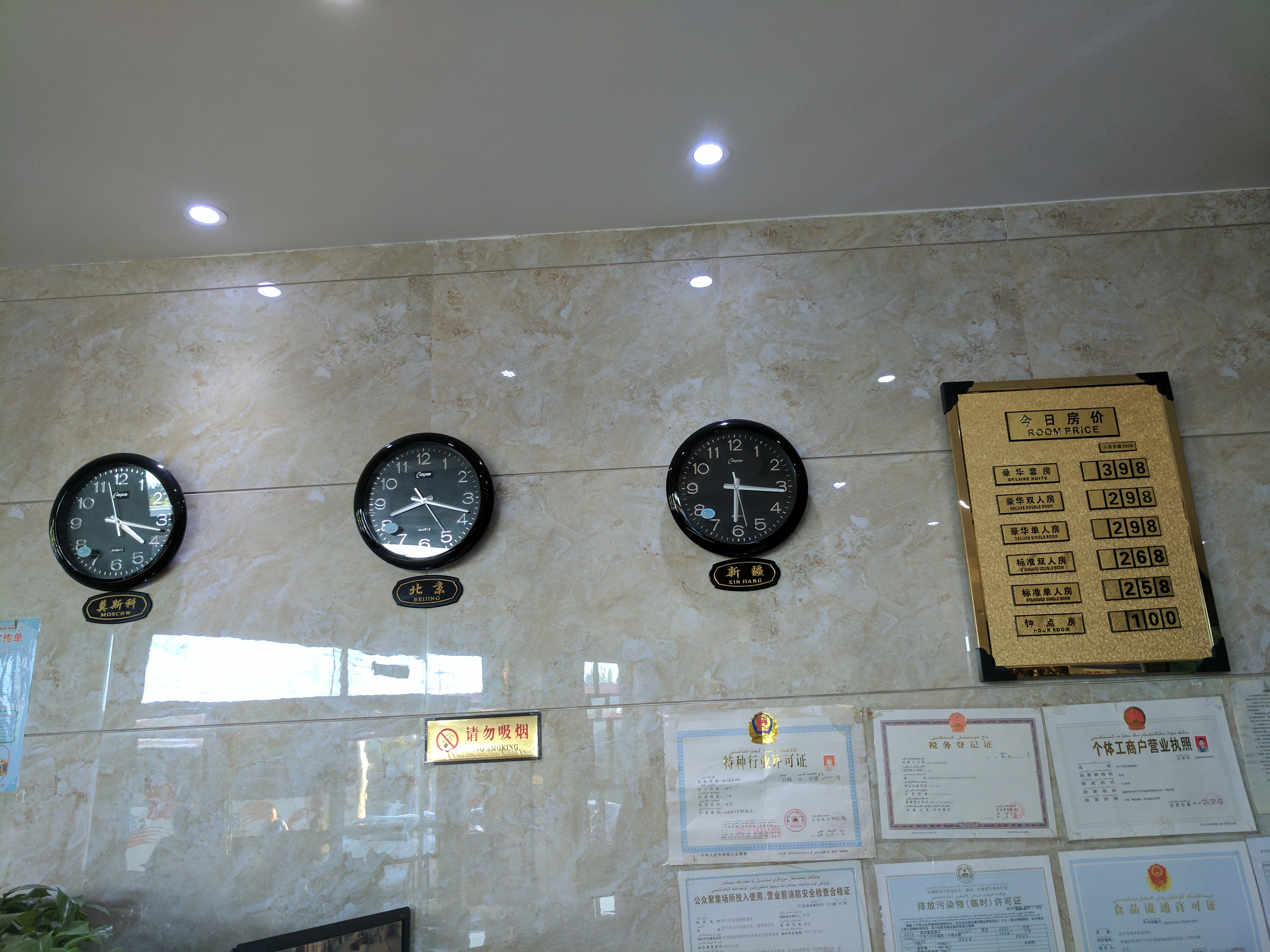
Xinjiang Time (UTC+06:00) is showcased by the clock on the right.

UTC+06:00 is an identifier for a time offset from UTC of +06:00. This time is used in:

== As standard time (year-round) ==
Principal cities: Bishkek, Chittagong, Dhaka, Omsk, Thimphu

=== South Asia ===
- Bangladesh – Bangladesh Standard Time
- Bhutan – Bhutan Time

=== Indian Ocean ===
- United Kingdom
  - British Indian Ocean Territory / Mauritius (see Chagos Archipelago sovereignty dispute)
    - Chagos Archipelago

=== Central Asia ===
- Kyrgyzstan – Kyrgyzstan Time (since August 12, 2005)

=== North Asia ===
- Russia – Omsk Time
  - Siberian Federal District
    - Omsk Oblast

=== Antarctica ===
- Some bases in Antarctica. See also Time in Antarctica.
  - Australia
    - Australian Antarctic Territory
  - Russia
    - Vostok Station

== Discrepancies between official UTC+06:00 and geographical UTC+06:00 ==
=== Areas within UTC+06:00 longitudes using other time zones ===
Using UTC+05:00:

- The very easternmost parts of Ural Federal District, Russia

Using UTC+05:30:

- Parts of India:
  - Assam
  - Meghalaya
  - West Bengal
  - Nagaland
  - Manipur
  - Tripura
  - Mizoram
  - Arunachal Pradesh
  - Bihar
  - Sikkim
  - The northeast part of Andhra Pradesh
  - The eastern part of Uttar Pradesh
  - The northeast part of Chhattisgarh
  - Most of Odisha
  - Andaman and Nicobar Islands

Using UTC+05:45:

- Most of Nepal, with its capital city Kathmandu

Using UTC+06:30:

- Most of Myanmar, including the nation's capital Naypyidaw
- Cocos (Keeling) Islands

Using UTC+07:00:

- The westernmost part of Indonesia including most of the province Aceh with its capital Banda Aceh
- The westernmost part of Mongolia
- Parts of Russia:
  - A large part of Krasnoyarsk Krai
  - Tuva
  - Khakassia
  - Altai Republic
  - Altai Krai
  - Kemerovo Oblast
  - Smaller parts of Novosibirsk Oblast
  - Parts of Tomsk Oblast

Using UTC+08:00:

- Western Mongolia
- Parts of China:
  - Most of Tibet Autonomous Region
  - Most of Xinjiang Uyghur Autonomous Region (see also "Use in Xinjiang")

=== Areas outside UTC+06:00 longitudes using UTC+06:00 time ===
==== Areas between 67°30′ E and 82°30′ E ("physical" UTC+05:00) ====
- Kyrgyzstan
- British Indian Ocean Territory
- Russia
  - Omsk Oblast
- Some island resorts in the Maldives

== Use in Xinjiang ==
In Xinjiang, China, this time offset is known as the Xinjiang Time or Urumqi Time (Uyghur: شىنجاڭ ۋاقتى). It is set due to its geographical location in the westernmost part of China. It has been approved by Chinese authorities for civil purposes since February 1986, although the decision has been rejected by the local ethnic Han population and some Han-dominated regional governments.

According to Human Rights Watch, a Uyghur man was arrested and detained by Chinese authorities in 2018 on "terrorist charges" for setting his watch to Xinjiang Time.

== See also ==
- Bangladesh Standard Time
- Time in Antarctica – some stations use this time zone
- Time in Russia
- Xinjiang Time
