= UTC+06:30 =

Identifier for a time offset from UTC of +6:30

- Time zone
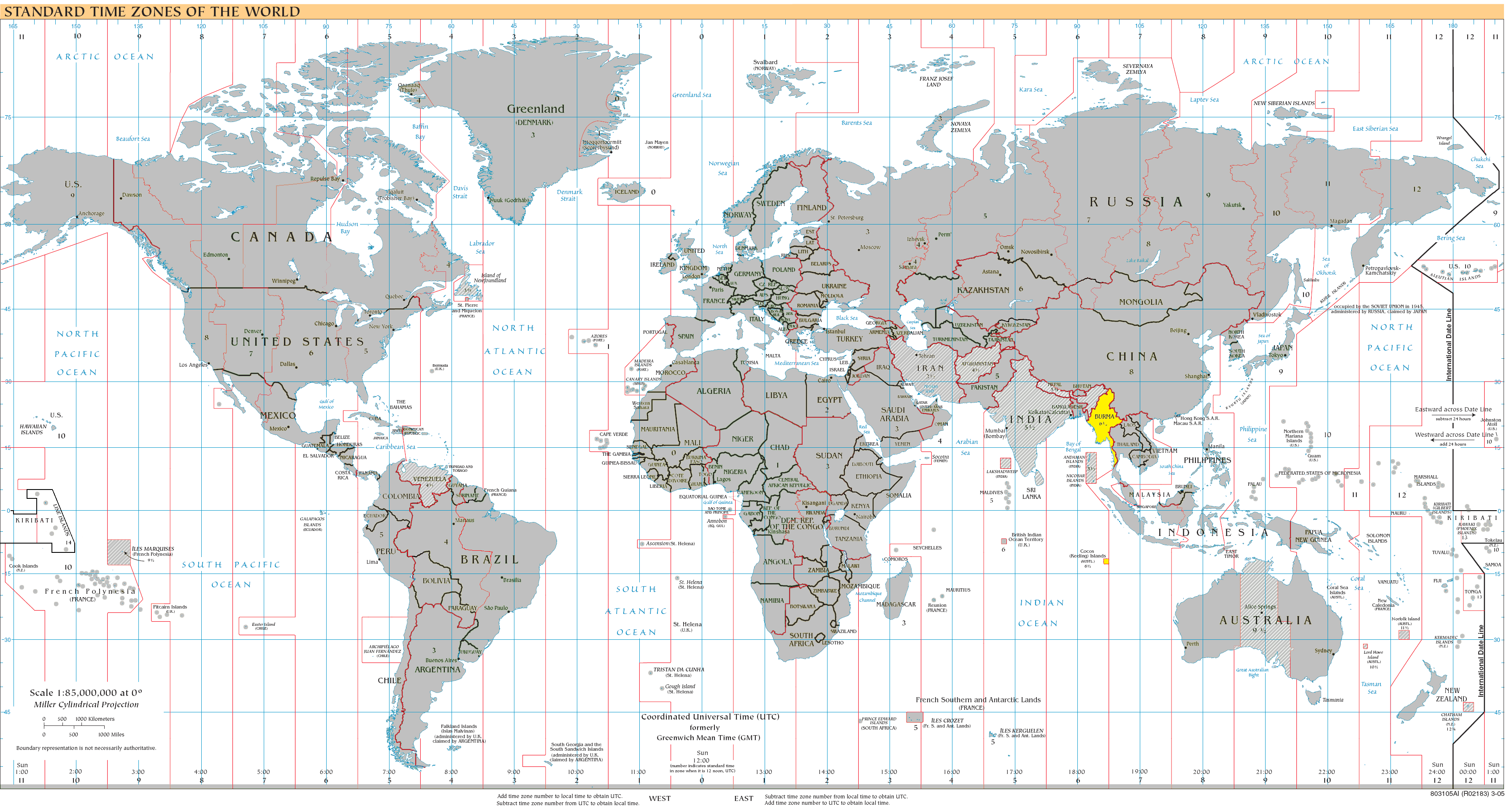
- World map with the time zone highlighted

UTC offset
- UTC: UTC+06:30

Current time
- :: UTC+06:30 [refresh]

Central meridian
- 97.5 degrees E

Date-time group
- F*

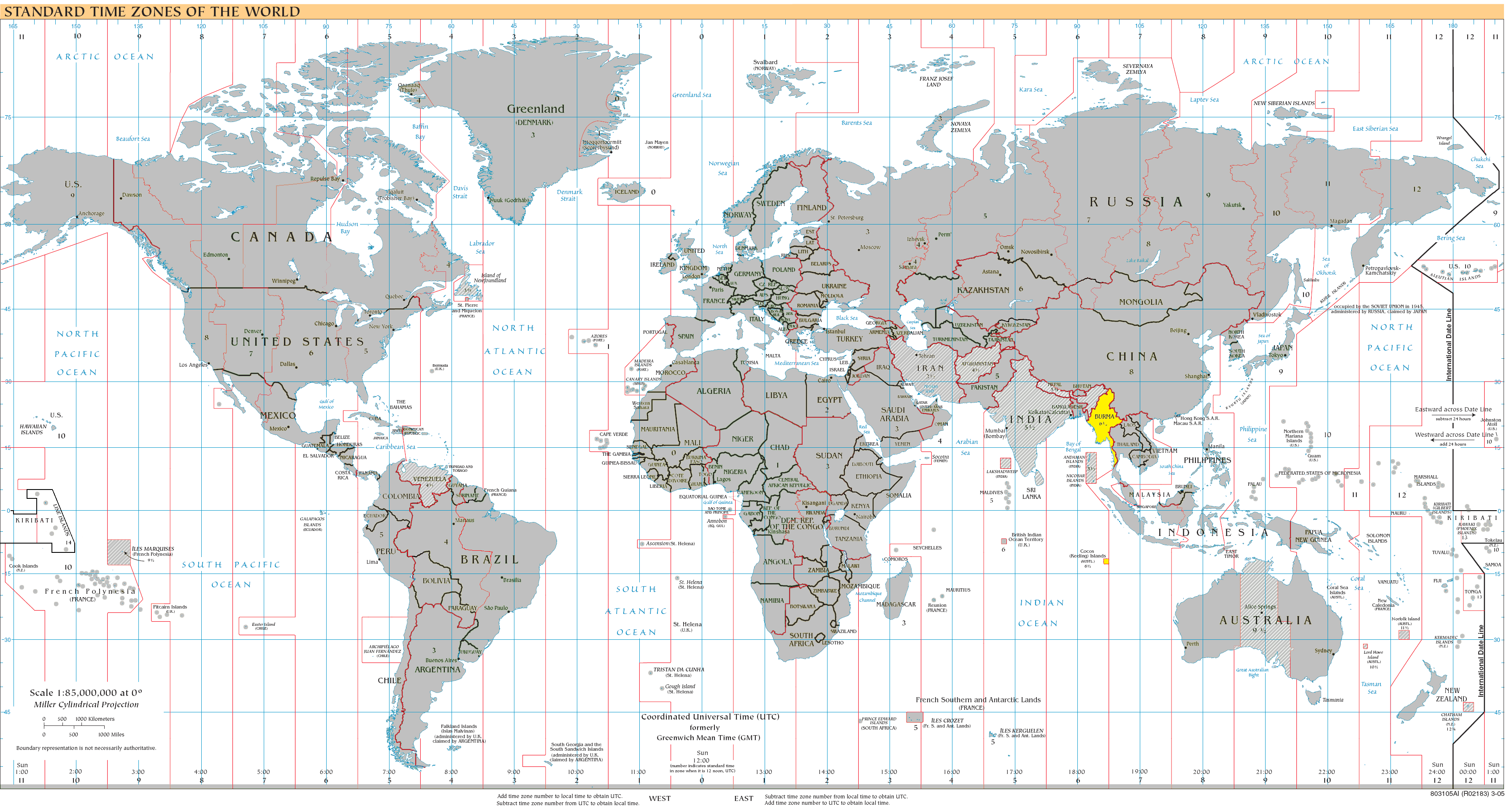
blue (December), orange (June), yellow (year-round), light blue (sea areas)

UTC+06:30 is an identifier for a time offset from UTC of +06:30. In ISO 8601 the associated time would be written as 2026-11-13T07:24:20+06:30. It is 6.5 hours ahead of UTC, meaning that when the time in UTC areas is midnight (00:00), the time in UTC+6:30 areas would be 6:30 in the morning.

== As standard time (year-round) ==
=== Southeast Asia ===
Principal cities: Yangon or Rangoon, Naypyidaw, Mandalay

- Myanmar (Burma) – Myanmar Standard Time

=== Indian Ocean ===
- Coco Island
- Cocos (Keeling) Islands - Cocos Islands Time
