= Delta (situational awareness system) =

Ukrainian situational awareness system

- Developer: Aerorozvidka
- Service name: Situational awareness system for Ukrainian Army
- Available in: Ukrainian, English
- Website: delta.mil.gov.ua

Delta is a situational awareness and battlefield management system developed by the Ukrainian military services for use in the Russo-Ukrainian War, especially following the 2022 Russian invasion of Ukraine.

The system gathers and integrates information from diverse participants, including reconnaissance units, civilian officials, foreign intelligence partners, and vetted bystanders. Sources include commercial and military drones, sensor networks, satellite imagery, and intelligence from partner countries. Geolocated data is mapped in real time, along with pictures of enemy assets.

Delta covers a wide range of battlefield management tasks, including the planning of operations and combat missions, coordination between units, and secure exchange of information about the location of enemy forces.

On the backend side, it's a cloud native environment. On the client side, it runs on regular PCs, laptop, tablets or mobile phones.

Involved in the development and supervision of the system are the Center for Innovation and Development of Defense Technologies of the Ministry of Defense of Ukraine, the NGO Aerorozvidka and Mykhailo Fedorov, Minister of the Ukrainian Ministry of Digital Transformation.

The system became broadly operational in August 2022. The software was developed in coordination with NATO. The system was first tested in 2017, as part of a NATO initiative "to wean troops off Russian standards of siloing information among ground units instead of sharing it". Ukraine surprised NATO in quickly making this system even more accessible to troops than "more modern militaries". Delta, in its prototype phase, was first "pressed to its limits" during the Ukrainian counteroffensive to the Russian Kyiv convoy. The Ukrainian Defense Ministry credits Delta for helping identify 1500 confirmed, Russian targets daily during this time period.

In December 2022, Delta was the target of an adversarial phishing endeavor.

On 4 February 2023, the Ukrainian government gave approval to full deployment of the Delta system to the Armed Forces of Ukraine and permitted hosting of Delta's cloud-components outside of Ukraine to protect it against missile and cyber attacks.

== Centrality of drone warfare ==
Aerorozvidka specializes in aerial reconnaissance and drone warfare and their main contribution to Delta likely lies in this sphere. Delta, in this view, serves as a key link between raw reconnaissance (often remote photographic telemetry), identification, prioritization, and attack, facilitating a more rapid response cycle across diverse and dispersed participants and resources, known in military parlance as the kill chain.

Systems such as Delta are poised to become a key information-management component of the rapid evolution of drone warfare on the modern battlefield. Mykhailo Fedorov, Minister of Digital Transformation, would like to see 10,000 drones operating continuously along the front lines. This vision entails a substantial network of digital coordination.

For reasons of ongoing operations security, the precise nature of the integration between Delta and drone warfare remains undisclosed.

== Avengers AI platform ==
Avengers is an artificial intelligence platform developed by the Centre for Innovation and Development of Defence Technologies of the Ministry of Defence of Ukraine for automatic detection and classification of enemy military hardware in video footage from drones and stationary cameras. The platform operates as an integrated component of the Vezha module within the Delta ecosystem.

The system automatically identifies enemy ground vehicles — including tanks, infantry fighting vehicles, and light equipment — directly from drone video streams. According to the Ministry of Defence, the platform detects approximately 12,000 enemy targets per week, processing footage across dozens of simultaneous video feeds. The AI model is continuously retrained on new combat data to improve recognition accuracy in challenging conditions, including camouflaged vehicles and equipment in low visibility conditions or moving across difficult terrain.

As of 2025, the platform detected approximately 70% of enemy equipment visible in video streams, with a detection time of approximately 2.2 seconds per target. These figures were presented by Deputy Minister of Defence Kateryna Chernohorenko at the London Defence Conference in May 2025, where the Ministry showcased Delta and Avengers to an international audience of defence officials and partners. Chernohorenko described the platform as “unique in the world in terms of the volume of video data on enemy vehicles,” and stated that development of Avengers and other AI solutions was ongoing, with plans to expand cloud capabilities and integrate AI directly onto drone systems.

In February 2025, the Ministry of Defence presented Delta, Avengers, and the UA DRONE ID friendly-drone identification technology at the NATO TIDE Sprint 2025 conference in Helsinki, demonstrating their operation under real combat conditions to NATO partners.

The Delta combat system, including the Vezha module and Avengers platform, passed an independent two-months cybersecurity assessment in early 2026 covering more than 160 requirements, with no non-compliant findings. A previous independent assessment had been conducted in July 2024.

== See also ==
- Command and control
- Defense industry of Ukraine
- Drone warfare
- GIS Arta
- Intelligence, surveillance, target acquisition, and reconnaissance
- SitaWare
