= UTC−08:30 =

Former time zone in Pitcairn Islands

- Time zone

UTC offset
- UTC: UTC−08:30

Current time
- 16:25, 5 March 2025 UTC−08:30 [refresh]

Central meridian

Date-time group

UTC−08:30 is an identifier for a time offset from UTC of −08:30.

== History ==
This offset was used in Pitcairn Islands until April 26, 1998. On April 27, the time zone was changed to UTC−08:00, so after 23:59:59, it became 00:30:00.
