= UTC+03:30 =

Time zone

- Time zone
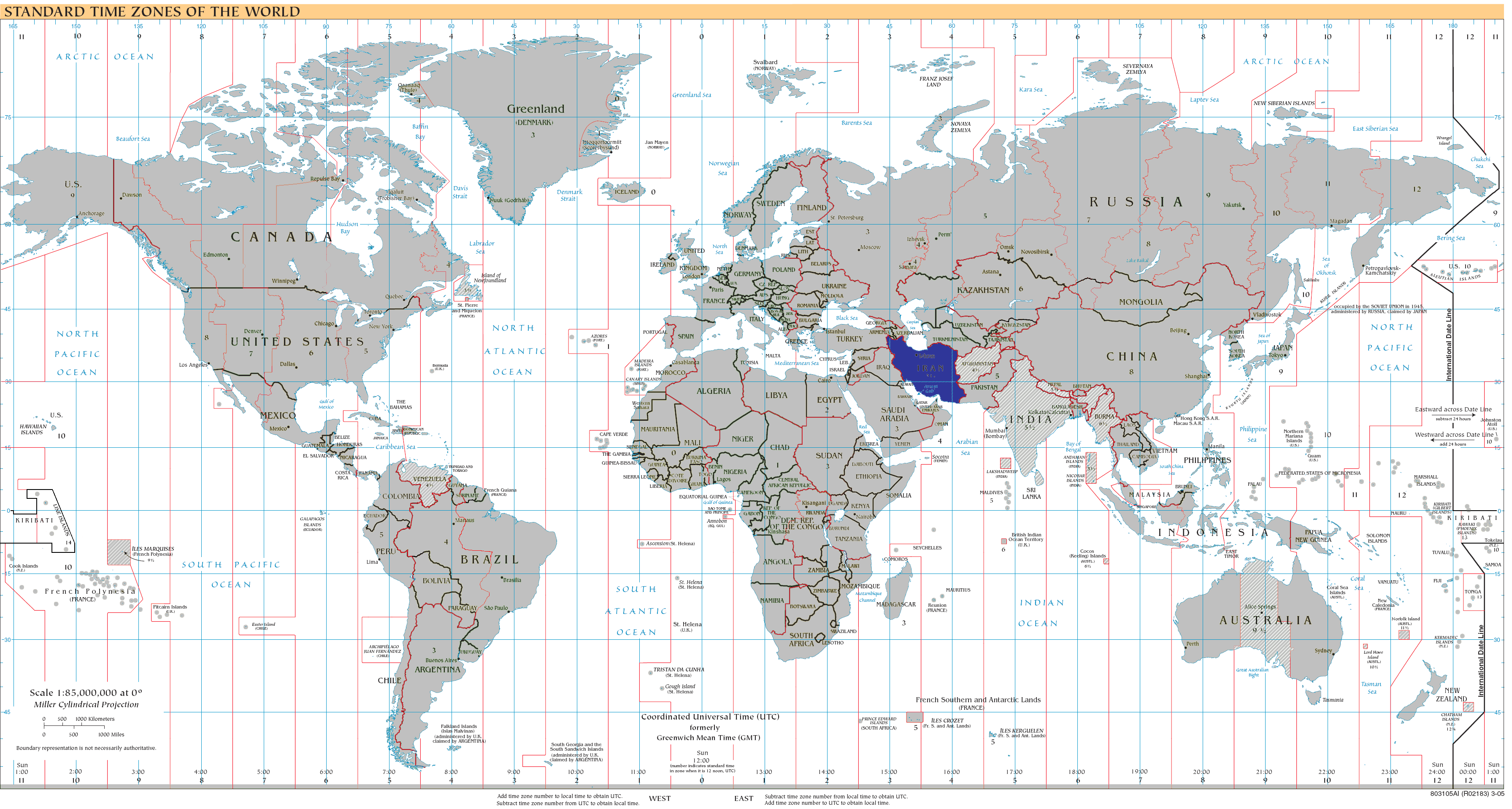
- World map with the time zone highlighted

UTC offset
- UTC: UTC+03:30

Current time
- 02:20, 27 May 2026 UTC+03:30 [refresh]

Central meridian
- 52.5 degrees E

Date-time group
- C*

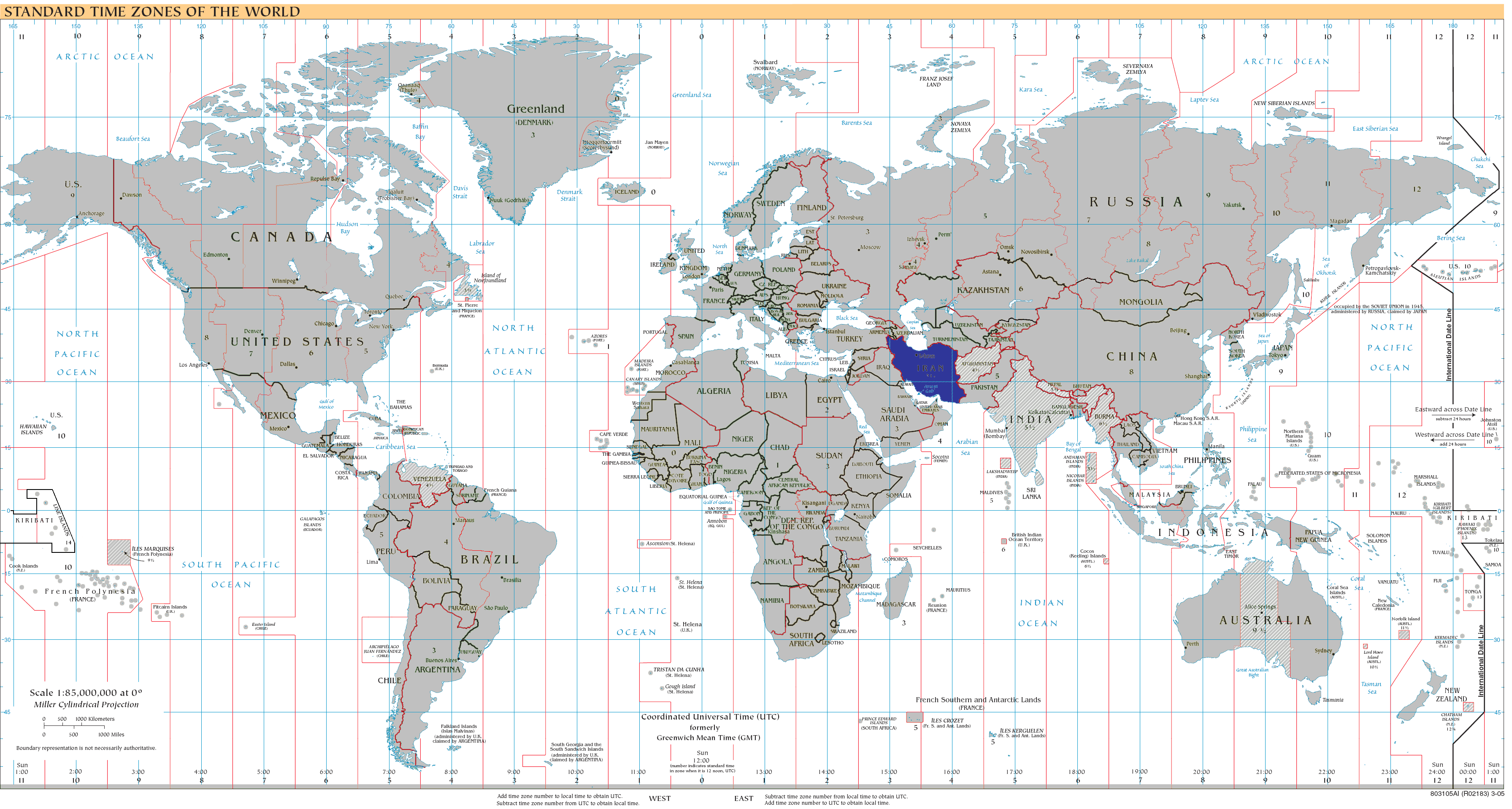
GMT+03:30: blue (year-round)

UTC+03:30 is an identifier for a time offset from UTC of +03:30. In ISO 8601 the associated time would be written as 2026-05-27T02:20:33+03:30. This time is used only in Iran, so it is also called Iran Standard Time.

== As standard time (year-round) ==
=== Asia ===
Principal cities: Tehran, Mashhad, Isfahan, Karaj, Shiraz, Tabriz, Qom, Ahvaz

- Iran – Iran Standard Time (IRST)
