= Healthcare Denmark =

Healthcare Denmark, styled as Healthcare DENMARK and formerly known as Danish: Sundheds- og Velfærdskonsortiet (The Consortium for Health and Wellbeing) is a Danish nonprofit organization that works to promote international awareness of Danish health and care solutions. The overall objective of the organization is to contribute to an increased export of Danish health solutions as well as to increase innovation and foreign investment in the Danish healthcare sector.

Healthcare Denmark has offices located in Odense and Copenhagen and has approximately 15-20 employees. In addition to organizing and participating in international conferences and visits by delegations to and from Denmark, Healthcare Denmark promotes Danish healthcare expertise through initiatives in international, professional and social media, ain the foreign press and through its website, films, magazines, and presentations.

== Establishment and funding ==
Healthcare Denmark was created in 2012 as part of a plan at the ministerial level to establish seven consortia to market selected Danish positions of strength. Healthcare Denmark rests on the assumption that "[Danish] strengths in the sphere of health and care demonstrate not least a good and effective collaboration between public and private actors on solutions for tasks in the area of health." It was established based on an action plan developed by the then government and other political parties, and funding comes partly from grants and partly from the consortium partners.

== Nation of Health visitor centre ==
On October 28, 2020, Healthcare DENMARK had their new visitor centre, Nation of Health, inaugurated by Crown Princess Mary. The visitor centre is designed to welcome international delegation visits with foreign ministers, business leaders and decision-makers, and thereby strengthen the international branding and promotion of Danish products and solutions within the health and welfare area. Nation of Health features narrated videos, interactive screens and much more, which showcases Danish healthcare solutions as well as the strengths of the Danish healthcare model as whole.

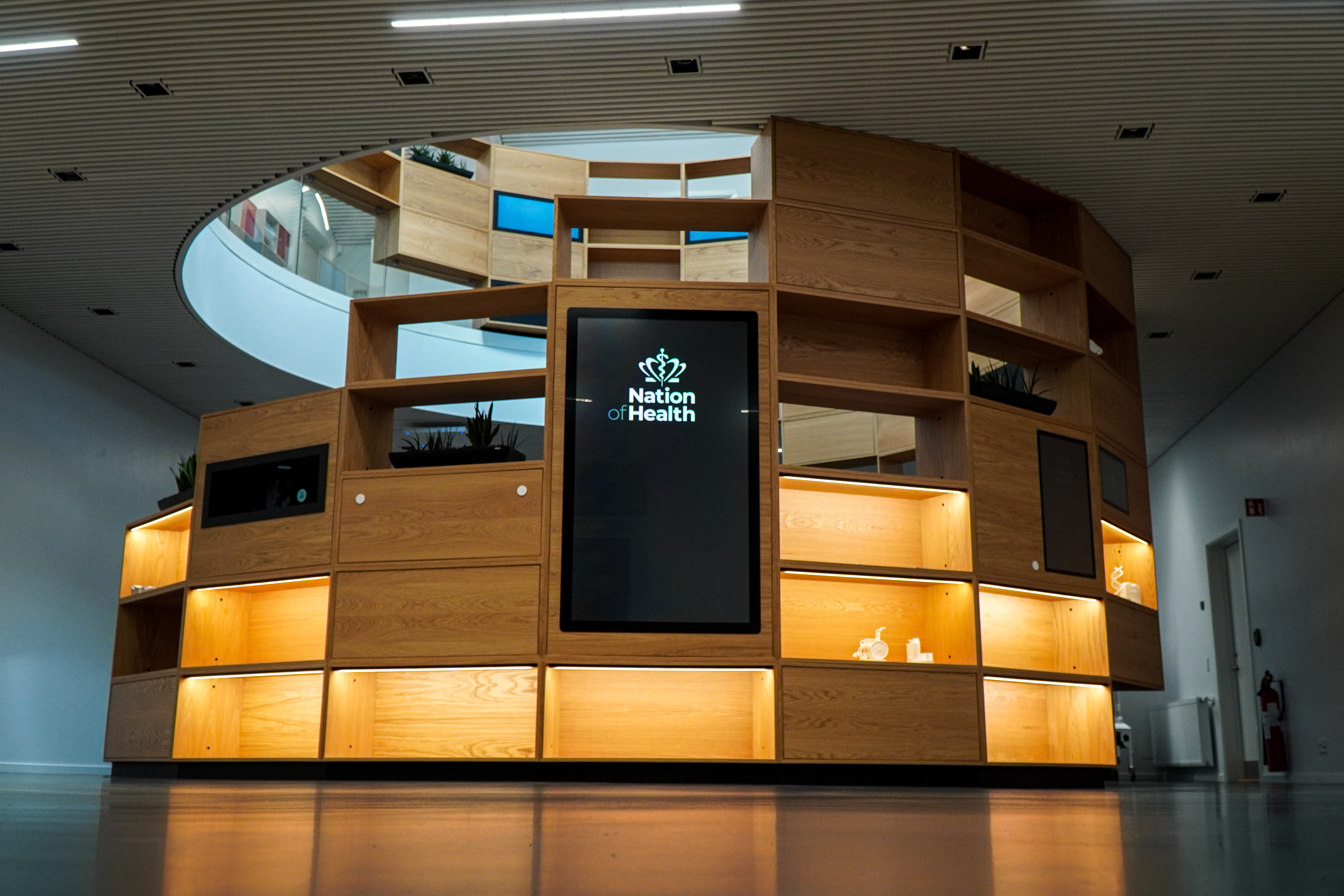

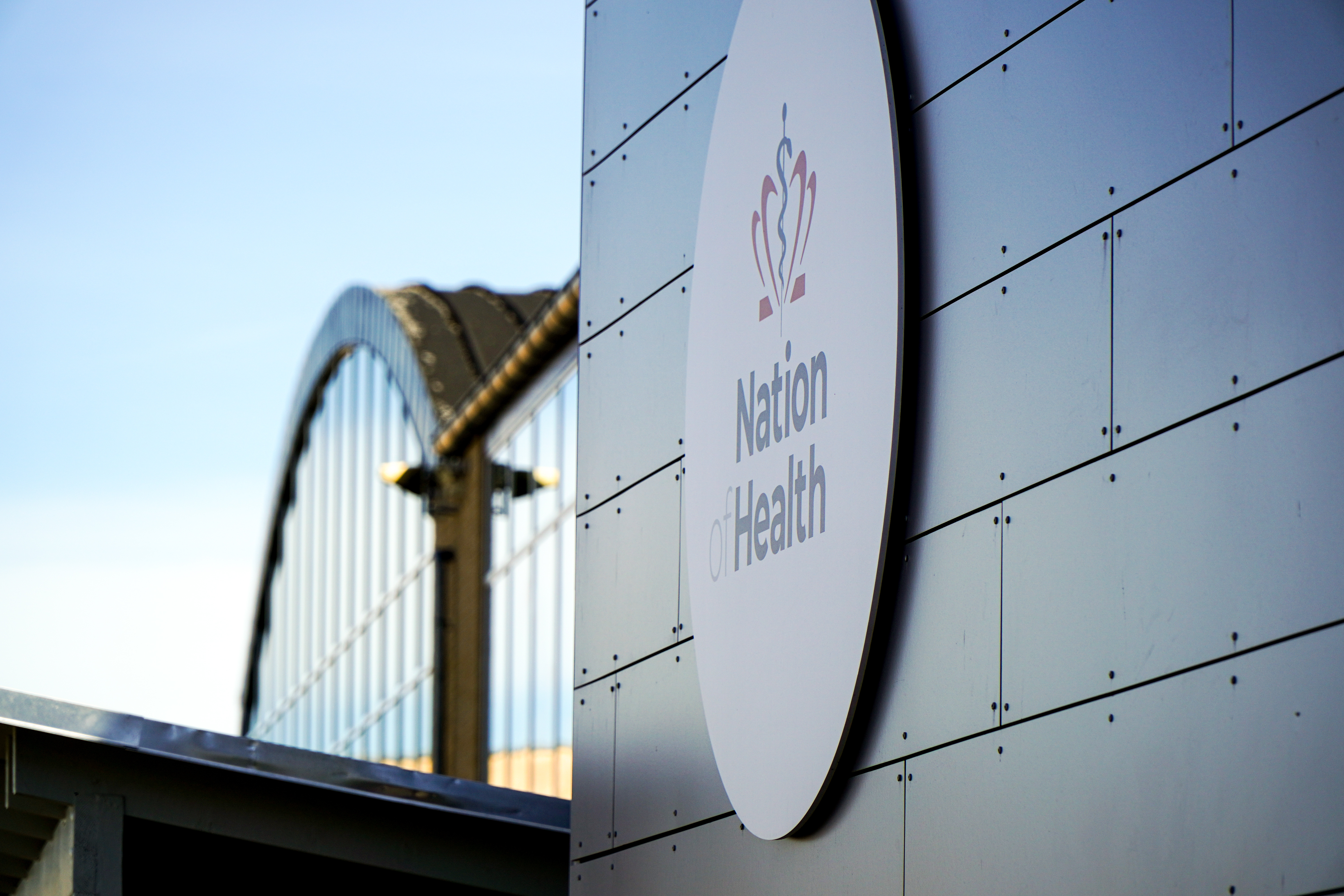

== Virtual showroom - virtual visitor centre ==
On October 27, 2021, Healthcare DENMARK launched a new digital visitor centre with the purpose to further strengthening the international branding and promotion of innovative Danish healthcare products and solutions. The virtual visitor centre, called Virtual Showroom, features a digital version of the Nation of Health visitor centre, as well as 3 virtual rooms covering the Danish approach to topics of Assisted living, Innovative Hospitals, and Chrnoc care and Mental health.

== Partners ==
Healthcare Denmark is a public-private partnership of the Danish Ministries of Health, Economic and Business Affairs, and Foreign Affairs, Danske Regioner (an organization of the five regions of Denmark), the Region of Southern Denmark, Dansk Erhverv (the Danish Chamber of Commerce), the Confederation of Danish Industries, and the companies Falck, KMD, and Systematic A/S. All partners are represented on Healthcare Denmark's board of directors, which is headed by Sten Scheibye.

== Patronage ==
Crown Princess Mary is the patron for Healthcare Denmark and in this capacity actively supports the consortium’s Danish and foreign activities, including conferences and large business delegations.
