= Military Message Handling System =

Military Message Handling System (MMHS) is a profile and set of extensions to X.400 for messaging in military environments. It is NATO standard STANAG 4406 and CCEB standard ACP 123. It adds to standard X.400 email support for military requirements such as mandatory access control (i.e. Classified/Secret/Top Secret messages and users, etc.). In particular it defines a new message format, P772 that is used in place of X.400's interpersonal message formats P2 (1984 standard) and P22 (1988 standard).

MMHS specifications are implemented by several X.400 vendors, particularly those located in Europe, such as Raytheon UK, Boldon James, Deep-Secure, Thales Group, Nexor, Cassidian and Isode.

Several RFC are supported:

== Implementations ==
vendor	Software	Security evaluation
Thales Group	XOmail	CC EAL 4
Isode	M-Switch	NA
Systematic	IRIS	MIL-STD-6017
EID	MOST-4 MMHS	NA

== See also ==
- Defense Message System
- Automated Message Handling System
