= Kateryna Chernohorenko =

Ukrainian politician and digital transformation specialist

- Катерина Черногоренко
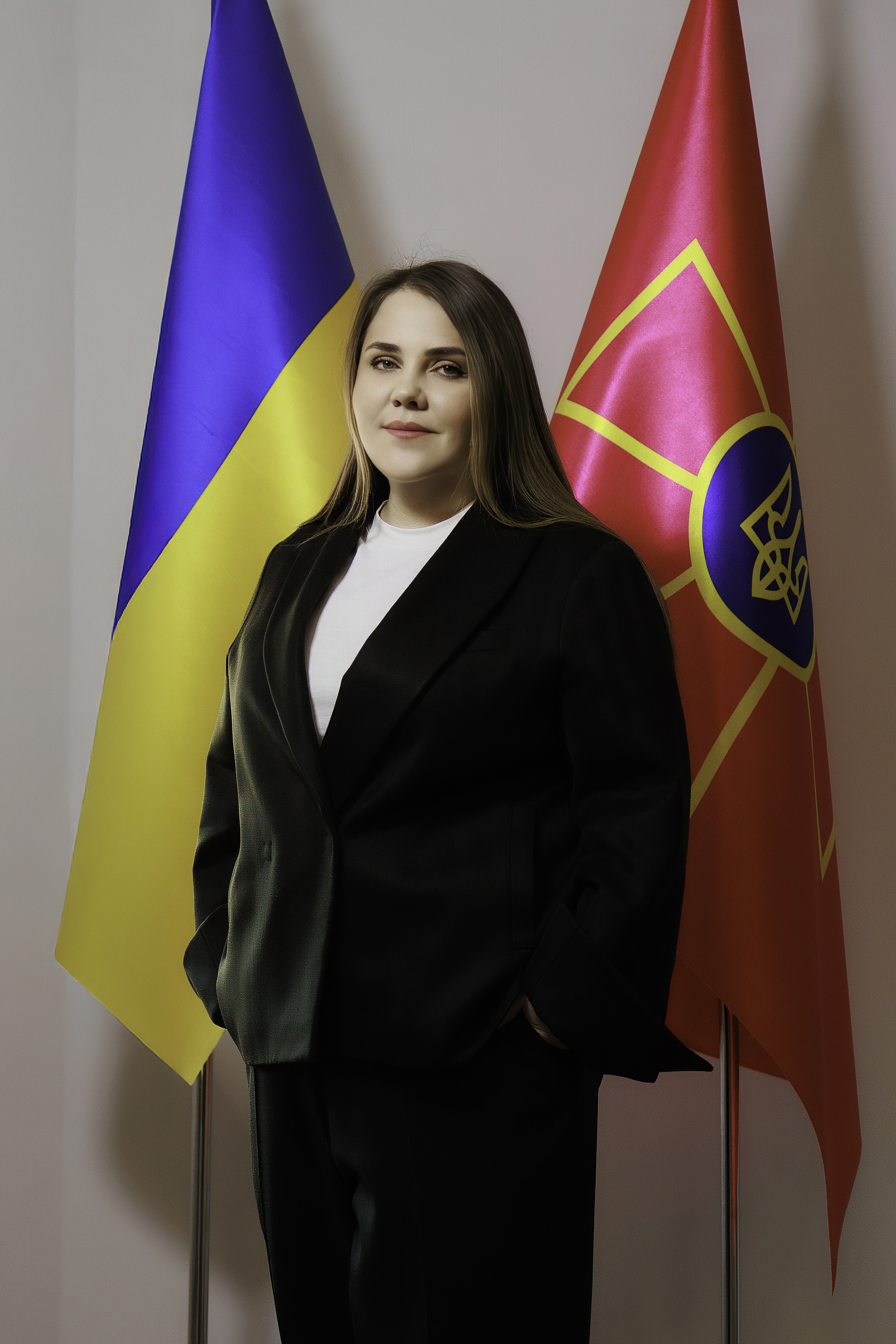

Deputy Minister of Defense of Ukraine
- In office September 2023 – July 2025
- President: Volodymyr Zelenskyy
- Prime Minister: Denys Shmyhal
- Minister: Rustem Umerov

Personal details
- Born: October 2, 1986 (age 40) Reni, Odesa Oblast, Ukraine
- Citizenship: Ukraine
- Education: National University Odesa Law Academy (LL.M.); National University of Kyiv-Mohyla Academy (MPA); Kyiv-Mohyla Business School; Stanford University
- Occupation: Digital transformation leader Defense industry advisor Lecturer
- Known for: Digital governance, information technology, defense industry
- Awards

Kateryna Chernohorenko (Ukrainian: Катерина Черногоренко; born 2 October 1986) is a Ukrainian public official, specialist in e-governance, and digital transformation architect in the defense sector. She served as Deputy Minister of Defense of Ukraine for Digital Development, Digital Transformation, and Digitalization from September 2023 to July 2025, overseeing the digital transformation of Ukraine’s defense sector during the full-scale Russian invasion of Ukraine.

During her tenure, she led the launch of the Reserve+ and Army+ mobile applications, oversaw the scaling of the DELTA situational awareness and battlefield management system, coordinated two international coalitions — Drone Coalition and IT Coalition — under the Ukraine Defense Contact Group (Ramstein format), established the Cyber Incident Response Centre, and initiated the creation of the Space Policy Directorate within the Ministry of Defense of Ukraine.

== Early life and education ==
Kateryna Chernohorenko was born on 2 October 1986, in Reni, Odesa Oblast. In 2008, she graduated from the National University Odesa Law Academy with a Master of Laws degree (LL.M.). In 2022, she earned a Master’s degree in Public Administration from the National University of Kyiv-Mohyla Academy.

In 2026, she graduated from the Kyiv-Mohyla Business School, having attended the Presidents' MBA program, as well as Stanford University's Fisher Family Summer Fellows Program.

== Professional career ==
=== Legal practice (2006–2018) ===
From 2006 to 2018, Chernohorenko worked in the legal field and practiced law.

=== Ministry of Digital Transformation (2019–2022) ===
In 2019, she joined the Ministry of Digital Transformation of Ukraine where she contributed to the development and launch of digital public services within the Diia application, including the eMalyatko (eBaby) (Ukrainian: єМалятко) service for electronic birth registration, electronic sick leave certificates, and COVID-19 vaccination certificates.

=== Army of Drones initiative (2022–2023) ===
In July 2022, Chernohorenko initiated the "Army of Drones" project — Ukraine’s first comprehensive state initiative for the development of military unmanned aerial vehicles. The project facilitated large-scale drone procurement for the Armed Forces of Ukraine, the training of 20,000 UAV operators, and the creation of the world’s first specialized UAV strike companies.

=== Deputy Minister of Defense of Ukraine (2023–2025) ===
From September 2023 to July 2025, Chernohorenko served as the Deputy Minister of Defense of Ukraine for Digital Development, Digital Transformation, and Digitization, leading the digital overhaul of the defense sector.

In a February 2024 interview with Reuters, Chernohorenko described the rationale for military digitization: “In wartime, we need to constantly fight for time — for a commander’s time, for a soldier’s time — and this time can be won through digital solutions.” She characterized the then-current volume of paperwork as “unacceptable” during wartime, and said her goal was to undo a legacy of red tape and build a “person-centric” army through online services.

==== Digital services for military personnel, conscripts, and reservists ====
During her tenure as the Deputy Minister of Defense, Chernohorenko oversaw the launch of two major mobile applications.

Reserve+ (Ukrainian: Резерв+), released on 18 May 2024, provides conscripts and reservists with a digital personal account for managing military registration, obtaining electronic military ID documents, applying for deferments, and submitting referrals to the Military Medical Commission. As of December 2025, the application had over 6 million users.

Army+ (Ukrainian: Армія+), launched on 8 August 2024 at an event attended by President Volodymyr Zelenskyy, provides active-duty service members with electronic reports, an Army ID, online training courses, and unit transfer requests. The application was described by Prime Minister Denys Shmyhal at its launch as “Diia for the military, created by the military, and tailored to soldiers’ needs.” As of late 2025, the application had over 1 million registered users and was used by 70% of military units to process reports — with 1.3 million electronic reports submitted at the time.

In 2024, under Chernohorenko’s direction, the Ministry of Defense eliminated 16 paper property accounting logs, consolidated 12 personnel records logs into a single digital document, cancelled shelf labels and stacking cards for warehouses, cancelled the commission for the acceptance and transfer of military property, and enabled the use of qualified electronic signatures for primary documents and military property records — reducing the administrative burden on unit commanders.

In 2025, Chernohorenko launched a reform of the Military Medical Commissions (Ukrainian: ВЛК), digitizing referrals and conclusions to make medical fitness assessments more transparent and accessible for citizens. The reform enabled service members and conscripts to obtain electronic MMC referrals through the Reserve+ application without visiting a recruitment office in person.

==== Battlefield technologies ====
Chernohorenko oversaw the scaling of the DELTA battlefield situational awareness system across all branches of the Armed Forces of Ukraine, and its certification under NATO interoperability standards in 2024.

Under her direction, the Avengers artificial intelligence platform — developed by the Centre for Innovation and Development of Defense Technologies of the Ministry of Defense — was integrated into the Vezha video-analysis module of DELTA. Avengers automatically detects and classifies enemy ground vehicles from drone and camera footage. As of 2025, the platform detected approximately 70% of enemy equipment visible in video streams, identifying targets with a detection time of approximately 2.2 seconds. Chernohorenko announced these figures at the London Defence Conference in May 2025, characterising Avengers as “unique in the world in terms of the volume of video data on enemy vehicles.”

In February 2025, DELTA, Avengers, and the UA DRONE ID friendly-drone identification technology were presented to NATO partners at the TIDE Sprint 2025 conference in Helsinki.

==== Logistics and cybersecurity ====
In 2024, during Chernohorenko’s tenure, the logistics system DOT-Chain was introduced to improve military supply chain management.

In late 2024, it was followed by DOT-Chain Defense, a digital marketplace for the procurement of weapons and ammunition.

As of March 2026, combat brigades of the Defense Forces of Ukraine received over 500,000 items, including FPV drones, ground robotic systems, electronic warfare (EW) equipment, interceptor drones, and UAVs of various types through the DOT-Chain Defense system. The total value of the deliveries exceeded 23.3 billion hryvnias.

Chernohorenko also initiated the establishment of the Ministry of Defense Cyber Incident Response Center, responsible for coordinating the protection of military IT infrastructure and investigating cyber incidents. During the IT Arena Conference in September 2024, she described creating the center as “one of her main tasks upon taking office in 2023.”

In March 2025, Chernohorenko initiated the creation of the Space Policy Directorate within the Ministry of Defense to develop defense-related space policy and consolidate both internal and external capabilities to advance Ukraine’s military space sector.

=== Departure from office (2025) ===
In July 2025, Chernohorenko resigned as Deputy Minister of Defense after nearly two years in the position, as part of a broader government reshuffle.

In a statement on social media, she described the period as “the toughest and most responsible job of my life,” and listed Reserve+, Army+, the DELTA combat awareness platform, the DOT-Chain logistics solution, the space programme, cyber defense, and international partnerships among the key outcomes of her tenure. “We have set high standards for efficiency, and I sincerely hope that next CDTOs will continue to move forward at the same pace. Something remarkable has happened — the Ministry of Defense can no longer avoid digitalization,” she wrote.

In a July 2025 opinion piece published in “Breaking Defense” before her resignation, Chernohorenko argued that Ukraine’s experience of digitizing military administration under fire offered lessons for NATO allies.

== Academic career ==
In 2025, Chernohorenko joined the Kyiv-Mohyla School of Government (named after Andrii Meleshevych) as a senior lecturer, where she teaches the course “E-Governance, Document Management, and Digital Democracy.”

In November 2025, Chernohorenko joined the digital transformation programme at the High Qualification Commission of Judges of Ukraine as a Programme Lead.

She continued her participation in international forums as a speaker and panelist, appearing at IT Arena 2025 in Lviv and the e-Governance Conference 2025 in Tallinn, where she spoke on military digitization and the lessons of Ukraine’s wartime GovTech experience for allied nations.

In 2026, Chernohorenko announced the launch of "Chief Strategic Officer in Defence" course aimed at the owners and employees of defense tech companies.

== International partnerships ==
In June 2023, Chernohorenko headed the IT Coalition within the Ukraine Defense Contact Group (Ramstein format), bringing together 17 partner countries to support Ukraine in IT, communications, and cyber defense. Over the following two years, the coalition mobilized more than €1.1 billion to strengthen the IT infrastructure of Ukraine’s Ministry of Defense and Armed Forces.

In February 2024, she assumed leadership of the Drone Coalition, an international group of 18 countries coordinating the production and supply of unmanned aerial systems to Ukraine. Within two years, the coalition raised over €2.2 billion for UAV procurement.

== Legislative activity ==
During her tenure at the Ministry of Defense of Ukraine, Chernohorenko and her team initiated and supported a set of legislative measures aimed at creating the legal framework for digital transformation in military administration and mobilization.

Key initiatives included:

- Draft law No. 12066, which established the legal basis for a Unified State Register of Servicemen as a central source of personnel data for defense workforce management.
- Draft law No. 12093, which introduced digital enforcement of administrative liability, including the payment of electronic fines through the Reserve+ application.
- Draft law No. 10062, which allowed military information systems to be hosted in cloud environments in NATO member states, enabled integration of state registries for the Oberih system, and introduced an electronic account for persons liable for military service.

== Awards and recognition ==
=== State awards ===
In 2022, Chernohorenko received awards from the Ministry of Defense of Ukraine: a badge of honor "For the Assistance to the Army" and a medal "For Strengthening the Defense Capability of Ukraine".

That same year, she was awarded the Commander-in-Chief's badge "For the Assistance to the Armed Forces of Ukraine" and an honorary medal from the 92nd Separate Assault Brigade named after Ivan Sirko.

In 2023, she was awarded the Security Service of Ukraine distinction "For the Assistance to Counterintelligence" (2nd class).

In 2024, Chernohorenko received the Cross of Honor (Ukrainian: "Хрест пошани") — a Ministry of Defense award granted for outstanding personal contributions to the development of the defensive capabilities of the Armed Forces of Ukraine.

=== Personal recognition ===
In 2025, Chernohorneko was included in DOU Awards’ list of “Inspiring People of the Year in Technology”, Ukrainska Pravda’s ranking of the “100 Most Influential Women in Ukraine”, and GovInsider’s “Women in GovTech 2025” list.

== See also ==
- Reserve+
- Army+
- Delta (situational awareness system)
- Diia
- Ministry of Defence of Ukraine
- Ministry of Digital Transformation (Ukraine)
- Ukraine Defense Contact Group
