= Telos Corporation =

American information technology company

- Type: Public
- Traded as: Nasdaq: TLS
- Industry: Information Technology; Cybersecurity
- Founded: 1969; 57 years ago
- Headquarters: Ashburn, Virginia, U.S.
- Key people: John B. Wood (president and CEO)
- Revenue: ▲$219.2 Million (2019)
- Number of employees: 508
- Website: telos.com

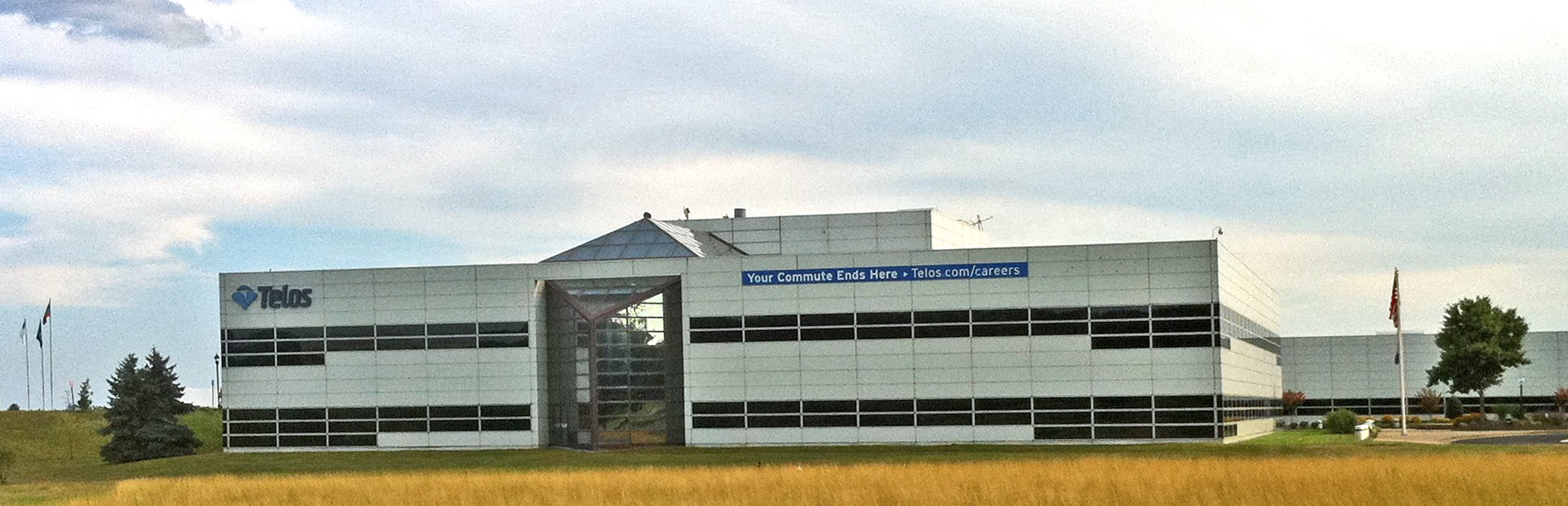
Telos' Ashburn headquarters

Telos Corporation is an information technology and cybersecurity company located in Ashburn, Virginia. Telos primarily serves government and enterprise clients, receiving a large number of its contracts from the United States Department of Defense. Customers are primarily military, intelligence and civilian agencies of the U.S. government and NATO allies.

== History ==
Telos was founded in 1969 in Santa Monica, California and incorporated in Maryland in 1971.

In the fall of 1984, Telos released the FileVision program for the Apple Macintosh. InfoWorld magazine gave it an honorable mention in its Product of the Year for database applications.

John B. Wood joined the company in 1992, and became president and chief executive in 1994. Today, Telos is headquartered in Ashburn, Virginia.

The company had revenues of $200 million in 1996.

On 16 June 2020, Telos Corporation reported its Automated Message Handling System (AMHS) service was granted an additional five years and $15.6 million contract by the Defense Information Systems Agency (DISA).

On 20 May 2020, Telos named retired general Keith B. Alexander as its advisory board's inaugural leader.

In November 2020, the company filed for an initial public offering.
