= Automated Message Handling System =

The Automated Message Handling System (AMHS) is an automated message handling system that can be used to process, store, and disseminate legacy AUTODIN messages as well as Defense Message System (DMS) messages. The term "Automated Message Handling System" or "AMHS" has not been trademarked by a vendor, but is instead a product category that includes several systems and products created by government agencies, integrators and software companies. Examples include:

- Telos Corporation has an AMHS product named Automated Message Handling System (AMHS) that was developed for the Defense Information Systems Agency.
- The National Security Agency terms its own in-house developed message handling system AMHS.
- The Defense Intelligence Agency and National Geospatial-Intelligence Agency both called their internal message traffic systems AMHS and it is referred to as AMHS by Jane's Military Communications. DIA and NGA both use a blend of the Northrop Grumman MISTIC and the Boeing Multimedia Message Manager.
- Boldon James classifies its SAFEMail product both a Military Message Handling System and an AMHS - it is built to work alongside Microsoft Exchange Server.
- Isode has a set of X.400 products that it classifies as both a Military Message Handling System (MMHS) and an Aviation Message Handling System (AMHS).

Telos Corporation's AMHS product was selected by all services as the message handling system to be used for organizational messaging throughout the United States Department of Defense. The Air Force completed transition to AMHS in November 2006. The Army has transitioned most of the CONUS organizations, the Coast Guard has completed the transition in 2008, the Navy has begun transitioning in May 2007, and the USMC selected the AMHS and began transitioning in November 2007. In addition to the DoD organizations, other federal agencies (including the DEA and FAA) also use the AMHS. The benefits of using AMHS over older versions of DMS is that it consolidates and reduces the number of Fortezza cards that contain X.509 certificates for each recipient. AMHS can also use the Virtual Fortezza Cards, or VFC's, stored on a Type 2 Cryptographic Support Server board, or T2CSS. The T2CSS is located within the actual AMHS server, reducing the inconvenience placed upon the user to keep track of a Fortezza card.
