= GIS Arta =

Military software

GIS Arta or GIS Art for Artillery is military software used to coordinate artillery strikes. It has been used in the 2022 Russian invasion of Ukraine by the Armed Forces of Ukraine. It has fast targeting (one minute), it does not require reconnaissance units to use specialized devices (they use smartphones), and it does not require artillery pieces to be clustered together. It has been compared to the German artillery software ESG Adler. It was developed by Ukrainian programmers, with involvement by British digital map companies.

== See also ==
- Delta (situational awareness system)
