= Reserve+ =

Ukrainian mobile application

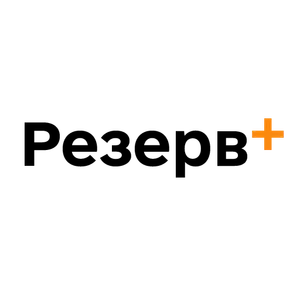
- Developer: Ministry of Defence of Ukraine
- Release: May 18, 2024
- Stable release: 2.3.3 / July 30, 2026
- Available in: Ukrainian
- Type: Mobile application
- License: Proprietary
- Website: reserveplus.mod.gov.ua

Reserve+ (Ukrainian: Резерв+, lit. Reserve Plus) is a Ukrainian mobile application developed by the Ministry of Defence of Ukraine, released on 18 May 2024 for Android and iOS.

The application allows conscripts, reservists, and persons liable for military service to update their registration data and obtain an electronic military registration document. Users can also apply for deferments, request referrals to Military Medical Commissions, register for military service for the first time, and browse vacancies within the Armed Forces of Ukraine.

== Background ==
The Reserve+ application provides a digital account through which conscripts, reservists, and other persons liable for military service can access electronic public services related to national security and defence.

Reserve+ was developed as part of Ukraine's broader military digitisation effort, which accelerated significantly following Russia’s full-scale invasion on 24 February 2022. The application was developed alongside Army+, a parallel service for active-duty service members, both overseen by the Ministry of Defence's digital transformation team, which was led by Deputy Minister Kateryna Chernohorenko during the initial development of the project.

The application provides the following features and services:

- updating registration data;
- accessing personal information contained in Oberih — the Unified State Register of Conscripts, Military Reservists, and Persons Subject to Military Service (Oberih Register);
- generation of military registration documents;
- generation of digital referrals to a Military Medical Commission of Ukraine;
- registering for military service;
- applying for and receiving deferment from conscription during mobilisation.

The application received certification under Ukraine's Comprehensive Information Protection System (CIPS). Authentication is carried out via the BankID system. To update their data, users must provide a phone number, an email address (optional), and a residential address.

Initially, the application was not referenced in any publicly available legal acts. Representatives of the Ministry of Defence of Ukraine stated that the application was regulated by a classified Cabinet of Ministers resolution. In August 2025, a Cabinet of Ministers resolution formally defined the operational framework for both the Army+ and Reserve+ applications.

As of December 2025, the application has over 6 million users.

== History ==
=== 2024 ===
On 18 May 2024, a Law of Ukraine came into force requiring Ukrainian citizens subject to military service to update their registration data — including phone number, email address, and residential address — within 60 days, by 16 July 2024. To enable compliance, the Reserve+ mobile application was developed and launched, serving as a digital personal account for persons liable for military service. The development of the application was financed by a charitable foundation and cost 3.4 million hryvnias.

On 18 June 2024, a digital military registration document was launched in the application, carrying the same legal force as its paper equivalent. The document includes a QR code that enables authorised authorities (including Territorial Recruitment and Social Support Centres and police) to verify a user's military registration status instantly, removing the need to carry a paper military ID.

In August 2024, it was reported that Russia had launched a counterfeit version of the Reserve+ application in order to collect personal data from Ukrainian citizens.

In late September 2024, Deputy Minister of Defence for Digital Development Kateryna Chernohorenko announced at the IT Arena conference in Lviv that a recruitment feature would be added to Reserve+ in October, enabling users to browse open positions in military units and select where they wished to serve. Chernohorenko stated that the aim was to transform Reserve+ into a broader digital service platform for persons subject to military service. The service was launched in October 2024, offering over 4,000 open positions in partnership with the Lobby X employment platform.

On 9 November 2024, the application launched an online deferment service for persons with disabilities, as well as university students, postgraduate students, and doctoral candidates. To apply for a deferment online, users submit a request in Reserve+; the system automatically verifies eligibility against state registers. If approved, the deferment status is reflected in the user’s electronic military document. The service was developed and launched in collaboration with the Ministry of Education and Science, Ministry of Social Policy, Ministry of Justice, and Pension Fund, as well as EU support under the DT4UA project implemented by the e-Governance Academy (Estonia) and the Better Regulation Delivery Office (BRDO).

=== 2025 ===
On 31 January 2025, the application added a capability for generating digital referrals to a Military Medical Commission of Ukraine, eliminating the need to visit a recruitment office in person to obtain a paper referral.

On 7 February 2025, the application implemented automatic renewal of deferments from mobilisation for persons with disabilities and students. Automatic renewal applies to persons whose disability status is confirmed by the Pension Fund of Ukraine, as well as to university students, postgraduate students, and doctoral candidates.

On 18 April 2025, version 1.6.0 was released, enabling:

- a service to obtain expanded data from the Oberih Register. The expanded data is generated as a PDF document that can be saved to the user’s device.
- push notifications for changes to a user's data in the Oberih Register — including alerts about inclusion in or removal from the wanted list — as well as an option to generate a PDF document containing expanded personal data from the Oberih Register.

Deputy Minister Chernohorenko stated that the update was aimed at helping users “stay informed about what data is recorded” and resolve issues without having to visit a recruitment office in person.

On 6 May 2025, version 1.6.1 was released, automatically extending deferments for several categories of persons, including those who had previously obtained deferments online. The application's security certificates were also updated in this version.

On 10 July 2025, version 1.7.1 was released, adding the ability to pay fines for failure to update registration data by the 16 July 2024 deadline. The ability to pay fines for other military registration violations is expected to be added in later versions.

In September 2025, a new VOS-999 badge was launched in the electronic military document within the app. The badge indicates that the holder has not yet undergone basic general military training. According to the Ministry of Defence, the mark carries no penalties and requires no action from users; it serves as a planning tool to help the state assess training needs ahead of potential mobilisation.

=== 2026 ===
On 28 January 2026, the Reserve+ app rolled out the ability to register for military service for the first time entirely online, without visiting a Territorial Recruitment and Social Support Centre or undergoing a medical examination. The service is available to men aged 25 to 59 who have not previously registered and hold biometric documents.

On 3 March 2026, a new type of deferment for parents of large families was added to Reserve+. Eligibility criteria are as follows:

- persons subject to military service who have three or more children under the age of 18, all born in Ukraine, including children born within one or different marriages or outside of marriage;
- persons who are not in arrears on child support payments, or whose arrears do not exceed three months of payments;
- persons whose data — full name, date of birth, and individual tax number — is correctly recorded in state registers.

On 9 March 2026, version 2.0.0 added an electronic queue service for Territorial Recruitment and Social Support Centre appointments. This feature had previously been available only through the Ministry of Defence website.

== Reception ==
The Kyiv Independent described Reserve+ as a key element of Ukraine’s broader campaign to digitalise its military, aiming to streamline mobilisation, combat corruption, and replace Soviet-era bureaucratic practices. The publication noted that within two months of launch, 3 million military-aged people had used the app to update their contact information. Deputy Minister of Defence Kateryna Chernohorenko described the pace of adoption as “incredibly high” and said the app was “laying the foundation for the new way Ukraine will manage its army in the future.”

The application’s international reach was noted by the Ministry of Defence, which reported in mid-2024 that users from 124 countries had updated their data through Reserve+, with Poland, Germany, Canada, the United States, and the Czech Republic recording the highest usage among Ukrainians abroad.

In 2025 the Ministry of Defence reported that Reserve+ had reduced the administrative burden on recruitment offices and increased transparency in mobilisation management, noting that the app had processed over 150,000 deferments. According to the Ministry of Defence, the application contributed to a transition from paper-based to digital military administration.

== See also ==
- Ministry of Defence of Ukraine
- Army+
- Mobilization in Ukraine
