= Battlefield management system =

Military software type

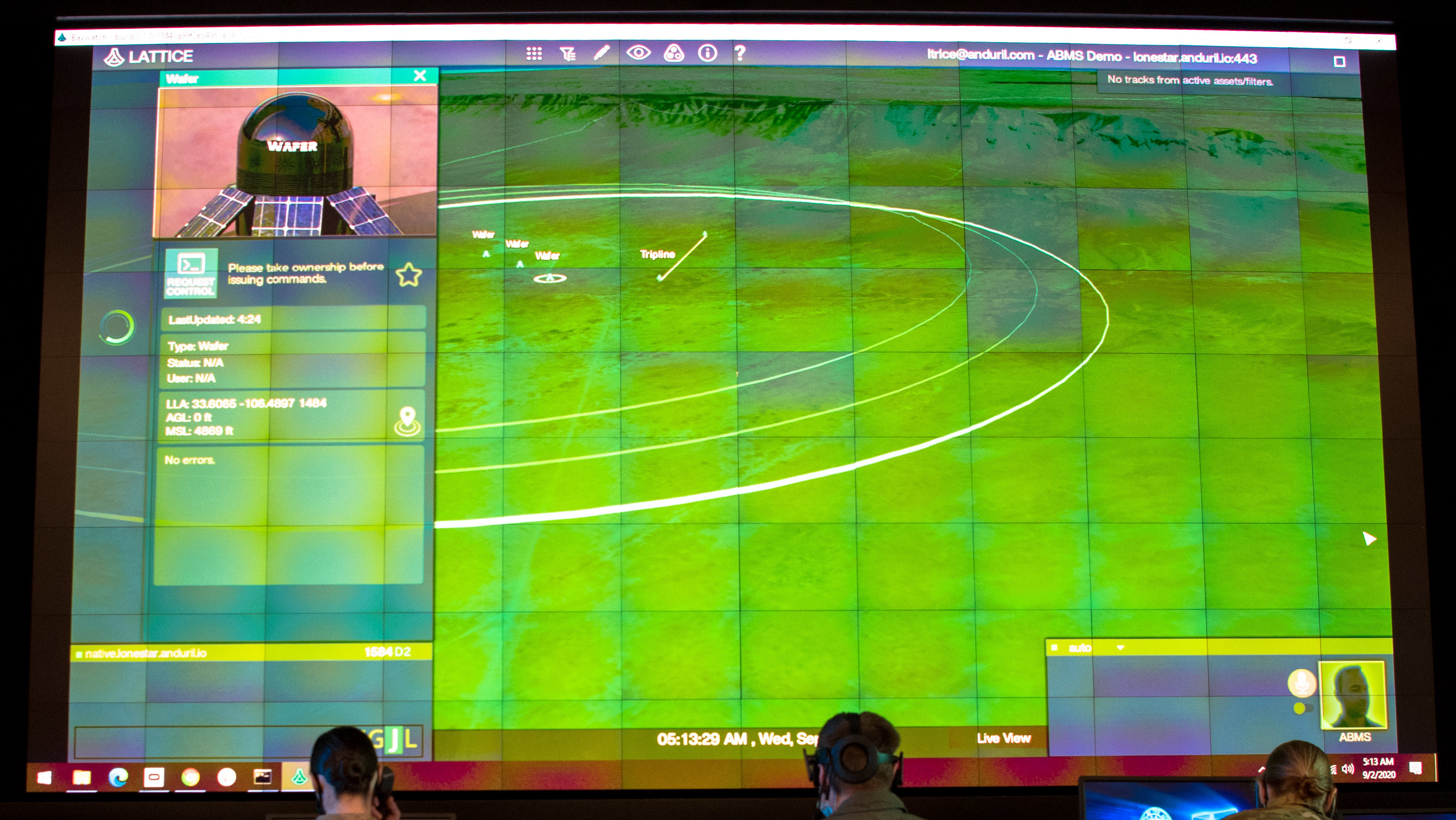
Anduril Industries (Joint Base Andrews) Lattice at a 2020 field test of the Advanced Battle Management System

A battlefield management system (BMS) is a system meant to integrate information acquisition and processing to enhance command and control of a military unit through multiple other C4ISR (Command, Control, Communications, Computers, Intelligence, Surveillance and Reconnaissance) solutions to give commanding officers, NCOs or individual vehicles better situational awareness to friendly units around them and prevent "blue on blue" incidents, provide better situational awareness to OPFOR units seen by friendly units, speed relaying of orders and thus accelerate combat operations and maneuvers, facilitating fire support orders as an enemy can be marked by a squad leader on his terminals map and then have the location relayed directly to artillery, CAS or other fire support.

Systematic SitaWare C4ISR (Command, Control, Communications, Computers, Intelligence, Surveillance and Reconnaissance) is a large scale battlefield management system used by the United States, Germany, Latvia, Denmark, Sweden, Finland, Australia, Switzerland, New Zealand, Ireland, Slovenia and the United Kingdom.

== France ==
The French Army is using SICS (Système d'Information du Combat de SCORPION), a battlefield management system developed by the Eviden division of Atos.. SICS is also used by the land forces of Belgium and Luxembourg..

== Italy ==
BMS made by Leonardo

== Israel ==
WIN BMS made by Elbit Systems

== Pakistan ==
The Pakistan Army has been using an integrated battlefield management system called PAK-IBMS (Rehbar).

== Portugal ==
The Portuguese Army it's currently using an BMS called Eye Comand, developed by Critical Software.

== India ==
The Indian Army was developing its first BMS, with estimated completion in 2025. However, recent developments indicate foreclosure of this project.

== Sweden ==
9Land BMS Made by SAAB

== Ukraine ==
See Delta.
