= Automatic Digital Network =

US military data communications service

The Automatic Digital Network System, known as AUTODIN, is a legacy data communications service in the United States Department of Defense. AUTODIN originally consisted of numerous AUTODIN Switching Centers (ASCs) located in the United States and in countries such as England and Japan.

== Background ==
The design of the system, originally named "ComLogNet", began in 1958 by a team of Western Union, RCA and IBM. The customer was the U.S. Air Force and the system's purpose was to improve the speed and reliability of logistics traffic (spare parts for missiles) between five logistics centers and roughly 350 bases and contractor locations. An implementation contract was awarded in the fall of 1959 to Western Union as prime contractor and system integrator, RCA to build the 5 switching center computers and IBM for the compound terminals which provided for both IBM punched card and Teletype data entry. The first site became operational in 1962. During the implementation the government realized the broader value of the system and transferred it to the Defense Communications Agency (DCA) which renamed it "AUTODIN". In 1962 the government solicited competitive bids for a 9 center expansion which was won by Philco-Ford.

Deployment started in 1966. On March 22, 1968, Autodin multimedia terminal in Europe became operational at Ramstein Air base in Germany. This system linked more than 300 Air Forces bases, material areas, depots and other authorized agencies into a single communications network. In the ASCs; operational until the late 1980s the Philco-Ford OL9 computers were still in use with periodic technological updates. In the 1988 to 1990 timeframe an initiative by the Department of Defense for "off the shelf" hardware initiated a replacement of the Philco-Ford processors by DEC VAX 11/780 series systems.

In 1982, a follow-on project, AUTODIN II, was terminated in favor of using ARPANET technology for the Defense Data Network (including a military subnet known as MILNET).

AUTODIN Switching Centers have been replaced by various hardware/software combinations. The following are some examples:

- A program called NOVA to operate circuits and route messages. The system is designed to run at 2400 baud, however speeds up to 9600 baud are possible. The system is able to run down to 15 baud if communications systems require it.
- A series of hardware/software systems called DABS (DoDIIS Autodin Bypass System) which allows the transmission of messages over Serial connections at up to 9600 Baud as well as TCP/IP connections that allow the transmission of messages across Ethernet connects at speeds limited only by the network bandwidth.

In 1996, DoD decided to phase out AUTODIN by December 31, 1999. Early in the 21st century, all but one of the AUTODIN Switching Centers had been shut down. The intention is to transition secure messaging traffic to the Defense Message System.

== See also ==
- Defense Switched Network
- Defense Message System
- Western Union
- AUTOVON contemporaneous voice network
- STARCOM (communications system), U.S. Army Signal Corps predecessor, replaced by AUTODIN
