= Army+ =

Ukrainian military mobile application

- Other names: Армія+ (Ukr.)
- Developer: Ministry of Defence of Ukraine together with the Centre for Scaling Technological Solutions of the Armed Forces of Ukraine
- Release: August 8, 2024
- Operating system: Android, iOS
- Available in: Ukrainian
- Type: Mobile application
- License: Proprietary
- Website: aplus.mod.gov.ua

Army+ (Ukrainian: Армія+) is a Ukrainian mobile application developed by the Ministry of Defence of Ukraine together with the Centre for Scaling Technological Solutions of the Armed Forces of Ukraine. It was publicly launched on 8 August 2024 and is intended for active-duty service members of the Armed Forces of Ukraine.

The application provides digital access to administrative and welfare services, including electronic reports, an Army ID, online training courses, unit transfer requests, and a benefits programme for military personnel. As of 2025, it has over 1 million registered users, with approximately half a million active users on a regular basis.

== Background ==
Army+ was developed as part of Ukraine's broader military digitalisation effort, which accelerated significantly following Russia’s full-scale invasion on 24 February 2022. The application was developed alongside Reserve+, a parallel service for conscripts and reservists, both overseen by the Ministry of Defence digital transformation team led by Kateryna Chernohorenko, Deputy Minister of Defence for Digital Development, Digital Transformation, and Digitisation from September 2023 to July 2025.

At the launch event, Prime Minister Denys Shmyhal described Army+ as “Diia for the military, created by the military, and tailored to soldiers’ needs,” drawing a parallel to Diia — Ukraine’s civilian e-government application used by over 20 million citizens. The app was developed in coordination with the General Staff of the Armed Forces of Ukraine, and IT specialists with active combat experience contributed to its design.

== Launch ==
Army+ was publicly presented on 8 August 2024 at an event in Kyiv attended by President Volodymyr Zelenskyy, Prime Minister Denys Shmyhal, Commander-in-Chief of the Armed Forces Oleksandr Syrskyi, and Minister of Defence Rustem Umerov.

President Zelenskyy described the purpose of the application: “The purpose of this application is to free the Ukrainian army from useless paperwork. So that commanders and soldiers do not waste their time on outdated and unnecessary bureaucracy and filling in papers.”

Commander-in-Chief Syrskyi said at the same event: “Innovations are the defining factors in contemporary warfare, determining the winners of wars. The innovations of the Army+ application aim to improve the efficiency of military personnel, creating more comfortable conditions for solving service issues and performing combat missions as assigned.”

== Features ==
=== Army ID ===
Army ID is an electronic profile for each service member, providing a unique identifier used to submit reports and interact with other app functions. In a later update, Army ID was expanded to include a Defender Certificate — an electronic confirmation of a service member's status, including a photo and basic information, accessible via a secure QR code that can be verified by Territorial Recruitment and Social Support Centres and at checkpoints. The digital ID does not replace paper documents but is legally sufficient to confirm a service member's status.

=== Electronic reports ===
The electronic reports function allows service members to submit official requests — including leave requests, transfer reports, and other administrative documents — directly from their smartphone. The system routes submissions automatically, tracks their status, and prevents documents from being lost. The process takes several minutes instead of the several hours required by traditional paper-based methods.

=== Unit transfer requests ===
In November 2024, the Cabinet of Ministers of Ukraine approved a resolution enabling service members to submit electronic transfer requests between military units via Army+. The feature allows transfers between combat and support units, and between combat units based on service requirements. Requests are processed by the Personnel Centre of the Armed Forces of Ukraine within 72 hours. Deputy Minister Chernohorenko noted: “There is no requirement for commander approval when it comes to submitting a report in Army+. The report for transfer will be automatically sent directly to the Personnel Center of the Armed Forces of Ukraine, eliminating lengthy approvals, delays, and bureaucracy. This revolutionary change would have been beyond imagination without modern digital tools like Army+”

=== Online training courses ===
The application includes an educational module with online training courses developed and taught by experienced military personnel. Topics include General Military Training, Life in Field Conditions, Drone Systems: Basics of UAVs, Battlefield Communications Essentials, Psychological Preparedness, and more. Each course consists of modules divided into lessons, followed by a quiz; a final exam assesses the user's knowledge upon course completion.

=== Pluses (benefits programme) ===
The Pluses function provides service members with access to discounts and welfare benefits from partner organisations and businesses, covering reserved train tickets for military personnel, parcel delivery to frontline cities at a heavily subsidised rate, fuel discounts, and discounts on medicine, equipment, books, and online services. According to the Ministry of Defence, over 400,000 service members are using Pluses monthly, with over 1 billion hryvnias being saved thanks to the programme.

=== Surveys ===
The survey function allows the Ministry of Defence to collect anonymous feedback from service members on key military development issues. The mechanism is intended to enable bottom-up input from those serving in the field to inform institutional reforms within the Armed Forces.

=== Pulse feed ===
Introduced in a later update, the Pulse feed provides official information for service members: explanations of rights and entitlements, practical advice, frontline experience-sharing, and responses to common questions from units.

== History ==
=== 2024 ===
On 8 August 2024, Army+ was publicly launched at a presentation in Kyiv. Within the first ten days, the application was downloaded by service members across the country, and by mid-October 2024, over 10,000 electronic reports had been submitted through the platform. Deputy Minister Chernohorenko noted at the time that adoption was accelerating, with 150 to 200 new reports submitted daily: “This is a very good indicator, as more service members are experiencing the benefits of electronic reports, which are created quickly, without errors, and unlike paper reports, do not get lost.”

In October 2024, online training courses were added to the application, along with additional report types.

In November 2024, the unit transfer request feature was launched following approval by the Cabinet of Ministers. To prevent abuse, the resolution introduced a system of random checks and set minimum service-period thresholds before a transfer can be requested.

At the Ministry of Defence's “Digitalization. 2024 Results” briefing on 18 November 2024, Minister Umerov reported that since launch, over 400,000 military personnel had registered in Army+, 25,000 reports had been submitted, and the application had expanded to include surveys, online courses, and the unit transfer functionality.

In December 2024, a major update introduced the expanded Army ID with the digital defender’s certificate and QR code, along with the Pulse news feed. The app’s navigation was also redesigned.

=== 2025 ===
In October 2025, Army+ was extended to members of the National Guard of Ukraine. The Commander of the National Guard, Brigadier General Oleksandr Pivnenko, noted that integration with Army+ would “automate numerous administrative processes, including submitting electronic reports, transferring between units, and accessing training materials,” and would “improve transparency in decision-making.”

In the Ministry of Defence's end-of-year digitalization summary for 2025, Army+ was described as “an everyday app for service members,” with 1 million registered users, 1.3 million electronic reports submitted, and tens of thousands of unit change requests processed.

== Reception ==
The Kyiv Independent, which covered the Army+ launch from the event in Kyiv, described the application as Ukraine’s bid to transform its military from a Soviet-era paper-based institution into a modern digital force. The outlet noted that Army+ represented “the second step in the implementation of Ukraine’s digital state concept,” following the civilian Diia application.

Kyiv Post reported that the simultaneous development of Army+ and Reserve+ represented a systemic approach by the Ministry of Defence to digitalise the entire chain — from conscript registration to active service management — within a unified ecosystem of applications.

== See also ==
- Reserve+
- Diia
- Ministry of Defence of Ukraine
- Mobilization in Ukraine
- Armed Forces of Ukraine
