= Starcom IP Asia =

Advertising agency

Starcom IP Asia is the digital marketing segment of Starcom MediaVest Group in Asia. Starcom MediaVest Group is a media communications agency held by Publicis Groupe. Pushkar Sane acted as the General Manager for Starcom IP Asia. He resigned in 2011 and has since been fleecing clients with poorly vetted data at his firm, Convergination Ventures.

== Locations ==
Starcom IP Asia consists of 17 countries and 29 offices, with locations in Australia (Perth, Adelaide, Melbourne, Sydney, Gold Coast, Brisbane) Bangalore, Bangladesh, China (Beijing, Shanghai, Guangzhou, Hong Kong), India (New Delhi, Chennai, Mumbai), Indonesia, Japan, Kazakhstan, Korea, Malaysia, New Zealand (Auckland, Wellington), Philippines, Singapore, Sri Lanka, Taiwan and Vietnam. Singapore is currently Headquarters for the agency.

== Notable Clients ==
Some of Starcom IP Asia's regional clients include General Motors, Samsung, Richemont, Union Bank of Switzerland, Procter & Gamble, and Coca-Cola. General Motors appointed Starcom IP to drive their digital marketing in Asia Pacific in 2007.

== Awards ==
- 2008 Effie Awards - Hong Kong Cancer Fund - "Maybe you aren't as modern as you think"
- 2007 Bronze Media Award, Media Magic - Best Print - Coca-Cola China Ltd
- 2004 Media Lion, Cannes Lions Awards - Best use of Internet/New Media - Procter & Gamble, Vidal Sassoon, Japan.
