= Systematic Software Engineering =

Denmark-based, multinational software company

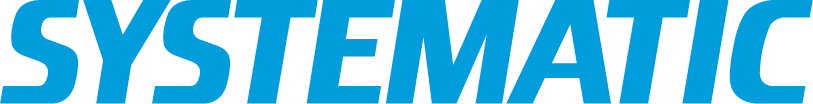
- Type: Private
- Industry: Defense and Healthcare
- Founded: August 19, 1985; 41 years ago
- Founder: Michael Holm
- Headquarters: Aarhus, Denmark
- Number of locations: 11 offices (2024) (2023)
- Key people: Nicolaj Bramsen (CEO); Michael Holm (Chairman)
- Products: Defence and Communications
- Revenue: €300 million (2024/2025)
- Operating income: €108 million (2024/2025)
- Net income: €86 million (2024/2025)
- Number of employees: 1,100 (2023)
- Website: systematic.com

Systematic is a multinational software company based in Aarhus, Denmark. It specialises in systems that support decision-making. Primarily, these have been command and control (C2) systems for commanders in armed forces.

By 2023, its battlefield management system was reported to be used by 45 nations. It enables interoperability between force elements, notably between allied forces. Other than the military of its home nation, Denmark, its systems have been adopted by the Australian Army, British Army, New Zealand Defence Force, United States Army and many European based NATO forces, such as the Slovenian Armed Forces, Swedish Armed Forces and the Bundeswehr.

Systematic's civilian applications extend to patient management, library data management and management of energy generation and delivery.

== History ==
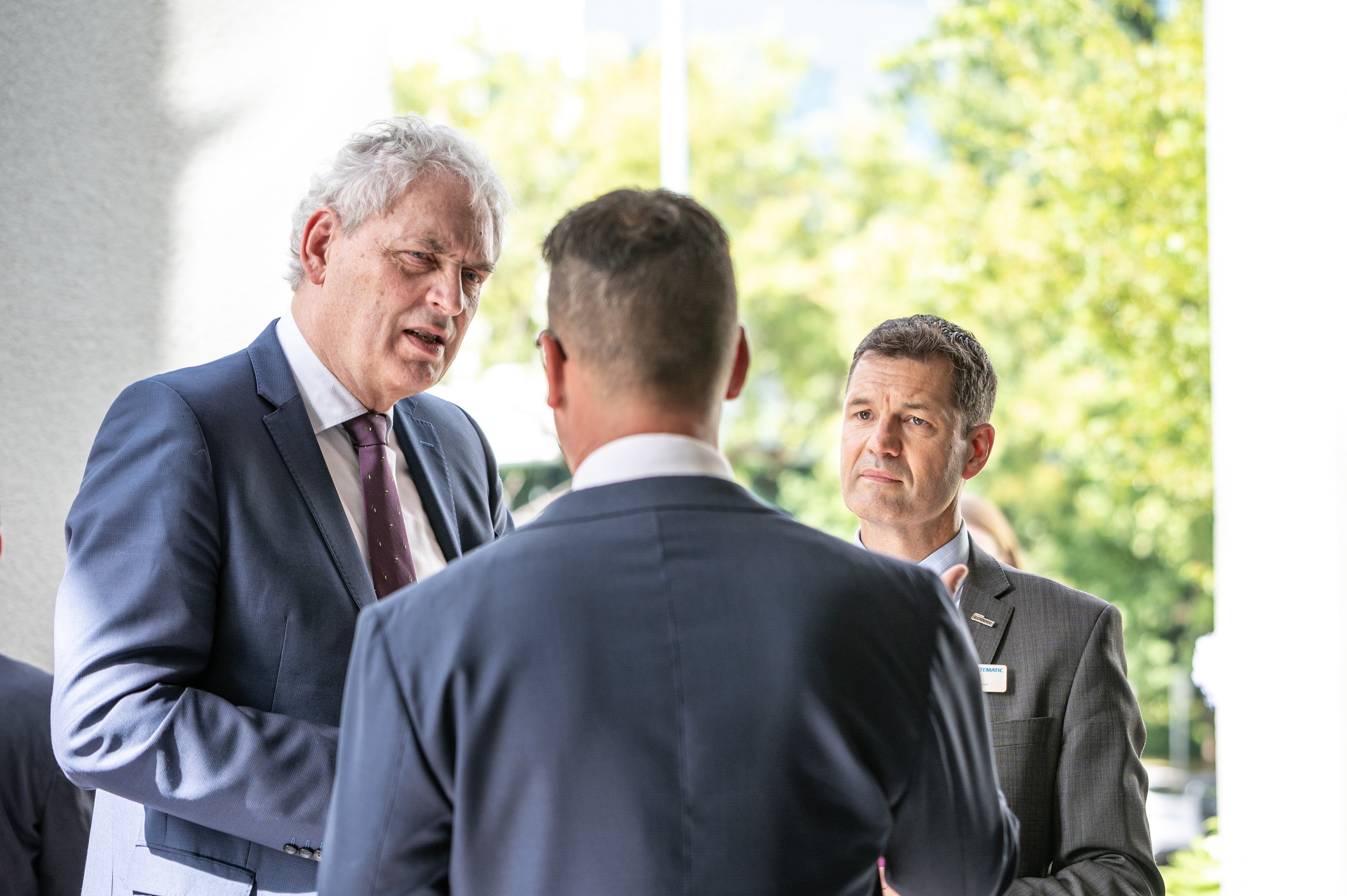
Co-founder, Michael Holm at left, with defence industry figures in Australia.

Michael Holm and Allan Schytt, two software engineers at the state-owned technology company, Datacentralen, met in 1985 and discussed a system for tracking the movement of warships on the Baltic Sea for Danish Fleet Command. They decided to incorporate a new company in Aarhus and develop the software.

The company was briefly known as Informatik and Oplysing, or Infop ApS, before settling on Systematic Software Engineering. Though later registered as Systematic A/S, it is more commonly known as Systematic.

=== 1980s-1990s: Message format innovation ===
After delivering the force tracking software for the Royal Danish Navy, the group developed a Variable Message Format communications platform, for use between NATO partners, known as IRIS. It is characterised by one defence analyst, Joseph J Molitoris, as a "comprehensive message handling and formatting system" that is "compliant with multiple USMTF and JVMF baselines."

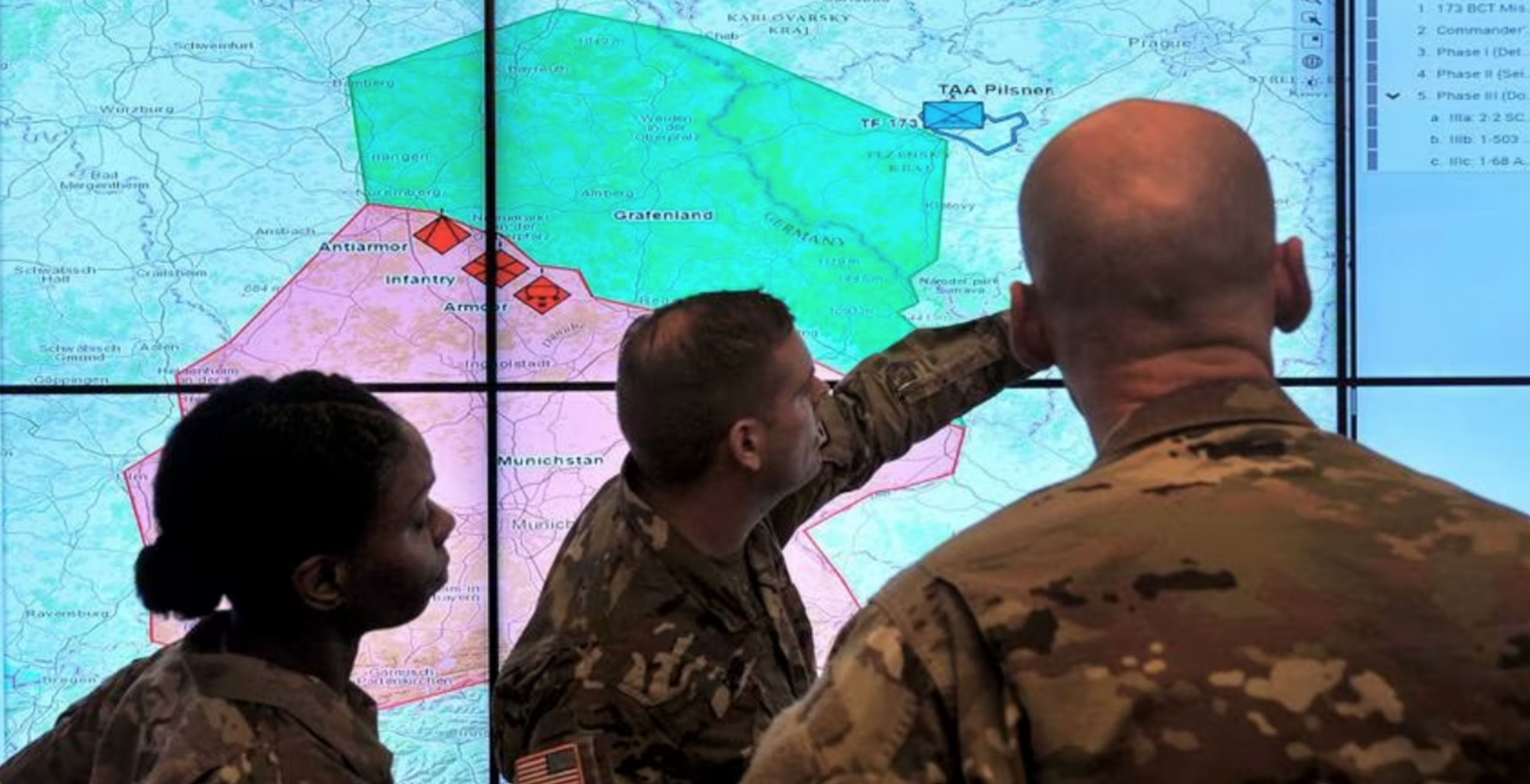
US Army Command Post Computing Environment, used at the Aberdeen Proving Ground, is an iteration of the battle management system.

=== 2000s: Battle management development ===
IRIS became the foundation software for more complex systems for battle management. By 2011 Systematic had iterated blue force tracking software, called SitaWare, which the Danish army began using on operations. Originally designed to provide situational awareness to commanders in the land domain, SitaWare generates a common operational picture that can be shared between operators in battle with partner forces. The first military force to use SitaWare was Denmark. It's understood that the first land force to adopt SitaWare, outside of Denmark, was the Slovenian Army.

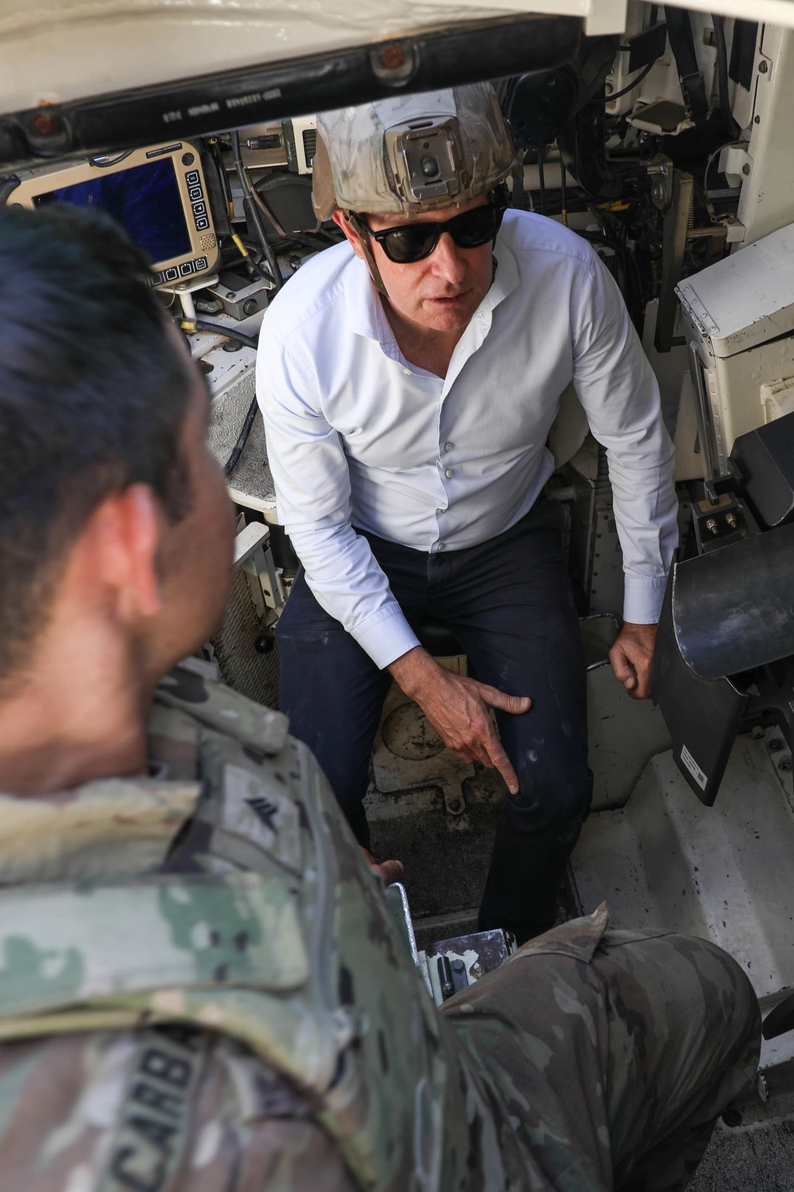
The system is integrated (at top left) in the M1A2 main battle tank used by Poland from 2023.

=== 2010s: Expansion and combat deployment ===
During the War in Afghanistan, several ISAF partners deployed SitaWare as their command and control system, such as the Danish Army, Slovenian Ground Force and Swedish Armed Forces. The Swedish army began training with SitaWare Headquarters and SitaWare WebCOP from 2010, then formed part of Regional Command North in Mazar-e Sharif, with 500 soldiers. Its force tracking capabilities may have prevented fratricide.

The 2014 Russian invasion of Crimea affected uptake of the system, particularly amongst US commanders, and it was chosen over Raytheon for their requirements. By 2017, the US Army Mission Command Center of Excellence had selected SitaWare Headquarters for its command, control, communications, computers, and intelligence (C4I) system.

=== 2020s: Diversification and transition ===
Systematic moved to be a supplier of software systems for the health sector and large data projects, as well as defence.The first iteration of the software for hospitals, Columna Flow, was used for Electronic Health Record management, in the small central region of Denmark in 2011–13. Its first national project was the deployment of software to manage and track infection and testing during the COVID-19 pandemic. Systematic has built data management platforms for Danish Police, for Danish intelligence services as well as its libraries and educational institutions.

While the company has attempted to move to a broader product offering, the military side has continued. By 2023, there were 45 nations using the SitaWare platform at some level of command. The company's 2022 annual report states they have a million warfighters using one of their software solutions. In 2023, a change of senior leadership was shared with the business community, with Holm transitioning from being CEO and Chairman, to Chairman alone, in that year.

== Software platforms ==
Systematic software products are designed for three sectors, defence, healthcare and digital transformation. The development process for each suite of software follows CMMI5 standards, for which they have received certification. As of 2023, its core products are as follows.

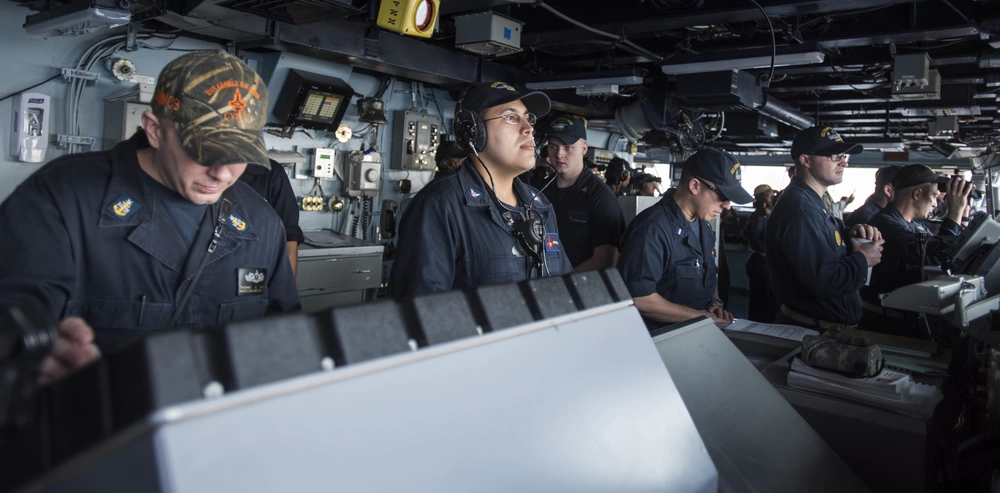
The bridge of USS George H.W. Bush, where the message handling system is used.

=== IRIS Suite ===
The IRIS Suite is a Military Message Handling System. As commercial off-the-shelf software, using NATO command and control standards, it integrates with the systems of allied users. Its structured message format can assist with the simplification of orders, reports, and messaging. IRIS Forms and IRIS WebForms comply with NATO Interoperability Standards including NATO ADatP-3/APP11, OTH-T GOLD, United States Military Standard and Australian Standard Military Text Format.

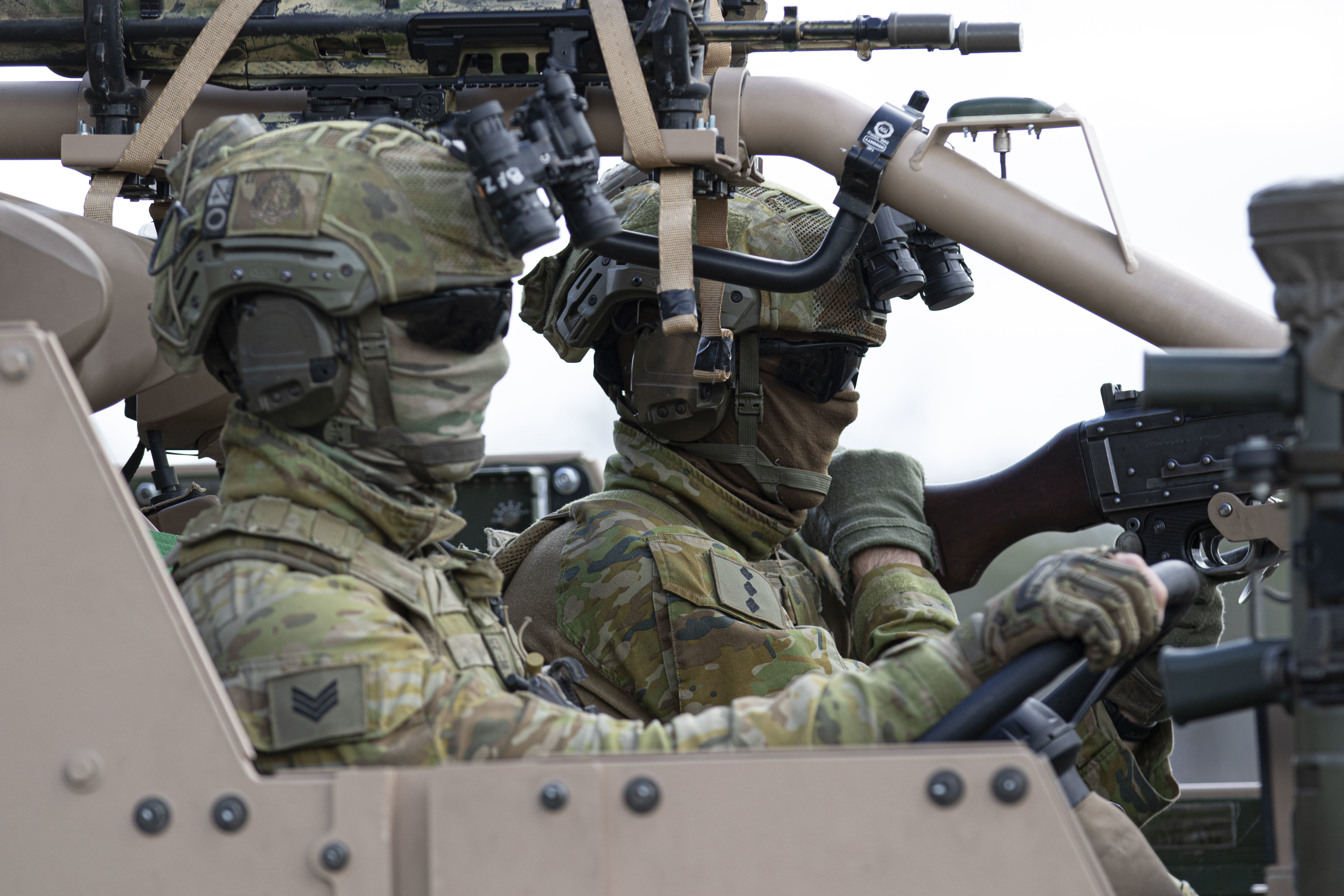
Australian soldiers on exercise at Talisman Sabre 2019, where the software was deployed.

=== SitaWare Suite ===
SitaWare Suite provides C2 for static and deployed command. It envelops SitaWare Headquarters, SitaWare Frontline, and SitaWare Edge. It provides C2 at command-post, command vehicle or at the combat lines. It is used to track friendly forces, to provide situational awareness, to connect force elements and to share battleground information with the command chain and allies. The Suite is used by several NATO partners, including its newer members. In 2023, the Finnish Defence Forces (FDF) disclosed its plans to use the entire SitaWare suite for the Finnish Army.

=== SitaWare Headquarters ===
SitaWare Headquarters connect echelons, such as a national command centre to the individual soldier. It aggregates large volumes of data, from military and civilian sources, to generate a common operational picture for land, maritime, air and joint operations. The software supports staff in planning and executing operations with tools for C2, for operational planning while providing situational awareness. Australian and American commanders used the system in Exercise Talisman Sabre 2019. In 2020, the British Army 3rd Division - took SitaWare Headquarters into service, for situational awareness and command and control, at the battalion level and above. It is reported that the system's ability to create interoperability with allied forces was a key reason for adoption by the Lithuanian Armed Forces and the Australian Defence Force.

=== SitaWare Frontline ===
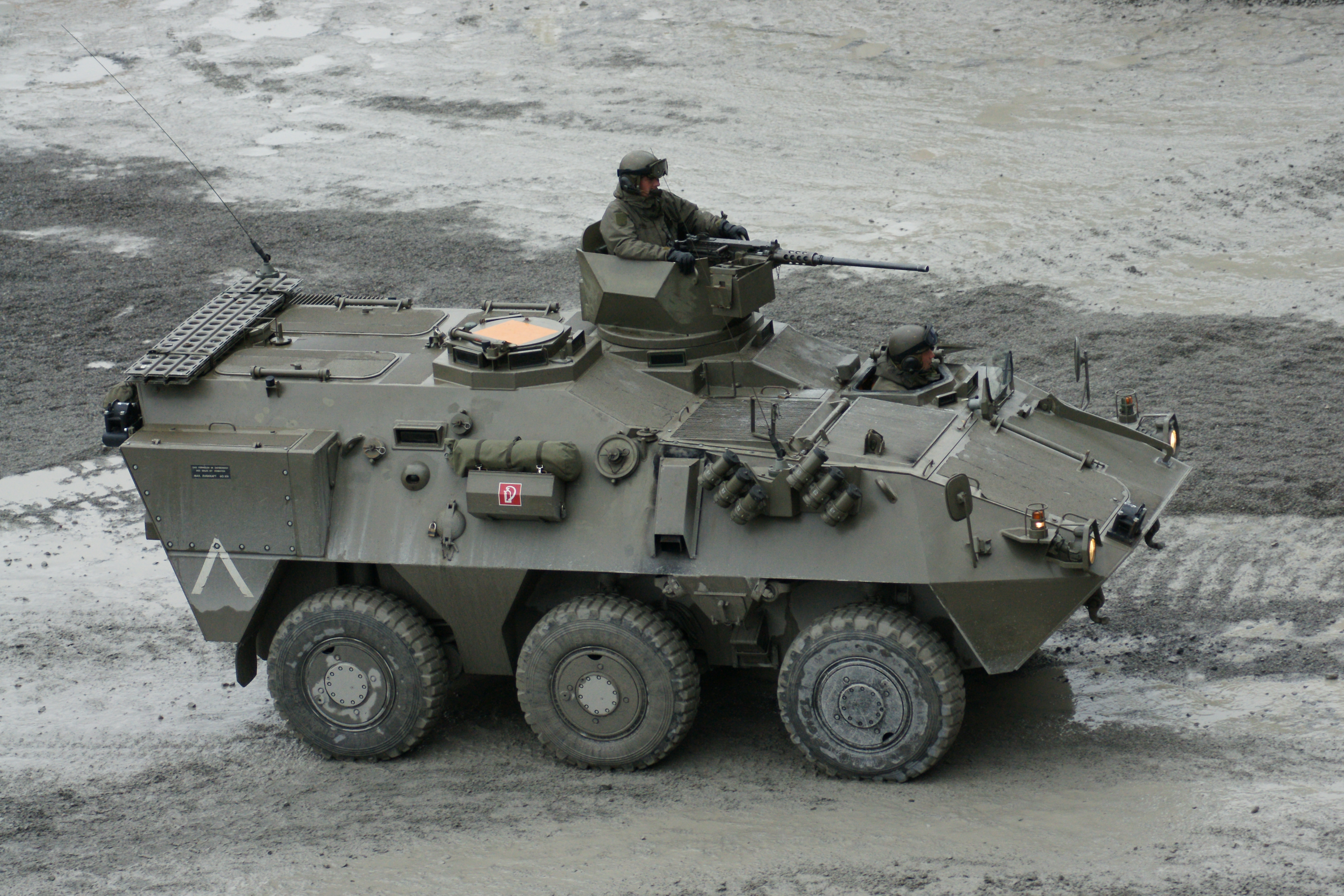
The Pandur used by Slovenian Armed Forces is equipped with the Frontline iteration.

SitaWare Frontline is a mission planning system designed for use in command vehicles. The system can issue orders from an electronic map; communicated via tactical radio networks – both IP and non-IP. Since 2021 it has included force tracking, geospatial tools, and cursor on-target messages. It may display two video feeds from external sensors and subsystems. It can include a Fire support module (known as Thor in the Danish forces). The system is used by Very High Readiness Joint Task Force elements within NATO. In 2023, the Australian Defence Force has issued a statement that they had down selected SitaWare Headquarters and SitaWare Frontline, to be deployed in the Army's Bushmaster Protected Mobility Vehicle and Hawkei and Mercedes-Benz G-Wagons.

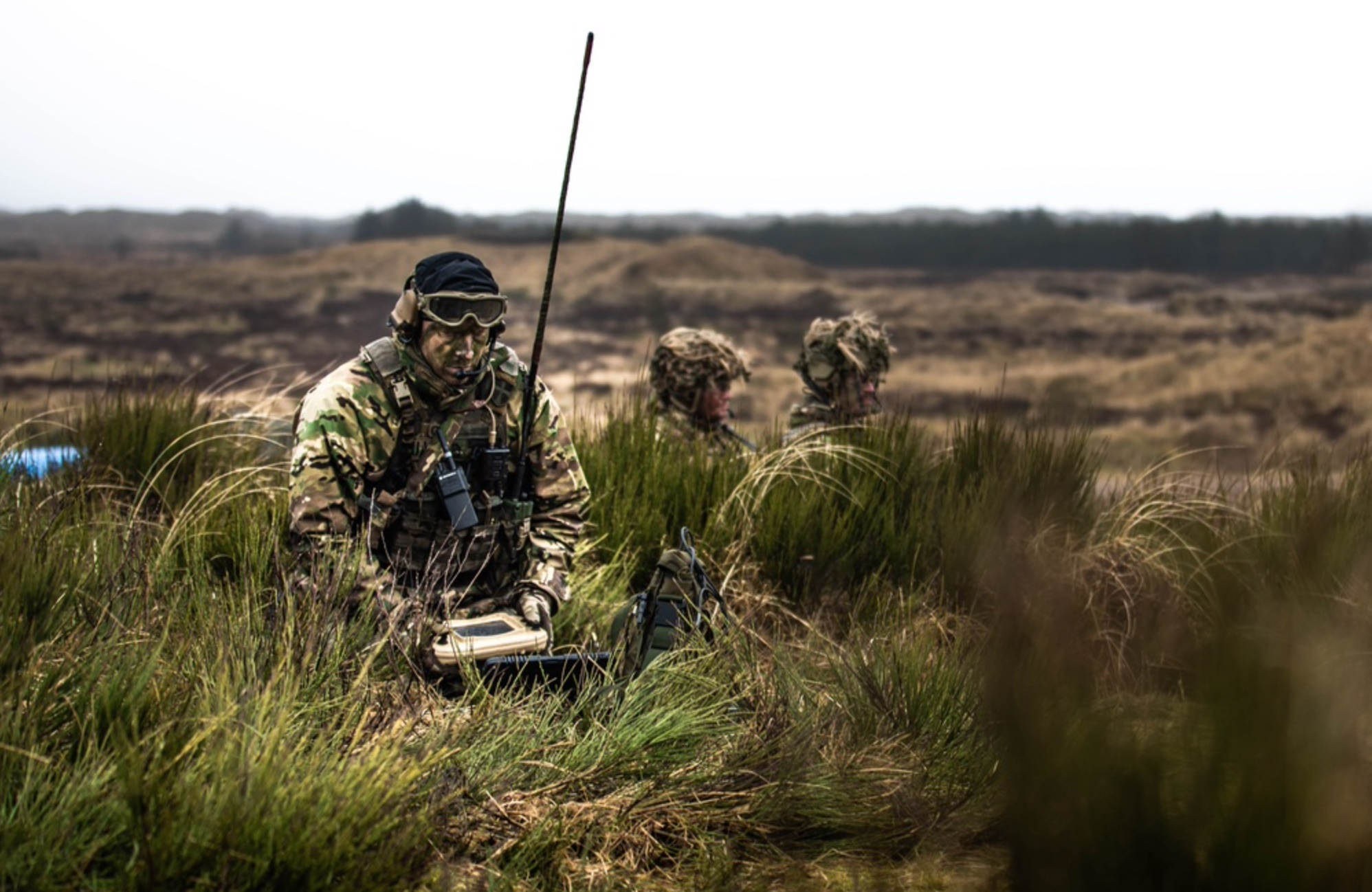
Danish soldier using C2 in live-fire exercise Dynamic Front held at Oksbøl Denmark 30 March 2023

=== SitaWare Edge ===
SitaWare Edge is designed for Android devices, used by dismounted soldiers, at the line of contact. The software adjusts to fit the screen of any such device to give 2D or 3D maps. It has a simplified planning feature and an integrated chat function.

=== SitaWare Insight ===
SitaWare Insight supports intelligence handlers and commanders. It uses artificial intelligence systems to process large volumes of data from open source documents to video of enemy defence assets. From 2023 the platform will use the feed of defence intelligence from Janes Information Services. It is reported that the system is now being used by Swiss Armed Forces.

=== SitaWare Maritime ===
SitaWare Maritime generates a Recognised Maritime Picture (RMP). It ingests data from sea domain information channels, such as AIS, OTH-Gold, and Link 16. It can be used by national headquarters, surface commanders, individual ships, boarding teams, RHIBs, and mobile coastal units. SitaWare Maritime was initially developed for the Royal Danish Navy, but was also adopted by the German Navy.

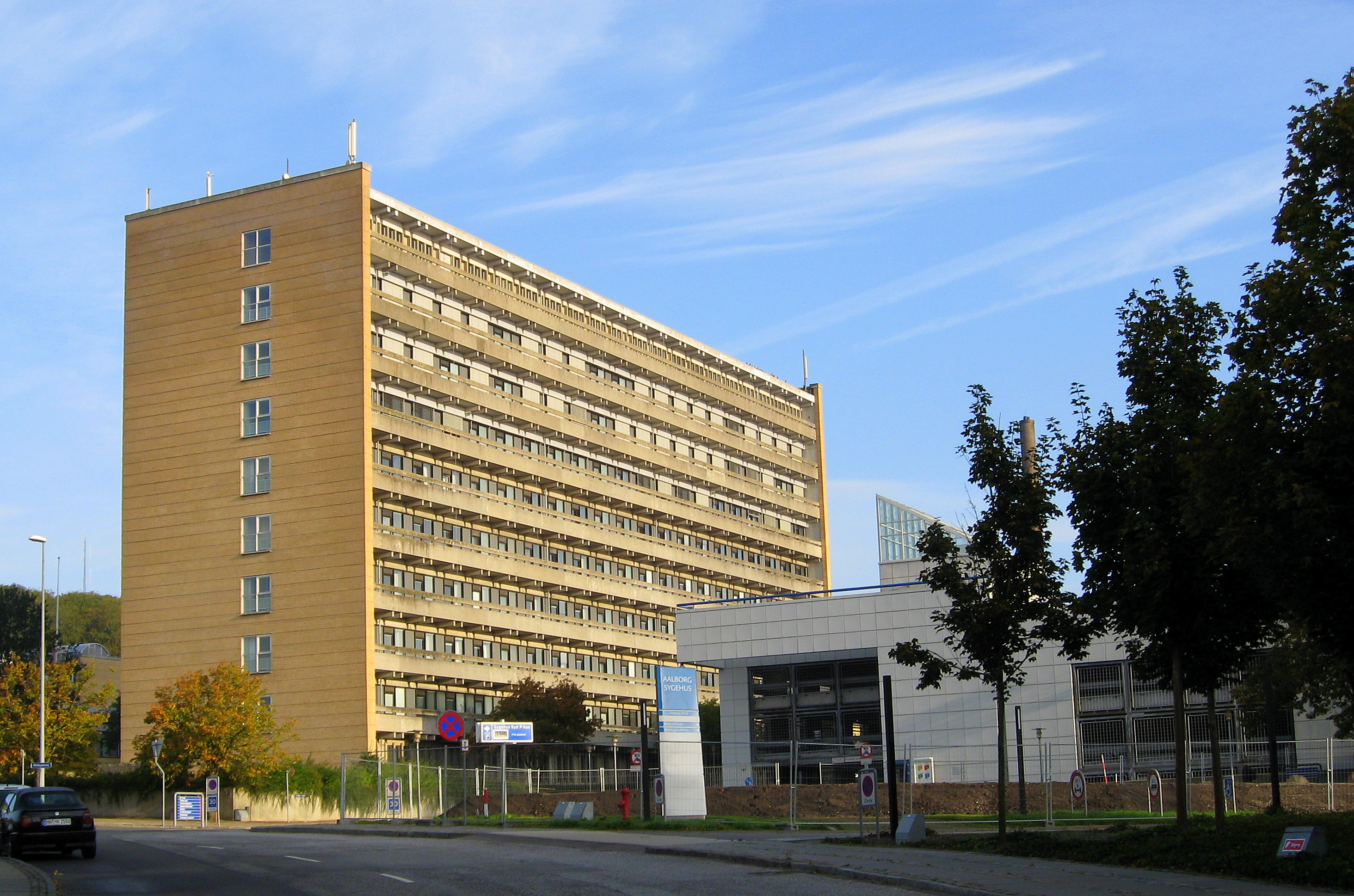
Aalborg University Hospital has been a user of Columna Flow

=== Columna Flow and Columna Clinical Information System ===
This software supports hospital administrators with patient management, resource allocation and logistics processes. The system allows health providers, and the patients themselves, to access medical history. One University of Georgia study found the system had reduced administrative costs, allowed patients to return home earlier, and resulted in "a cost benefit of 1.6." As of 2023 it was being used in Denmark, parts of Britain's National Health Service and University Medical Center Utrecht. According to the head of Healthcare Denmark, Systematic is largest provider of digital health solutions in Scandinavia.

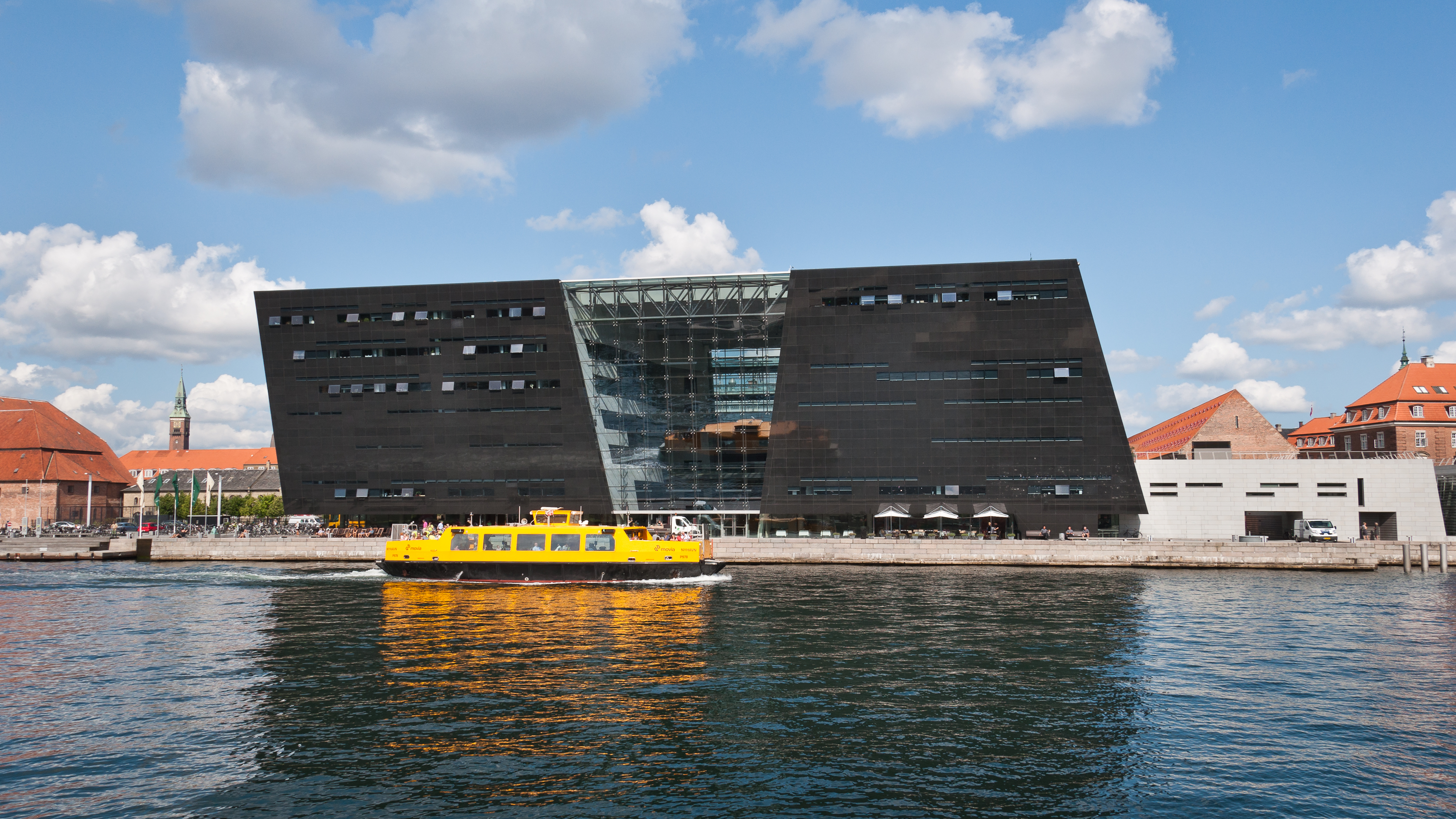
Royal Danish Library is one of the facilities linked by the Cicero system.

=== Cicero ===
This library management software can serve as the system of systems to local libraries. Since 2018, the platform has been used to automate many tasks in the Danish Joint Library System, that provides overall management to the systems of 2,428 library facilities which, in turn, manage 62 million library items.

== Company organisation ==
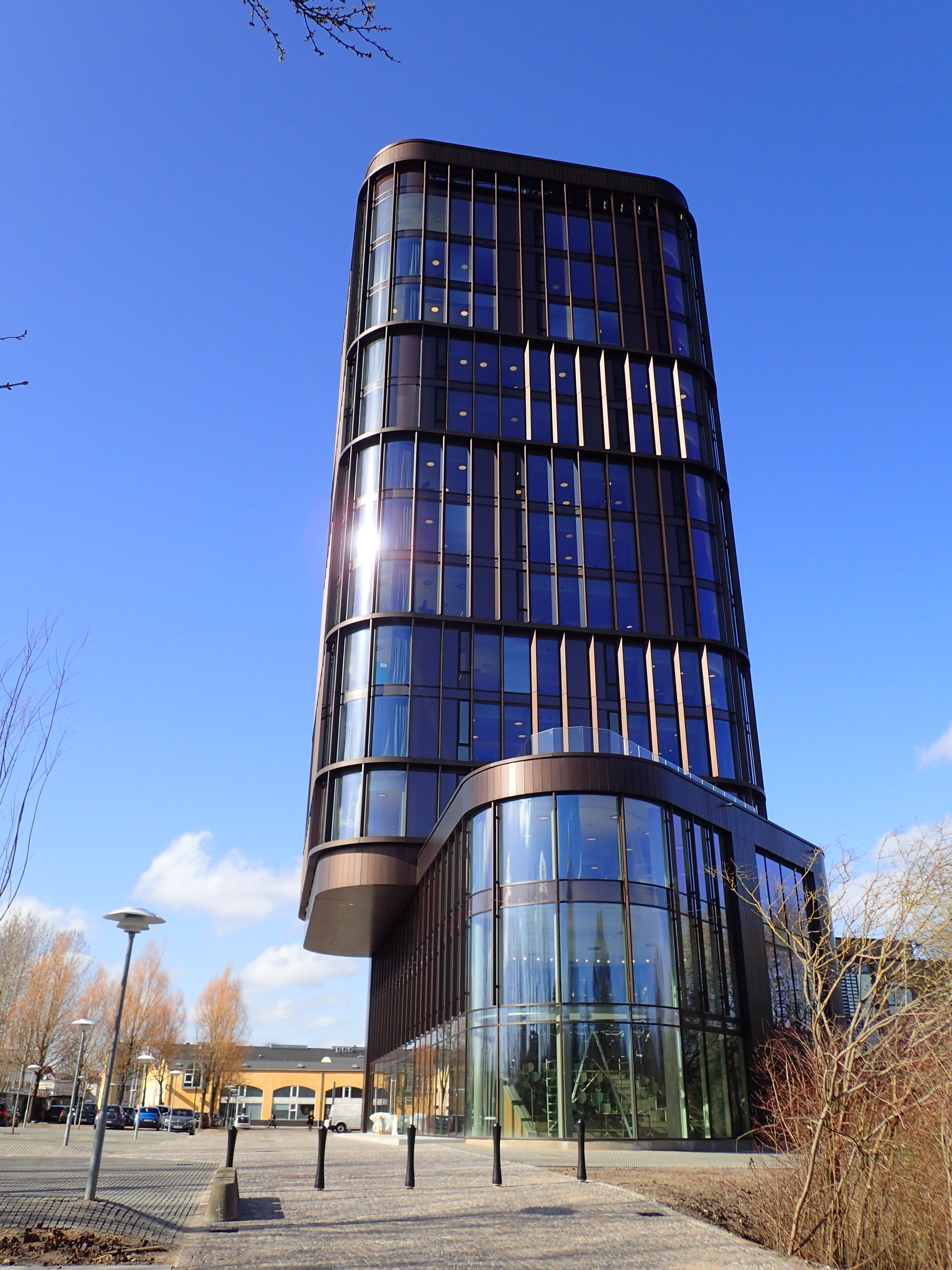
The Global HQ for Systematic in Aarhus.

Allan Schytt sold his share in the company to the company's co-founder, Michael Holm, in 1992. Holm brought in new equity partners, Alex Holm Jensen and Erik Bank Lauridsen but maintained a controlling stake through his private holding company, Systematic ApS, said to be valued at DKK 600 million, making him the majority stakeholder, chairman of the board, and CEO.

In October 2023, after 38 years with the group, Holm released his plan to retire as CEO. Nicolaj Bramsen, would take up that role on 14 December of that year, having served as the Group Senior Vice President for People & Culture; with Holm remaining as chairman of the board.

By 2010, Systematic employed 500 staff, by 2021 it reached 1,100. Two office openings in Bucharest (a development centre, having purchased a local tech company, Consensia) and Canberra (for its Asia-Pacific operations) took its presence to 11 sites, as follows:

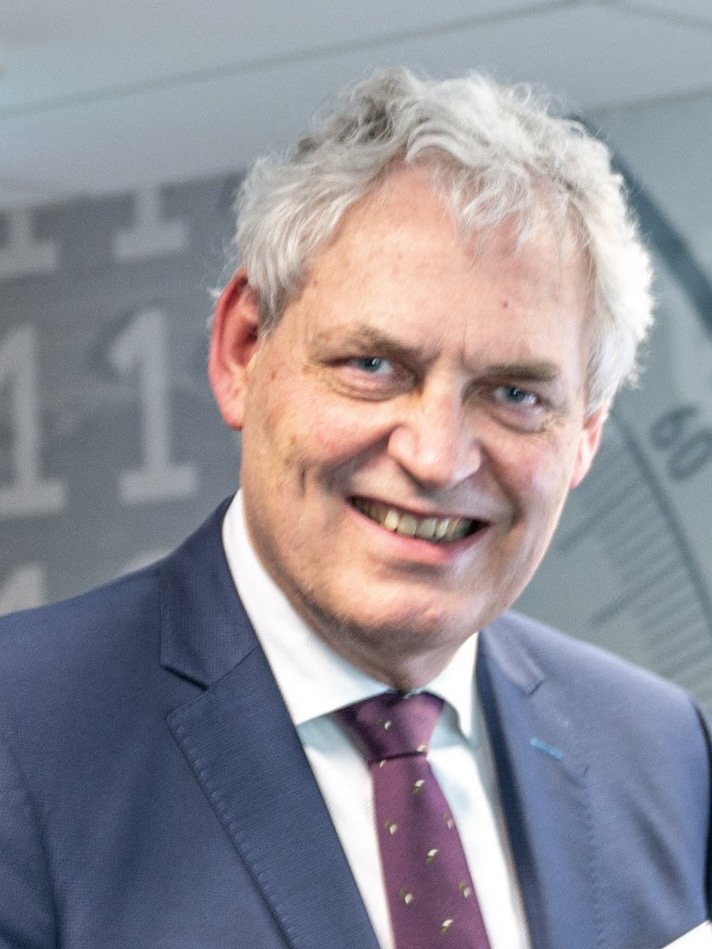
- Michael Holm, a co-founder, is of 2024 the chair of Systematic.
  Aarhus, Denmark, the global headquarters.
- Abu Dhabi, United Arab Emirates
- Bucharest, Romania,
- Canberra, ACT, Australia
- Centreville, VA, United States
- Copenhagen, Denmark, a centre for developers.
- Farnborough, United Kingdom
- Köln, Germany
- Stockholm, Sweden
- Tampere, Finland
- Wellington, New Zealand

While remaining in private hands, the company makes its annual reports public, and is known to have a turnover of DKK 965 million in 2021. By late 2023, the company was reported to be on track to record an annual turnover of DKK 1.4 billion.

Regarding the future ownership of the group, Holm was reported to have said in 2023, "we are not going to sell. The most realistic thing is that we establish a fund that will own Systematic in the future."
