= Defense Message System =

US secure electronic mail system

The Defense Message System or Defense Messaging System (DMS) is a deployment of secure electronic mail and directory services in the United States Department of Defense. DMS was intended to replace the AUTODIN network, and is based on implementations of the OSI X.400 mail, X.500 directory and X.509 public key certificates, with several extensions to meet the specific needs of military messaging.

DMS is sometimes operated in conjunction with third-party products, such as the Navy's DMDS (Defense Message Dissemination System), a profiling system that takes a message and forwards it, based on message criteria, to parties that are required to take action on a message. This combination has met with success with the upper echelons of command, since parties do not have to wait for messaging center operators to route the messages to the proper channels for action. The Navy also uses Navy Regional Enterprise Messaging System (NREMS). NREMS uses an AMHS backend to send secure Organizational Messages via a web interface to Naval commands.

The US Army's version of DMS is run solely on an AMHS platform both for CONUS (Contiguous United States or "Lower 48") and OCONUS (outside contiguous United States) operations. The Pentagon Telecommunications Center (PTC) is the hub for CONUS operations and there are several AMHS sites OCONUS for strategic messaging. In the tactical environment the Army deploys an independent Tactical Message Systems (TMS) that is also built on an AMHS platform for secure messaging capability in austere environments when communications with OCONUS AMHS sites are unavailable.

DMS has been coordinated by the Defense Information Systems Agency (DISA), and testing began in 1995. DMS has many third-party vendor products, such as DMDS, DMDS Proxy MR, CP-XP (the CommPower XML Portal), AMHS (Automated Message Handling System), MMHS, and CMS 1.0.

== See also ==
- Defense Switched Network
- GOSIP
