= STARCOM (communications system) =

US military data communications service

STARCOM, or the Strategic Army Communication System, was a communications network built and operated by the United States Army Signal Corps in the 1950s and 1960s. An early large-scale automated data network, the system provided central control of defense communications and data services within the continental United States and overseas. STARCOM was amalgamated into the Defense Communications Agency (DCA) in the early 1960s.

== Description ==
STARCOM operated three major nodes, with further links to radio transmitting and receiving stations overseas. West Coast Relay was situated at Davis, California, Midwest Relay at Fort Leavenworth, Kansas, and East Coast Relay at Fort Detrick, Maryland. The system had a capacity of 275,000 messages per day, and could handle 5,000 concurrent messages. The system used punched tape as a recording system, which was then printed to terminals for reading. East Coast Relay was the largest and last node to be completed, beginning operation in December, 1960. Uniquely, East Coast Relay was linked to its associated radio transmitter and receiver sites in Woodbridge, Virginia and La Plata, Maryland, respectively, by a tropospheric scatter system. The East Coast Relay facility cost $20 million in 1959 (equivalent to $211 million in 2023), of which slightly more than $2 million went toward buildings and site preparation..

== Links ==
West Coast Relay was primarily concerned with communications in the Pacific region, while East Coast Relay served Europe and the Caribbean. East Coast Relay was the primary control center, with redundancy built into the other two nodes. Additional secondary relay centers were established in Atlanta, New York, Chicago, Fort Sam Houston, Fort Bragg, Fort Lee, Camp Pickett, and Fort Meade. The Seattle station provided a link to the related Alaska Communications System node in Anchorage. Midwest Relay provided service within the continental United States and linked the east and west coast stations.

Overseas primary relay stations were established in Japan, the Philippines, Hawaii, Alaska, Eritrea, and Germany. Secondary overseas stations were provided in Okinawa, Taiwan, South Korea, Cyprus, Turkey, Italy, Germany, France, the Panama Canal Zone, and the United Kingdom.

== Systems ==
Switching systems were provided by the Automatic Electric Company, printers by the Kleinschmidt Division of Smith-Corona-Marchand, and the East Coast troposcatter systems were provided by the Collins Radio Company.

Message transmission used a variety of means, including radio, coaxial cable, and wire systems operated by the Signal Corps and AT&T. Traffic was controlled by the STARCOM Switched Transceiver Network.

== Fate ==
During the 1960s the system was absorbed into the DCA, which consolidated separate Army, Navy and Air Force systems. STARCOM was superseded by the DCA-operated AUTODIN system.

The Davis facility was decommissioned between 1967 and 1970 after AUTODIN and communications satellites superseded its function.

At East Coast Relay the STARCOM system was replaced with a major AUTODIN node, which was eventually one of the last AUTODIN centers to be phased out..
