= Starcom Systems =

Company specializing in wireless systems based in Jersey

Starcom Systems Inc.
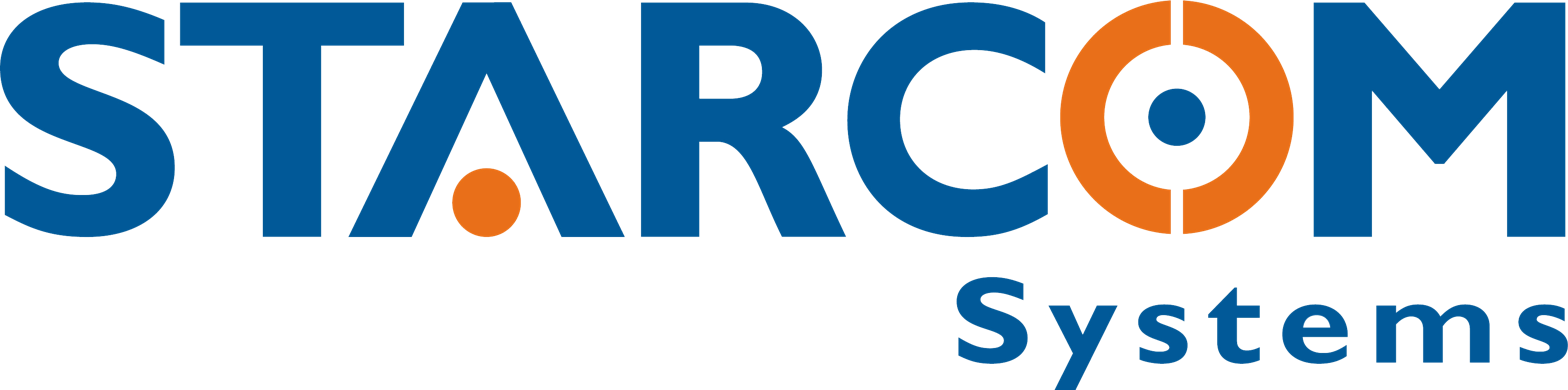
- Company type: Public
- Traded as: AIM: STAR
- Industry: Telematics
- Founded: 2004
- Headquarters: Jersey, Channel Islands
- Area served: Worldwide
- Key people: Avi Hartmann, CEO, Doron Kedem, COO, Ehud Shenig, CFO, Uri Hartmann, CTO
- Products: Helios, Watchlock™, Tetis, Kylos, Rainbow
- Revenue: US$ 9 million (2013)
- Number of employees: 40 (2013)
- Website: www.starcomsystems.com

Starcom Systems Inc. is a company based in Jersey, Channel Islands, specializing in wireless systems for remote tracking, monitoring and protection of a variety of assets. The company's products are based on telematics technology and include tracking and security systems for vehicles, systems for shipping containers and merchandise, and personal locators. Its two main products are the Helios system, used for gathering location and monitoring data from vehicles, and the award-winning Watchlock padlock, which also functions as a digital security system.

== History ==
The company was founded in 2004, focusing on vehicle tracking for insurance purposes. In 2005, the company introduced a vehicle location and fleet management system which was a predecessor for its later flagship product, Helios. In 2005, the company has opened its regional sales office in Argentina, followed by an office Kenya in 2008. The Helios was released to the market in 2008, followed by other tracking systems for a variety of purposes in 2012. In 2013, Starcom Systems raised £2.7 million on London's Alternative Investment Market. The company's total sales in 2013 amounted to $9 million. In 2014, the company announced that it has to defer the recognition of revenues on orders due to the effects the annexation of Crimea by the Russian Federation has had on a distributor in Ukraine.

== Products ==
Starcom Systems manufactures several systems for different tracking purposes, each designated for a specific kind of asset.

- Helios - an automatic vehicle location and fleet management system.
- Watchlock – a security padlock integrated with a monitoring system that provides both location information and periodical reports.
- Tetis – a shipping container tracking system based on wireless sensors within the container.
- Kylos – a portable GPS tracking unit for merchandise and personal goods as baggage, with a built-in battery and no need for an external power supply.
- Rainbow - a personal tracking device, designed for the remote monitoring of individuals at a certain level of risk – old people or young children.

== Recognition ==
WatchLock has won the “Physical Security Product of the Year” award at the IFSEC International 2012, Security Industry Awards event.
