= Women's Land Army (disambiguation) =

The Women's Land Army was a British civilian organisation recreated in 1939. It was first created during World War I so women could work in agriculture.

Women's Land Army may also refer to:

- Women's Land Army (World War I)
- Women's Land Army of America
- Australian Women's Land Army
- New Zealand Women's Land Army
