= Date–time group =

Set of characters used to express date and time

In communications messages, a date–time group (DTG) is a set of characters, usually in a prescribed format, used to express the year, the month, the day of the month, the hour of the day, the minute of the hour, and the time zone, if different from Coordinated Universal Time (UTC). The order in which these elements are presented may vary. The DTG is usually placed in the header of the message. One example is "13:19 Aug 14, 2026 (UTC)"; while another example is "13:19 14 Aug 2026".

The DTG may indicate either the date and time a message was dispatched by a transmitting station or the date and time it was handed into a transmission facility by a user or originator for dispatch.

The DTG may be used as a message identifier if it is unique for each message.

== US military date-time group ==
A form of DTG is used in the US military's Defense Message System (a form of Automated Message Handling System). In US military messages and communications (e.g., on maps showing troop movements) the format is DD HHMM (SS) Z MON YY. Although occasionally seen with spaces, it can also be written as a single string of characters. Three different formats can be found:

- DDHHMMSSZmmmYY – Full time (used for software timestamps)
- DDHHMMZmmmYY – shortened time (used e.g. for timestamps manually written)
- DDHHMMZ – short time (e.g. used for planning)

Z references the military identifier of time zone:

- UTC-12: Y (e.g., Baker Island)
- UTC-11: X (American Samoa, Niue)
- UTC-10: W (Honolulu, HI)
- UTC-9: V (Juneau, AK)
- UTC-8: U (PST, Los Angeles, CA)
- UTC-7: T (MST, Denver, CO)
- UTC-6: S (CST, Dallas, TX)
- UTC-5: R (EST, New York, NY)
- UTC-4: Q (Halifax, Nova Scotia)
- UTC-3: P (Buenos Aires, Argentina; Rio de Janeiro, Brazil)
- UTC-2: O (South Georgia and the South Sandwich Islands)
- UTC-1: N (Azores)
- UTC+-0: Z (Zulu time, GMT, London)
- UTC+1: A (CET, Stockholm, Copenhagen, Berlin, Paris, Rome, Madrid, Valletta)
- UTC+2: B (EET, Athens)
- UTC+3: C (Arab Standard Time, Iraq, Bahrain, Kuwait, Saudi Arabia, Yemen, Qatar, as well as Moscow in Russia)
- UTC+4: D (Oman, the UAE)
- UTC+5: E (Pakistan, western Kazakhstan, Tajikistan, Uzbekistan, and Turkmenistan)
- UTC+6: F (eastern Kazakhstan, Bangladesh)
- UTC+7: G (Thailand)
- UTC+8: H (Beijing, China, Singapore, Macau, Hong Kong)
- UTC+9: I (Tokyo, Japan)
- UTC+10: K (Australian Eastern Standard Time)
- UTC+11: L (Australian Eastern Daylight Time)
- UTC+12: M (Wellington, New Zealand)

=== Examples ===
Example 1: 051100Z represents the 5th day of the current month 11:00 (UTC).

Example 2: 091630Tjul11 represents 9 July 2011 4:30 pm (MST).

Example 3: 14131900ZAug26 represents the current time of refresh: (Aug) 14 13:19:00, Aug 2026 (UTC).

== Sources ==
- MIL-STD-2500A 12 October 1994

== See also ==
- Calendar date
- ISO 8601
