= Neubronner =

Neubronner is a surname. Notable people with the surname include:

- Alfred De Windt Neubronner (1844–1915), Siamese diplomat and linguist
- Julius Neubronner (1852–1932), German apothecary, inventor, company founder, and photographer
