= Pigeon intelligence =

Intellectual capacity of pigeons

Pigeons have featured in numerous experiments in comparative psychology, including experiments concerned with animal cognition, and as a result there is considerable knowledge of pigeon intelligence.

Available data show, for example, that:

- Pigeons have the capacity to share attention between different dimensions of a stimulus, but (like humans and other animals) their performance with multiple dimensions is worse than with a single stimulus dimension.
- Pigeons can be taught relatively complex actions and response sequences, and can learn to make responses in different sequences.
- Pigeons readily learn to respond in the presence of one simple stimulus and withhold responding in the presence of a different stimulus, or to make different responses in the presence of different stimuli.
- Pigeons can discriminate between other individual pigeons, and can use the behaviour of another individual as a cue to tell them what response to make.
- Pigeons readily learn to make discriminative responses to different categories of stimuli, defined either by arbitrary rules (e.g. green triangles) or by human concepts (e.g. pictures of human beings).
- Pigeons do less well with categories defined by abstract logical relationships, e.g. "symmetrical" or "same", though some experimenters have successfully trained pigeons to discriminate such categories.
- Pigeons seem to require more information than humans for constructing a three-dimensional image from a plane representation.
- Pigeons seem to have difficulty in dealing with problems involving classes of classes. Thus they do not do very well with the isolation of a relationship among variables, as against a representation of a set of exemplars.
- Pigeons can remember large numbers of individual images for a long time, e.g. hundreds of images for periods of several years.

All these are capacities that are likely to be found in most mammal and bird species. In addition pigeons have unusual, perhaps unique, abilities to learn routes back to their home from long distances. This homing behaviour is different from that of birds that learn migration routes, which usually occurs over a fixed route at fixed times of the year, whereas homing is more flexible; however similar mechanisms may be involved.

Pigeons showed mirror-related behaviours during the mirror test.

== Discrimination abilities of pigeons ==
In an article from 1995, Watanabe, Sakamoto, and Wakita described an experiment which showed that pigeons can be trained to discriminate between paintings by Picasso and by Monet. The birds were first trained on a limited set of paintings. The experiment has shown that a pigeon was able to obtain food by repeated pecking when shown a painting from Picasso; when it was a Monet, pecking had no effect. After a while, the pigeons would only peck when shown Picasso paintings. They were then able to generalize and correctly discriminate between paintings of the two painters not previously shown, and even between cubist and impressionist paintings (cubism and impressionism being the two stylistic schools Picasso and Monet belong to). When the Monet paintings were shown upside down, the pigeons were not able to properly categorize anymore. Showing the cubist works upside down did not have such an effect.

In 1995, the authors won the Ig Nobel Prize in psychology for this work.

In a later paper, Watanabe showed that if pigeons and human college students undergo the same training, their performance in distinguishing between Van Gogh and Chagall paintings is comparable.

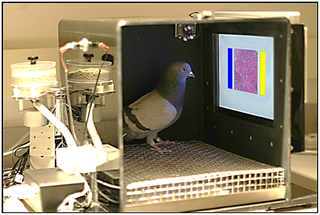
The chamber used to train and test pigeons' ability to classify images. Adapted from

Similar experiments had previously shown that pigeons could be trained to distinguish between photographs of human beings and photographs of other objects, such as trees.

In all these cases, discrimination is quite easy for humans, even though the classes are so complex that no simple distinguishing algorithm or rule can be specified. It has therefore been argued that pigeons are able to form "concepts" or "categories" similar to humans, but that interpretation is controversial. Nevertheless, the experiments remain important and often cited examples in cognitive science.

Levenson et al. demonstrated in a 2015 paper that rock dove pigeons (Columba livia), which share many visual system properties with humans, can serve as promising surrogate observers of medical images, a capability not previously documented. The birds were tested on their ability to distinguish benign from malignant human breast histopathology images and could even apply what they had learned to previously unseen images. However, when faced with a more challenging task, they reverted to image memorisation and thus showed little generalisation to novel examples.

== See also ==
- Animal intelligence
- Bird intelligence
- Pigeon photography
- Project Pigeon
- Richard Herrnstein
- Ludwig Huber
