= Degeorge =

Degeorge is a French language surname that stems from the male given name George. Notable people with the name include:

- Charles Degeorge (1837–1888), French sculptor, and medallist
- Clair DeGeorge (born 1999), American ice hockey player
- Joe DeGeorge (1987), American musician
- Mike DeGeorge (born 1970), American basketball coach
- Thomas Degeorge (1786–1854), French Neoclassical painter

== See also ==
- George (surname)
