= Roshan Chirag =

Breed of pigeon

Roshan Chirag is a homing pigeon breed from northern India. The name comes from roshan, meaning "enlightened", and chirag, meaning "candle". This breed was developed in India and is found extensively in the north of that country. There are two sub-breeds of these birds, the "sun" and the "moon" type: aftabi roshan chirag and mehtabi roshan chirag, respectively.

The breed has a black neck, black or brown bars, a shiny body, and red eyes with red circle round around them.

== See also ==
- List of pigeon breeds
