= Lebanon pigeon =

Breed of pigeon

Lebanon
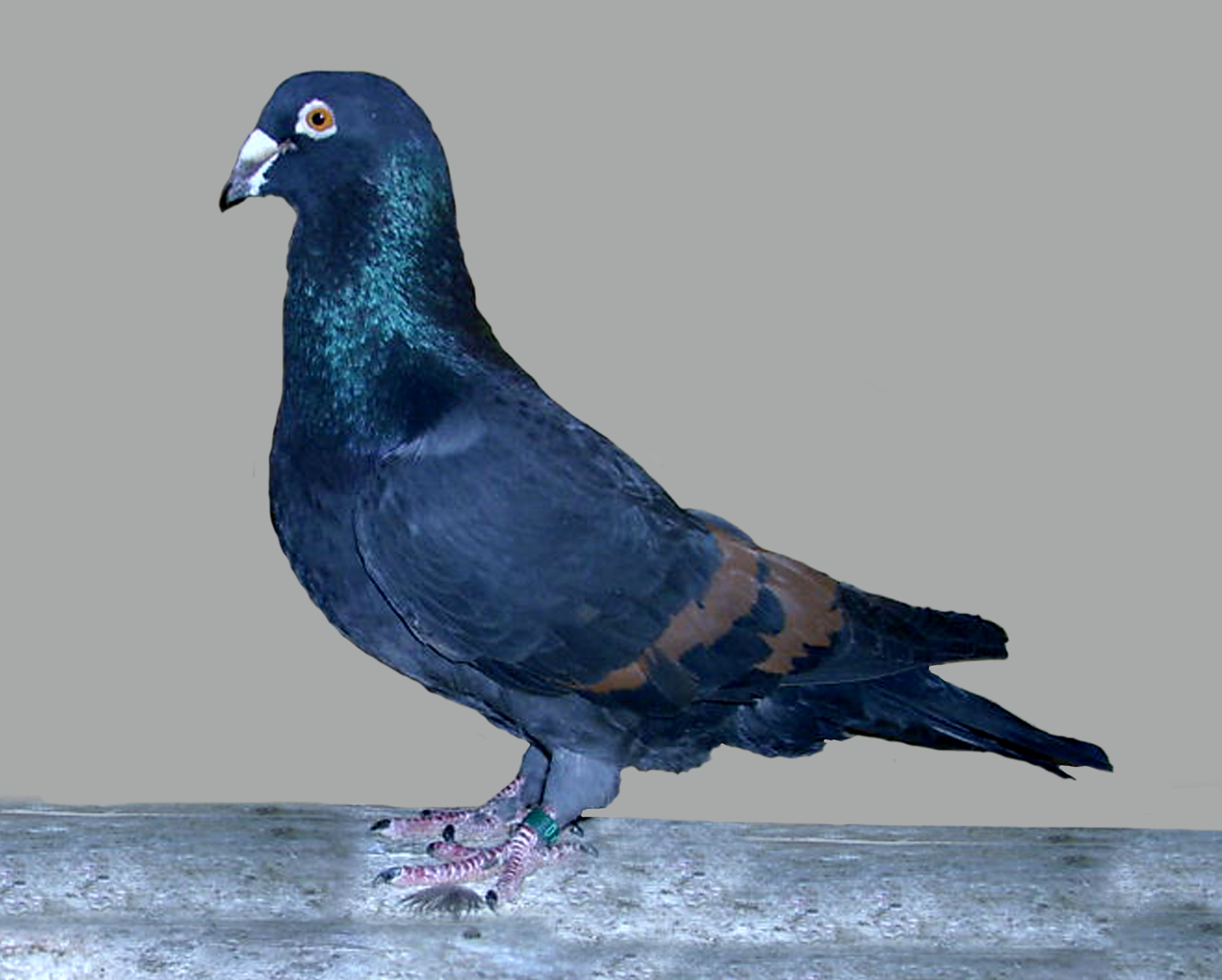
- Bronze Barred
- Conservation status: Rare
- Country of origin: Lebanon

Traits
- Crest type: none
- Feather ornamentation: none

Classification
- Australian Breed Group: Group 4 Homers & Hens
- US Breed Group: Syrian
- EE Breed Group: Not listed

The Lebanon pigeon is a breed of Domestic pigeon developed through selective breeding The Lebanon along with other varieties of domesticated pigeons are all descendants from the rock dove (Columba livia).

== Characteristics ==
The Lebanons are usually classed with Syrian Dewlaps, but typically they have little or no dewlap. They are a flying breed about the size of a homing pigeon. They have been selected mostly for their striking coloration.

They are colored red, yellow, blue and black, often with white bars or spangles.

=== History ===
The Lebanon is a rare Asiatic breed which is thought to have originated in Syria. The earliest European report on the breed is in a French book by Boitard and Corbie published in 1824. They called it "Pigeon miroite rouge de Damas" -- the red spangled pigeon of Damascus. The breed was imported to Germany by Dr. Binder of Triest in the 1880s. The breed was named "Lebanon" after the Lebanese mountains of its homeland. The breed arrived in the United States around 1955, imported directly from Damascus by a Mr. Shaheed.

== Gallery ==
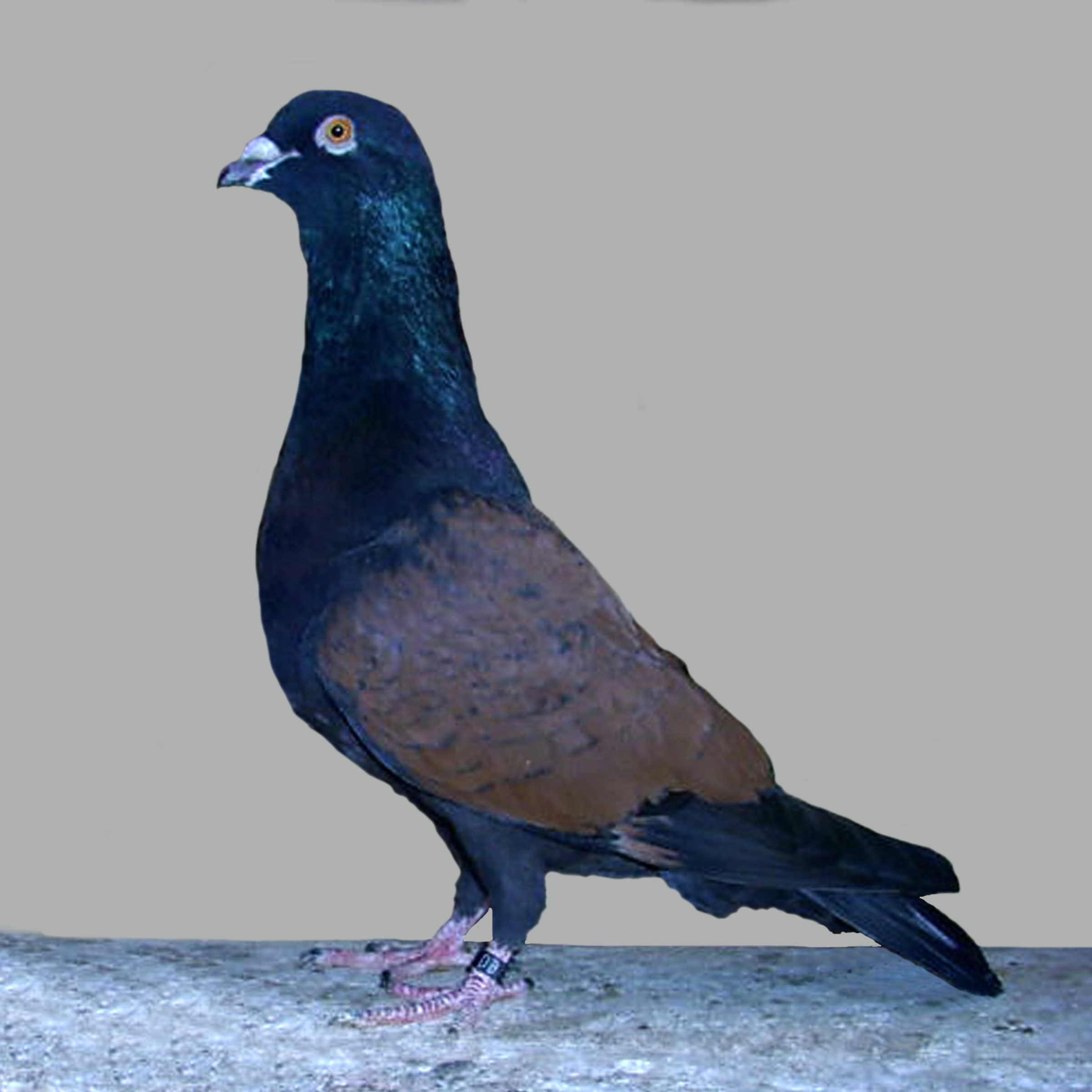

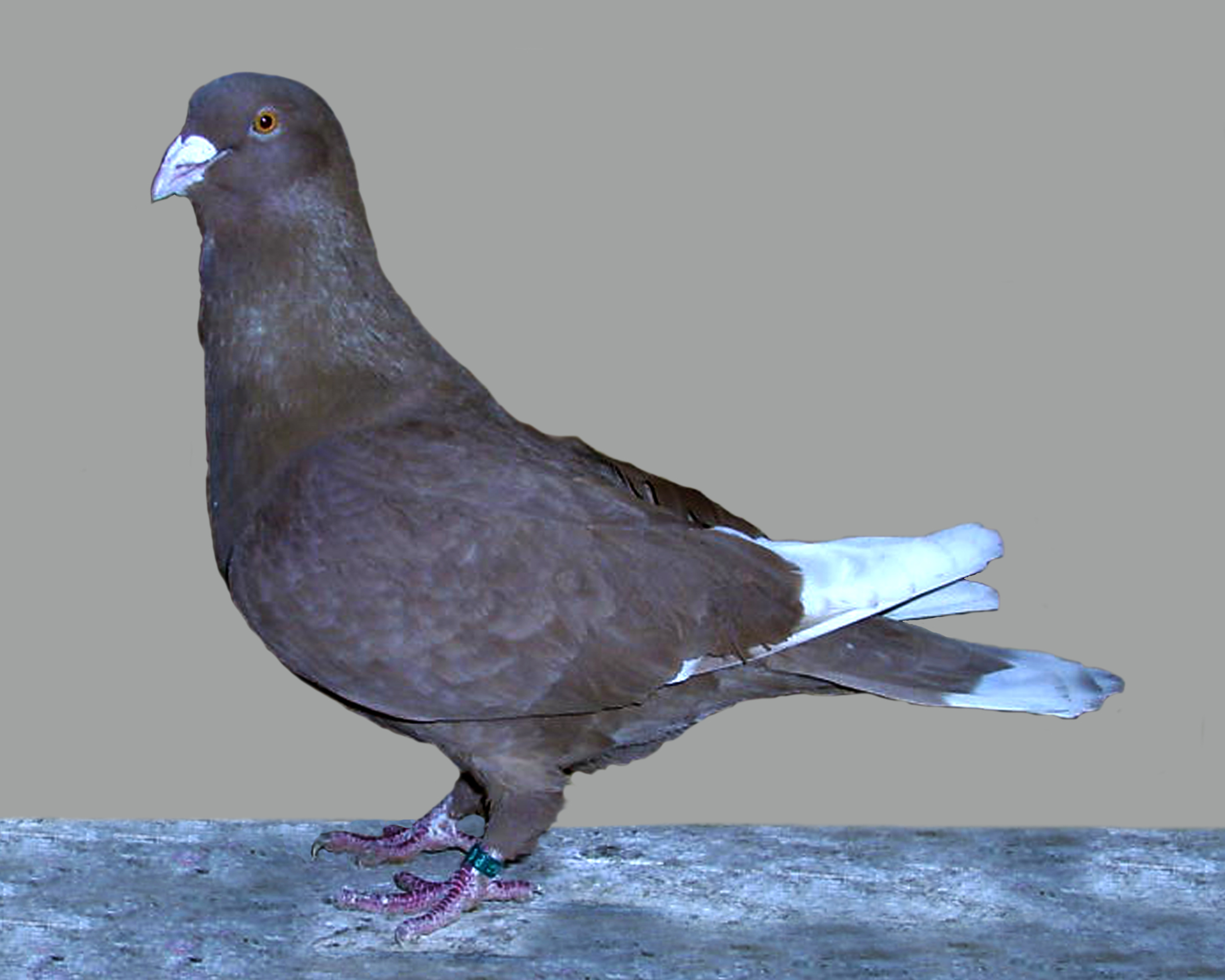

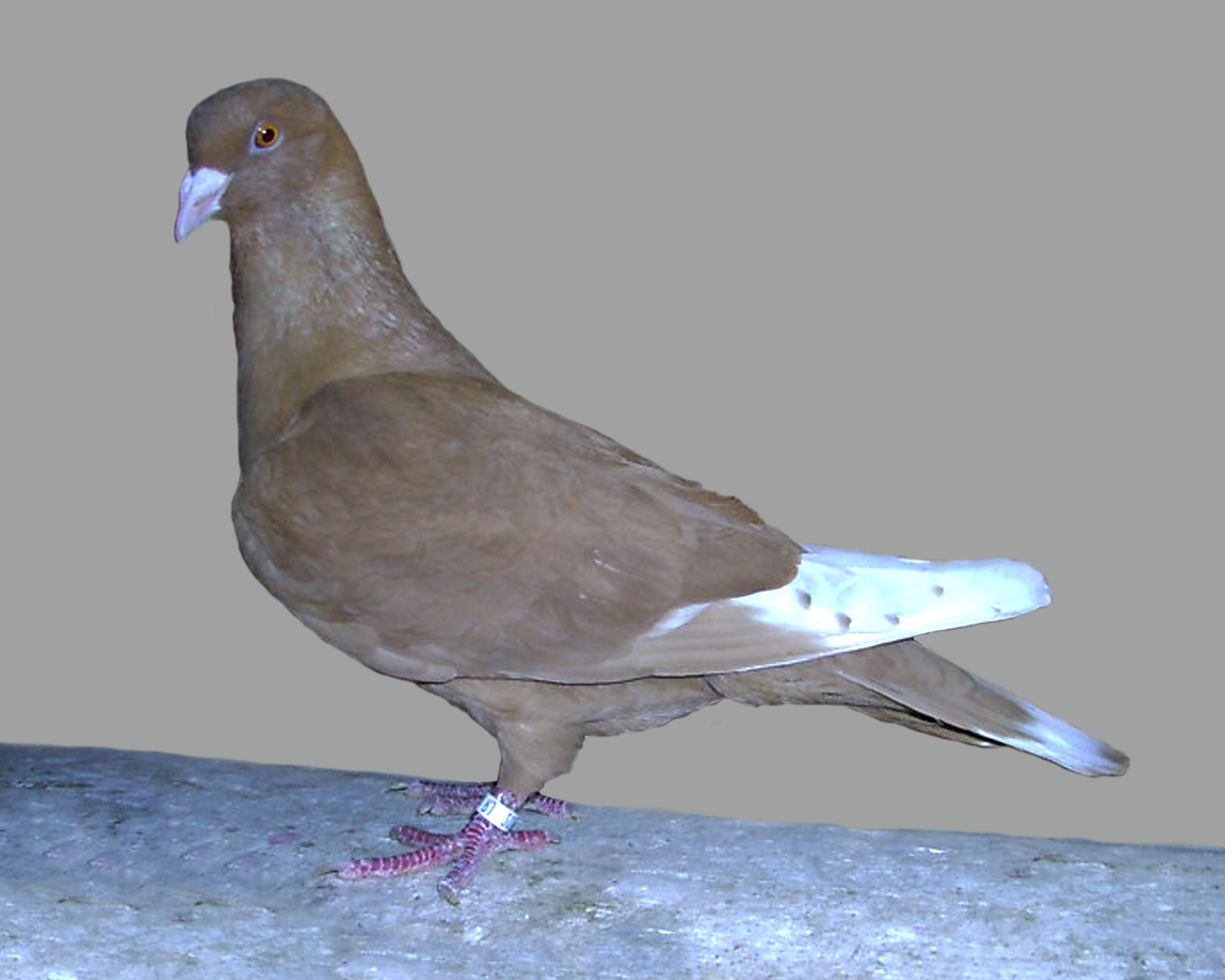

== Basic needs ==
Pigeons are fed either a raw whole grain or a pellet mix designed specifically for pigeons. There are mixes on the market designed specifically for pigeons. Inorganic materials are also needed in their diets, including salts, minerals, and calcium. Mixes made specifically for pigeons are readily available, called pigeon grit. Clean water is naturally also required. Pigeons suck water to drink, as you do with a straw. A container with at least one inch or more of free standing water is perfect.

== See also ==
- List of pigeon breeds
- 1994 Geflügel-Börse #2
- Media related to Lebanon (pigeon) at Wikimedia Commons
