= Doppel-Sport Panoramic Camera =

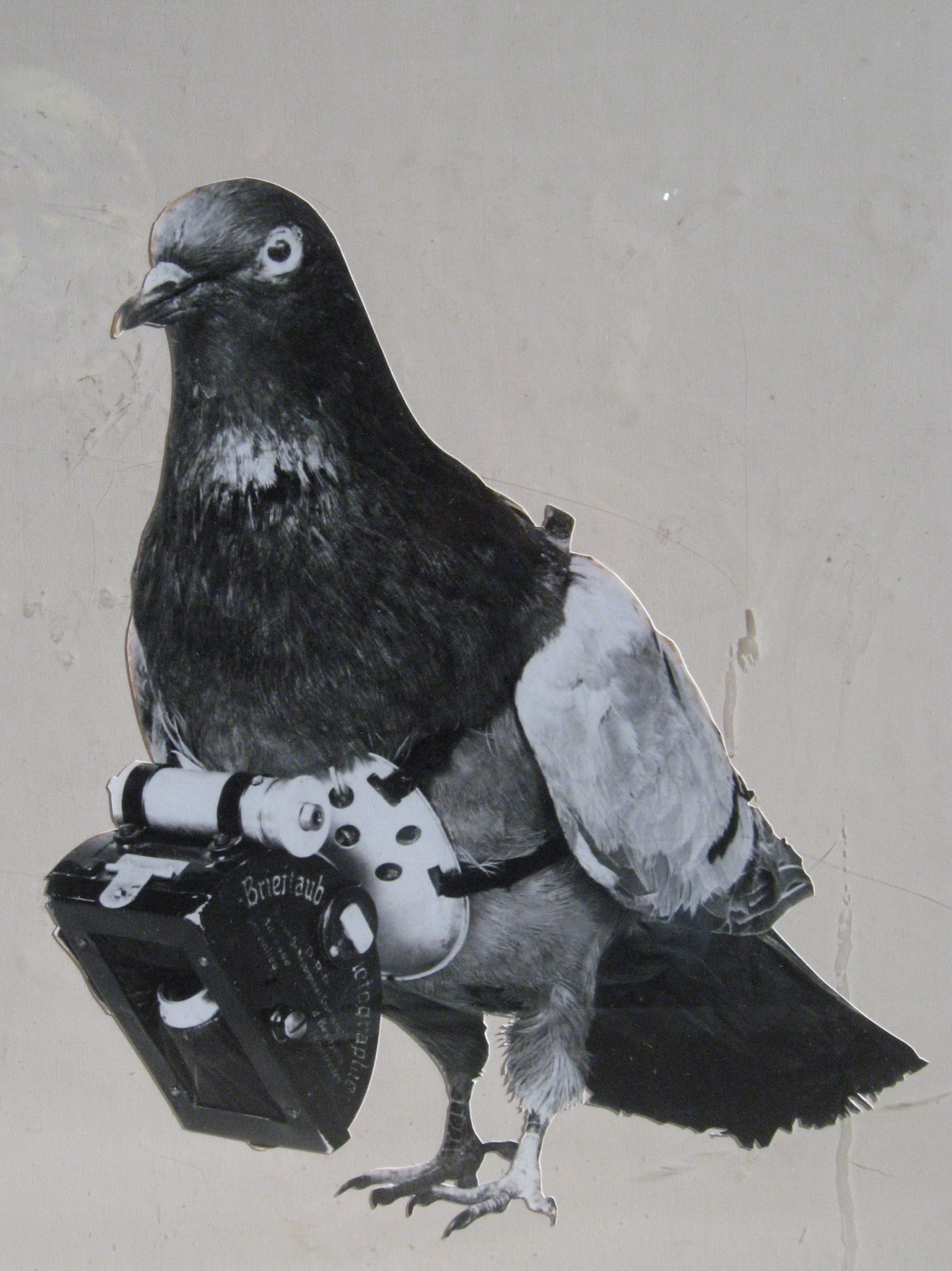

The Doppel-Sport Panoramic Camera was created in 1912 by Julius Neubronner in Kronberg, Germany to take aerial photographs by means of pigeon photographers. Neubronner had created a pamphlet describing this process in 1909. This camera was carried by pigeons and used to spy on the French during World War I, although it was described as taking pictures that had low quality. The camera used a breast-mounted pneumatically delayed timer camera with a swing lens. The Doppel-Sport had an exposure of 3 cm x 8 cm.

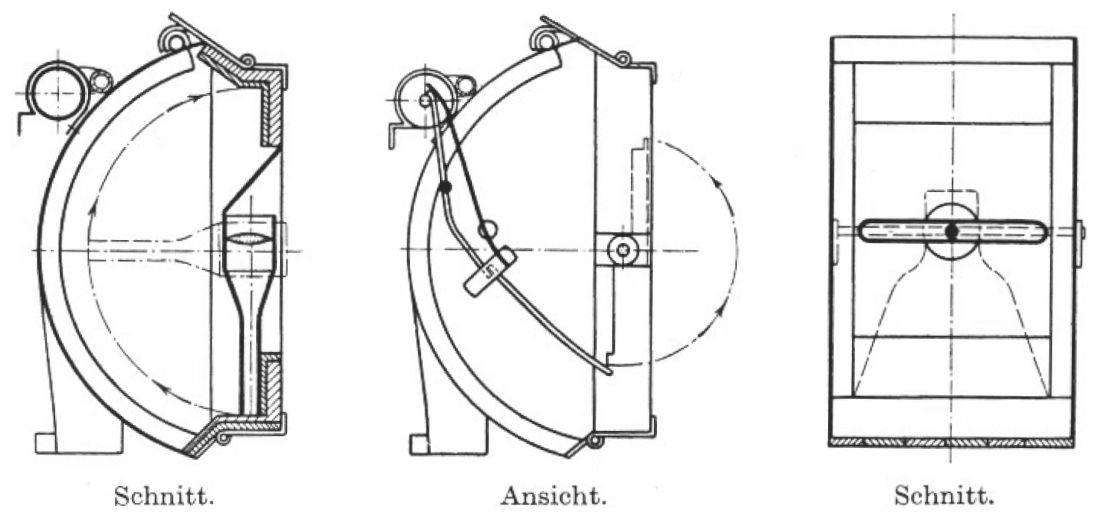
Technical drawing of one of Neubronner's panorama cameras.

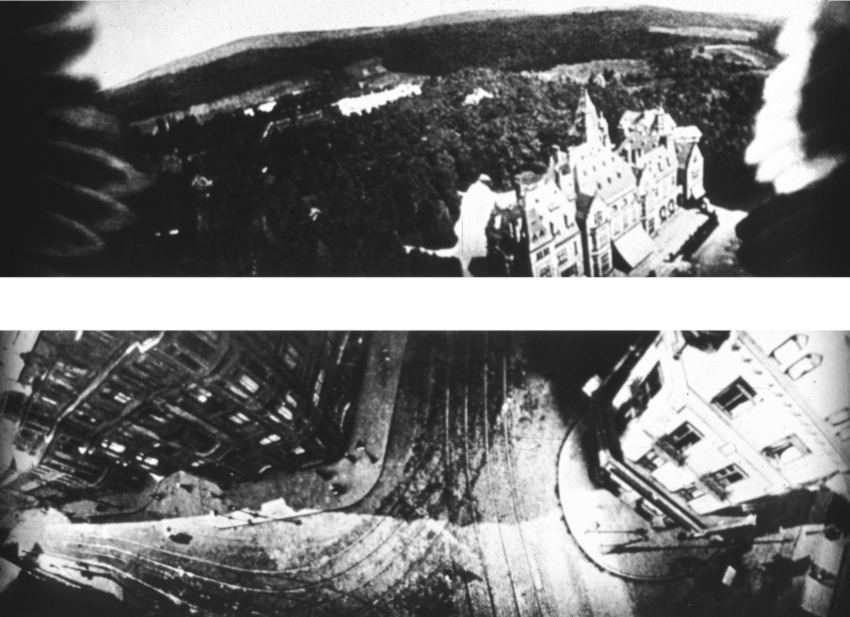
Two examples of photos taken.

== Sources ==
- Panoramic Cameras 1843-1994

American Society of Photogrammetry (1960). Manual of Photographic Interpretation. University of Michigan.
