= Source Columba =

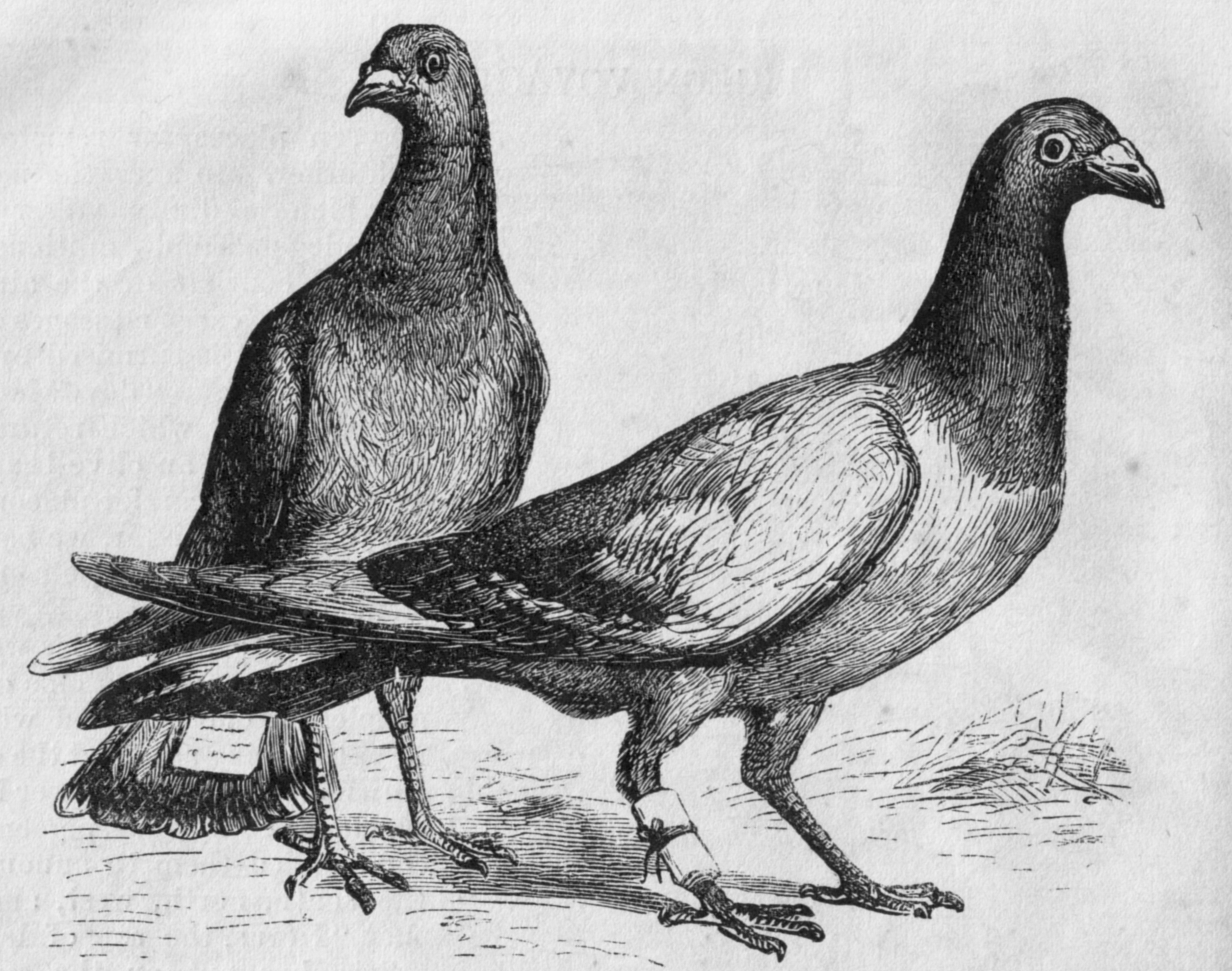
Homing pigeons such as these served with the Confidential Pigeon Service.

According to a 2007 newspaper report, Source Columba (Latin columba, "pigeon") was the code name for the Confidential Pigeon Service, an unconventional British intelligence gathering operation in World War II.

It involved air-dropping homing pigeons behind enemy lines in German-occupied France and the Netherlands as a means for locals to convey information, such as troop movements, to British intelligence. From 1940 onwards, more than 16,000 pigeon cases were parachuted into Europe, each case including – apart from the pigeon – sheets of very thin paper, a special pencil and a tube for storing the message, as well as French and Dutch instructions on how to fill in a report. A recent copy of a London newspaper was also included as proof of good faith.

In 1944, prior to the imminent Allied invasion, German counterintelligence sought to counteract (or co-opt) Source Columba by dropping pigeons of their own. These pigeon cases, accompanied by a packet of English cigarettes, were purporting to be British also and carried instructions to communicate the names of the local patriots to the Allies. The Résistance, for its part, let it be known that the best way to deal with these false birds would be to smoke the cigarettes and eat the pigeons.

Despite such interference, the operation was reported to have been remarkably successful, yielding useful intelligence in over fifty percent of the received messages. 31 Source Columba pigeons eventually received the Dickin Medal, the highest British military decoration for animals. The operation became public only after National Archives files relating to it were released in 2007. However the method and a few actual cases were described in some detail in Dr R.V. Jones' autobiographical book Most Secret War in 1978.
