= Julius Neubronner =

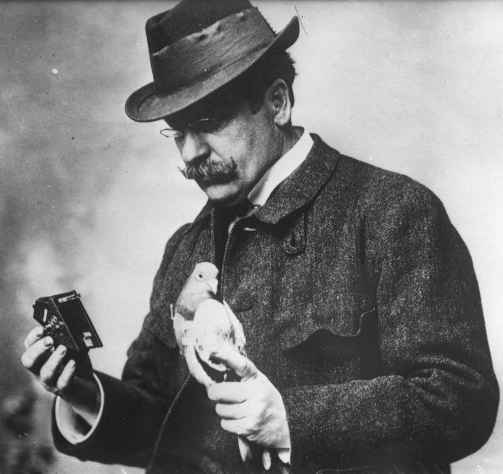
- Neubronner in 1914
- Born: Julius Gustav Neubronner; 8 February 1852; Kronberg im Taunus, Duchy of Nassau
- Died: 17 April 1932 (aged 80)
- Occupations: Apothecary, inventor

Julius Gustav Neubronner (8 February 1852 – 17 April 1932) was a German apothecary, inventor, company founder, and a pioneer of amateur photography and film. He was part of a dynasty of apothecaries in Kronberg im Taunus. Neubronner was court apothecary to Kaiserin Friedrich, invented the pigeon photographer method for aerial photography, was one of the first film amateurs in Germany, and founded a factory for adhesive tapes. After his death, the company was directed for 70 years by his son Carl Neubronner (13 January 1896 – 19 November 1997).

== Father and grandfather ==
The Neubronner family was resident in Kronberg as an apothecaries' family since Christian Neubronner had taken over a pharmacy there in 1808. In 1844 the pharmacy passed to his son Sohn Wilhelm Georg Neubronner (1813–1894), a longtime friend of painter Anton Burger and father of Julius Neubronner. During the Revolution of 1848 he directed the local militia. The wife of Wilhelm Neubronner and mother of Julius Neubronner came from the Löwe dynasty of actors, and her sister was the singer Sophie Löwe.

== Adolescence ==
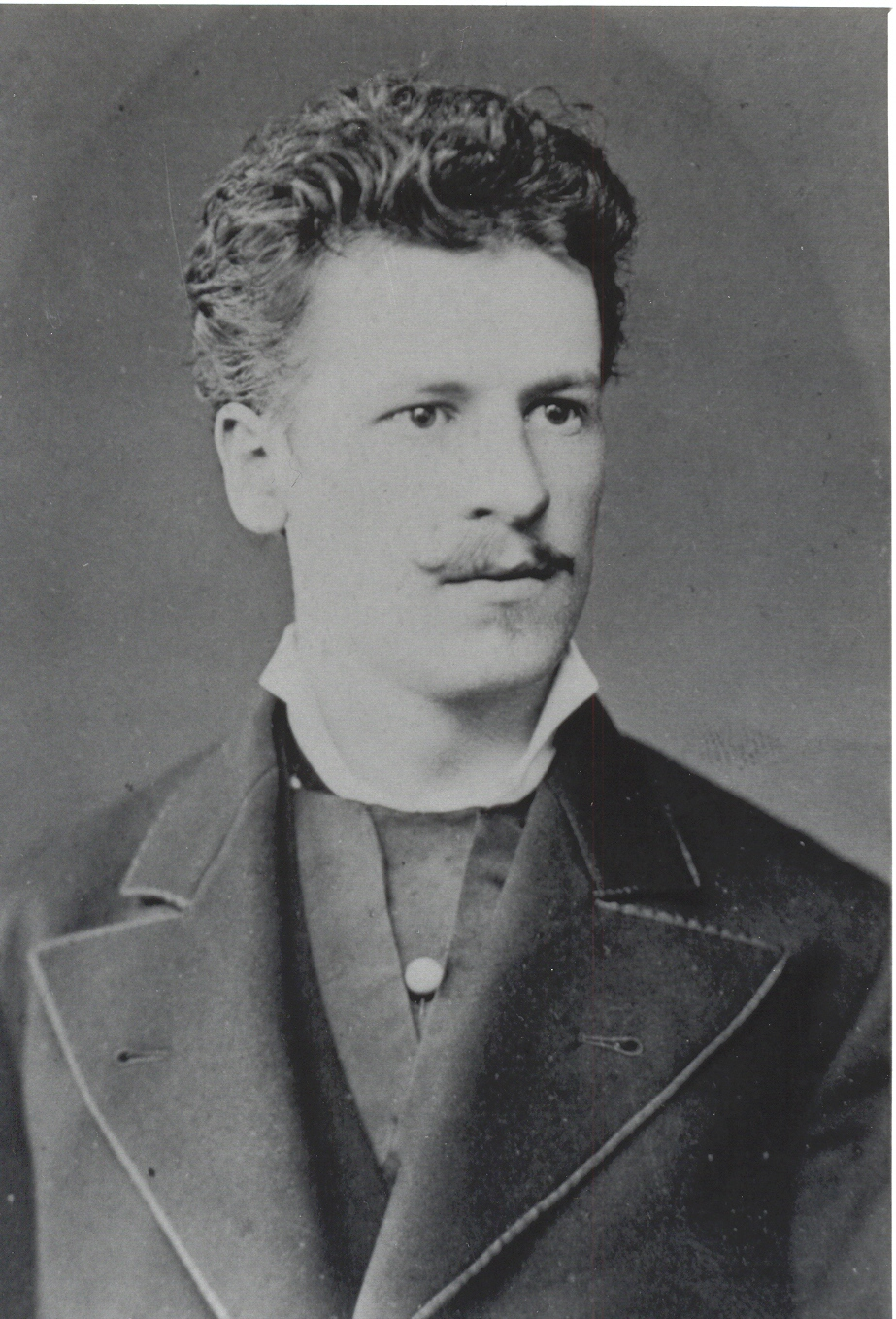
Julius Neubronner 1877 while studying in Gießen

From adolescence, Julius Neubronner was a passionate amateur photographer. In 1865 he found a camera for the Talbot system which his father had built on his own shortly after the invention of photography. All experiments with the obsolete camera failed, and together with a friend the boy secretly bought another camera on credit.

Neubronner initially received his education at home, together with two sisters. His godfather Julius Löwe operated a chemical laboratory in Frankfurt, and from 1864 the now twelve-year-old boy attended the Gymnasium in that city. After three years he changed to Weilburg, where he received the mittlere Reife. After a year of apprenticeship in his father's pharmacy he attended the Royal Realgymnasium in Wiesbaden. He fulfilled his military duties at least partially in the Province of Hanover. In 1873 he finished his apprenticeship as apothecary's assistant in a pharmacy in Berlin, followed by three practical years in pharmacies in Bendorf, Frankfurt, Hannoversch-Münden and Nyon. In Nyon he got into contact with stereoscopy.

From 1876, Neubronner studied pharmacy in Gießen, where he joined the Akademisch-Naturwissenschaftlicher Verein (now a Burschenschaft). Shortly after his pharmaceutical examination in 1877, he began to study chemistry in Berlin in 1878, but soon switched to Heidelberg, where he received his doctorate in 1879.

== Pharmacy and factory ==
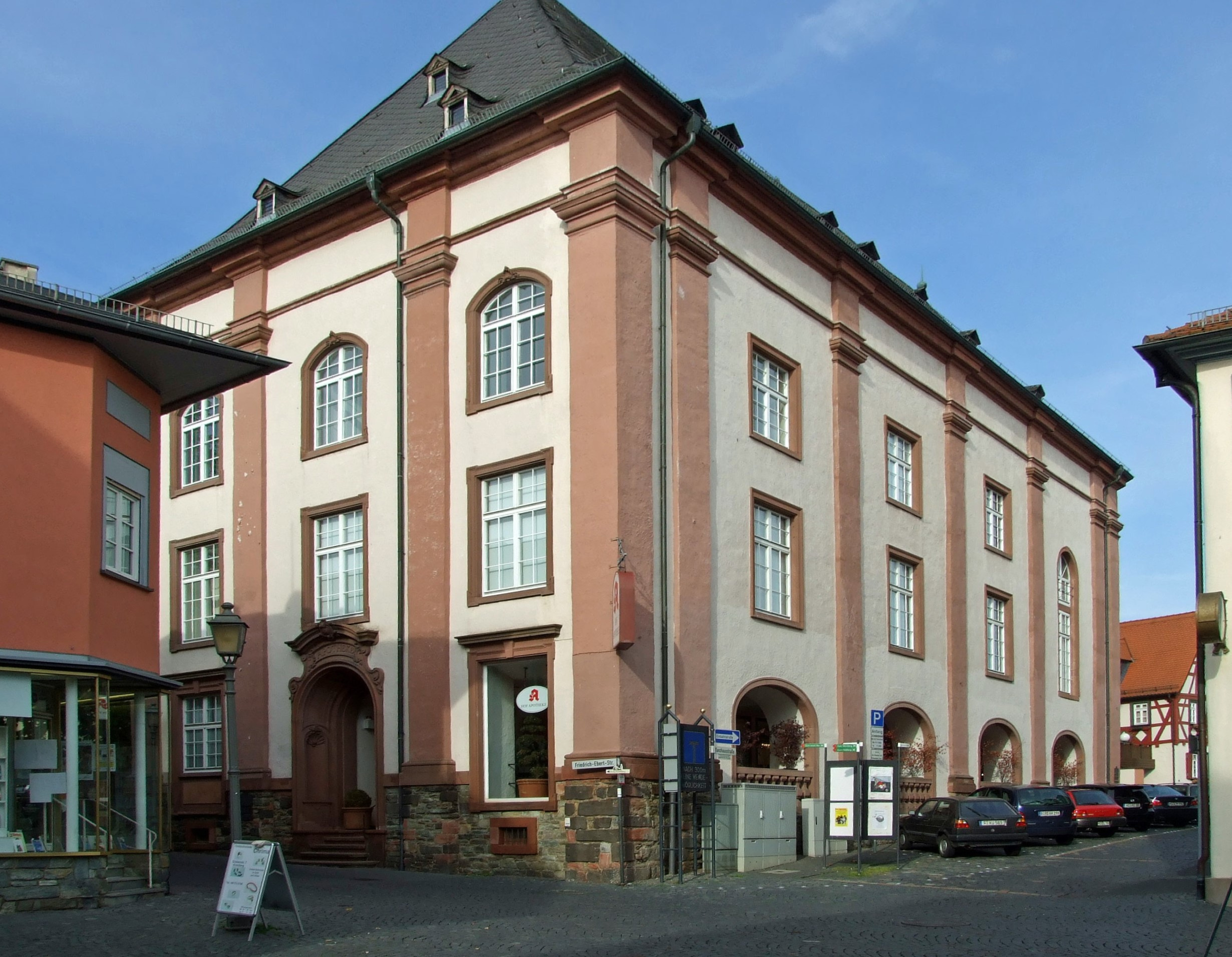
Streitkirche in Kronberg with pharmacy

In 1886, Julius Neubronner took over the pharmacy in Kronberg from his father. In 1887 he bought an important historical building known as Streitkirche ('dispute church'). Planned as a catholic church in the Protestant town of Kronberg, but never inaugurated, it had been the object of a notable conflict. After the necessary modifications (the building had previously been used as an inn), family and pharmacy could move into the building in 1891.

When Emperor Frederick III died in the Year of the Three Emperors 1888 after only 99 days in office, his widow Victoria, Princess Royal, known in Germany as Kaiserin Friedrich, had Schloss Friedrichshof constructed as her new residence in the forest near Kronberg. Neubronner now obtained the rank of a court apothecary.

Wilhelm Neubronner had used pigeon post for fast delivery of prescriptions, but had stopped the practice after a few years, when the neighbouring villages received their own pharmacies. Inspired by a newspaper report in 1902 that described a similar practice of an apothecary in Boston and showed a lack of awareness with his father's achievements, Julius Neubronner took up and expanded the practice. By pigeon post he obtained urgent chemicals up to 75 grams (2.6 oz) from his wholesaler in Frankfurt and delivered urgent medication to the sanatorium in Falkenstein (Königstein im Taunus) The notable sanatorium, founded in 1876 by Peter Dettweiler, was replaced by a recreation home for officers between 1907 und 1909.

Between 1903 and 1920 Neubronner recorded a number of amateur films which were restored by the Deutsches Filmmuseum between 1994 and 1996 and later published on YouTube. The cumbersome process of gluing glass photographs for laterna magica presentations inspired him to invent a form of adhesive paper tape, which he patented. For production and marketing he founded the Fabrik für Trockenklebematerial in 1905. Under the name Neubronner GmbH & Co. KG it still exists and has around 80 employees.

== Private life and pigeon photography ==
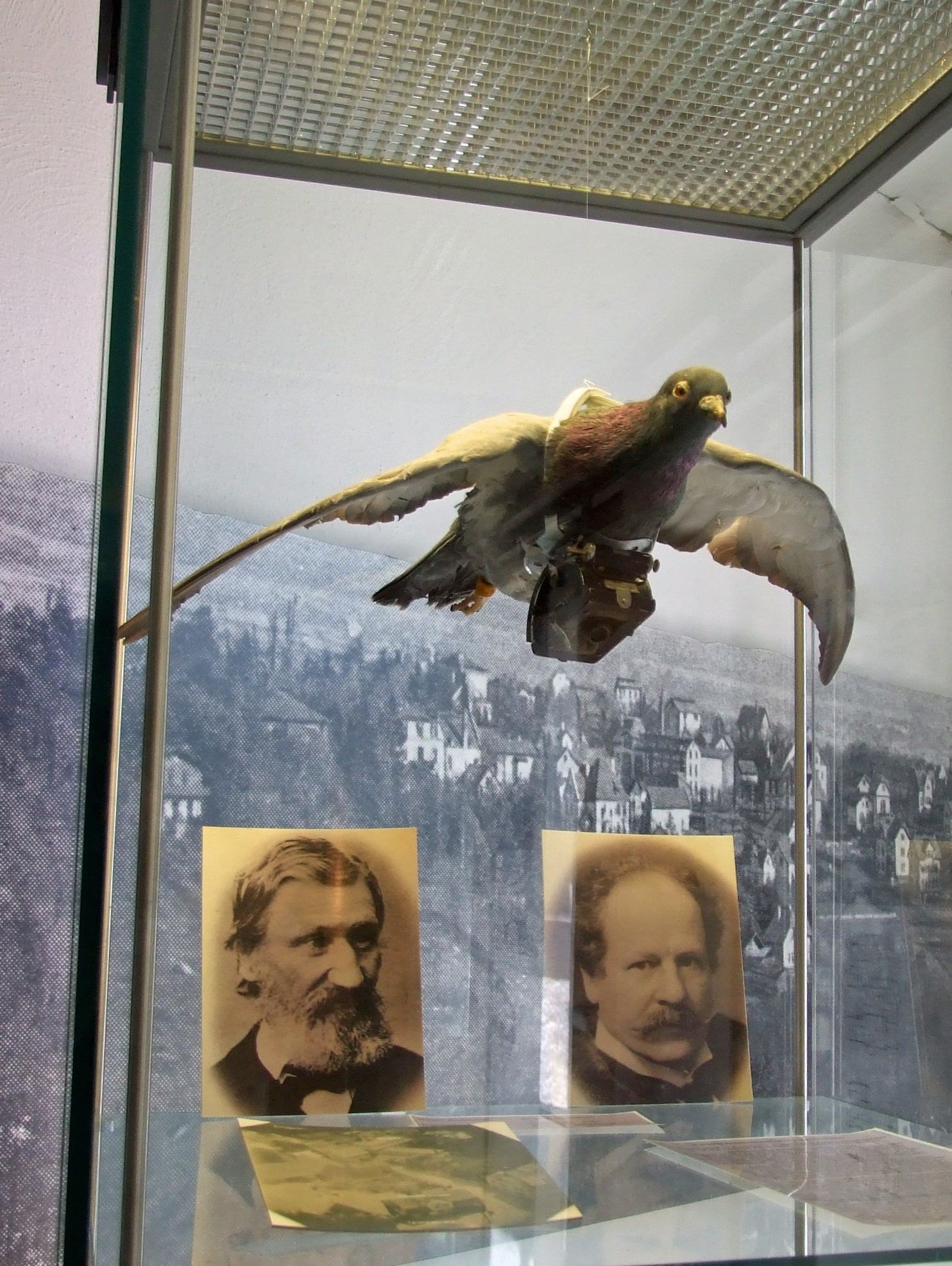
Stadtmuseum Kronberg

In 1886, Julius Neubronner married Charlotte Stiebel (1865–1924). Her father Fritz Stiebel (1824–1902) was a well-known physician in Frankfurt. Her maternal grandfather was Jacques Reiss (1807–1887), patron and honorary citizen of Kronberg and main initiator of the Cronberger Eisenbahn-Gesellschaft (Kronberg Railway Society).

Like his father, Julius Neubronner was a friend and sponsor of a Kronberg-based group of notable painters known as Kronberger Malerkolonie, whose museum is now located on the first floor of his house. In 1907, he joined the Senckenberg Nature Research Society

In 1907, Neubronner submitted a patent for his invention of aerial photography by means of a pigeon photographer; he was granted the patent in 1908. The invention brought him international notability after he presented it to an interested audience at international expositions in Dresden, Frankfurt and Paris in 1909–1911. Spectators in Dresden could watch the arrival of the camera-equipped carrier pigeons, and the photos were immediately developed and turned into postcards which could be purchased. At the 1910 and 1911 Paris Air Shows he received two gold medals, for the method and for the photographs. The invention was tried out for military air surveillance in the First World War and later, but apart from honourable mentions in encyclopedias (Meyers Konversations-Lexikon, Brockhaus Enzyklopädie) it only caused him expenses.

== Successors ==
After Julius Neubronner's death in 1932, the pharmacy stayed in the Neubronner family for two more generations. First it was managed by Wilhelm Neubronner, who wrote a book about Ice stock sport and was generally active in local and national sports. With his death in 1972, his son Kurt-Heinz Neubronner took over the pharmacy, but in 1995 it was sold.

The factory was taken over by Julius Neubronner's youngest son Carl Neubronner (13 January 1896 – 19 November 1997), who managed it for 70 years. In 1957 he received the Federal Cross of Merit (1st class), in 1966 he made the staff share the company's profits, and he was active in an industry association. Carl Neubronner became known for his experiments with model aircraft: At the age of 16 he developed the "Raketoplan", a rocket-propelled model airplane, and the national rocket model aircraft club still awards an annual Carl Neubronner Prize. In 1984 he became honorary citizen of Kronberg. Since 1987 the Carl Neubronner Sports Foundation supports sports in Kronberg. Carl Neubronner was married to Erika Neubronner (1923–2005). In April 1997 they founded the socially oriented Carl and Erika Neubronner Foundation.
