= Alfred De Windt Neubronner =

Malaccan diplomat (1844–1915)

- Born: 26 March 1844; Malacca
- Died: 26 October 1915 (aged 71); Penang
- Occupation: Diplomat
- Spouse: Angelique Marie Arnott
- Children: 6

Alfred De Windt Neubronner (26 March 1844 – 26 October 1915) was a diplomat and linguist who served as consul for Siam (now Thailand) in Penang for 38 years at the end of the nineteenth century.

== Early life ==
Alfred De Windt Neubronner was born on 26 March 1844 in Malacca, the son of Thomas Neubronner and Clemantine Agnes Pernaud. His descendants were from a German noble family which had settled in Malacca in the early nineteenth century and had intermarried with Dutch Eurasians.

== Career ==
Neubronner began his career in 1873 serving as chief clerk to the Resident Councillor in Malacca and then moved to Penang to take up a similar role. In 1877, he left the government of the Straits Settlements and became the consul in Penang for the government of Siam, taking over from his uncle William Thomas Little who had occupied the post from 1863. Siam regarded Penang as an important port which was frequently visited by Siamese trading ships. He remained the consul for Siam in Penang for 38 years and in recognition of his services was given the rank of Phra by the government of Siam, and later the title Phya Thaweep Siamakitch by the king, the highest rank that can be given to a civilian foreigner.

Whilst serving as head of the Siamese consulate in Penang, he was also appointed agent for the Perak government and was responsible for revenue collection in Perak and the western provinces of Siam. He could speak the Siamese and Malay languages, and was frequently appointed as interpreter by the government of the Straits Settlements including during the disturbances in Perak and Sungei Ujong. He also served on the committee of the Penang Free School and Muslim and Hindu Endowment Boards, and acted for 25 years as chief coroner on the island.

In 1906, he was involved in a controversy which arose from his close relations with the wealthy Sino-Thai Khaw family who had given him a position at one of their companies. When the Thai baht currency was introduced in southern Siam, the opium farm in Phuket owned by the Khaw family immediately purchased one million baht using a draft issued by the consulate in Penang at a low rate of exchange. Shortly afterwards, the exchange rate was raised providing instant profit to the Khaws, and Neubronner and others, including the Royal Commissioner of Phuket, were accused of currency manipulation by delaying sending information to other traders about the rate hike. In response, the accused stated that it was impossible to send any news because the telegraph line from Penang to Phuket had broken down.

Neubronner retired as consul in September 1915 having resigned his position as agent for the Perak government five years earlier, and died at his home in Penang on 26 October 1915.

== Personal life ==
Neubronner married Angelique Marie Arnott in Malacca and they had one son and five daughters.
