= Charles Degeorge =

French sculptor

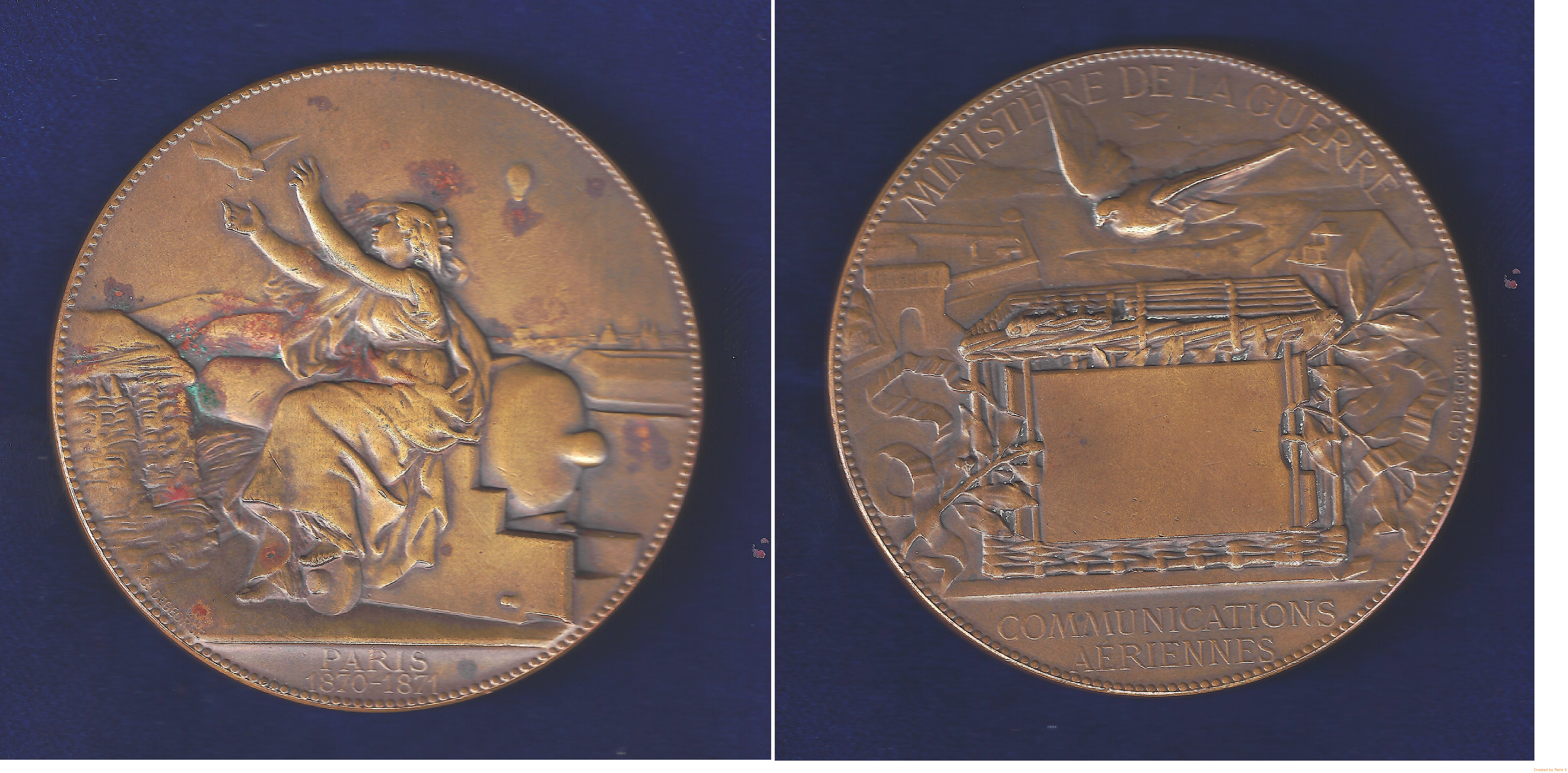
Popular is his pigeon post medal of the Siege of Paris 1870–1871, issued by the French Ministère de la Guerre.

Charles Jean Marie Degeorge (1837 in Lyon – 1888 in Paris) was a French sculptor, and medallist, whose best-known work, La jeunesse d'Aristote (The Youth of Aristotle) (1875) depicts the philosopher as a semi-nude teenage boy sitting in a large chair, looking bored as he studies a scroll. The statue is currently in the Musée d'Orsay.

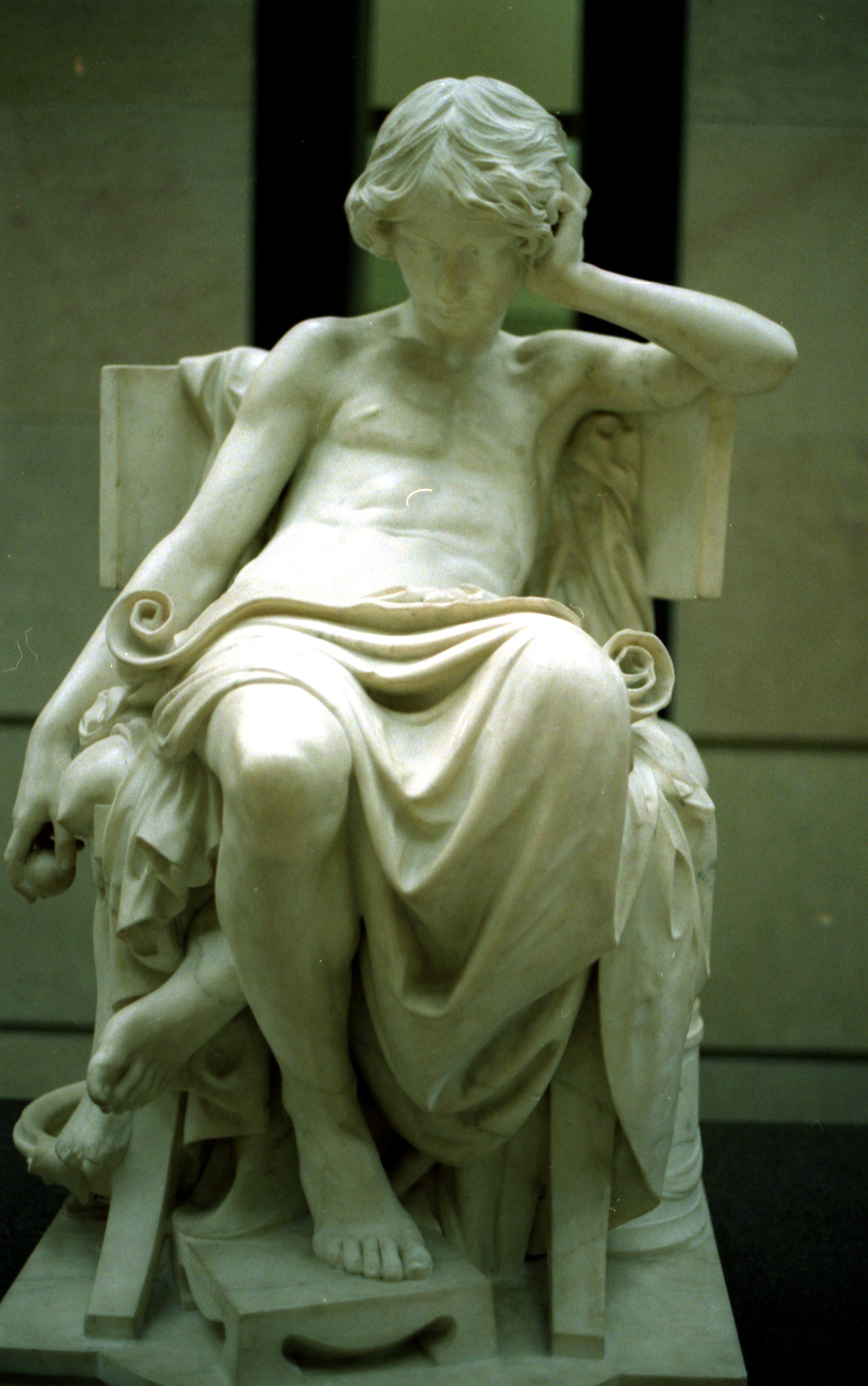
Charles Degeorge's statue La jeunesse d'Aristote

Degeorge also sculpted a bust of Henri Regnault which was incorporated into Regnault's monument at the École des Beaux Arts, Paris.
