= Pigeon photography =

Aerial photography by pigeons

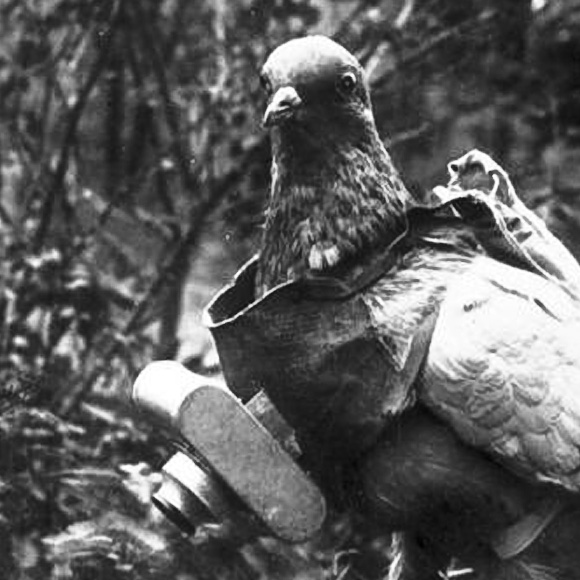
Pigeon with German miniature camera, probably during the First World War

Pigeon photography is an aerial photography technique invented in 1907 by the German apothecary Julius Neubronner, who also used pigeons to deliver medications. A homing pigeon was fitted with an aluminium breast harness to which a lightweight time-delayed miniature camera could be attached. Neubronner's German patent application was initially rejected, but was granted in December 1908 after he produced authenticated photographs taken by his pigeons. He publicized the technique at the 1909 Dresden International Photographic Exhibition, and sold some images as postcards at the Frankfurt International Aviation Exhibition and at the 1910 and 1911 Paris Air Shows.

Initially, the military potential of pigeon photography for aerial reconnaissance appeared interesting. Battlefield tests in World War I provided encouraging results, but the ancillary technology of mobile dovecotes for messenger pigeons had the greatest impact. Owing to the rapid development of aviation during the war, military interest in pigeon photography faded and Neubronner abandoned his experiments. The idea was briefly resurrected in the 1930s by a Swiss clockmaker, and reportedly also by the German and French militaries. Although war pigeons were deployed extensively during World War II, it is unclear to what extent, if any, birds were involved in aerial reconnaissance. The United States Central Intelligence Agency (CIA) later developed a battery-powered camera designed for espionage pigeon photography; details of its use remain classified.

The construction of sufficiently small and light cameras with a timer mechanism, and the training and handling of the birds to carry the necessary loads, presented major challenges, as did the limited control over the pigeons' position, orientation and speed when the photographs were being taken. In 2004, the British Broadcasting Corporation (BBC) used miniature television cameras attached to falcons and goshawks to obtain live footage, and today some researchers, enthusiasts and artists similarly deploy crittercams with various species of animals.

== Origins ==
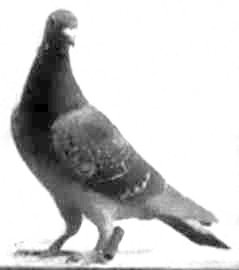
Four-year-old homing pigeon that made 15 ascents in a balloon

The first aerial photographs were taken in 1858 by the balloonist Nadar; in 1860 James Wallace Black took the oldest surviving aerial photographs, also from a balloon. As photographic techniques made further progress, at the end of the 19th century some pioneers placed cameras in unmanned flying objects. In the 1880s, Arthur Batut experimented with kite aerial photography. Many others followed him, and high-quality photographs of Boston taken with this method by William Abner Eddy in 1896 became famous. Amedee Denisse equipped a rocket with a camera and a parachute in 1888, and Alfred Nobel also used rocket photography in 1897.

Homing pigeons were used extensively in the 19th and early 20th centuries, both for civil pigeon post and as war pigeons. In the Franco-Prussian War of 1870, the famous pigeon post of Paris carried up to 50,000 microfilmed telegrams per pigeon flight from Tours into the besieged capital. Altogether 150,000 individual private telegrams and state dispatches were delivered. In an 1889 experiment of the Imperial Russian Technical Society at Saint Petersburg, the chief of the Russian balloon corps took aerial photographs from a balloon and sent the developed collodion film negatives to the ground by pigeon post.

== Julius Neubronner ==
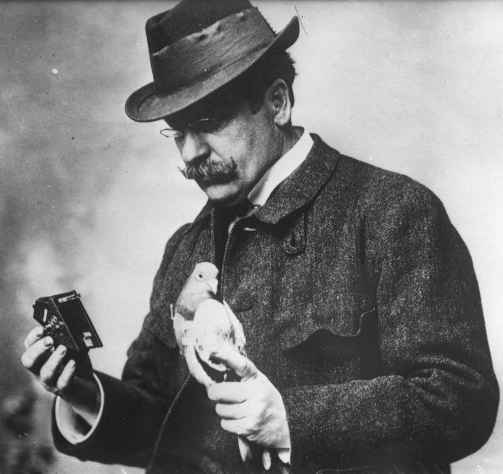
Julius Neubronner (1914)

In 1903 Julius Neubronner, an apothecary in the German town of Kronberg near Frankfurt, resumed a practice begun by his father half a century earlier and received prescriptions from a sanatorium in nearby Falkenstein via pigeon post. He delivered urgent medications up to 75 grams (2.6 oz) by the same method, and positioned some of his pigeons with his wholesaler in Frankfurt to profit from faster deliveries himself. When one of his pigeons lost its orientation in fog and mysteriously arrived, well-fed, four weeks late, Neubronner was inspired with the playful idea of equipping his pigeons with automatic cameras to trace their paths. This thought led him to merge his two hobbies into a new "double sport" combining carrier pigeon fancying with amateur photography. (Neubronner later learned that his pigeon had been in the custody of a restaurant chef in Wiesbaden.)

After successfully testing a Ticka watch camera on a train and while riding a sled, Neubronner began the development of a light miniature camera that could be fitted to a pigeon's breast by means of a harness and an aluminum cuirass. Using wooden camera models which weighed 30 to 75 grams (1.1 to 2.6 oz), the pigeons were carefully trained for their load. To take an aerial photograph, Neubronner carried a pigeon to a location up to about 100 kilometres (60 mi) from its home, where it was equipped with a camera and released. The bird, keen to be relieved of its burden, would typically fly home on a direct route, at a height of 50 to 100 metres (160 to 330 ft). A pneumatic system in the camera controlled the time delay before a photograph was taken. To accommodate the burdened pigeon, the dovecote had a spacious, elastic landing board and a large entry hole.

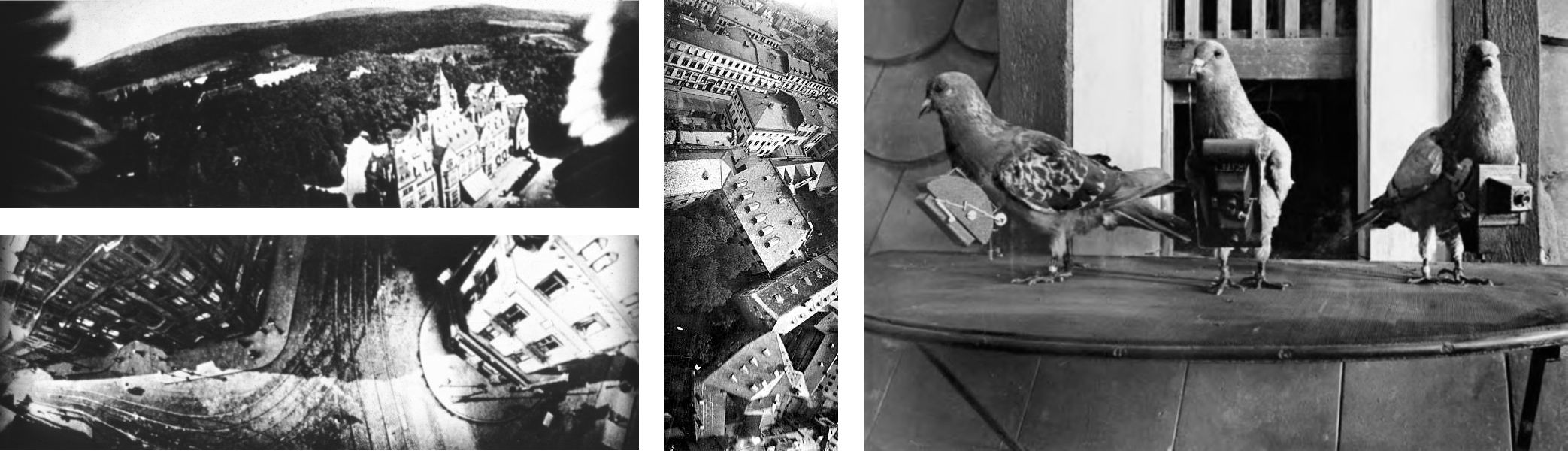
Top left: Aerial photographs of Schlosshotel Kronberg. Bottom left and center: Frankfurt. Right: Pigeons fitted with cameras.

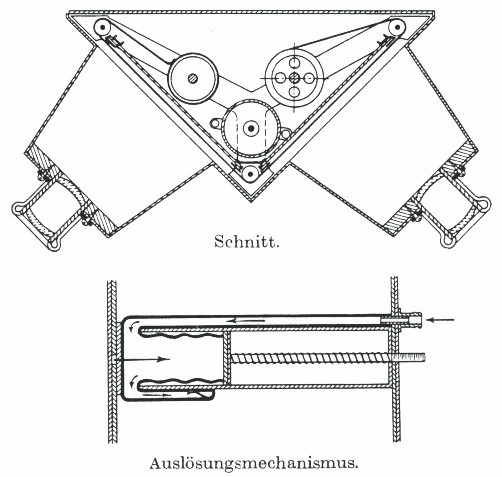
Top: Sectional view of patented pigeon camera with two lenses. Bottom: Pneumatic system. The camera was activated by inflating the chamber on the left. As the air slowly escaped through the capillary at the bottom, the piston moved back towards the left until it triggered the exposure.

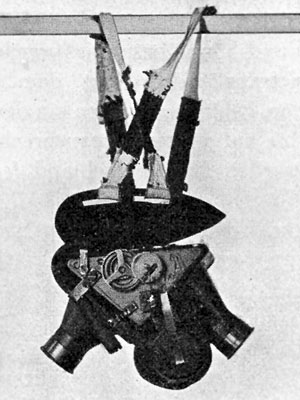
The patented camera with cuirass and harness

According to Neubronner, there were a dozen different models of his camera. In 1907 he had sufficient success to apply for a patent. Initially his invention "Method of and Means for Taking Photographs of Landscapes from Above" was rejected by the German patent office as impossible, but after presentation of authenticated photographs the patent was granted in December 1908. (The rejection was based on a misconception about the carrying capacity of domestic pigeons.) The technology became widely known through Neubronner's participation in the 1909 International Photographic Exhibition in Dresden and the 1909 International Aviation Exhibition in Frankfurt. Spectators in Dresden could watch the arrival of the pigeons, and the aerial photographs they brought back were turned into postcards. Neubronner's photographs won prizes in Dresden as well as at the 1910 and 1911 Paris Air Shows.

A photograph of Schlosshotel Kronberg (then called Schloss Friedrichshof after its owner Kaiserin Friedrich) became famous due to its accidental inclusion of the photographer's wing tips. In a breach of copyright it was shown in German cinemas as part of the weekly newsreel in 1929.

In a short book published in 1909 Neubronner described five camera models:

- The "double camera" described in the patent had two lenses pointing in opposite directions (forward/backward), each with a focal length of 40 mm. Operated by a single focal-plane shutter, the camera could take two simultaneous glass plate exposures at a time determined by the pneumatic system.
- A stereoscopic camera had similar characteristics, but both lenses pointed in the same direction.
- One model was capable of transporting film and taking several exposures in a row.
- One model had its lens fixed to a bag bellows. A scissor mechanism held the bellows in its expanded state until the photo was taken, but condensed it immediately afterwards. This allowed one exposure of size 6 cm × 9 cm on a photographic plate, at a focal length of 85 mm.
- In a panoramic camera, the focal-plane shutter was replaced by a rotation of 180° of the lens itself. This model was the basis for the Doppel-Sport Panoramic Camera, which Neubronner tried to market around 1910. It captured a panoramic view on 3 cm × 8 cm film. It never went into serial production, though.

In a 1920 pamphlet, Neubronner described his last model as weighing slightly more than 40 grams (1.4 oz) and being capable of taking 12 exposures. In 2007, a researcher remarked that only little technical information is available about lenses, shutters and the speed of the photographic media, but reported that Neubronner obtained the film for his panoramic camera from ADOX. For this camera he estimated a film speed of ISO 25/15° – 40/17° and a shutter speed of 1/60 s – 1/100 s. The film was cut to the format 30 mm × 60 mm and bent into a concave shape to prevent unnecessary distortion due to the half-circle movement of the lens.

In 1920 Neubronner found that ten years of hard work and considerable expenses had been rewarded only with his inclusion in encyclopedias and the satisfaction that an ancillary technology, the mobile dovecote (described below), had proved its worth in the war. Neubronner's panoramic camera is displayed at the German Museum of Technology in Berlin and the Deutsches Museum in Munich.

== First World War ==
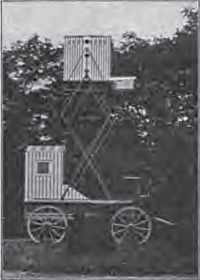
Neubronner's mobile dovecote and darkroom as shown at 1909 exhibitions

Neubronner's invention was at least partially motivated by the prospect of military applications. At the time, photographic aerial reconnaissance was possible but cumbersome, as it involved balloons, kites or rockets. The Wright brothers' successful flight in 1903 presented new possibilities, and surveillance aircraft were introduced and perfected during the First World War. But pigeon-based photography, despite its practical difficulties, promised to deliver complementary, detailed photographs taken from a lower height.

The Prussian War Ministry was interested, but some initial skepticism could only be overcome through a series of successful demonstrations. The pigeons proved relatively indifferent to explosions, but during battle a dovecote may need to be moved, and pigeons can take some time to orient to their new position. The problem of making carrier pigeons accept a displaced dovecote with only a minimum of retraining had been tackled with some success by the Italian army around 1880; the French artillery captain Reynaud solved it by raising the pigeons in an itinerant dovecote. There is no indication that Neubronner was aware of this work, but he knew there must be a solution as he had heard of an itinerant fairground worker who was also a pigeon fancier with a dovecote in his trailer. At the 1909 exhibitions in Dresden and Frankfurt he presented a small carriage that combined a darkroom with a mobile dovecote in flashy colors. In months of laborious work he trained young pigeons to return to the dovecote even after it was displaced.

In 1912 Neubronner completed his task (set in 1909) of photographing the waterworks at Tegel using only his mobile dovecote. Almost 10 years of negotiations were scheduled to end in August 1914 with a practical test at a maneuver in Strasbourg, followed by the state's acquisition of the invention. These plans were thwarted by the outbreak of the war. Neubronner had to provide all his pigeons and equipment to the military, which tested them in the battlefield with satisfactory results, but did not employ the technique more widely.

Instead, under the novel conditions of attrition warfare, war pigeons in their traditional role as pigeon post saw a renaissance. Neubronner's mobile dovecote found its way to the Battle of Verdun, where it proved so advantageous that similar facilities were used on a larger scale in the Battle of the Somme. After the war, the War Ministry responded to Neubronner's inquiry to the effect that the use of pigeons in aerial photography had no military value and further experiments were not justified.

The International Spy Museum in Washington D.C. includes a replica of a pigeon camera in its collection.

== Second World War ==
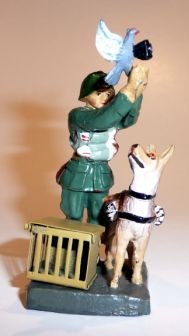
German toy soldier with camera pigeon

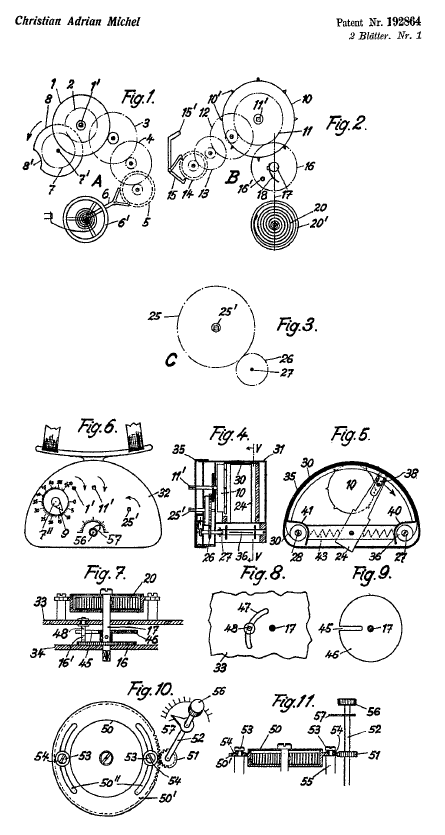
Drawing from Swiss patent

Despite the War Ministry's position immediately after the First World War, in 1932 it was reported that the German army was training pigeons for photography, and that the German pigeon cameras were capable of 200 exposures per flight. In the same year, the French claimed that they had developed film cameras for pigeons as well as a method for having the birds released behind enemy lines by trained dogs.

Although war pigeons and mobile dovecotes were used extensively during the Second World War, it is unclear to what extent, if any, they were employed for aerial photography. According to a report in 1942, the Soviet army discovered abandoned German trucks with pigeon cameras that could take photos in five-minute intervals, as well as dogs trained to carry pigeons in baskets. On the allied side, as late as 1943 it was reported that the American Signal Corps was aware of the possibility of adopting the technique.

It is certain, however, that during the Second World War pigeon photography was introduced into German nurseries in toy form. From around 1935 the toy figures produced under the brand Elastolin, some of which show motifs from before 1918 with updated uniforms, began to include a signal corps soldier with a pigeon transport dog. The figurine represents a soldier in the act of releasing a pigeon that carries an oversized pigeon camera.

Thanks to research conducted by the Musée suisse de l'appareil photographique at Vevey, much more is known about the pigeon cameras developed at about the same time by the Swiss clockmaker Christian Adrian Michel (1912–1980) in Walde. He was assigned to the Swiss Army's carrier pigeons service in 1931, and in 1933 he began work on adapting Neubronner's panoramic camera to 16 mm film, and improving it with a mechanism to control the delay before the first exposure and to transport the film between exposures. Michel's camera, patented in 1937, weighed only 70 grams (2.5 oz), and may have been one of the first to have a timer operated by clockwork.

Michel's plan to sell his camera to the Swiss Army failed, as he was unable to find a manufacturer to produce it in quantity; only about 100 of his cameras were constructed. After the outbreak of the Second World War Michel patented a shell and harness for the transport of items such as film rolls by carrier pigeon. Between 2002 and 2007 three of his cameras were auctioned by Christie's in London.

The Musée suisse de l'appareil photographique at Vevey holds around 1,000 photographs taken for test purposes during the development of Michel's camera. Most of the photos were taken with Agfa 16 mm orthopanchromatic film with a speed of ISO 8/10°. The exposed format was 10 mm × 34 mm. The quality was sufficient for a tenfold magnification. In the catalog of the 2007 exhibition Des pigeons photographes? they are classified as test photos on the ground or from a window, human perspectives from the ground or from elevated points, aeroplane-based aerial photographs, aerial photographs of relatively high altitude that were probably taken by pigeons released from a plane, and only a small number of typical pigeon photographs.

== After the Second World War ==
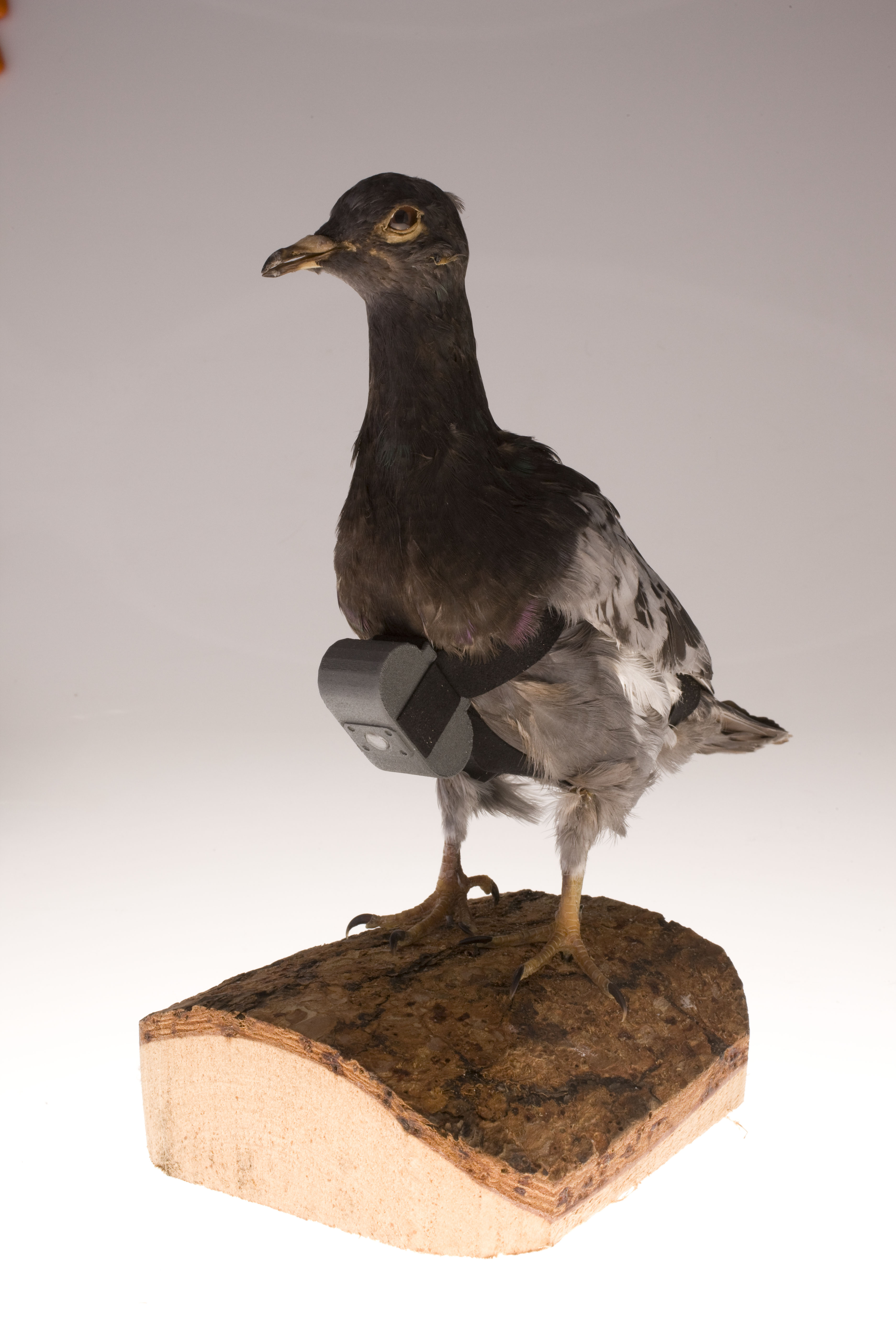
Pigeon camera in the CIA Museum

The United States Central Intelligence Agency (CIA) developed a battery-powered pigeon camera now on display in the CIA Museum's virtual tour. According to the website, the details of the camera's use are still classified. News reports suggest that the camera was used in the 1970s, that the pigeons were released from planes, and that it was a failure. In 1978 the Swiss magazine L'Illustré printed an aerial photograph of a street in Basel, taken by a pigeon of Febo de Vries-Baumann equipped with a camera with a hydraulic mechanism. In 2002–2003 the performance artist and pigeon fancier Amos Latteier experimented with pigeon photography using Advanced Photo System (APS) and digital cameras and turned the results into "PowerPointillist" lecture performances in Portland, Oregon. In a 2008 film adaptation of Sleeping Beauty by the German director Arend Agthe, the prince invents pigeon photography and discovers Sleeping Beauty on a photo taken by a pigeon.

In the 1980s a small number of high-quality replica Doppel-Sport cameras were made by Rolf Oberländer. One was acquired in 1999 by the Swiss Camera Museum in Vevey.

Modern technology allows extension of the principle to video cameras. In the 2004 BBC program Animal Camera, Steve Leonard presented spectacular films taken by miniature television cameras attached to eagles, falcons and goshawks, transmitted to a nearby receiver by microwaves. The cameras have a weight of 28 grams (1 oz). Miniature digital audio players with built-in video cameras can also be attached to pigeons. In 2009 researchers made news when a peer-reviewed article discussed the insights they gained by attaching cameras to albatrosses. The lipstick-sized cameras took a photo every 30 seconds.
