= Pigeon post =

Use of homing pigeons to carry messages

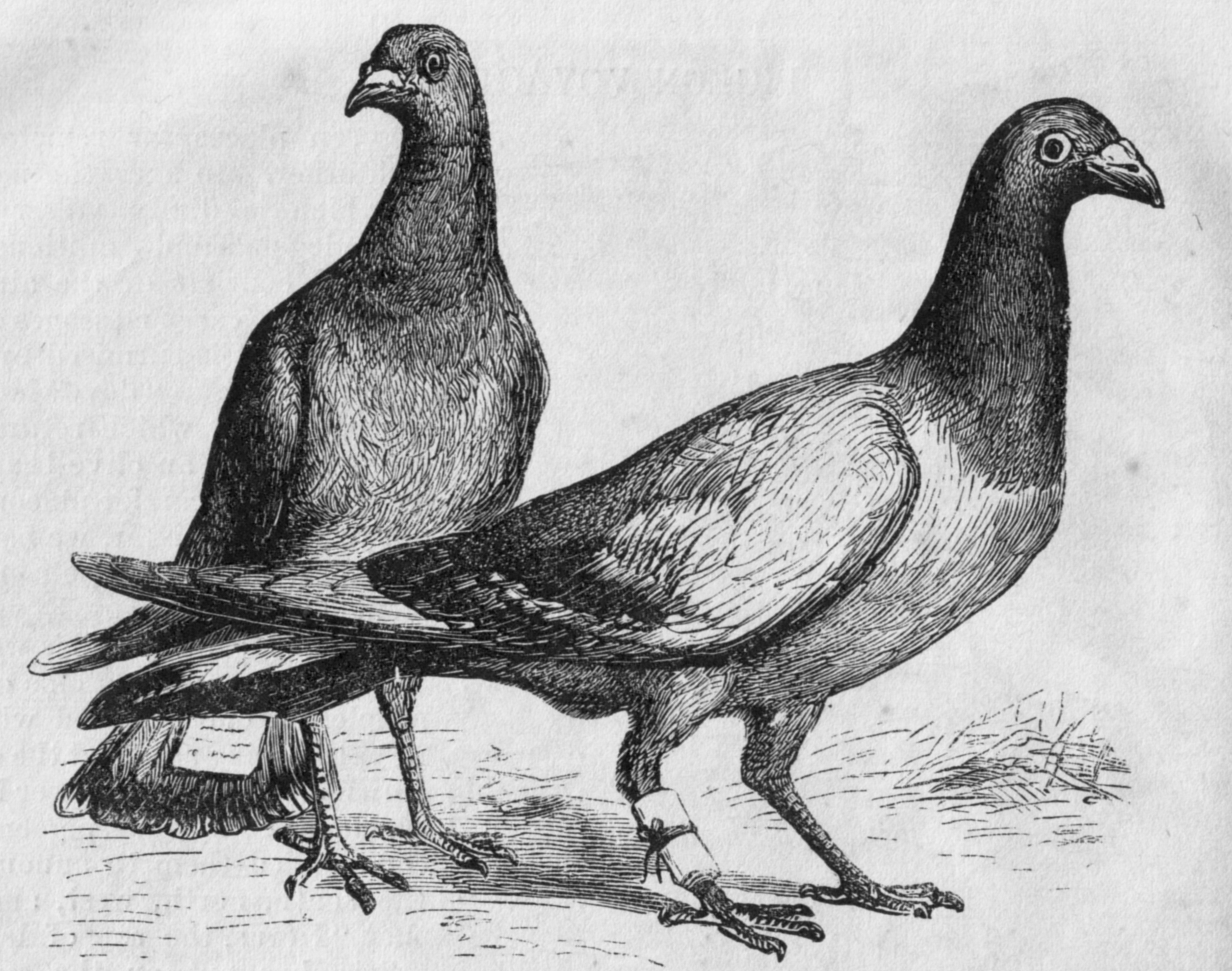
Pigeons with messages attached

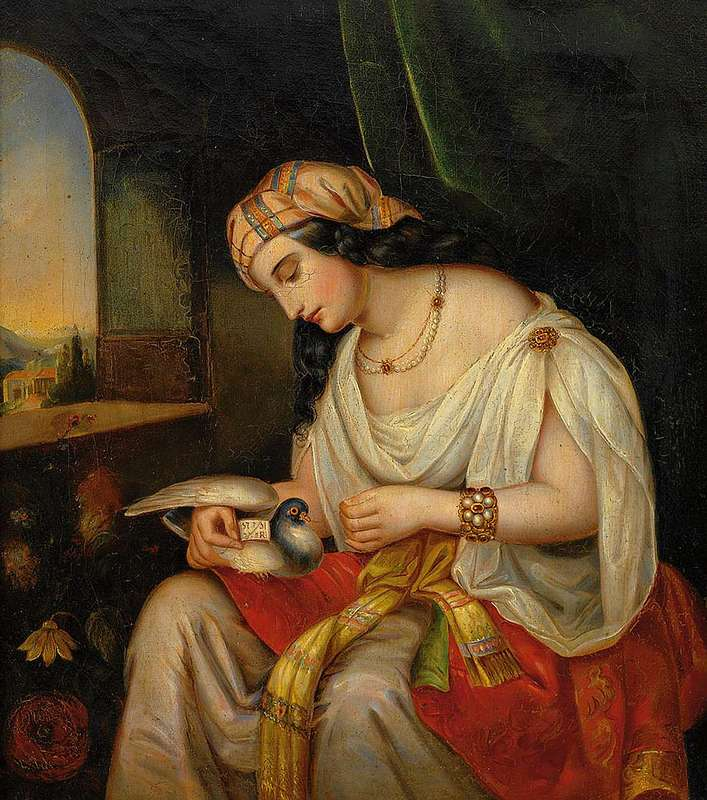
Young lady in oriental clothing with a homing pigeon (19th century painting)

Pigeon post is the use of homing pigeons to carry messages. Pigeons are effective as messengers due to their natural homing abilities. The pigeons are transported to a destination in cages, where they are attached with messages, then the pigeon naturally flies back to its home where the recipient could read the message. They have been used in many places around the world. Pigeons have also been used to great effect in military situations, and are in this case referred to as war pigeons.

== Early history ==
As a method of communication, it is likely as old as the ancient Persians, from whom the art of training the birds probably came. The Romans used pigeon messengers to aid their military over 2000 years ago. Frontinus said that Julius Caesar used pigeons as messengers in his conquest of Gaul. The Greeks conveyed the names of the victors at the Olympic Games to their various cities by this means.

Naval chaplain Henry Teonge (c. 1620–1690) describes in his diary a regular pigeon postal service being used by merchants between İskenderun and Aleppo in the Levant. The Mughals also used messenger pigeons.

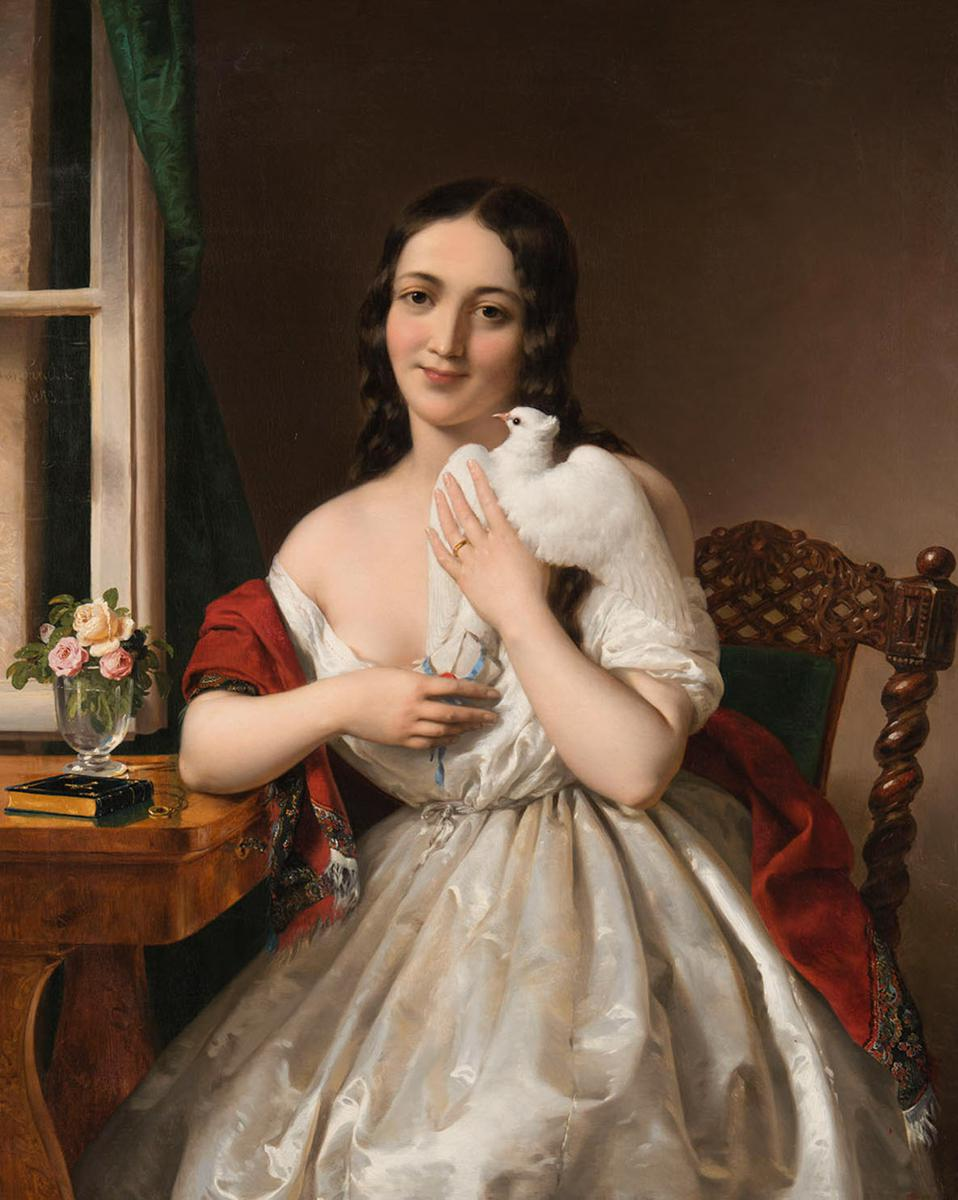
Pigeon post (1843 painting by Miklós Barabás)

Before the telegraph, this method of communication was used extensively in the financial field. The Dutch government established a civil and military system in Java and Sumatra early in the 19th century, the birds being obtained from Baghdad. In 1851, the German-born Paul Julius Reuter opened an office in the City of London which transmitted stock market quotations between London and Paris via the new Calais to Dover cable. Reuter had previously used pigeons to fly stock prices between Aachen and Brussels, a service that operated for a year until a gap in the telegraph link was closed.

Details of the employment of pigeons during the siege of Paris in 1870–71 led to a revival in the training of pigeons for military purposes. Numerous societies were established for keeping pigeons of this class in all important European countries; and, in time, various governments established systems of communication for military purposes by pigeon post. After the pigeon post between military fortresses had been thoroughly tested, attention was turned to its use for naval purposes, to send messages to ships in nearby waters. It was also used by news agencies and private individuals at various times. Governments in several countries established lofts of their own. Laws were passed making the destruction of such pigeons a serious offense; premiums to stimulate efficiency were offered to private societies, and rewards given for the destruction of birds of prey. Before the advent of radio, pigeons were used by newspapers to report yacht races, and some yachts were actually fitted with lofts.

During the establishment of formal pigeon post services, the registration of all birds was introduced. At the same time, in order to hinder the efficiency of the systems of foreign countries, difficulties were placed in the way of the importation of their birds for training, and in a few cases falcons were specially trained to interrupt the service during war, the Germans having set the example by employing hawks against the Paris pigeons in 1870–71. No satisfactory method of protecting the weaker birds seems to have been developed, though the Chinese formerly provided their pigeons with whistles and bells to scare away birds of prey.

As radio telegraphy and telephony were developed, the use of pigeons became limited to fortress warfare by the 1910s. Although the British Admiralty had attained a very high standard of efficiency, it discontinued its pigeon service in the early 20th century. In contrast, large numbers of birds were still kept by France, Germany and Russia at the outbreak of the First World War.

In modern days, some rafting photographers still use pigeons as a sneakernet to transport digital photos on flash media from the camera to the tour operator.

== Paris ==
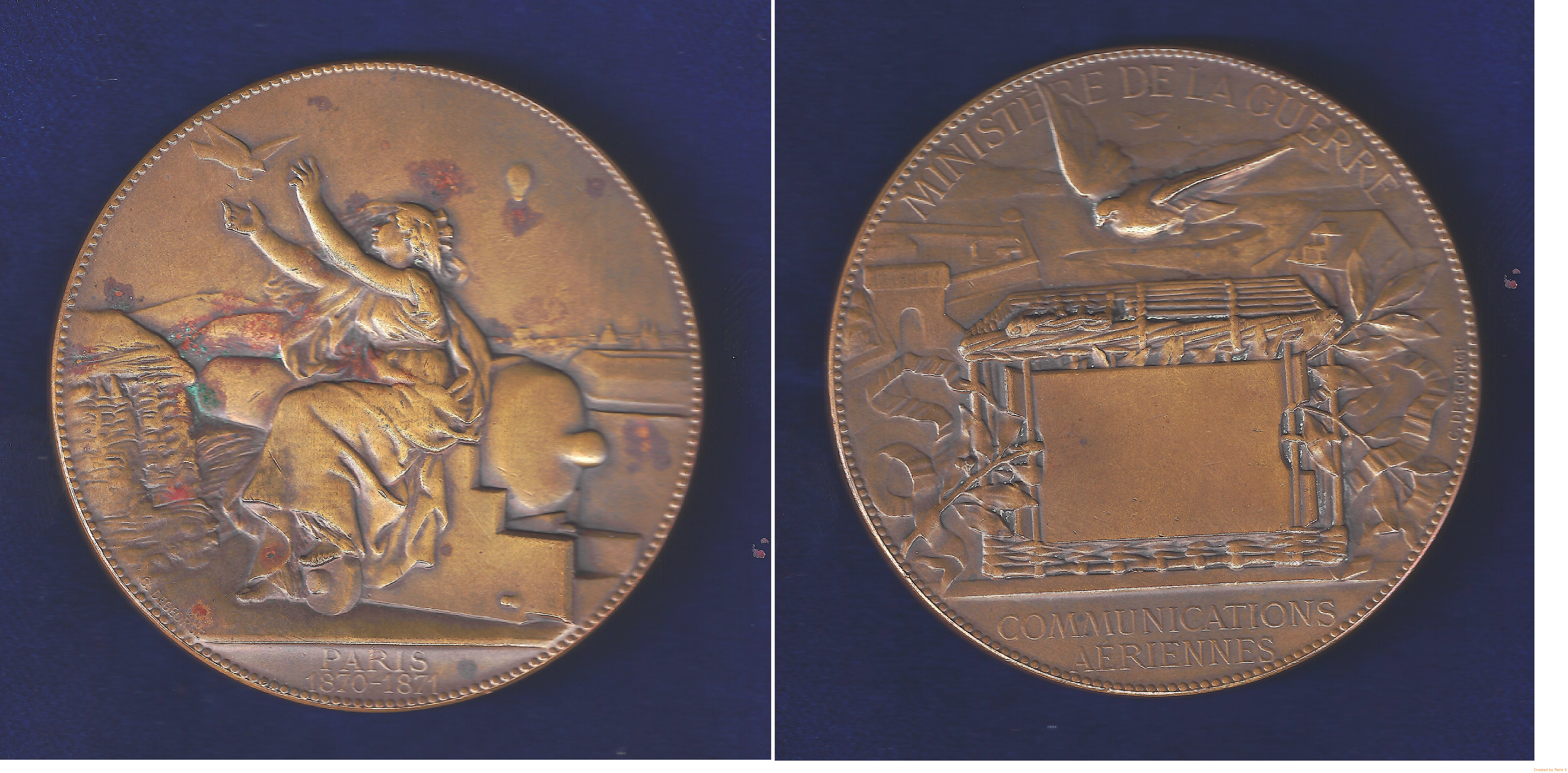
Siege of Paris 1870–1871, pigeon post medal by the artist Charles Degeorge

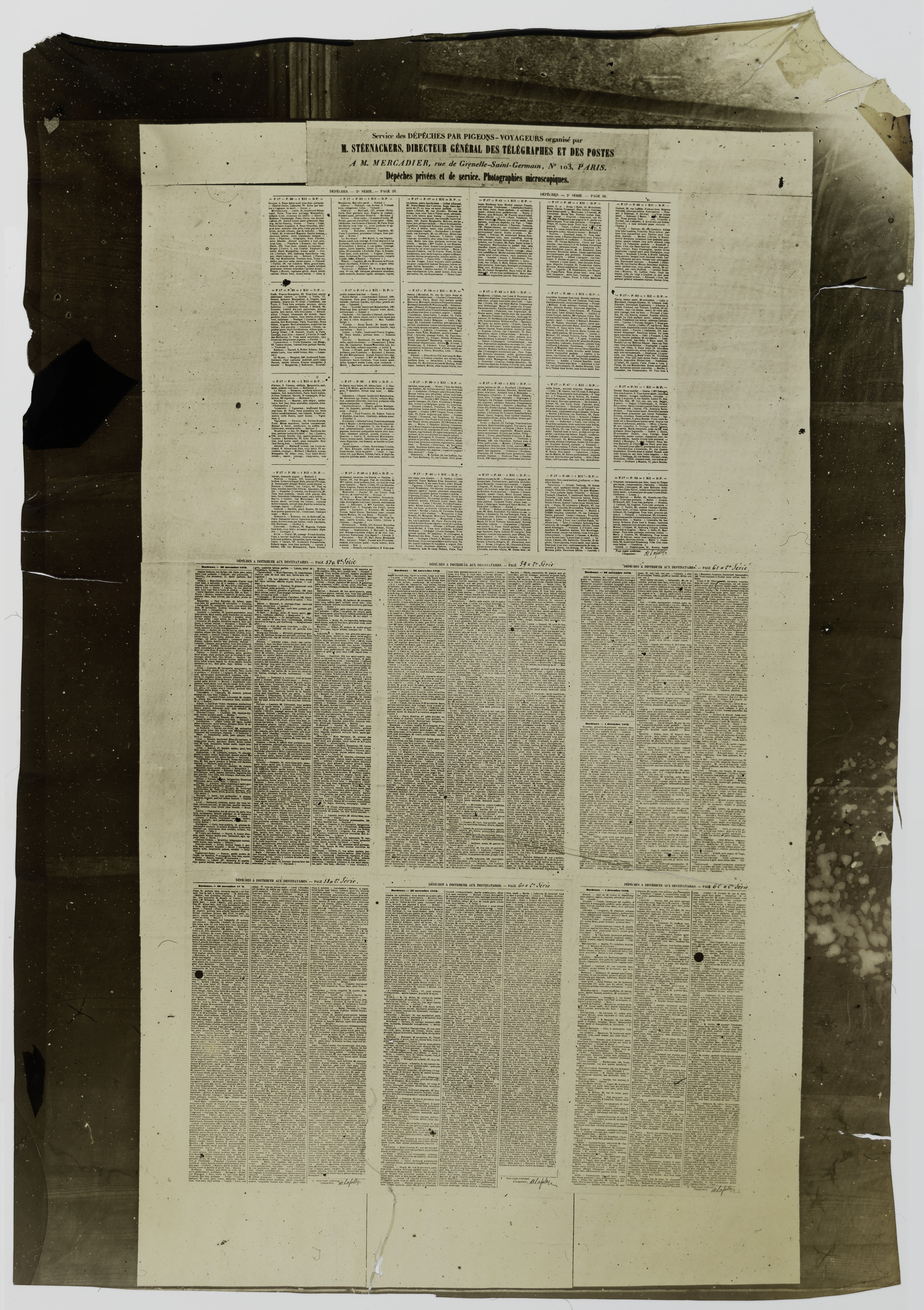
Dispatches (service des dépêches par pigeons voyageurs) connecting the French communication lines during the Siege of Paris in the Franco-Prussian War, 1870–1871. (Smithsonian National Postal Museum)

The pigeon post that was in operation while Paris was besieged during the Franco-Prussian War of 1870–1871 is probably the most famous. Barely six weeks after the outbreak of hostilities, the Emperor Napoleon III and the French Army of Châlons surrendered at Sedan on 2 September 1870. There were two immediate consequences: the fall of the Second Empire and the swift Prussian advance on Paris. As had been expected, the normal channels of communication into and out of Paris were interrupted during the four-and-a-half months of the siege, and, indeed, it was not until the middle of February 1871 that the Prussians relaxed their control of the postal and telegraph services. With the encirclement of the city on 18 September, the last overhead telegraph wires were cut on the morning of 19 September, and the secret telegraph cable in the bed of the Seine was located and cut on 27 September. Although a number of postmen succeeded in passing through the Prussian lines in the earliest days of the siege, others were captured and shot, and there is no proof of any post, certainly after October, reaching Paris from the outside, apart from private letters carried by unofficial individuals. For an assured communication into Paris, the only successful method was by the time-honoured carrier pigeon, and thousands of messages, official and private, were thus taken into the besieged city.

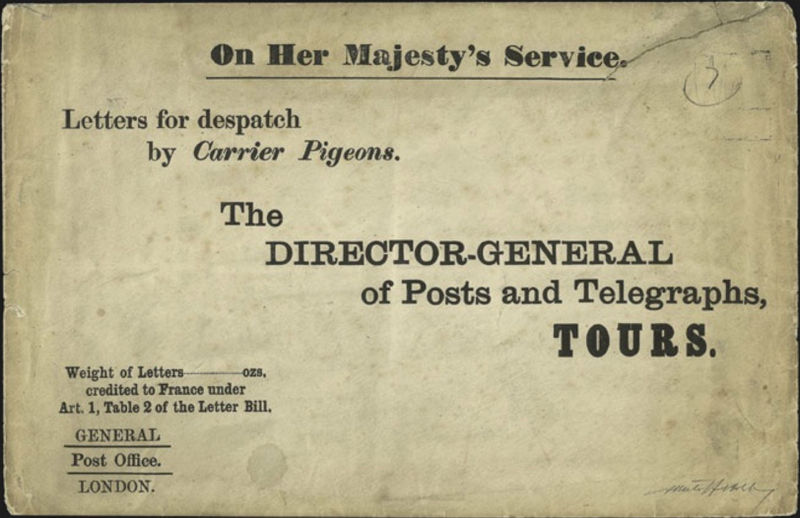
Cover that contained mail to be sent by pigeon post

During the course of the siege, pigeons were regularly taken out of Paris by balloon. Initially, one of the pigeons carried by a balloon was released as soon as the balloon landed so that Paris could be apprised of its safe passage over the Prussian lines. Soon a regular service was in operation, based first at Tours and later at Poitiers. The pigeons were taken to their base after their arrival from Paris and when they had preened themselves, been fed and rested, they were ready for the return journey. Tours lies some 200 km (100 miles) from Paris and Poitiers some 300 km (200 miles); to reduce the flight distance the pigeons were taken by train as far forward towards Paris as was safe from Prussian intervention. Before release, they were loaded with their despatches. The first despatch was dated 27 September and reached Paris on 1 October, but it was only from 16 October, when an official control was introduced, that a complete record was kept.

The pigeons carried two kinds of despatch: official and private, both of which are later described in detail. The service was put into operation for the transmission of information from the Delegation to Paris and was opened to the public in early November. The private despatches were sent only when an official despatch was being sent, since the latter would have absolute priority. However, the introduction of the Dagron microfilms eased any problems there might have been in claims for transport since their volumetric requirements were very small. For example: one tube sent during January contained 21 microfilms, of which 6 were official despatches and 15 were private, while a later tube contained 16 private despatches and 2 official ones. In order to improve the chances of the despatches successfully reaching Paris, the same despatch was sent by several pigeons, one official despatch being repeated 35 times and the later private despatches were repeated on average 22 times. The records show that from 7 January to the end, 61 tubes were sent off, containing 246 official and 671 private despatches. The practice was to send off the despatches not only by pigeons of the same release but also of successive releases until Paris signaled the arrival of those despatches. When the pigeon reached its particular loft in Paris, its arrival was announced by a bell in the trap in the loft. Immediately, a watchman relieved it of its tube which was taken to the Central Telegraph Office where the content was carefully unpacked and placed between two thin sheets of glass. The photographs are said to have been projected by magic lantern on to a screen where the enlargement could be easily read and written down by a team of clerks. This would certainly be true for the microfilms, but the earlier despatches on photographic paper were read through microscopes. The transcribed messages were written out on forms (telegraph forms for private messages, with or without the special annotation "pigeon") and so delivered. The interval between sending a private message and its receipt by the addressee depended on many factors: the density of telegraphic traffic to and from the sender's town, the time taken to register the message, to pass it to the printers where it was assembled with its 3000 companions into a single page, and then to assemble the pages into nines or twelves or sixteens. During the four months of the siege, 150,000 official and 1 million private communications were carried into Paris by this method.

The service was formally terminated on 1 February 1871. In fact, the last pigeons were released on 1 and 3 February. The pigeons that were still alive were now official property and were sold at the Depot du Mobilier de l'Etat. Their value as racing pigeons was reflected by the average price of only 1 franc 50 centimes, but two pigeons, reported to have made three journeys, were purchased by an enthusiast for 26 francs.

The success of the pigeon post, both for official and for private messages, did not pass unnoticed by the military forces of the European powers and in the years that followed the Franco-Prussian War pigeon sections were established in their armies. The advent of wireless communication led to rising pigeon unemployment, although in certain particular applications pigeons provided the only method of communication. But never again were pigeons called upon to perform such a tremendous public service as that which they had maintained during the siege of Paris.

== Canada ==
Major-General Donald Roderick Cameron, then Commandant of the Royal Military College of Canada in Kingston, Ontario recommended an international pigeon service for marine search and rescue and military service in a paper entitled "Messenger Pigeons, a National Question". Sir Charles Hibbert Tupper, then Minister of Marine and Fisheries supported the pigeon policy. Colonel Goldie, Assistant Adjutant General and Major Waldron of the Royal Artillery, and Captain Dopping-Hepenstal of the Royal Engineers carried through the plan. The pigeon post between look-out stations at lighthouses on islands and the mainland at the citadel in Halifax, Nova Scotia provided a messenger service from 1891 until it was discontinued in 1895. The pigeon post faced a heavy mortality among the pigeons as many were lost on the operations. The flight from the Citadel in Halifax, Nova Scotia to Sable Island, for example, was difficult for the pigeons to complete.

== Catalina Island ==
From 1894 to 1898 pigeons carried mail from Avalon across the Santa Barbara Channel to Los Angeles. Two pigeon fanciers, brothers Otto J. and O. F. Zahn, reached an agreement with Western Union where it would not build a telegraph line to the isolated island so long as the pigeons did not compete with it on the mainland. Fifty birds were trained, carrying three copies of each message because of the danger of hunters and predators. They made the 48-mile passage in about one hour, bringing letters, news clippings from the Los Angeles Times, and emergency summons for doctors. In three seasons of operation only two letters failed to come through, but at $.50 to $1.00 per message the service was not profitable, and in 1898 the Zahn brothers ended the post.

== Great Barrier Island (New Zealand) ==
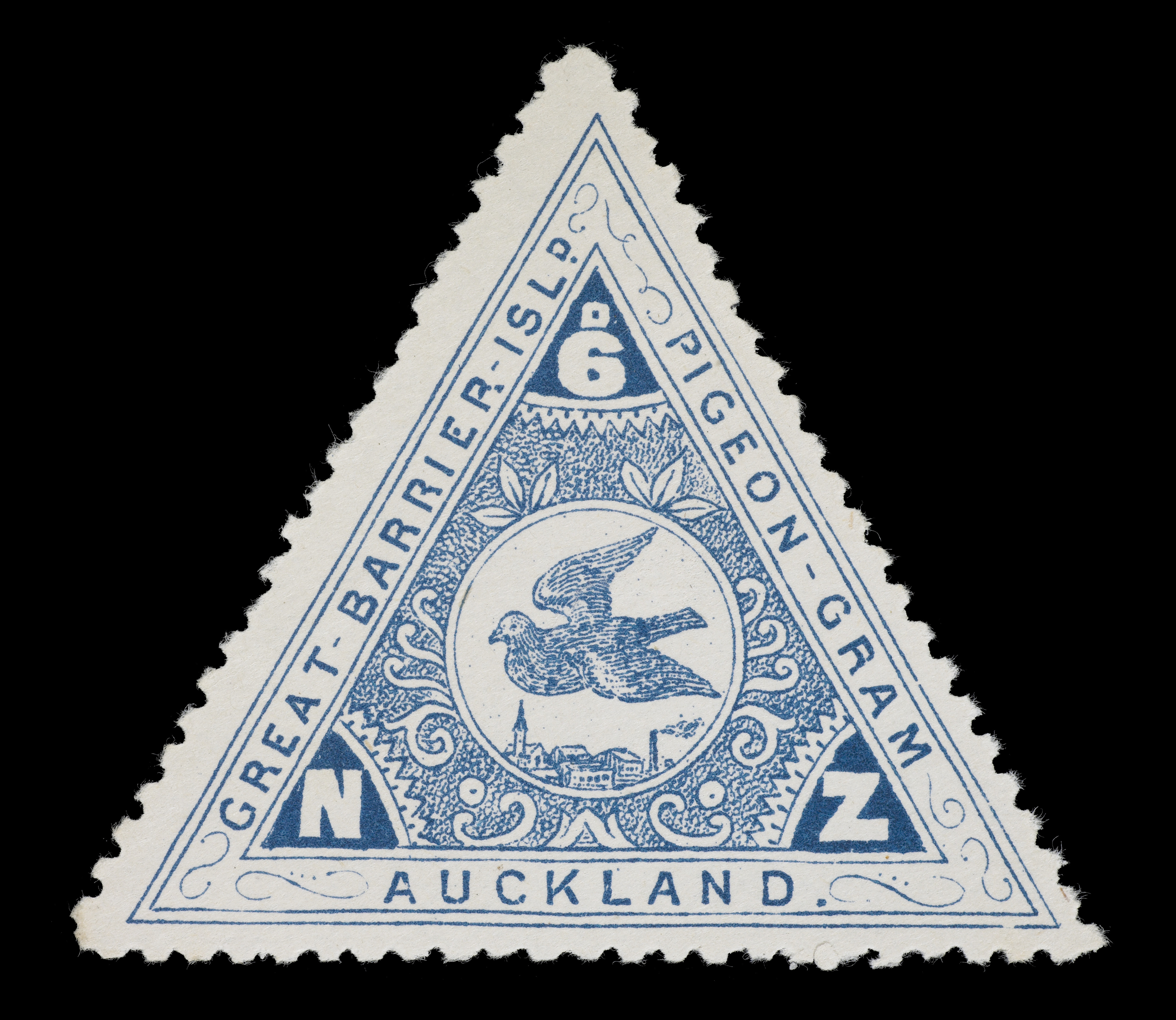
Stamp for early Pigeon-Gram service on Great Barrier Island

Before the pigeon post service was established the only regular connection between the community on Great Barrier Island (90 kilometres northeast of Auckland) and the mainland was provided by a weekly coastal steamer. The island's isolation was highlighted when the ship SS Wairarapa was wrecked off its coast in 1894, with the loss of 121 lives, and the news took several days to reach the mainland.

The pigeon post service began between the island and Auckland in 1897. Soon there were two rival pigeongram companies, both of which issued distinctive and attractive stamps. The stamps have been eagerly collected for their novelty value, and some have become extremely rare.

Initially, the service operated only from Great Barrier Island to Auckland, the reverse route being considered uneconomic. On the island, pigeongram agencies were established at Port Fitzroy, Okupu, and Whangaparara. Birds were sent over to the island on the weekly steamer and flew back to Auckland with up to five messages per bird written on lightweight writing stock and attached to their legs. Great Barrier Island's pigeongram service ended when the first telegraph cable was laid between the island and the mainland in 1908.

== India ==
The Orissa police in India have established regular pigeon posts at Cuttack, Chatrapur, Kendrapara, Sambalpur and Denkanal and these pigeons rose to the occasion in times of emergencies and natural calamities. During the centenary celebrations of the Indian postal service in 1954, the Orissa police pigeons demonstrated their capacity by conveying the message of inauguration from the President of India to the Prime Minister. The last of the pigeon post services in the world (the one in Cuttack, India) was closed in 2008, although about 150 pigeons continue to be maintained for ceremonial purposes in Cuttack and at the Police Training College in Angul.

== See also ==
- IP over Avian Carriers
- Pigeon photography
