= Homing pigeon =

Pigeons bred to find their way home

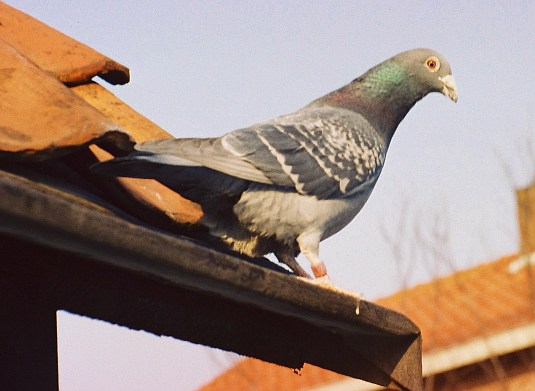
A messenger pigeon on a house roof

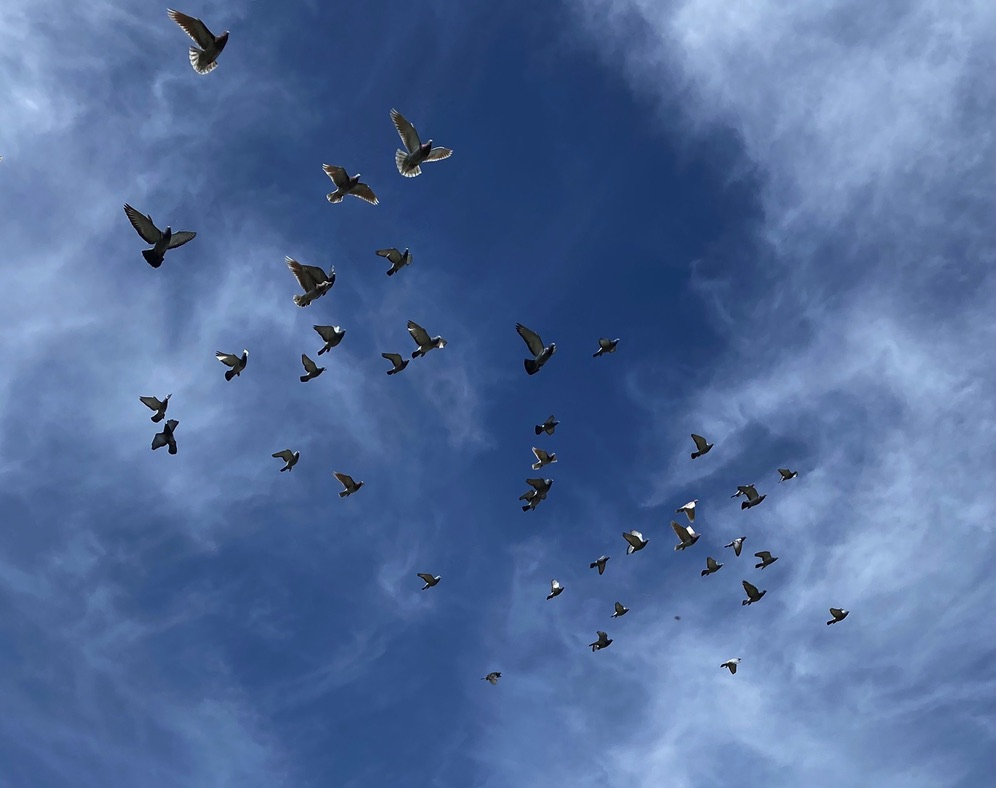
A group of homing pigeons in flight

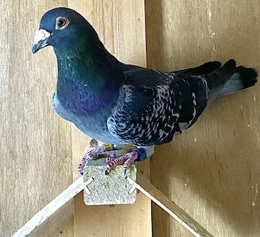
A modern day racing pigeon wearing an electronic timing ring

The homing pigeon is a variety of domestic pigeon (Columba livia domestica), selectively bred for its ability to find its way home over extremely long distances. Because of this skill, homing pigeons were used to carry messages, a practice referred to as "pigeon post." Until the introduction of telephones, they were used commercially to deliver communication; when used during wars, they were called "war pigeons."

The homing pigeon is also called a mail pigeon or messenger, and colloquially a homer. Perhaps most commonly, the homing pigeon is called a carrier pigeon; this nomenclature can be confusing, though, since it is distinct from the English carrier, an ancient breed of fancy pigeon. Modern-day homing pigeons do have English carrier blood in them because they are in part descendants of the old-style carriers.

The domestic pigeon is derived from the wild rock dove (Columba livia sspp.); the rock dove has an innate homing ability, meaning that it will generally return to its nest using magnetoreception. Flights as long as 1,800 km (1,100 miles) have been recorded by birds in competitive homing pigeon racing; birds bred for this are colloquially called racing homers. Homing pigeons' average flying speed over moderate 965 km (600 miles) distances is around 97 km/h (60 miles per hour) and speeds of up to 160 km/h (100 miles per hour) have been observed in top racers for short distances.

== History ==
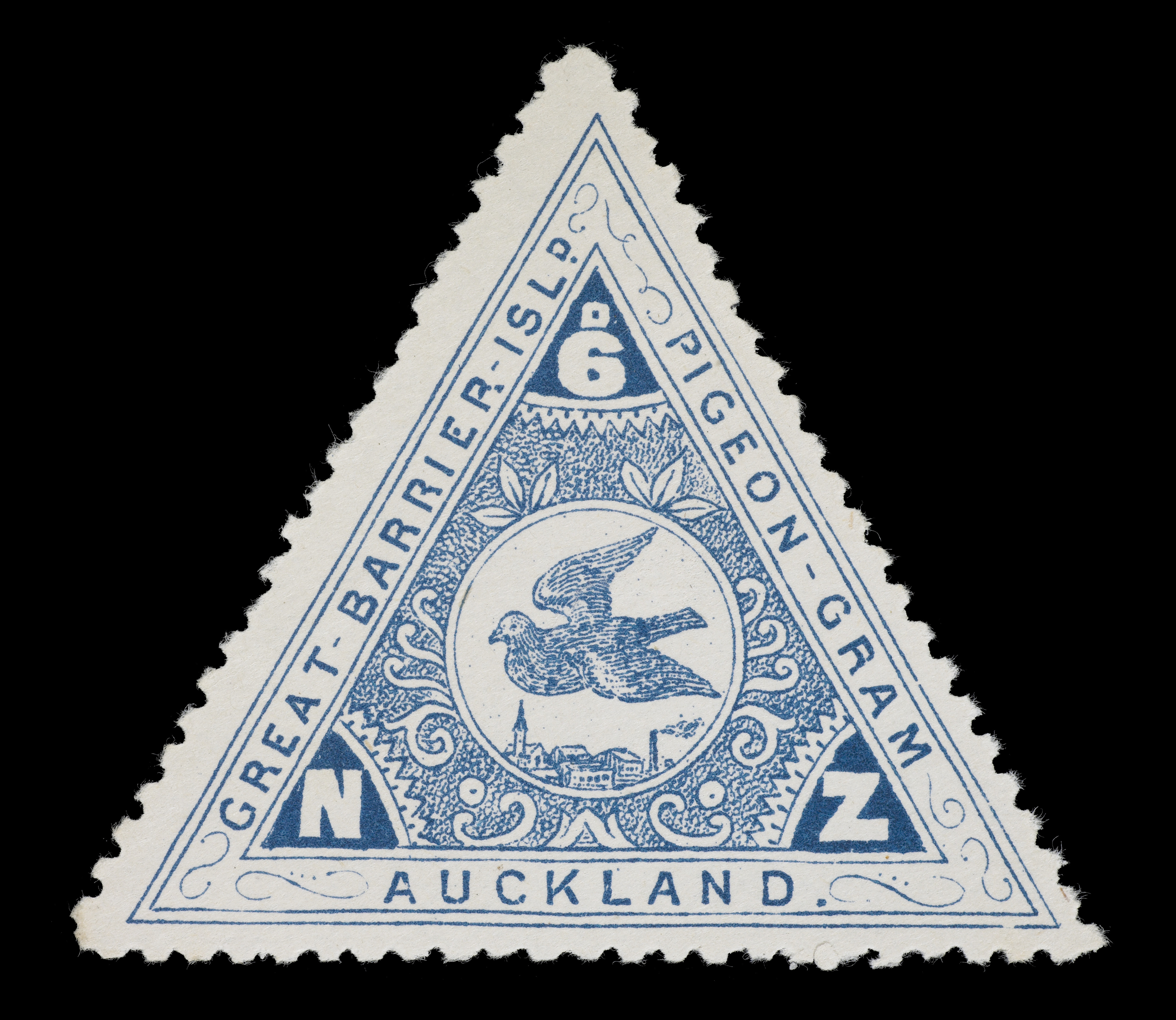
Stamp for Pigeon-Gram Service on Great Barrier Island in New Zealand (1899)

Evidence exists suggesting that homing pigeons were used for pigeon post in Ancient Egypt by 1350 BCE. Messages were tied around the legs of the pigeon, which was freed and could reach its original nest. Pliny the Elder described pigeons used in a similar fashion as military messengers around the first century CE. By the 19th century homing pigeons were used extensively for military communications.

The use of flying messenger pigeons was well-established as early as 3000 years ago. They were used to proclaim the winner of the Ancient Olympics. Messenger pigeons were used as early as 1150 in Baghdad and also later by Genghis Khan. By 1167 a regular service between Baghdad and Syria had been established by Sultan Nur ad-Din. In Damietta, by the mouth of the Nile, the Spanish traveller Pedro Tafur saw carrier pigeons for the first time, in 1436, though he imagined that the birds made round trips, out and back. The Republic of Genoa equipped their system of watch towers in the Mediterranean Sea with pigeon posts. Tipu Sultan of Mysore (1750–1799) also used messenger pigeons; they returned to the Jamia Masjid mosque in Srirangapatna, which was his headquarters. The pigeon holes may be seen in the mosque's minarets to this day.

A great pigeon race called the Cannonball Run took place at Brussels in 1818. Pigeon post was rare before the 1820s. In 1860, Paul Reuter, who later founded Reuters press agency, used a fleet of over 45 pigeons to deliver news and stock prices between Brussels and Aachen, the terminus of early telegraph lines. During the Franco-Prussian War pigeons were used to carry mail between besieged Paris and the French unoccupied territory. In December 1870, it took ten hours for a pigeon carrying microfilms to fly from Perpignan to Brussels.

Historically, pigeons carried messages only one way, to their home. They had to be transported manually before another flight. However, by placing their food at one location and their home at another location, pigeons have been trained to fly back and forth up to twice a day reliably, covering round-trip flights up to 160 km (100 mi). Their reliability has lent itself to occasional use on mail routes, such as the Great Barrier Pigeongram Service established between the Auckland, New Zealand, suburb of Newton and Great Barrier Island in November 1897, possibly the first regular air mail service in the world. The world's first "airmail" stamps were issued for the Great Barrier Pigeon-Gram Service from 1898 to 1908.

In the 19th century, newspapers sometimes used carrier pigeons. To get news from Europe quicker, some New York City newspapers used carrier pigeons. The distance from Europe to Halifax, Nova Scotia, is relatively short. So reporters stationed themselves in Halifax, wrote the information received from incoming ships, and put the messages in capsules attached to the legs of homing pigeons. The birds would then fly from Halifax to New York City where the information would be published.

The Swiss army stopped using pigeons in 1994. The military had used pigeons for 77 years and said it planned to train 12 of the 30,000 birds to compete on the European racing circuit. The rest were likely to "end up dead on people's dinner tables".

Homing pigeons were still employed in the 21st century by certain remote police departments in Odisha state in eastern India to provide emergency communication services following natural disasters. In March 2002, it was announced that India's Police Pigeon Service messenger system in Odisha was to be retired, due to the expanded use of the Internet. The Taliban banned the keeping or use of pigeons, including racing pigeons, in Afghanistan in the late 1990s.

As of 2018, pigeons were still entered into competitions.

== Navigation ==
Research has been performed with the intention of discovering how pigeons, after being transported, can find their way back from distant places they have never visited before. Most researchers believe that homing ability is based on a "map and compass" model, with the compass feature allowing birds to orient and the map feature allowing birds to determine their location relative to a goal site (home loft). While the compass mechanism appears to rely on the sun, the map mechanism has been highly debated.

A prominent theory is that the birds are able to detect a magnetic field to help them find their way home. Scientific research previously suggested that on top of a pigeon's beak a large number of iron particles are found which remain aligned to Earth's magnetic north like a natural compass, thus acting as a compass that helps the pigeon determine its home. However, a 2012 study disproved this theory, putting the field back on course to search for an explanation as to how animals detect magnetic fields.

A light-mediated mechanism that involves the eyes and is lateralized has been examined somewhat, but developments have implicated the trigeminal nerve in magnetoreception. Research by Floriano Papi (Italy, early 1970s) and more recent work, largely by Hans Wallraff, suggest that pigeons also orient themselves using the spatial distribution of atmospheric odors, known as olfactory navigation.

Other research indicates that homing pigeons also navigate through visual landmarks by following familiar roads and other human-made features, making 90-degree turns and following habitual routes, much the same way that humans navigate.

Research by Jon Hagstrum of the US Geological Survey suggests that homing pigeons use low-frequency infrasound to navigate. Sound waves as low as 0.1 Hz have been observed to disrupt or redirect pigeon navigation. The pigeon ear, being far too small to interpret such a long wave, directs pigeons to fly in a circle when first taking air, in order to mentally map such long infrasound waves.

Various experiments suggest that different breeds of homing pigeons rely on different cues to different extents. Charles Walcott at Cornell University was able to demonstrate that while pigeons from one loft were confused by a magnetic anomaly in the Earth, it had no effect on birds from another loft 1.6 km (1 mile) away. Other experiments have shown that altering the perceived time of day with artificial lighting or using air conditioning to eliminate odors in the pigeons' home roost affected the pigeons' ability to return home.

GPS tracing studies indicate that gravitational anomalies may play a role as well.

== Roles ==
=== Postal carriage ===
A message may be written on thin light paper, rolled into a small tube, and attached to a messenger pigeon's leg. They will only travel to one "mentally marked" point that they have identified as their home, so "pigeon post" can only work when the sender is actually holding the receiver's pigeons.

With training, pigeons can carry up to 75 g (2.5 oz) on their backs. As early as 1903, the German apothecary Julius Neubronner used carrier pigeons to both receive and deliver urgent medication. In 1977, a similar system of 30 carrier pigeons was set up for the transport of laboratory specimens between two English hospitals. Every morning a basket with pigeons was taken from Plymouth General Hospital to Devonport Hospital. The birds then delivered unbreakable vials back to Plymouth as needed. The carrier pigeons became unnecessary in 1983 because of the closure of one of the hospitals. In the 1980s a similar system existed between two French hospitals located in Granville and Avranche.

=== Wartime communication ===
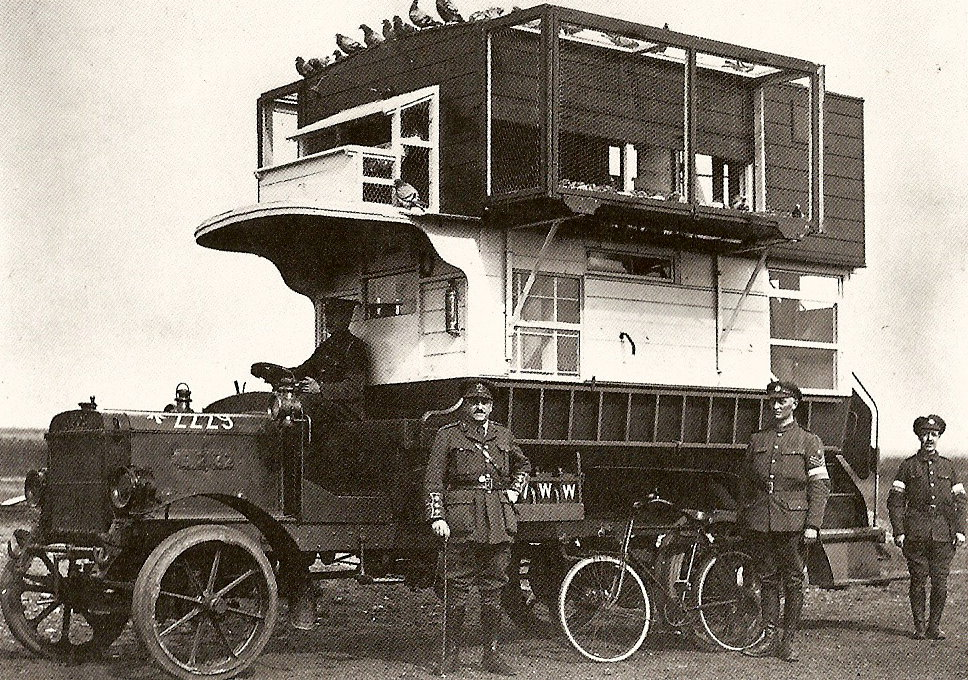
A B-type bus from London converted into a pigeon loft for use in northern France and Belgium during the First World War

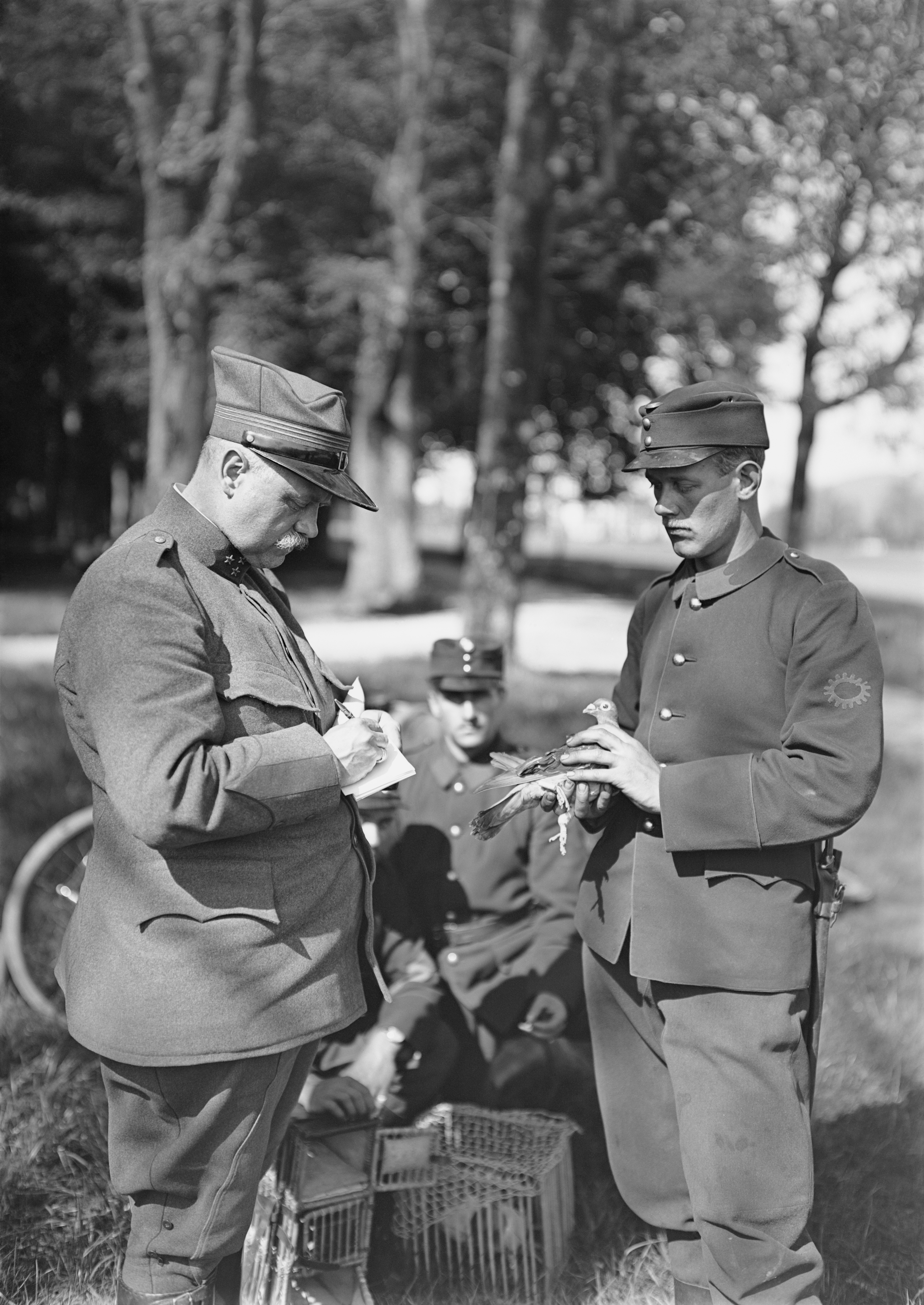
Dispatching of a message by carrier pigeon within the Swiss Army during World War I

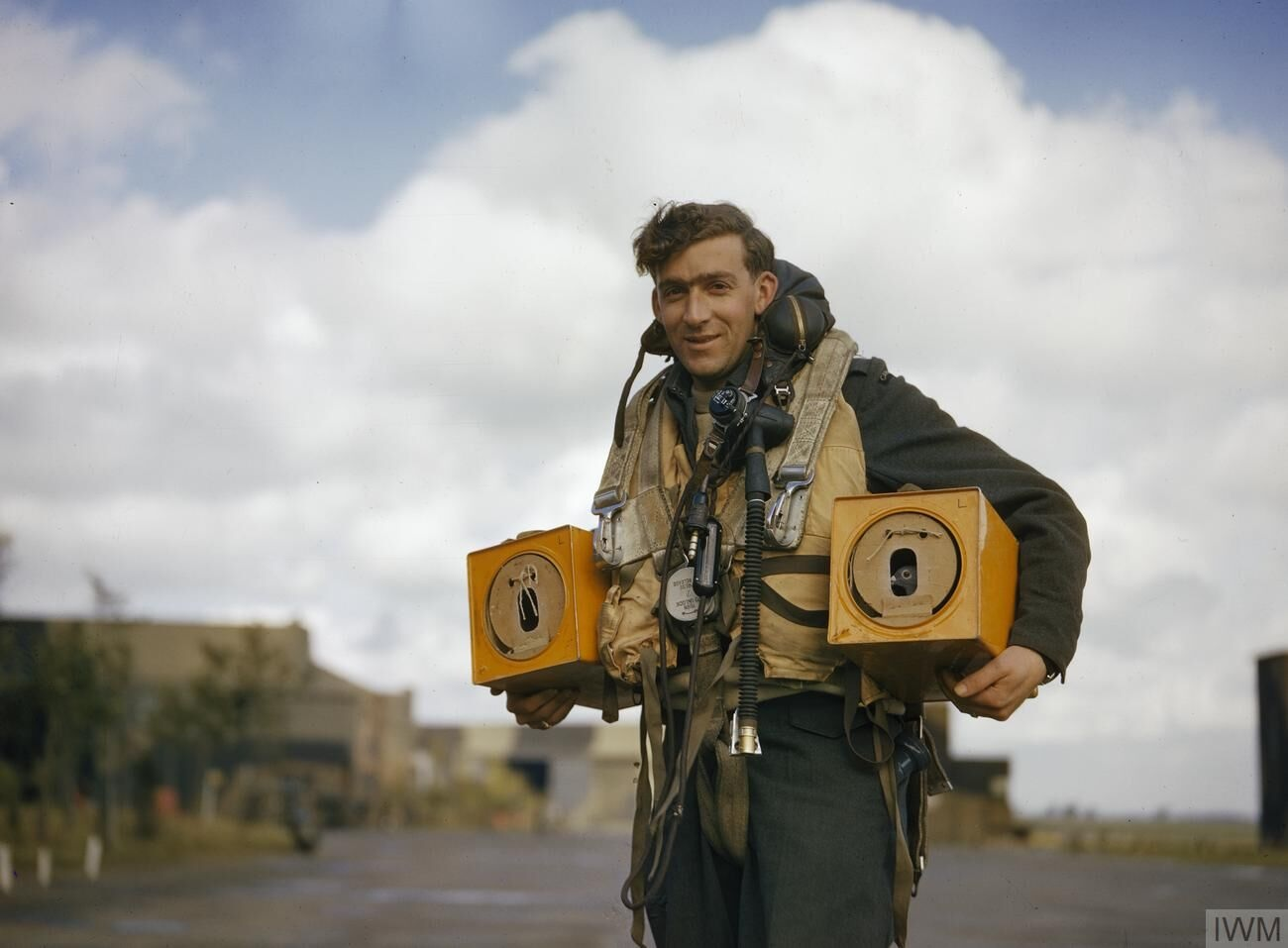
Crewman of an RAF Bomber with homing pigeons nestled in niches as a means of emergency communications in the event of a crash, ditching, or radio failure

Birds were used extensively during World War I. One homing pigeon, Cher Ami, was awarded the French Croix de guerre for his heroic service in delivering 12 important messages, despite having been very badly injured. "Cher Ami and Major Whittlesey" is a book which captures the heroism of this remarkable pigeon. Similarly, "Operation Columba: The Secret Pigeon Service" is a book about avian courage during WWII, as is "The Long Flight Home." In the novel "A Pigeon and a Boy," by Israeli writer Meir Shalev, a pigeon plays a crucial role for a soldier in Israel's War of Independence, with a play between the word "homing" pigeon, and the book's focus on the importance of "home."

During World War II, the Irish Paddy, the American G.I. Joe and the English Mary of Exeter all received the Dickin Medal. They were among 32 pigeons to receive this award, for their gallantry and bravery in saving human lives with their actions. Eighty-two homing pigeons were dropped into the Netherlands with the First Airborne Division Signals as part of Operation Market Garden in World War II. The pigeons' loft was located in London, which would have required them to fly 390 km (240 miles) to deliver their messages. Also in World War II, hundreds of homing pigeons with the Confidential Pigeon Service were airdropped into northwest Europe to serve as intelligence vectors for local resistance agents. Birds played a vital part in the Invasion of Normandy as radios could not be used for fear of vital information being intercepted by the enemy.

During the Second World War, the use of pigeons for sending messages was highlighted in Britain by the Princesses Elizabeth and Margaret as Girl Guides joining other Guides sending messages to the World Chief Guide in 1943, as part of a campaign to raise money for homing pigeons.

=== Computing ===
The humorous IP over Avian Carriers (RFC 1149) is an Internet protocol for the transmission of messages via homing pigeon. Originally intended as an April Fools' Day RFC entry, this protocol was implemented and used, once, to transmit a message in Bergen, Norway, on 28 April 2001.

In September 2009, a South African IT company based in Durban pitted an 11-month-old bird armed with a data-packed 4 GB memory stick against the ADSL service from the country's biggest Internet service provider, Telkom. The pigeon, Winston, took an hour and eight minutes to carry the data 80 km (50 miles). In all, the data transfer took two hours, six minutes, and fifty-seven seconds—the same amount of time it took to transfer 4% of the data over the ADSL.

=== Smuggling ===
Homing pigeons have been reported to be used as a smuggling technique, getting objects and narcotics across borders and into prisons. For instance, between 2009 and 2015, pigeons have been reported to carry contraband items such as mobile phones, SIM cards, phone batteries and USB cords into prisons in the Brazilian state of São Paulo. There have also been cases where homing pigeons were used to transport drugs into prisons.

== See also ==
- List of pigeon breeds
- American Show Racer
- Dovecote
- Pigeon intelligence
- Pigeon photography
- Tippler
- Otto J. Zahn
