= RKG =

RKG may refer to:

- Reichskammergericht, Imperial chamber court of the Holy Roman Empire
- Reichskriegsgericht, German military law
- RKG-3 anti-tank grenade
- RK Gorenje (Gorenje Velenje Handball Club), a team handball club from Velenje, Slovenia
