= Alfred Maul =

German engineer

Alfred Maul (1870–1942) was a German engineer who could be thought of as the father of aerial reconnaissance. Maul, who owned a machine works, experimented from 1900 with small solid-propellant sounding rockets.

== Background ==
Although people had long been experimenting with rockets, hardly anyone had used them in a practical application. It was Alfred Maul, an industrialist and engineer born in Pößneck, in the Duchy of Saxe-Meiningen, that thought of, and implemented, the idea of taking photographs of the land with a rocket-attached camera. He was inspired by Ludwig Rahrmann, who in 1891 patented a means of attaching a camera to a large calibre artillery projectile or rocket. Previously, aerial photographs had been taken from balloons and kites, and in 1896 or 1897 by Alfred Nobel's rocket, from a small rocket at 100 metres altitude. In 1903 Julius Neubronner's pigeons were used to take aerial photos but found to be too unreliable.

== Camera rocket development ==
In 1903, Alfred Maul patented his Maul Camera Rocket. The camera would be launched into the air with a black powder rocket. When the rocket had reached an altitude of about 600 to 800 meters, a few seconds later, its top would spring open and the camera would descend on a parachute. A timer would trigger the taking of the photograph.

In 1904, Maul managed to image the local landscape from a 600-metre altitude.

A military application for Maul's technique was intended and, on 22 August 1906, a secret demonstration occurred before military observers at the Glauschnitz firing range. Maul developed his camera rocket further for the purpose of military reconnaissance. He began attaching gyroscopic-stabilized plate cameras in 1907.

In 1912, his rocket cameras were using a 20 by 25 centimetre photographic plate and gyroscopic steering to ensure stable flight and sharper images. The rocket weighed 41 kilograms.

== Aeroplanes take over ==
Maul's rockets achieved no military significance because conventional aeroplanes during World War I succeeded in the role of aerial reconnaissance. The Deutsches Museum in Munich displays a Maul-built rocket.
