= RKG-3 anti-tank grenade =

Series of Soviet handheld grenades

RKG-3 series
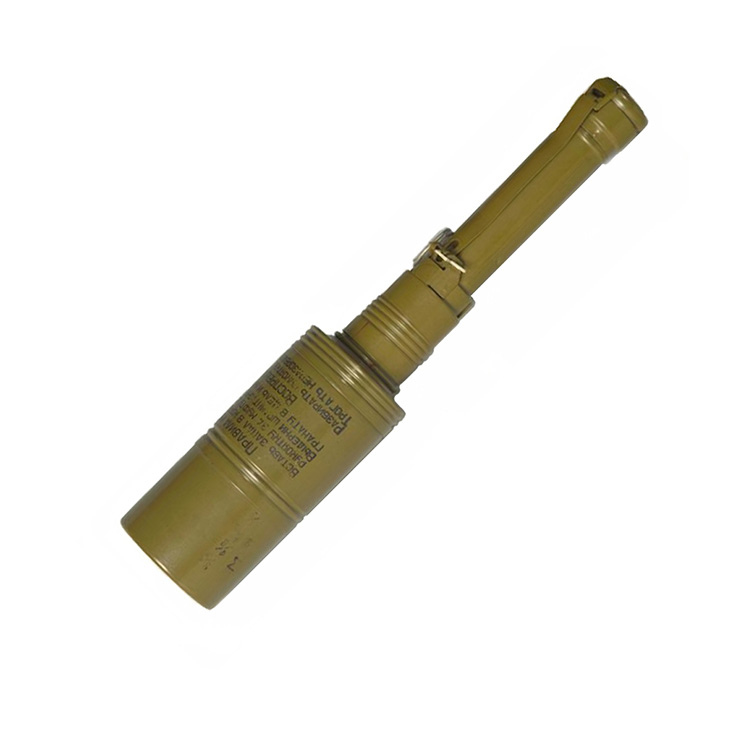
- Type: Anti-tank grenade
- Place of origin: Soviet Union

Service history
- In service: 1950–present
- Used by: See users
- Wars: Arab–Israeli conflict; Yom Kippur War; Vietnam War; Soviet–Afghan War; First Chechen War; War on terror; Iraq War; Russo–Ukrainian War

Specifications
- Mass: 1.07 kg (2.4 lb)
- Length: 362 mm (14.3 in)
- Effective firing range: 15–20 m (49–66 ft)
- Filling: TNT/RDX with a steel lined shaped charge with 220 mm penetration of RHA.
- Filling weight: 567 g (20.0 oz)
- Detonation mechanism: Impact fuse

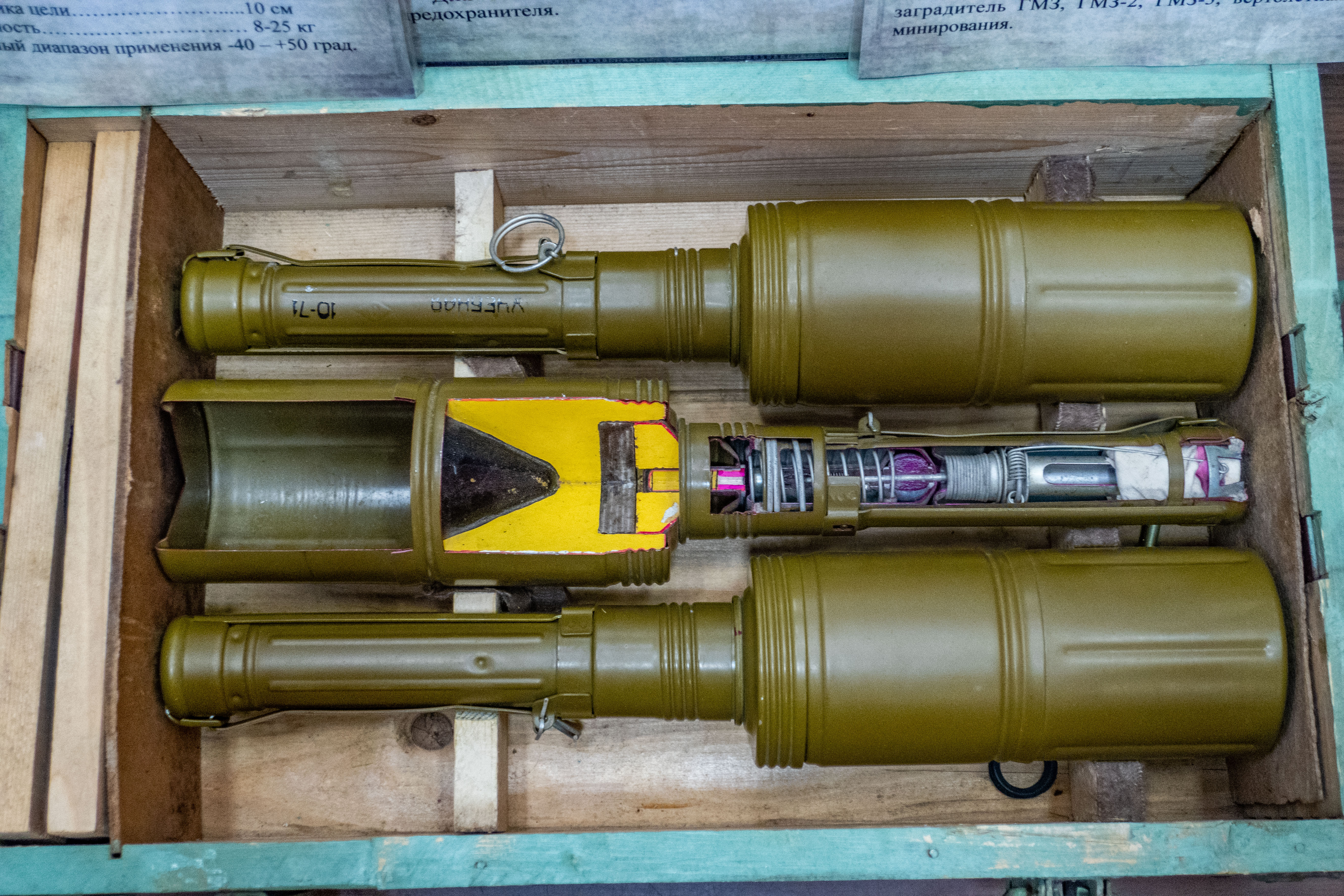
RKG-3E grenades including one grenade cutaway in (DOSAAF Museum, Minsk)

RKG-3 (Russian: Ручная кумулятивная граната-3, romanized: Ruchnaya Kumulyativnaya Granata-3, lit. 'Handheld shaped-charge grenade') is a series of Soviet anti-tank hand grenades.

== Design ==
The RKG-3 grenade has a strap-like lever (or "spoon") that covers the base of the handle and runs up each side of the handle. When the pin is pulled, the "spoon" falls away, and when the grenade is thrown a spring deploys a four-panelled drogue parachute. This parachute stabilizes the grenade in flight and ensures that the grenade strikes the target at a 90-degree angle, maximising the effect of the shaped charge. Realistic accurate throw ranges are within 15 to 25 metres (50 to 80 ft). The lethality radius is within two metres (6.6 ft) due to concussion and fragmentation. The casualty radius is within 20 metres (66 ft) and the danger space from fragmentation is within 50 metres (160 ft).

The fuze in the handle activates the grenade. When the parachute deploys, its ejection throws a weight to the rear of the handle and disables the safety. When it impacts or stops, inertia causes the weight to fly forward and hit the spring-loaded firing pin, which activates the primer detonator in the base. This sets off the booster charge in the base of the shaped charge, detonating and enhancing the main charge. The sensitive fuze guarantees that the grenade will detonate if it impacts any target.

Armour penetration depends on the model. The original RKG-3 used a basic shaped charge with a steel liner and could penetrate 12.5 centimetres (5 in) against Rolled Homogeneous Armor (RHA). The RKG-3M used a copper-lined shaped-charge warhead and had a penetration of 165 mm; the RKG-3T had an improved copper liner that had a penetration of 170 mm. The RKG-3EM has a larger warhead and boasts a penetration of 220 millimetres (8.7 in).

== History ==
The RKG-3 was adopted into Soviet service in 1950, having superseded the RPG-43, RPG-40 and RPG-6 series.

Later, it was replaced by the disposable RPG-18 rocket launcher in 1972, but it saw limited use during the Soviet–Afghan War, mostly for demolishing buildings and destroying enemy equipment.

Other countries made ample use of the RKG-3 series: Viet Cong sappers made use of RKG-3 grenades against bunkers and other fortified positions during the Vietnam War. According to Rottman, these grenades could penetrate almost 1.8 m (6 ft) of hard soil. During the Arab–Israeli conflict, both Egypt and Syria were supplied with RKG-3s, with the former receiving assistance to produce them locally.

Both RKG-3 and RKG-3M grenades were used by Chechen forces against the Russians during the First Chechen War.

=== Iraq War ===
During the Iraq War, the Iraqi insurgency made widespread use of RKG-3 grenades which replaced improvised explosive devices. Their main targets were American Humvees, Strykers and MRAPs.

Insurgents carrying concealed grenades would get close as possible to Coalition vehicles and barricades and throw them in two or three volleys before quickly disappearing amongst the civilian population, though Shea has noted that some of the attackers were killed by standing too close to the fragmentation radius of their own grenades.

=== Russo-Ukrainian War ===
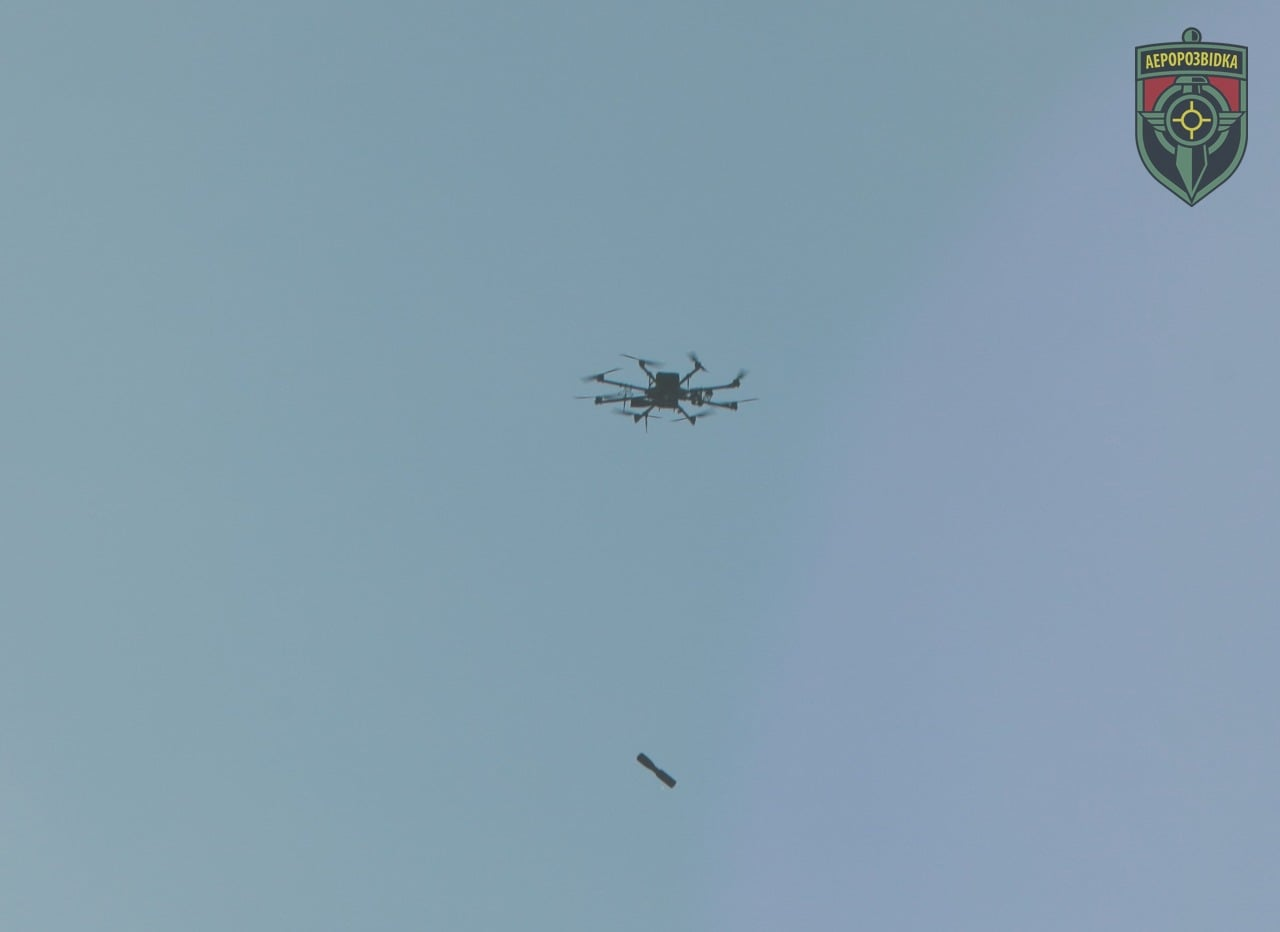
R18 drone dropping an RKG-1600 grenade during testing at the Shyrokyi Lan training area}, Ukraine, 2020

The RKG-3EM saw limited use during the early stages of the Donbas War with some Ukrainian units.

During the Russian invasion of Ukraine, the Aerorozvidka unit of the Ukrainian military in coordination with PJSC Mayak converted the grenade into drone-dropped bomblets, eventually designated as the RKG 1600 by changing the fuze timing and adding 3D printed fins to stabilise its trajectory when dropped from a commercial drone. A training version, designated NI-RKG-1600, was also developed.

Baba Yaga drones can carry up to three grenades, which can penetrate the top armor of all Russian main battle tanks. The estimated total cost per bomblet is "less than $100".

== Variants ==
=== Soviet Union/Russia ===
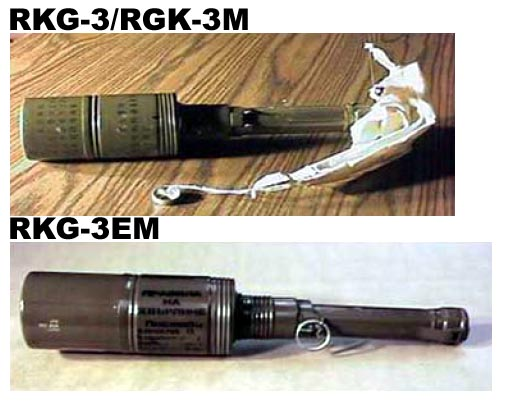
Two grenades, one with the drogue parachute exposed

- RKG-3 − Original version capable of penetrating 125 mm (4.9 in) of RHA, while Rottman gives a figure of 150 mm (5.9 in) of RHA
- RKG-3M − Improved version with a slightly larger warhead and the steel liner replaced with a copper cone. Penetration increased to 165 mm (6.5 in) of RHA
- RKG-3E − Improved model. Penetration is increased to 170 mm (6.7 in) of RHA
- RKG-3EM − Improved model capable of penetrating 220 mm (8.7 in) of RHA
- RKG-T − A designation for an improved model with a modified cone liner used by some sources including Janes
- UPG-8 − Practice variant with a black body with white markings. The warhead have two holes to vent the smoke generated by the simulation fuze if the grenade hits soft soil. All the components except the fuze can be reused multiple times. A new fuze and parachute can be quickly reloaded in the handle after use by using special armorer tools

=== Foreign copies ===
- Type 3 − Chinese copy with simplified design.
- RKG-1600 − Ukrainian adaptation with 3D printed stabilization fins, used on Baba Yaga bomber drones
- NI-RKG 1600 − Training version of the Ukrainian RKG-1600.
- M79 − Yugoslav copy of the RKG-3, filled with 400 g (14 oz) of Hexolite, it has an effective throwing range of 25 m (27 yd), and is capable of penetrating 220 mm (8.7 in) of RHA. Currently produced in Serbia, while Bosnia produces it under the designation RKB-M79

== Users ==
- Afghanistan − RKG-3M
- Bosnia and Herzegovina − RKB-M79
- China − RKG-3
- Egypt
- East Germany − RKG-3, RKG-3M, and RKG-3T
- Hungary − RKG-3, RKG-3M, and RKG-3T
- Iraq − RKG-3, RKG-3M, and RKG-3T
- North Korea − RKG-3, RKG-3M, and RKG-3T
- Poland − RKG-3, RKG-3M, and RKG-T
- Romania − RKG-3
- Russia
- Serbia − M79
- Syria
- Soviet Union
- Ukraine − RKG-3EM, RKG-1600
- North Vietnam
- Yugoslavia − M79

=== Non-state ===
- Chechen Republic of Ichkeria − RKG-3 and RKG-3M
- Iraqi insurgents
- Viet Cong

== See also ==
- List of Russian weaponry
- List of 3D printed weapons and parts
