= Aerorozvidka =

Ukrainian drone warfare unit

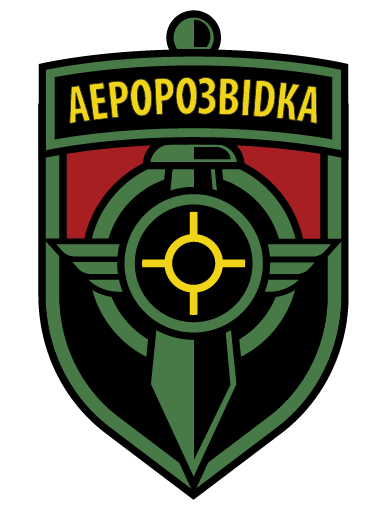
- Formation: First established in 2014, registered in July 13, 2020; 6 years ago
- Founder: Volodymyr Kochetkov-Sukach (killed in 2015)
- Type: Non-governmental organization
- Purpose: To assist Ukrainian security and defense forces in Russo-Ukrainian War
- Region served: Ukraine
- Leader: Yaroslav Honchar (since 2023)
- Website: https://aerorozvidka.ngo/
- Remarks: Areas of activity: unmanned aerial vehicles; situational awareness; cybersecurity.

Aerorozvidka (Ukrainian: Аеророзвідка, "aerial reconnaissance") is a team and NGO that promotes creating and implementing netcentric and robotic military capabilities for the security and defense forces of Ukraine. Aerorozvidka specialises in aerial reconnaissance and drone warfare. It was founded in May 2014 by a team headed by Volodymyr Kochetov-Sukach and including Ukrainian battalion commander Natan Chazin. Kochetkov-Sukach, an investment banker, was killed in 2015 while fighting in the Russo-Ukrainian War. From its beginnings as a group of volunteer drone and IT enthusiasts, Aerorozvidka eventually evolved into a unit of the Armed Forces of Ukraine. It has been termed a "war startup" by the Atlantic Council.

== Foundation ==
When the occupation of Crimea by Russia started in 2014, Natan Khazin, the leader of the "Jewish Regiment" of the Euromaidan and a soldier of the first "Azov" formation, began to look for opportunities for the technical armament of the Ukrainian army. After an unsuccessful trip to Israel, where he was refused help, he turned to his friend from Maidan for assistance. This friend was making panoramic shots from a DJI Phantom drone. The video "Ukraine through the eyes of a drone", which he contributed to, gained over a million views on YouTube. It was with this drone, which he later donated to Ukrainian volunteers, that Aerorozvidka began to take shape.

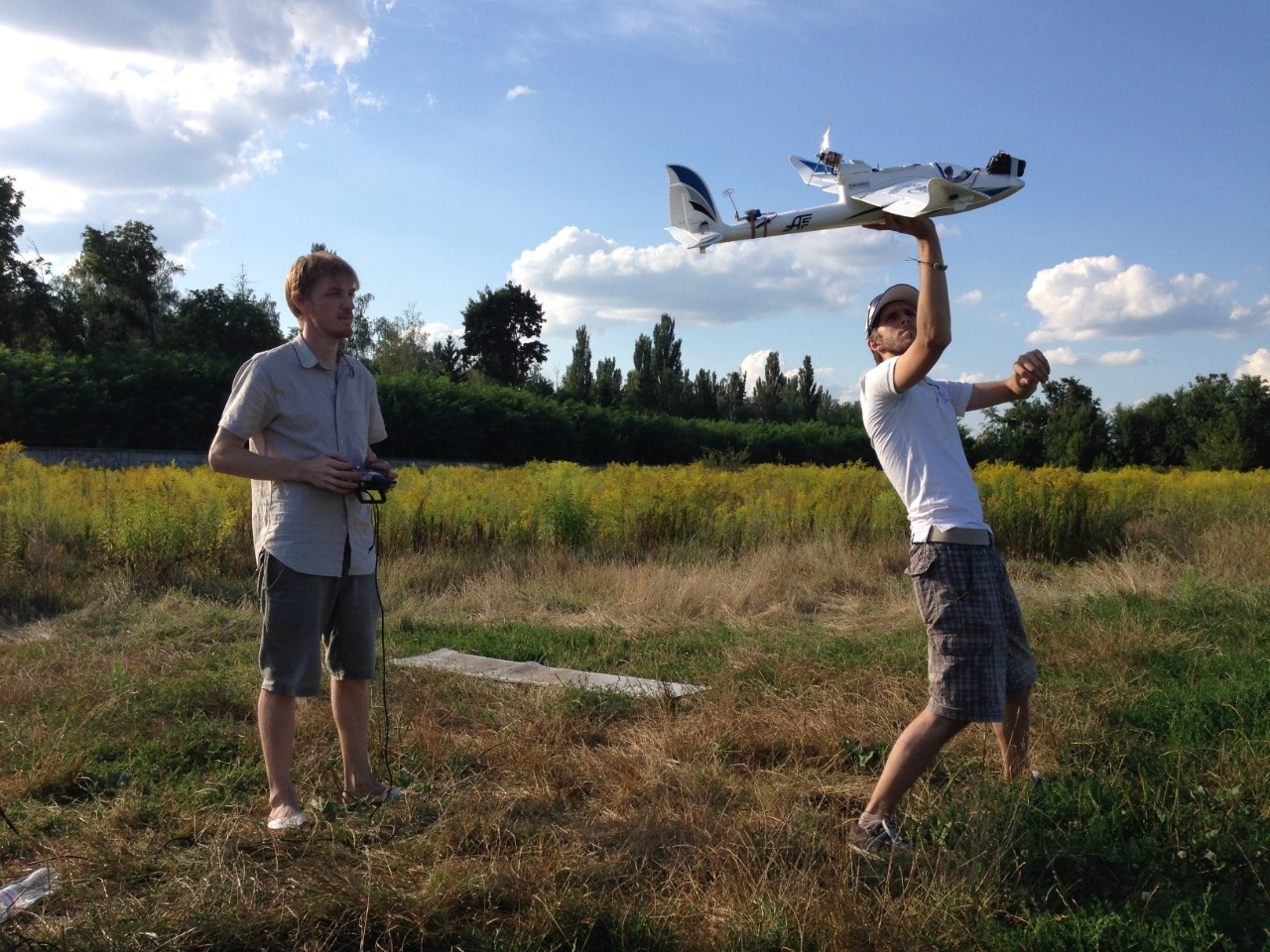
The first testing of UAV by Aerorozvidka, 2014.

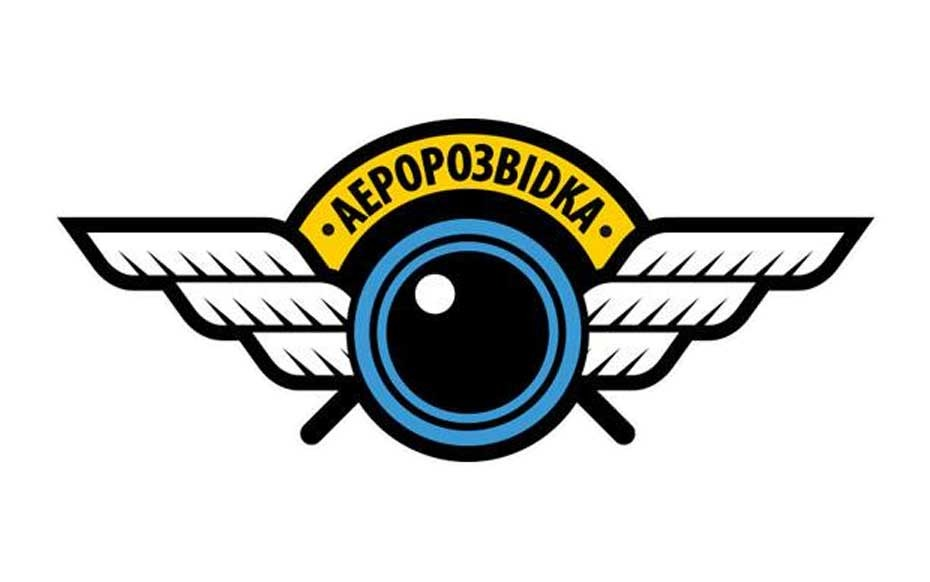
The first logo of Aerorozvidka, 2014.

In order to develop the drone further, Volodymyr Kochetkov-Sukach enlisted the help of the "Aidar" battalion, where it received a positive feedback in testing. Yaroslav Honchar collaborated with the Krok computer academy to further modify the platform for use in combat conditions. Flight range was dramatically increased, going from 300 meters to 3 kilometers (1000 feet to 2 miles). Aircraft modeling clubs, individual amateurs and commercial organizations also contributed to this effort. By 2017, many of these drones had been deployed by the Armed Forces of Ukraine and volunteer battalions.

== Status and Cooperation ==
At the beginning of its activity, the Aerorozvidka volunteer group already had cooperated with the Armed Forces, the Internal Troops and the National Guard of Ukraine as well as with the State Border Guard Service of Ukraine. Later, the Aerorozvidka community members joined intelligence units in groups.

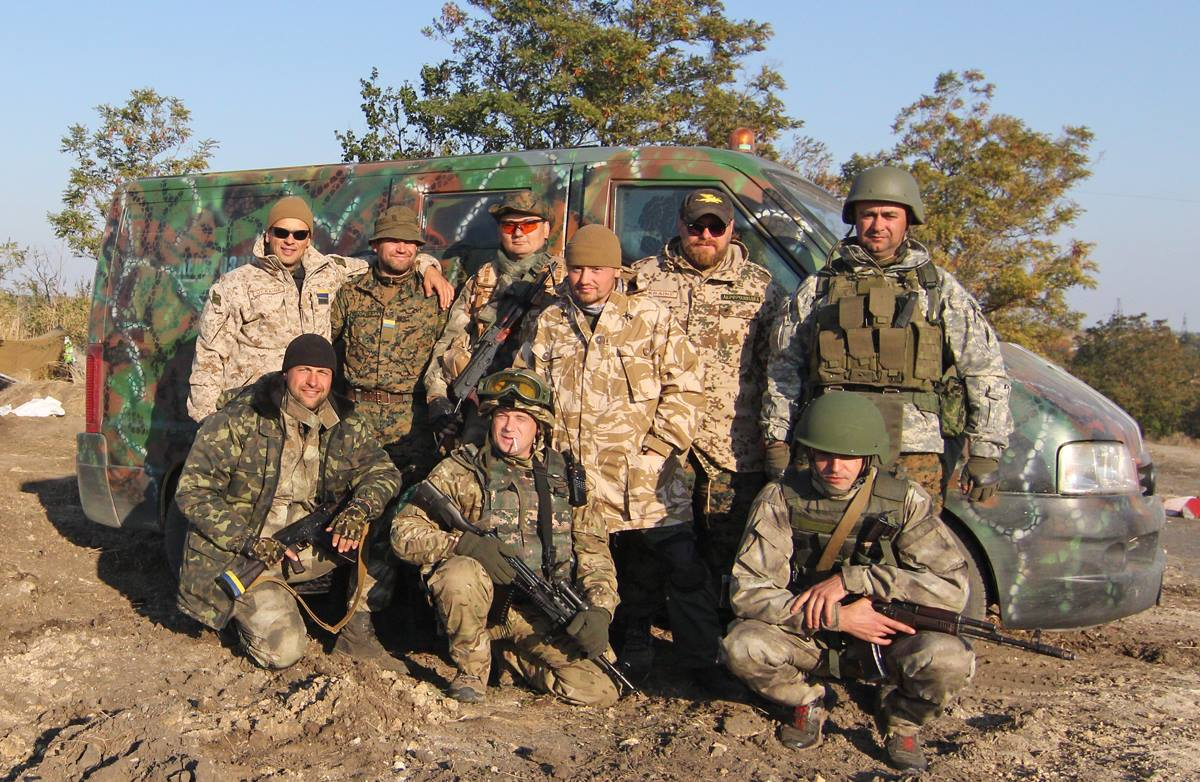
One of the combat units, among which are members and founders of Aerorozvidka, 2015.

In December 2015, members of Aerorozvidka joined the Armed Forces of Ukraine in the form of military unit A2724 called the Center for the Implementation and Support of Automated Operational (Combat) Control Systems. The unit was formed from the Aerorozvidka group volunteers, which worked at that time in separate intelligence units 74 and 131. The new unit joined the Communications and Cyber Security Forces of the Armed Forces of Ukraine. However, in 2020, on the initiative of the General Staff of the Ukrainian Armed Forces, the Ministry of Defense of Ukraine liquidated this military unit. In the NATO system, the unit is classified as C4ISR (command, control, communications, IT (computers), intelligence, surveillance, instrumental intelligence).

In July 2020, the volunteer group members registered the NGO "Aerorozvidka" in Ukraine.

A reorganization took place in March 2021 which saw the A2724 military unit restored within the structure of the Ministry of Defense. One group within the unit, working on video surveillance, was moved under the Joint Forces Command of the Armed Forces of Ukraine. By the end of 2021, the Center for Innovations and Defense Technologies was also spun off; from 2022 onward, it appears in official sources under the name "Center for Innovations and Development of Defense Technologies". The remainder of unit A2724 then became the scientific staff of the Military Institute of Telecommunications and Information Technologies.

== Current activities ==
As of 2022, the activities of Aerorozvidka included:

- Development, testing and implementation of automated control tools, primarily the Delta situational awareness system
- Development, testing, implementation and application of sensors for situational awareness systems, particularly video surveillance
- Design and operation of multirotor unmanned aerial vehicles
- Promotion of reforms within the Armed Forces of Ukraine, primarily regarding the implementation of the C4ISR system
- Cooperation with state authorities on the development of capabilities for the security and defense forces of Ukraine and for the reintegration of Aerorozvidka veterans into civilian life
- Application of military technologies, projects, and experiences to civilian spheres (notably those dealing with the Chernobyl Exclusion Zone)
- Participation in international events, including CWIX, Sea Breeze, and Rapid Trident

=== Drones ===
In August 2014, Volodymyr Kochetkov-Sukach reported that Aerorozvidka already produces alternative unmanned aerial vehicles for the needs of Ukrainian military in ATO zone, taking standard copters available in stores as a basis, modernizing them. After that, drones are suitable for tactical reconnaissance. The devices worked on the front lines in five detachments and showed good results: they transmitted data, photos with geotags at a distance of up to 2 km. This is enough for the commander to make a decision to send the detachment.

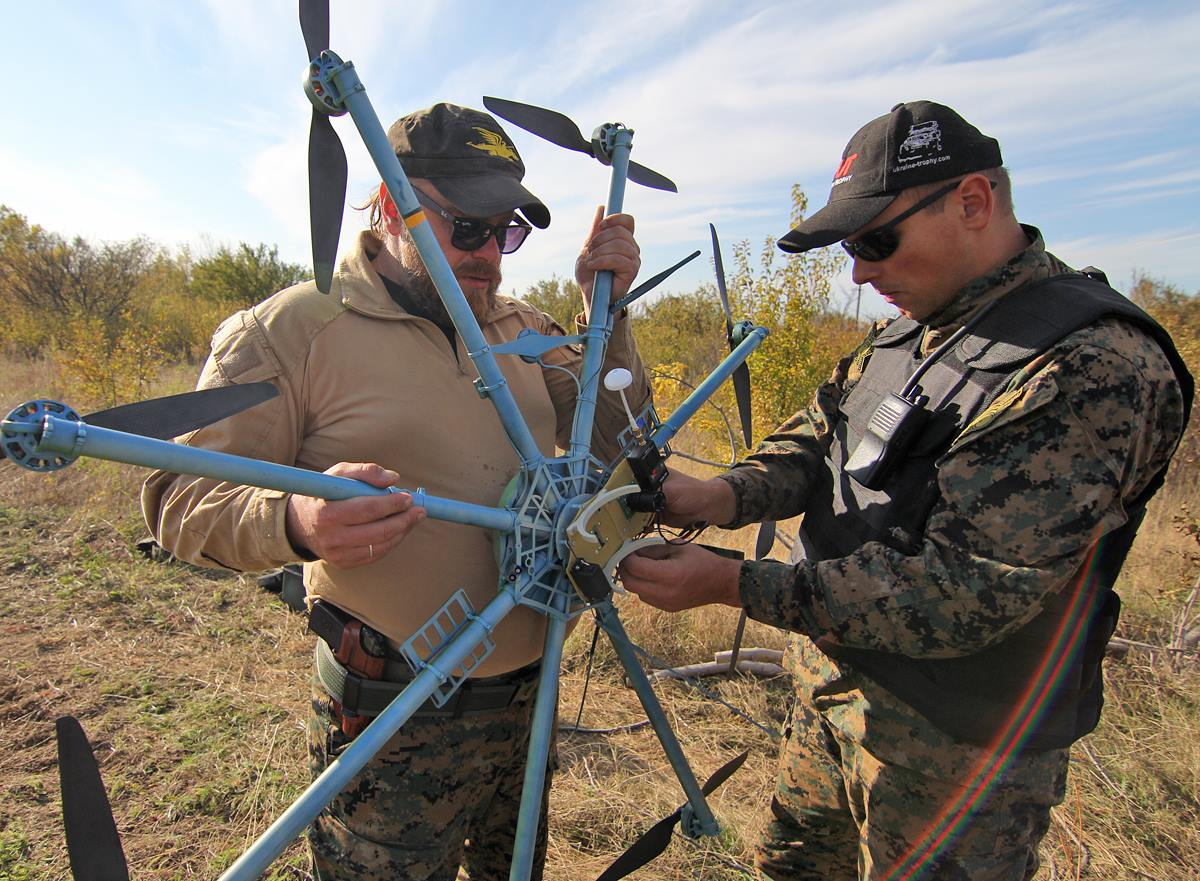
Prototype of R18 octocopter developed by Aerorozvidka, 2015.

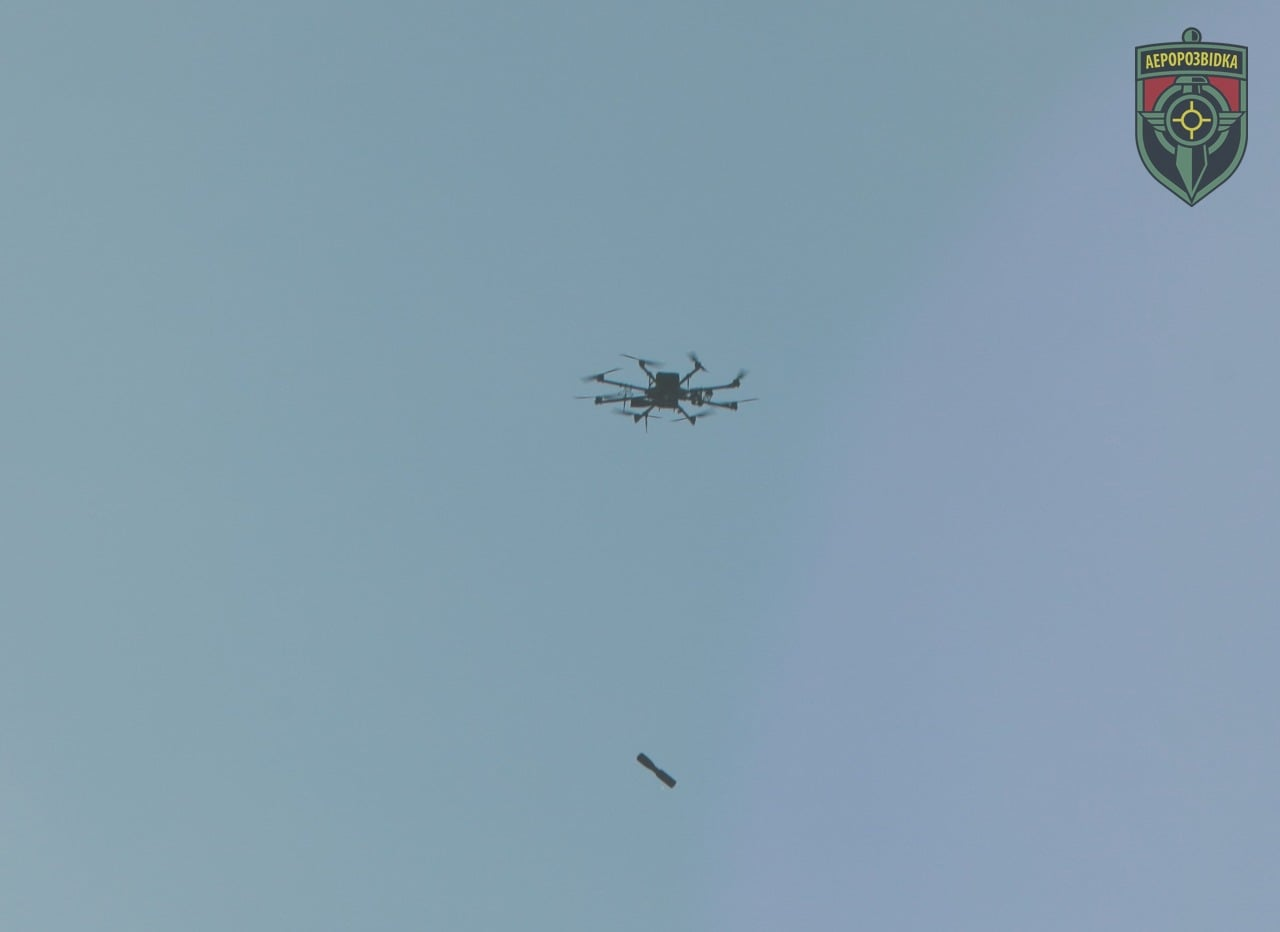
R18 drone test bombing via RKG-1600 in the Shyrokyi Lan training area}e, 2020.

In 2016, Aerorozvidka launched a program to develop the first prototypes of unmanned aerial vehicles. In 2019 the model was fully tested in combat on the east of Ukraine. By 24 February 2022, 50 sets of R18 octocopters, which have eight motors for greater reliability, have been manufactured. Copters are capable of vertical take-off and landing, have range of 5 km (3 miles), can stay in the air for about 40 minutes and carry 5 kg (11 lbs) of payload. Ukrainian and imported components are used for construction. Drones were originally developed to deliver medicine and food, however the Russian invasion on 24 February 2022 changed the way they are used. Those drones are now often used as bombers, with Soviet cumulative anti-tank grenades RKG-3 or RKG-1600 are used as projectiles. The R18 drone can carry three of such grenades.

Apart from that, Aerorozvidka accumulates third-party drones, which combat units use for reconnaissance and adjusting artillery fire. These include, in particular, commercial DJI and Autel drones, which usually come as volunteer aid. PD-1, Leleka-100 and other drones are also purchased for use in the warfare.

Aerorozvidka stated that by mid-2022, the use of drones in warfare had become commonplace, comparing them to other military consumables like rifle cartridges; they also noted the high loss rate for drones during combat operations. Because of this, Aerorozvidka prioritized scalability and low cost in their drone designs, which were notably cheaper to procure compared to others available at the time. By increasing production, they hoped to outmatch opposing drone forces and to save the lives of Ukrainian civilians and military personnel.

Even though most drones have a very short lifespan on the front lines, Aerorozvidka notes that they nonetheless provide a critical tactical advantage. Even those on the consumer market, often purchasable for around $1000, can be suitable for a range of tasks including reconnaissance, artillery spotting, and ordinance delivery. Many former hobbyist drone pilots have contributed to Ukraine's war effort by rebuilding damaged drones, applying modifications, performing maintenance, and training soldiers. Many other groups have followed in Aerorozvidka's footsteps in applying their civilian skills and expertise to help overcome the challenges faced by Ukraine's armed forces.

== 2022 Russian invasion of Ukraine ==
During the 2022 Russian invasion of Ukraine, squads of drone operators have often targeted Russian forces at night while immobile. On February 24, 2022, a large column of Russian military equipment moved toward Kyiv from Belarus along the right bank of the Dnieper river; later that day, the Ukrainian military units met the enemy near the town of Hostomel. In order to prevent the encirclement of the Ukrainian capital Kyiv, Ukrainian military units, supported by Aerorozvidka drones, attacked Russian troops from the direction of Malyn. After the first few hits, Russian troops dispersed their large columns into groups of five to ten vehicles, reducing their effectiveness. Under unit commander Lt Col Yaroslav Honchar, these units were able to destroy Russian forward military depots and disrupt the flow of supplies. Honchar, an IT marketing consultant who had previously served in the armed forces, had returned to active duty following the first Russian invasion of Ukraine in 2014.

Aerorozvidka reported that high-speed Starlink terminals were a critical force multiplier in defeating the Russian attack on Kyiv. The high level of coordination between combat brigades and drone units enabled the Ukrainian military to react quickly to evolving threats, which activists say would have been impossible without Starlink. The introduction of R18 octocopters, additional Starlink terminals, and eventually the Delta battlefield management system to the Ukrainian military would continue to improve these capabilities.

== Interesting facts ==
- The term "aerial reconnaissance" in Ukrainian (Ukrainian: аеророзвідка) given name for Aerorozvidka has been introduced by the founders of the organization Yaroslav Honchar, Volodymyr Kochetkov-Sukach, and Natan Khazin. Prior to that Ukraine used the term "aerial photography".
- On February 9, 2015, a powerful explosion happened in Donetsk. Representatives of Aerorozvidka claimed they had adjusted that strike.
