= Baba Yaga (aircraft) =

Ukrainian bomber drone

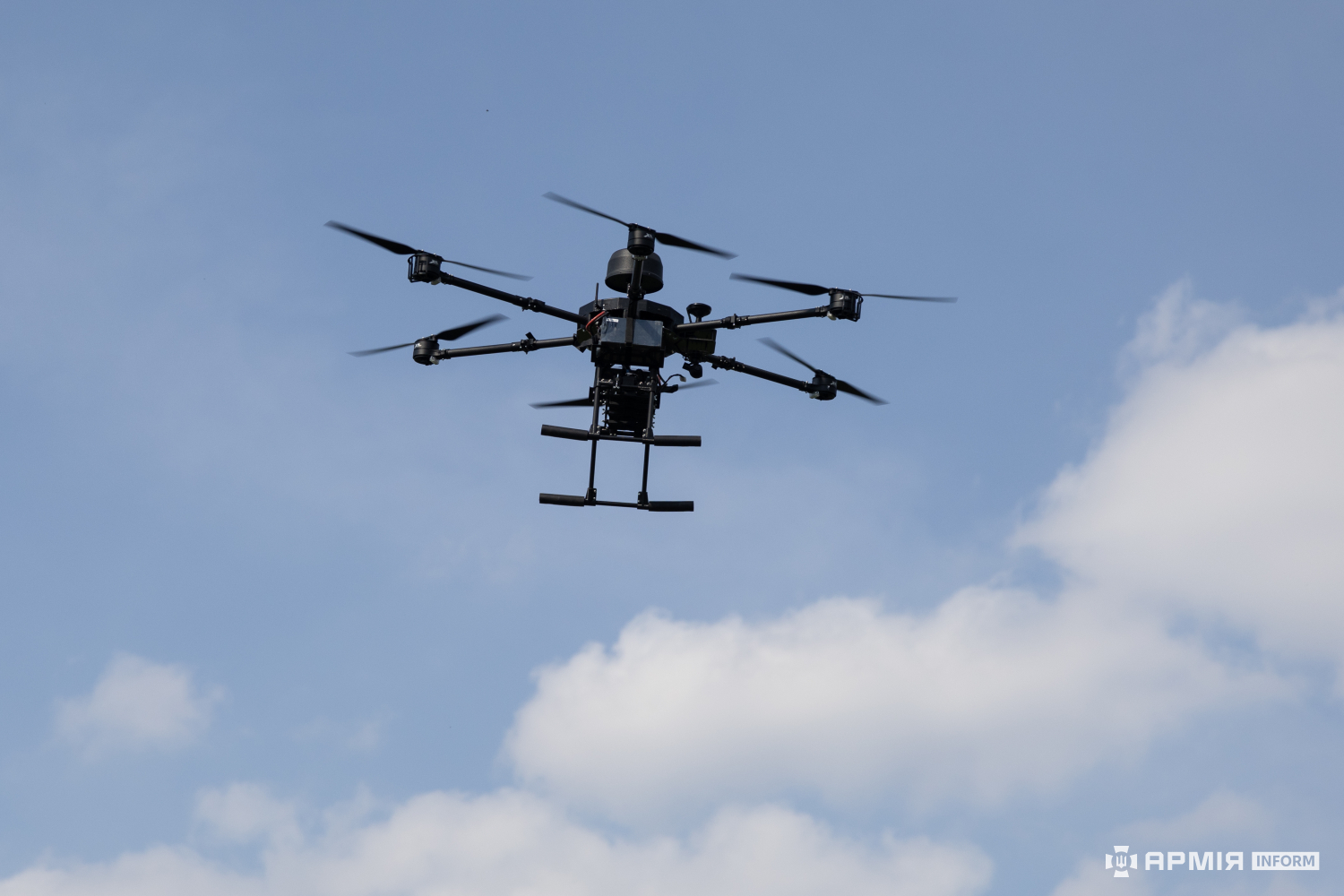
- Type: UAV; Bomber drone
- Place of origin: Ukraine

Service history
- In service: 2022–present
- Used by: Ukrainian Armed Forces; Russian Armed Forces (captured)
- Wars: Russian invasion of Ukraine

Baba Yaga (Russian: Баба-яга; Ukrainian: Дрон-бомбардувальник) is the Russian nickname for a number of Ukrainian heavy bomber drones used in the conflict following the 2022 Russian invasion of Ukraine. Several models are referred as Baba Yaga, including Aerorozvidka R18, Kazhan, Nemesis and Vampire.

== Nickname ==
"Baba Yaga" is a reference to the Slavic mythological creature Baba Yaga, a supernatural witch who flies around in a cauldron or mortar.

== Gallery ==
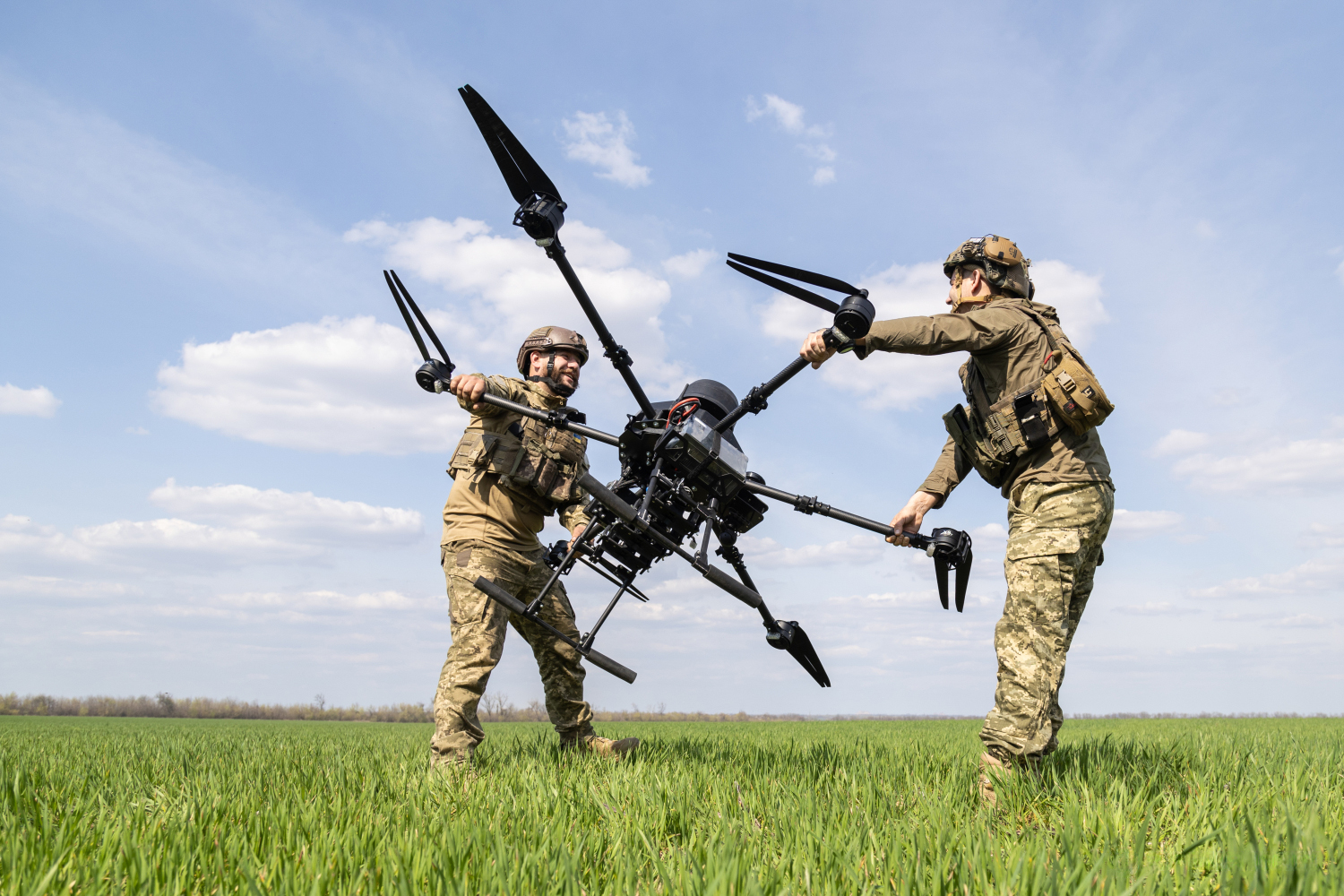
Drone calibration

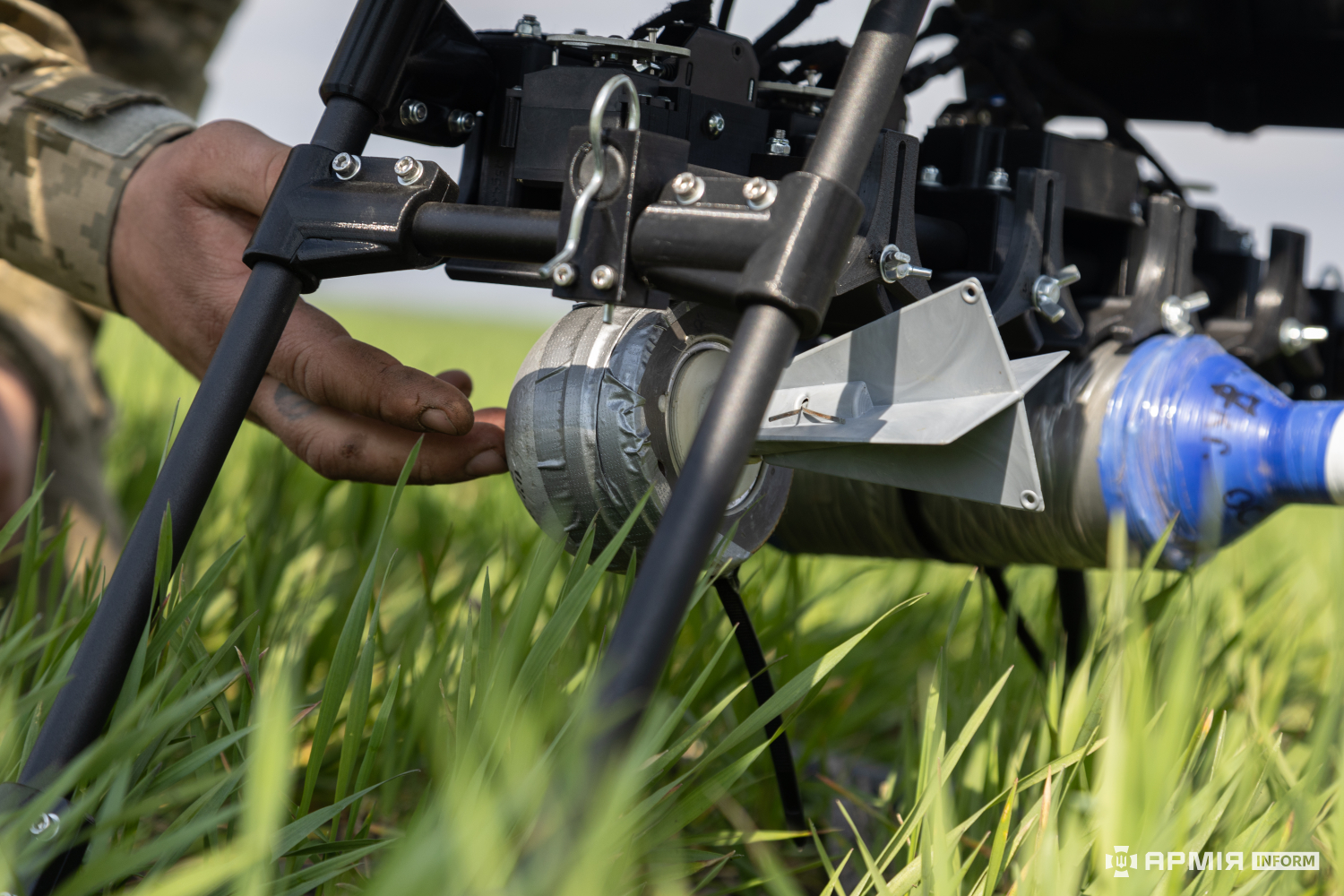
Suspended bombs

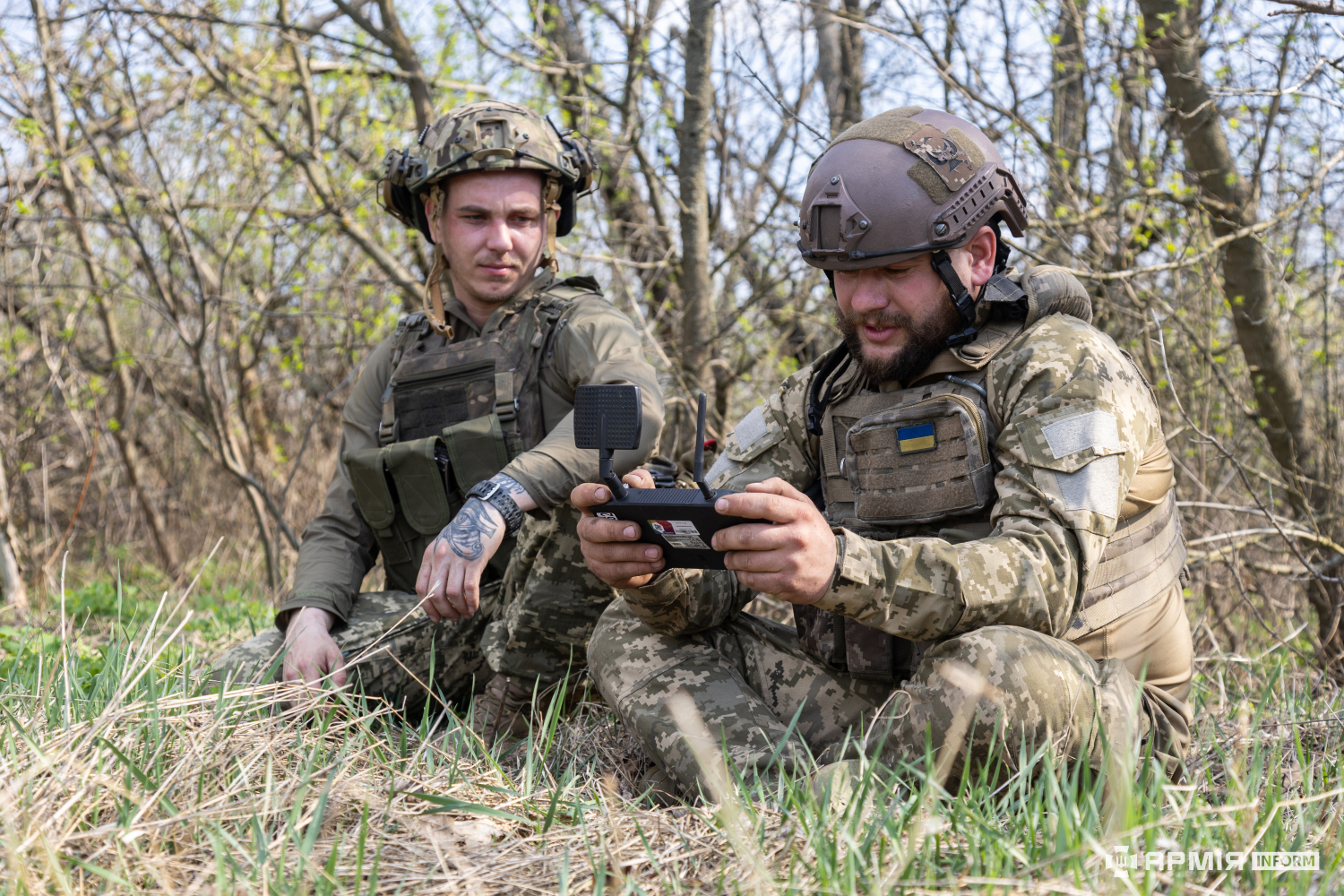
Operators

Video of destruction by Russian FPV quadcopter

== Construction ==
Baba Yaga are large multirotor drones, with four, six or eight rotors. They are equipped with an infrared (thermal imaging) camera and able to carry up to a 15-kilogram (33 lb) rocket warhead.

Baba Yaga originated from an agricultural octocopter. Russian state media reported use of the drones in the eastern Donbas was based on heavy agricultural drones, and were nicknamed Baba Yaga after "a ferocious old woman".

== Use ==
Baba Yaga was used both as a bomber deploying "mortar-sized munitions" and also as a "mothership" drone equipped with a signal repeater, anti-jamming equipment, batteries, and directional antennas. Its ability to function as a signal repeater extended the battery life and range of secondary drones. The drones have been used primarily at night during the Russian invasion of Ukraine.
