= KZ900 =

The KZ900 reconnaissance pod is an airborne signals intelligence (SIGINT) pod, used by the Chinese military, that was first revealed to the public at the China International Aviation & Aerospace Exhibition in Zhuhai, in 1998. It was designed by Southwestern Institute of Electrical and Electronics (SIWEE) in Chengdu.

KZ900 SIGINT pod is designed to collect radar signals over a wide band of frequency ranges, though the exact frequency band width remains classified, despite that the pod has been shown in nearly every airshow and defense exhibition in China. Like the BM/KG300G ECM pod, the KZ900 SIGINT pod is also highly digitized, and can be installed on a variety of platforms from helicopters to heavy bombers. The system adopts modular design and with open architecture software programming, and it is fully automatic, though human intervention is also optional. The pod is designed to provide real time information on enemy electronic order of battle and can be integrated with other COMINT to form a comprehensive ELINT system, or integrated as part of ECM system. KZ900 is trainable and compatible with MIL-STD-1553B standard. Built-In Test Equipment (BITE) function is also incorporated. The next generation KZ900 SIGINT pod is already in development, and is designed to MIL-STD-1773 standards.
