= Qinetiq Mercator =

British/Belgian remote sensing system

Qinetiq Mercator 1 is a joint British/Belgian remote sensing system utilising a modified version of the Qinetiq Zephyr High Altitude Long Endurance (HALE) unmanned aerial vehicle (UAV) as a platform.

The reconnaissance pod was designed by the Belgian research institute VITO. It was called Medusa. The airplane is designed to provide remote sensing for flood management, disaster relief, fire spotting and environmental and agricultural monitoring.

Mercator was first tested in 2012.

== Technical aspects ==
- Weight 32 kg
- Wingspan: 18 m
