= Aerorozvidka R18 =

Ukrainian unmanned combat aerial vehicle

R18
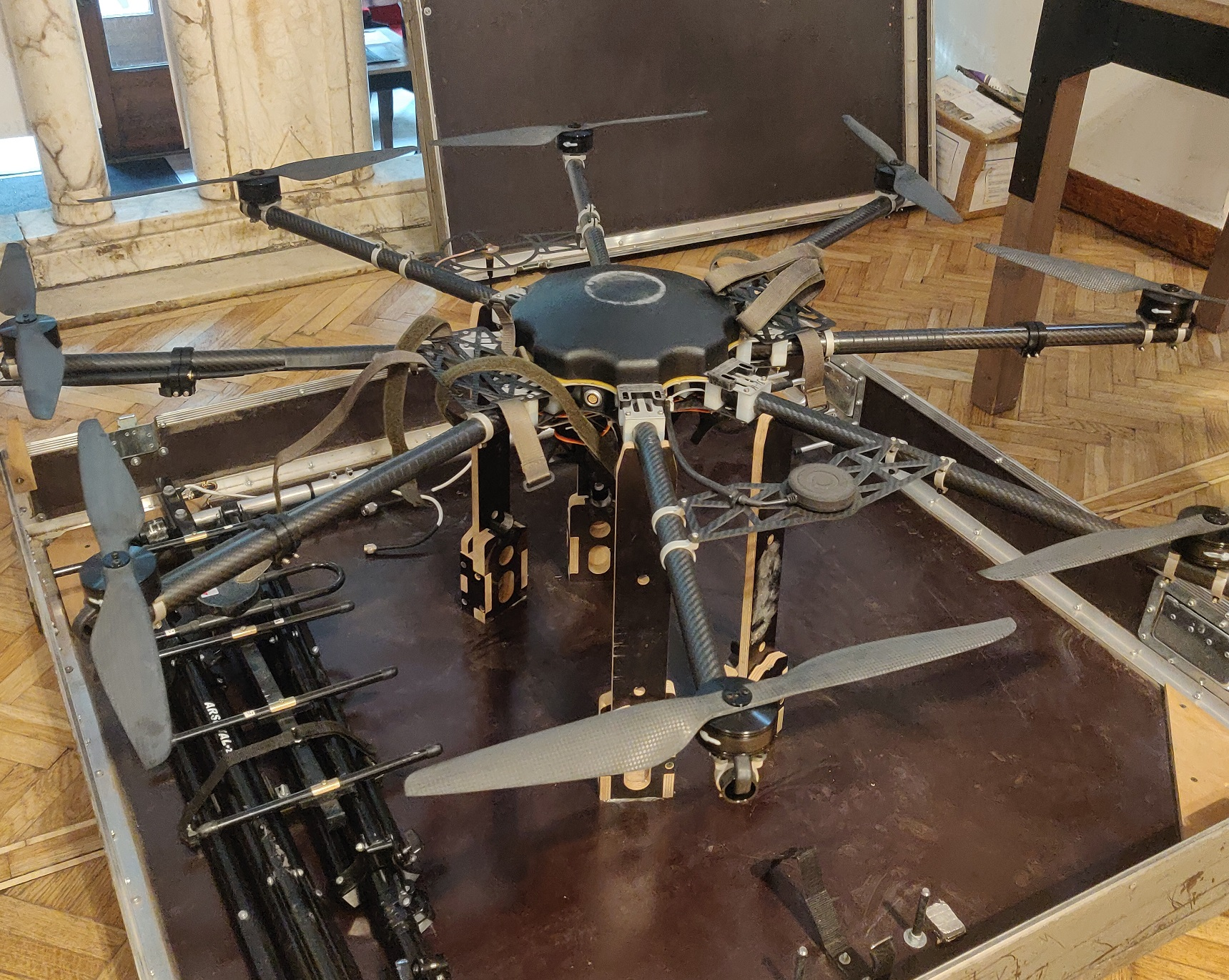
- R18 drone on exhibition, 2022

General information
- Type: Unmanned aerial vehicle
- National origin: Ukraine
- Designer: Aerorozvidka
- Primary user: Security & Defense Forces of Ukraine

History
- First flight: 2017; 9 years ago

The R18 is a Ukrainian unmanned combat aerial vehicle designed to attack enemy targets with ammunition. It was developed by Ukrainian organization Aerorozvidka. The R18 is in service with the Security and Defense Forces of Ukraine in the Russo-Ukrainian War, which has been ongoing since 2014.

== History ==
In 2016, Aerorozvidka started a program to develop the prototypes of its unmanned aerial vehicles. In 2019, the model was tested and saw use during a special operation in the ATO zone.

== Purpose ==
The R18 has both military and civilian applications. The octocopter is used for surveillance and search, delivering cargo, or inflicting damage. As of 2022, the last function in Aerorozvidka is called the most relevant because many other drones with cameras can collect information. The complex is designed to destroy enemy equipment, small fortifications, and warehouses with ammunition.

== Application ==
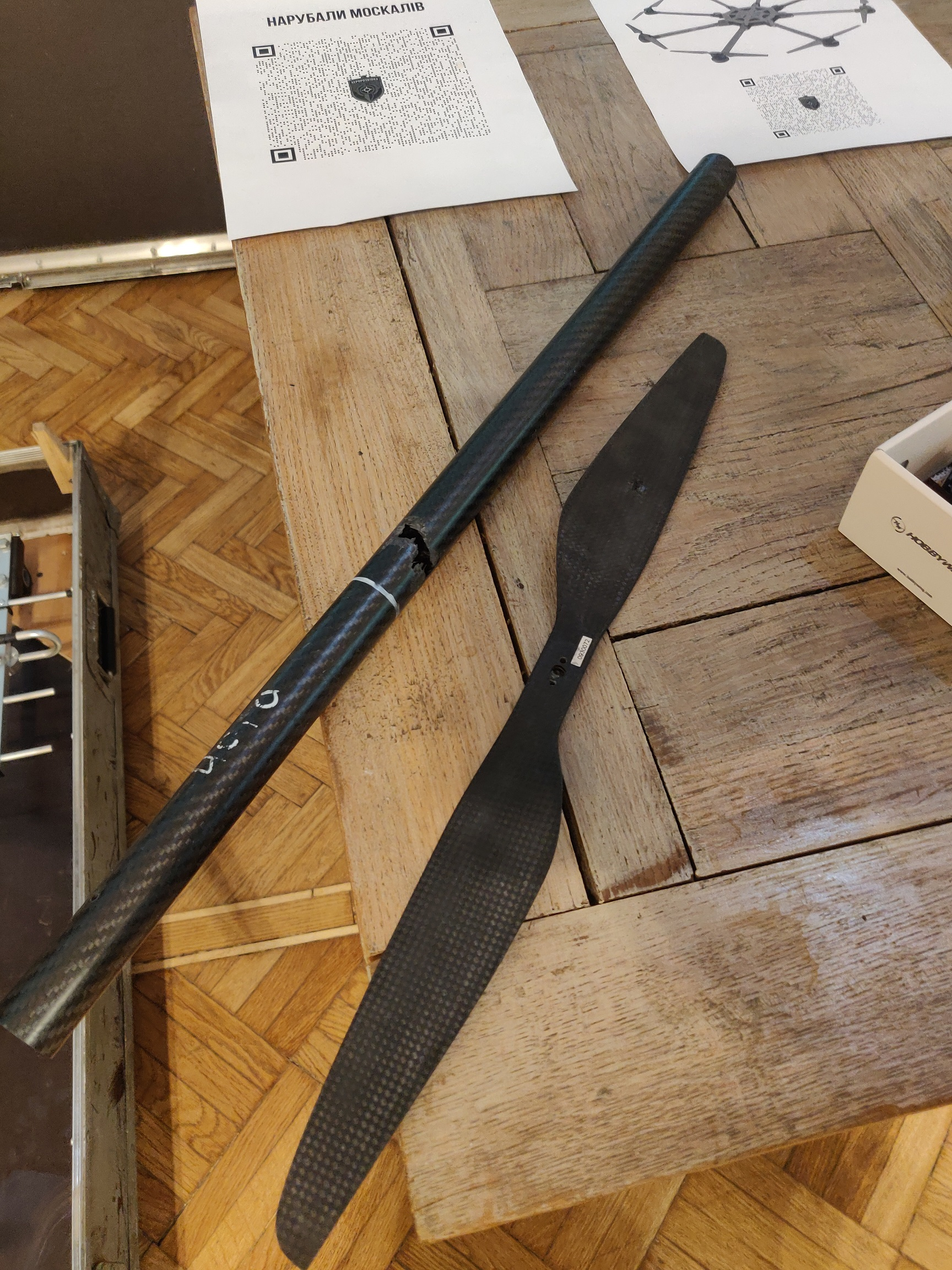
Parts of the R18 drone damaged as a result of shelling in a combat sortie, 2022

Combat use of the R18 started in 2019 during the Russo-Ukrainian War. They work with the octocopter mainly at night, using the tactics of the Special Operations Forces of the Armed Forces of Ukraine. The targets of drone attacks are mostly enemy cannons, tanks, armored vehicles, and trucks.

On the first day of Russia's large-scale invasion of Ukraine, February 24, 2022, one of the combat units prepared equipment and moved to the area of the airfield in Hostomel. Through horizontal communications, representatives of Aerorozvidka began to communicate with those involved in the events. On the first night, an R18 drone was used to inflict damage on paratroopers at the airport.

As of July 2022, 20 crews of R18 drones are working on the front lines of the Russo-Ukrainian War and have neutralized more than 100 units of enemy equipment. In June, Aerorozvidka noted that the R18 is used by the Main Directorate of Intelligence, the Special Operations Forces of the Armed Forces of Ukraine, and other structures of the Ministry of Defense; National Guard; Security Service of Ukraine; other units of the Security and Defense Forces of Ukraine.

== Characteristics ==
The R18 is a multirotor type unmanned aerial vehicle. It is an octocopter, that is, a multicopter with eight propellers. Accordingly, the drone has 8 electromotors. This number of electromotors provides greater reliability. The drone is capable of vertical takeoff and landing. Both Ukrainian and imported components are used in its construction.

=== Armament ===
External videos
- The Night Raids on YouTube // R18 actions during Russo-Ukrainian War
- Cut down the Russian invadors on YouTube // R18 damaging during Russia's large-scale invasion of Ukraine
- Exam on YouTube // Examination of the future R18 crew
- Worked against the enemy on YouTube // R18 landing after fly

To use the R18 drone as a bomber, Soviet RKG-3 HEAT grenades are used or RKG-1600 bombs created on their basis by gunsmiths of the Mayak plant (weight of one is 1.6 kg), both of which are capable of neutralizing lightly armored vehicles with an attack from above. The accuracy of hitting with the RKG-1600 is one square meter from a height of 300 meters. The R18 is capable of carrying three such munitions. It can fly up to 40 sorties without additional maintenance or repair.

=== Other characteristics ===
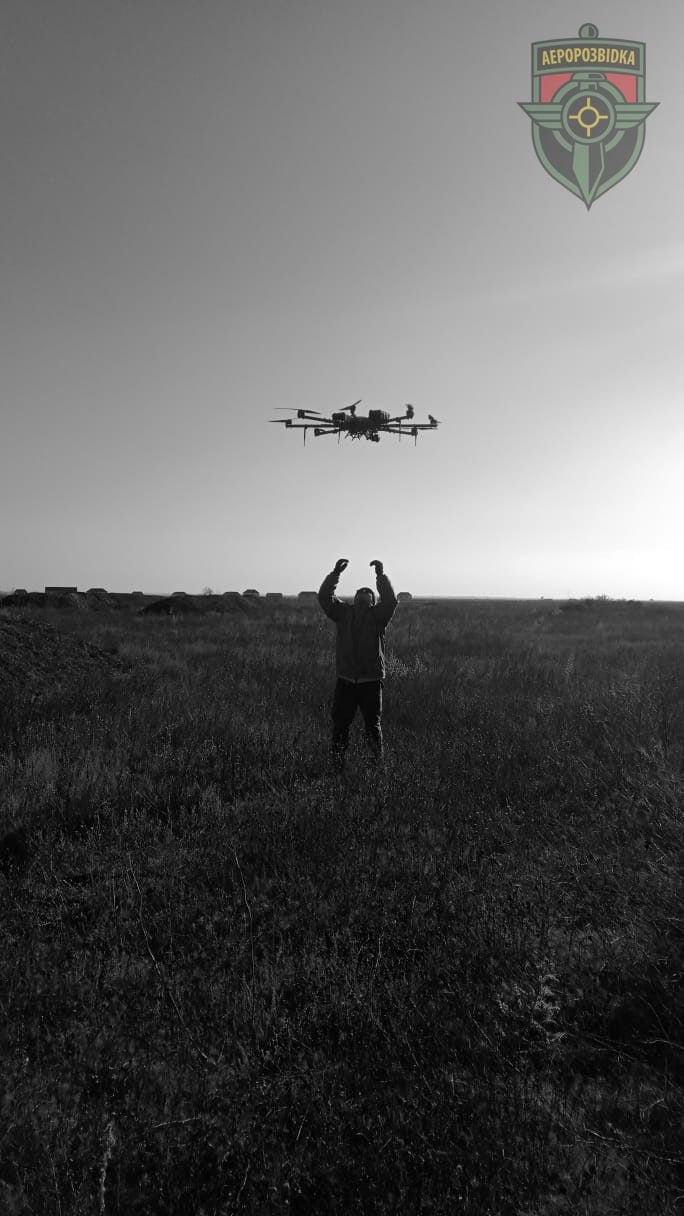
R18 drone landing after a test run, 2020

- complex deployment time — up to 15 minutes;
- equipping with a thermal imager — yes;
- number of mounts for projectiles — 3 pcs.;
- total weight — 17 kg;
  - weight without batteries — 6.45 kg;
  - the weight of the battery pair is 5.55 kg;
  - the weight of the thermal imaging suspension — 490 g;
  - useful load capacity — up to 5 kg;
- ammunition drop height — up to 300 m / from 100 to 300 m
- speed — 12 m/s;
- vertical speed — 2.5 m/s;
- wind resistance — 10 m/s;
- ambient temperature range — from −15 to +35 °C;
- radius of action — 5 km;
- application distance — 20 km;
- flight duration — 45 minutes;
- overall (transport) dimensions — 1200x1200x400 mm;
- battery type — Li-ion 6s 24v 32,5 Ah x 2.

== Training ==
The training of one R18 drone pilot lasts from two weeks to a month.

== Trials ==
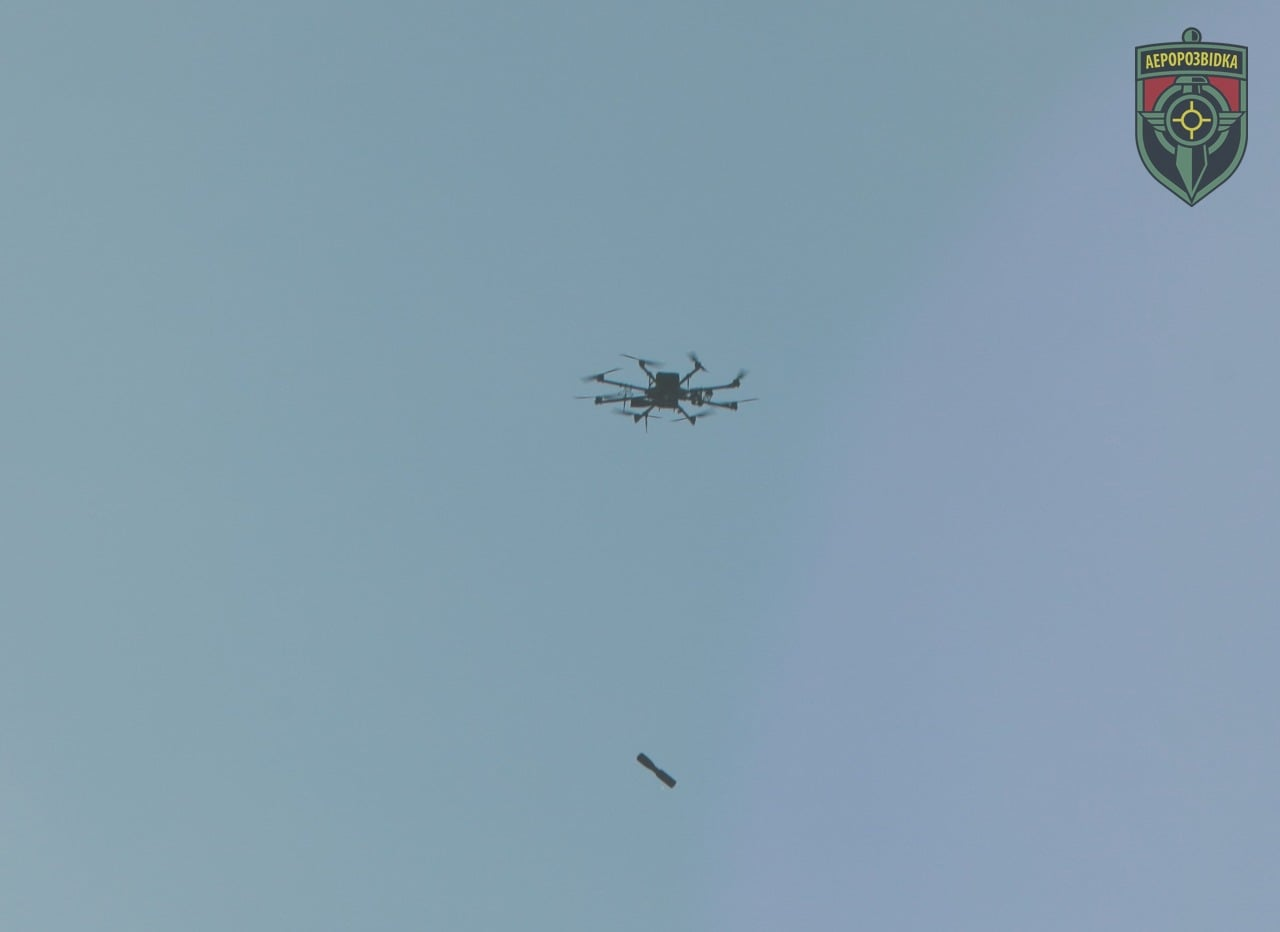
R18 drone launches the RKG-1600 projectile at a proving ground, 2020

In 2020, tests of dropping new RKG-1600 training and simulation ammunition from an R18 octocopter took place during command and staff exercises at the base of the 235th interspecies training center for military units and units ("Shirokiy Lan" training ground). It is noted that this was the first time when an Aerorozvidka attack drone was included in the combined combat training program. During testing, drone operators successfully hit all targets.

== Funding ==
Aerorovizdka independently collects funds from donations for the production of the R18.

== Assessments ==
According to Aerorovizdka, a feature of the use of R18 octocopters at the front in the Russian-Ukrainian war, which has been ongoing since 2014, has been high payback. It is noted that with the help of relatively cheap equipment, it is possible to inflict significant losses on the enemy:

«Ми розраховували, що $1, вкладений у виробництво дрона R18, завдає збитків на $1000 для ворога. Якщо дрон вражає таку техніку як танк, він окупається за один виліт. Адже знищена техніка коштує мільйони, а техніка, з якою ми працюємо, коштує десятки чи сотні тисяч.»

Translation:

“We calculated that $1 invested in the production of an R18 drone causes $1,000 worth of damage to the enemy. If a drone hits a piece of equipment like a tank, it pays for itself in one flight. After all, destroyed equipment costs millions, but the equipment we work with costs tens or hundreds of thousands.”

== Successor ==
In June 2023, Aerorozvidka announced the development of a new drone, the R-34, which is intended to become the successor to the R-18.

According to Vadym Yunyk, a representative of the Aerorozvidka NGO, the new model is technologically similar to the R-18 but larger and more powerful. The R-34 uses the same electronic architecture, allowing operators to control both generations with a single ground station, which simplifies production and operation. The bomb-release system of the R-34 functions in the same way as the R-18, but can carry five munitions instead of two.

== See also ==
- List of unmanned aerial vehicles
