= Maul Camera Rocket =

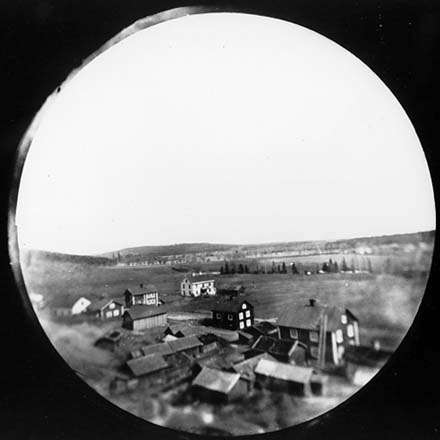
Aerial photograph of Karlskoga taken by Alfred Nobel's rocket in 1896 or 1897

The Maul Camera Rocket was a rocket for aerial photography developed by Alfred Maul's company from 1903 to 1912. The Maul Camera Rocket was demonstrated in 1912 to the Austrian Army and tested as a means for reconnaissance in the Turkish-Bulgarian War in 1912/1913. It was not used afterwards, because aircraft were much more effective.

The Maul Camera Rocket had a maximum flight altitude of 0.8 kilometres (0.49 mi), a launch mass of 42 kg (93 pounds), a diameter of 0.32 metre (12½ inches), a length of 6 metres (19 ft 8 in) and a fin span of 0.35 metres (1 ft 2 in).
