= Prussian semaphore system =

German telegraph system, 1832–1849

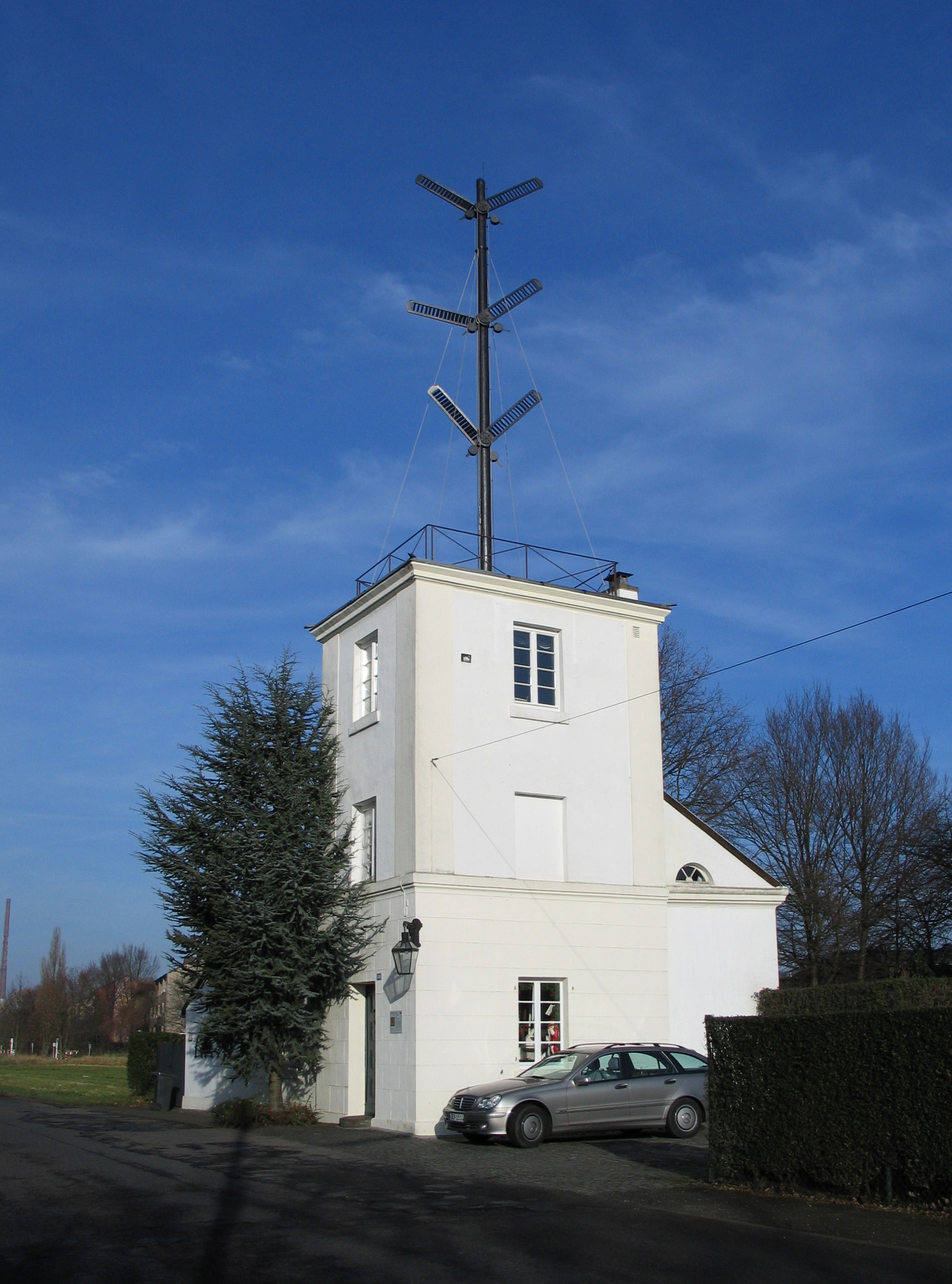
Station 50 in Cologne-Flittard

The Prussian semaphore system was a telegraphic communications system used between Berlin and the Rhine Province from 1832 to 1849. It could transmit administrative and military messages by optical signal over a distance of nearly 550 kilometres (340 mi). The telegraph line comprised 62 stations each furnished with a signal mast with six cable-operated arms. The stations were equipped with telescopes that operators used to copy coded messages and forward them to the next station. Three dispatch departments (telegraphische Expeditionen) located in Berlin, Cologne and Koblenz handled the coding and decoding of official telegrams. Although electric telegraphy made the system obsolete for military use, simplified semaphores were still used for railway signals.

== Historical background ==
At the time of construction of the Prussian semaphore system, the technology had already been known for thirty years. It was based on earlier designs by Claude Chappe and his brother which were in use in France on many telegraph lines from 1794.

Soon Sweden, Denmark, and England also had working optical telegraph systems while couriers remained in use throughout Germany. The states that existed in German-speaking areas at the end of the 18th century were uninterested in a communications system that crossed multiple borders and the political conditions did not exist to put the necessary treaties and agreements in place among these states. Countries such as Sweden, England and France had the necessary centralized control for such a project, and they confronted political, military and economic challenges such as securing long coastlines, and controlling sea routes. They were therefore far more motivated to build an advanced communications network.

Prussia was at that time the second largest German state in terms of area and it saw no structural or political necessity for the introduction of telegraphy after the Congress of Vienna of 1814–1815. Plans for the construction of a first telegraph line were delayed by resistance from the conservative Prussian military, even when the usefulness of mobile telegraphy in war is taken into account. It was exactly this technology that was used with success by Napoleon Bonaparte and this at least awakened the interest of the Prussian military.

However, Prussia was confronted with a fragile domestic political situation in its western provinces at the beginning of the 1830s. Nobles and liberals from the Rhine region were opposed to the administration in Berlin. They were strengthened in their movement for a national constitution by the July Revolution in France and the revolution in Belgium in 1830. In this time of turmoil, urgent official messages traveled slowly by courier on horseback. This was unsatisfactory to the Prussian military, therefore, the proponents of a telegraph network could finally execute a plan for a line from Berlin to Koblenz via Cologne.

The technical idea and the initiative to build the then longest telegraph line in central Europe came from the Geheime Postrat Carl Philipp Heinrich Pistor. Pistor wrote a memorandum to the Prussian General Staff in December 1830 which laid out a draft proposal for a telegraph line within the Royal Prussian States. Pistor’s ideas were inspired by the Englishman Bernard L. Watson whose designs were based on the "Second Polygrammatic Telegraph" of William Pasley. The design went back to 1810 and consisted of a mast with six telegraph arms. Pistor took the six-arm principle and thoroughly reworked the mechanics of the construction. Further, his workshop developed the optical telescopes which were a necessary component of the system. The order for the construction of the system was finally given by an order of the Prussian Cabinet on 21 July 1832.

The Prussian system remained the only state-run optical telegraph system within German territory. There were also a couple of examples of privately run systems. The first existed between 1837 and 1850 and was created by the Altona businessman Johann Ludwig Schmidt who operated it as a signal system for ships between the mouth of the Elbe at Cuxhaven and Port of Hamburg. From 1841, this system was run by Friedrich Clemens Gerke, a pioneer in telegraphy for whom the modern telecommunications tower in Cuxhaven is named. The second, also created by Schmidt was inaugurated in 1847. This system ran between Bremen and Bremerhaven, but this second system was taken out of service by 1852 because a competing electric telegraph line that was placed into service at almost the same time.

== Construction and function ==
As with later telegraph operations, the responsibility for the construction of the entire system fell to the Prussian Military. Major Franz August O'Etzel led the construction. O'Etzel studied in Berlin and Paris and trained as pharmacist. He knew the Rhineland as he had previously done survey work in the region. Along with the construction, O'Etzel also concerned himself with the necessary codes for transmitting messages. He wrote the codebooks for the line. Once construction was complete, he was given the title of "Director of the Royal Prussian Telegraph" and he oversaw the operations of the entire system.

=== Route ===
The line began with Station 1 at the old Berlin Observatory in Dorotheenstrasse. The construction of the first section – with fourteen stations – was completed by November 1832. The route ran via the Telegraphenberg 4 in Potsdam across Brandenburg an der Havel to Magdeburg.

The locations of the stations were chosen by O'Etzel himself. In choosing, he took into consideration of existing structures - for example the village church in Dahlem. He also had his team construct towers on existing tall buildings.

In many places along the route, trees had to be felled or have their tops cut off in order to maintain the sight lines between stations. French telegraph operators had already recognized that signals were hard to recognize if they came from stations placed before certain backgrounds, while signals from stations against an open sky were much easier to recognize. For this reason, the Prussian stations were built on higher ground where necessary. Later, such places were often designated as "Telegrafenberg" as with Glidow (station 5) or station 13 southeast of Biederitz. Because the receipt and distribution of messages was intended only for dispatch stations at the beginning and end of the line, no great value was placed on connecting smaller localities and cities. Frequently, stations were placed away from settled areas. The last station of the first section was constructed on the tower of the Johannis-Kirche in Magdeburg.

To hasten construction of the second and longer section between Magdeburg and Koblenz, the finance minister as well as the interior minister ordered all their subordinates to offer their total cooperation to the construction leadership. This was done to avoid time-consuming territorial conflicts between local authorities. If an agreement over the acquisition of a piece of land for the construction of a new station was not possible, expropriation of private lands could be undertaken in the worst case. The line ran north of Egeln (Schloss Ampfurth), through Halberstadt, Goslar, Höxter to station 31 near Entrup where it turned in a southwesterly direction just before reaching Paderborn after crossing the Weser Uplands. Subsequently, it ran along the southern side of a line connecting Salzkotten, Erwitte, Soest, Werl, Iserlohn, Hagen, Schwelm and Lennep it made its way finally to Cologne via the stations Schlebusch (station 49), and Flittard (50). From there he route ran parallel to the east bank of the Rhine via Spich to Ehrenbreitstein. The final station (60) was built into the Ehrenbreitstein Fortress. After the completion of construction and the start of operations of the whole system in 1833, it quickly became clear that the Rhine ferry crossing to Koblenz presented a major hold up in telegraphic traffic. This could only be solved by expanding the line with an end station in Koblenz. In the same year, station 61 was put into service in the Electoral Palace in Koblenz, which was then used as a barracks. The palace also served as the administrative offices for the western section of the route.

The route traveled over Hanoverian domain at stations 22 and 23 in Schladen and Liebenburg. Likewise, stations 23 to 28 lay in the domain of the Duchy of Brunswick. Negotiations with both governments for the acquisition of land and the construction of stations quickly met with success. Additionally, two stations were economized within the Brunswick domain by increasing the distance between stations 23, 24, and 25. After a year of service, it became clear that the wide interval between these stations led to frequent interruptions in visual contact during drizzly and grey weather. In 1842 this problem was solved with the construction of station 24a near Mechtshausen. The entire route now comprised 62 stations. They were on average 11 kilometres (6.8 mi) apart with the longest distance separating stations at 15 kilometres (9.3 mi) and the shortest at 7.5 kilometres (4.7 mi).

There were only two dispatch stations, one at each end of the line. Koblenz was the seat of the Oberpräsident of the Rhine Province and the western headquarters of the Prussian defense force. Messages could neither be sent nor received from the obviously larger and more important economic and transportation center of Cologne. Messages arriving in Cologne from England or Belgium addressed to Berlin had to first be sent by courier to Koblenz and then from there telegraphed again through Cologne to Berlin. This whole process caused a day’s delay. Hence, in 1836, a third dispatch bureau was opened at the Cologne telegraph station of St. Pantleon.

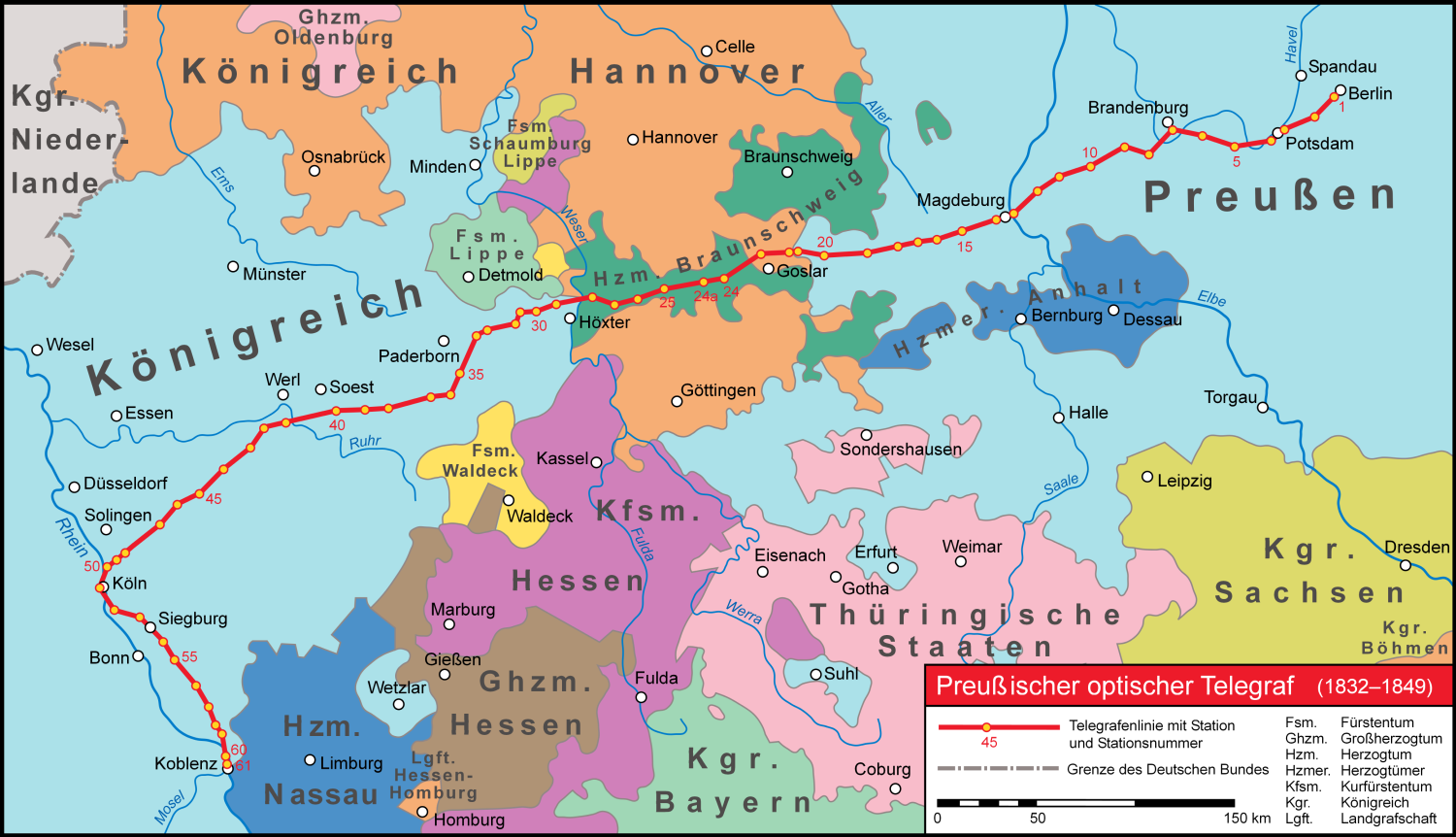
Full route of the telegraph line across Germany

=== Stations ===
The common functional element of all of the telegraph stations was the ca. 6.3 meters (20 ft 8.0 in) high softwood mast. The mast carried the six telegraph arms - also known as indicators - and it also held the control mechanism for the arms. A ring was fastened between the top two sets of signal arms to which was attached four cables that were secured to the four corners of the station roof. This provided additional stability to the mast during storms. The mast and control mechanism ran through the roof of the observation room. The roof was specially sealed against rain. The mast was secured to the floor beams and likewise the roof with cast iron hardware.

=== Indicators and their control ===
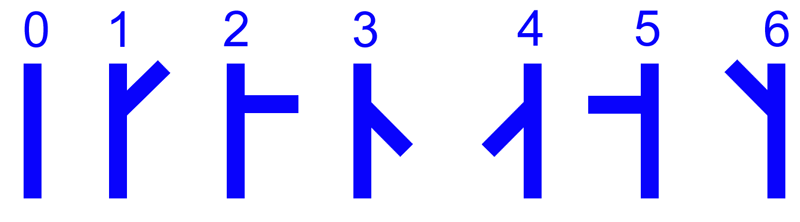
groundposition of arms to display "0–6"

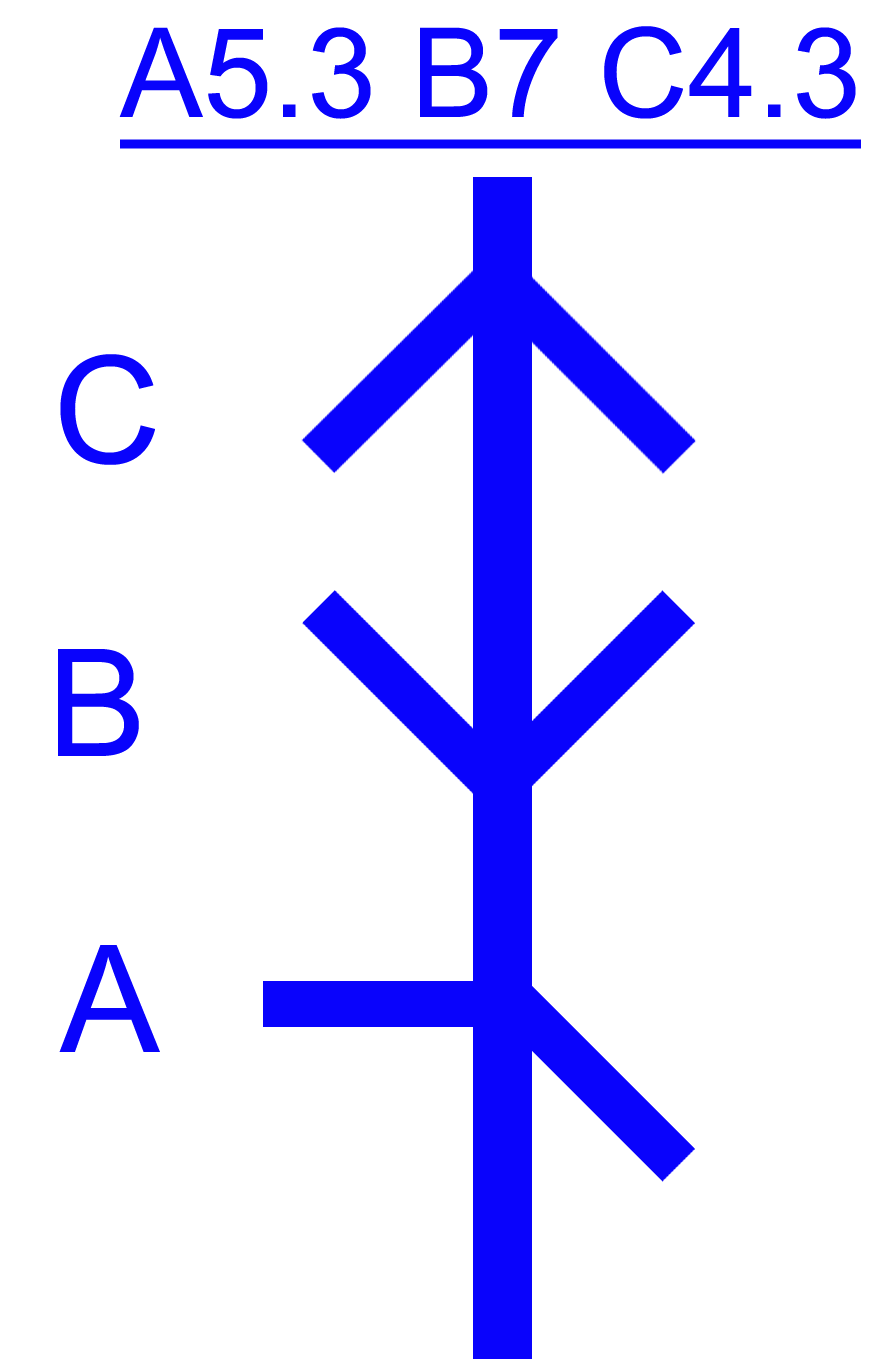
example

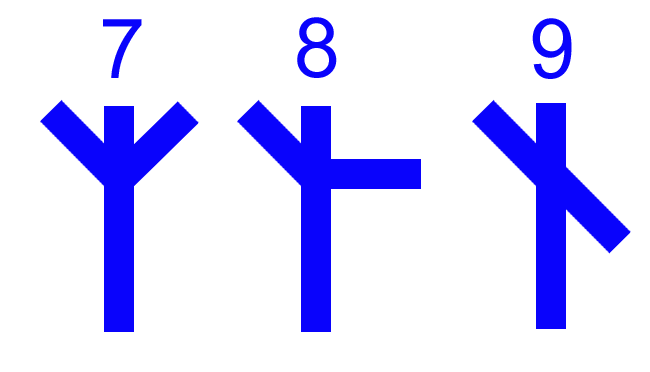
"7–9"

The moving signal arms were suspended with counterweights to enable easy adjustment. The indicators measured 1.74 m × 0.33 m. Only two of the original indicators still exist today; one is on display in the Boerdemuseum in Ummendorf and the other in the Museum for Communication in Berlin. These arms, as well as preserved construction drawings, suggest that the arms consisted of a wooden framework with a wood or sheet metal interior. This provided greater wind resistance.

The operating mechanism of the system was located at the bottom of the mast in the observation room of the station. The indicators were operated with six adjustable levers arranged above each other in pairs. The position of each lever corresponded to the three-level alignment of the signal arms on the mast above. The levers and signal arms were connected by hemp ropes and later by wire cables. The levers each were lockable in four different positions, that exactly corresponded to the position of signal arm: 0° (arm hanging downward parallel to the mast), 45°, 90° (perpendicular to the mast), and 135°. Each position was relative to the mast.

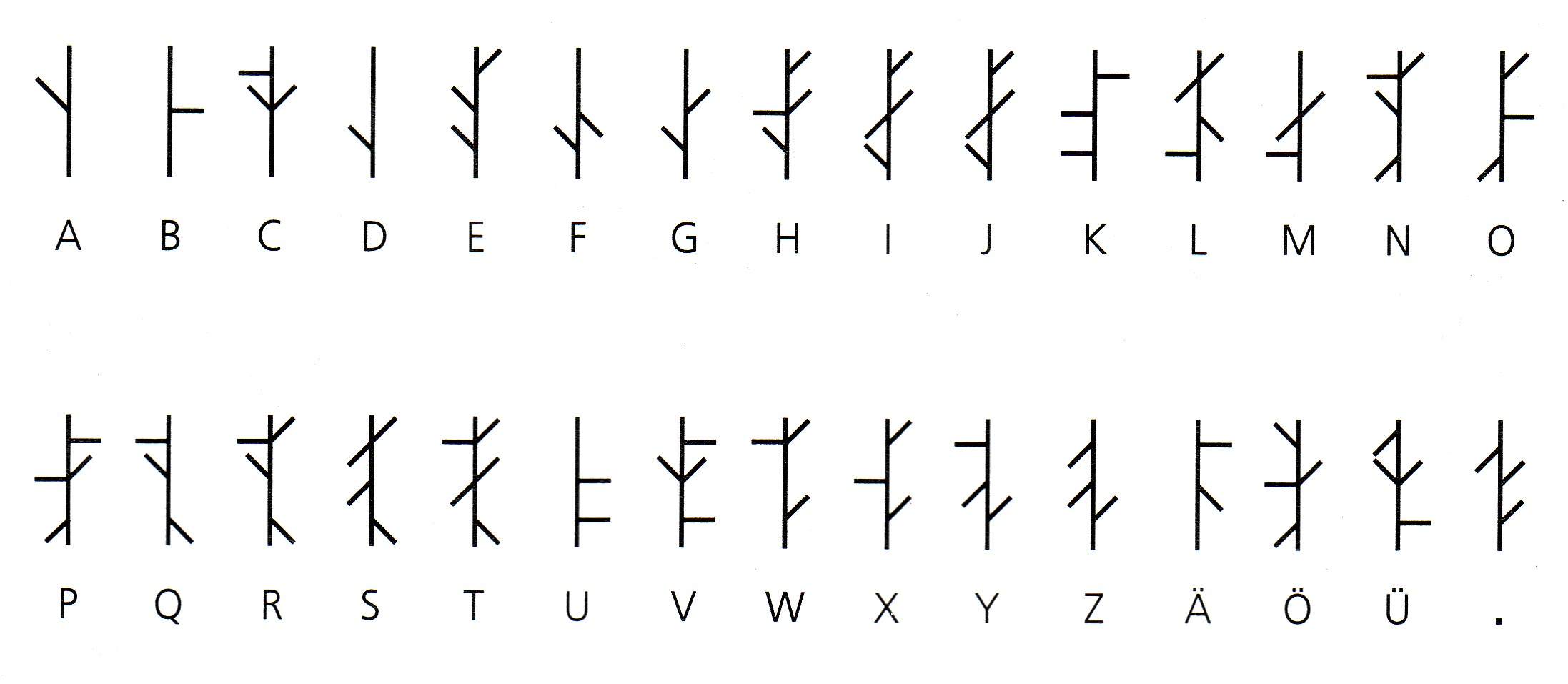
telegraph-alphabet with German "Umlaute"

=== Scopes ===
Each station had two telescopes for observing the neighboring stations. The scopes were either of English construction or they came from Pistor’s workshop. The portion of the route between Cologne and Koblenz was outfitted chiefly with scopes from the Munich lens-maker Georg Merz. The scopes’ magnification is estimated at between 40 and 60x. As with the other technical aspects of the stations, very specific instructions existed at each for the storage, use, and care of the scopes. Twelve paragraphs of instruction were allotted to the scopes alone.

=== Station clocks and time synchronization ===
"Berlin time" was the authoritative time used along the entire telegraph line; with a time-synchronizing message coming from Berlin every three days at the latest. A Schwarzwald clock with a chime hung in each station as the official station clock. The synchronization process would be announced an hour in advance with a signal which prompted the station agents to continuously observe the neighboring station in the direction of Berlin. The signal had to then be sent to the next station without delay. Once the signal reached Koblenz, it was relayed back to Berlin as confirmation. In good weather conditions, the entire process from Berlin to Koblenz and back took less than two minutes. With such a synchronization process, the time difference amounted to less than one minute.

== See also ==
- Semaphore Flag Signaling System
- Flag semaphore
- Heliograph
- Railway signalling
