= SFSS =

SFSS may refer to:

- Simon Fraser Student Society, a student group at Simon Fraser University
- Semaphore Flag Signaling System, a fictional internet standard for transmitting Internet Protocol packets
- Effluent sewer, also called a solids-free sewer system (SFSS), a sewer system that treats waste in septic tanks before pumping the effluent to a central plant
