= Sneakernet =

Informal term for the transfer of electronic information by physically moving media

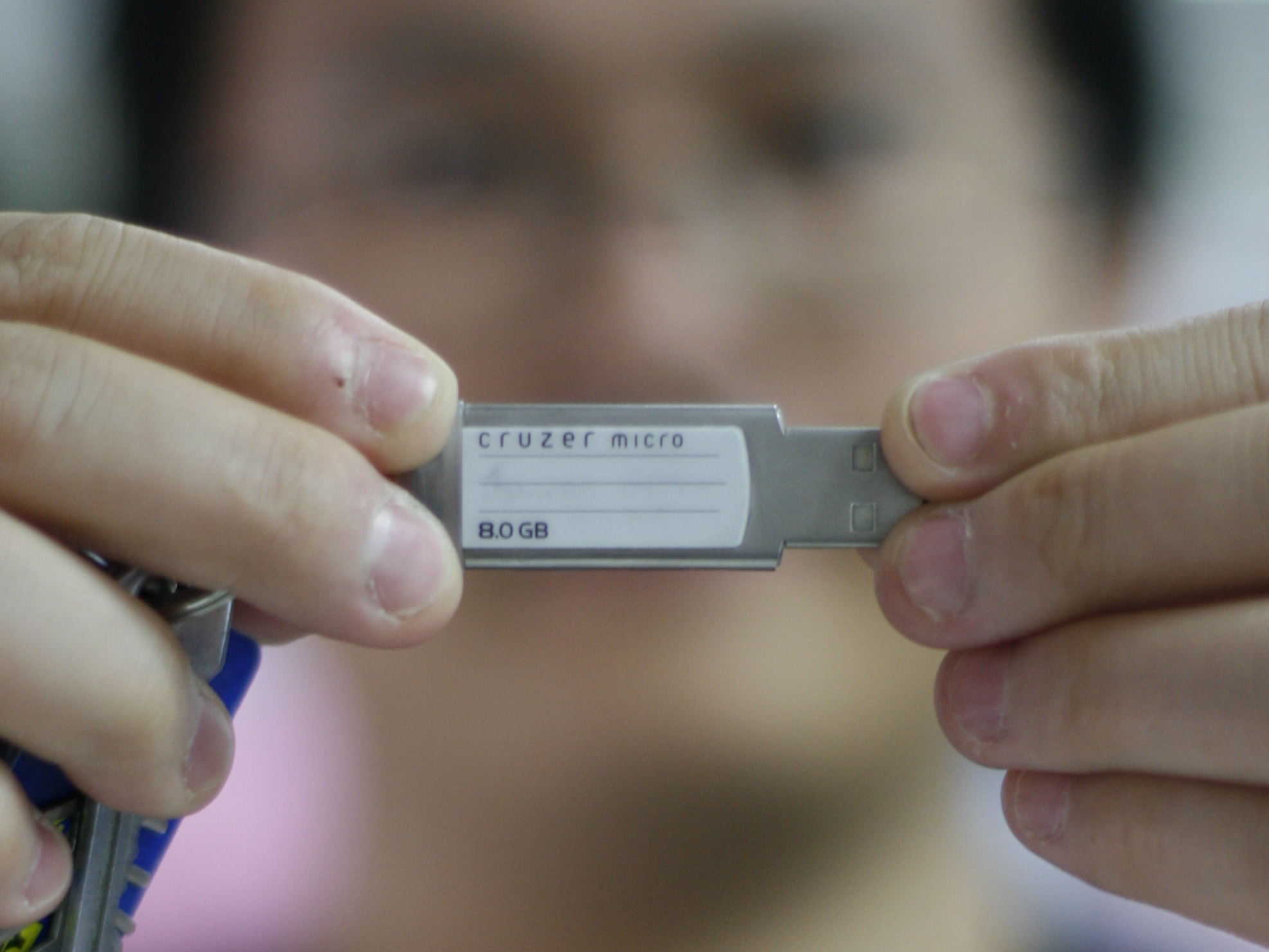
A USB flash drive allows the transfer of data between individuals without use of the Internet.

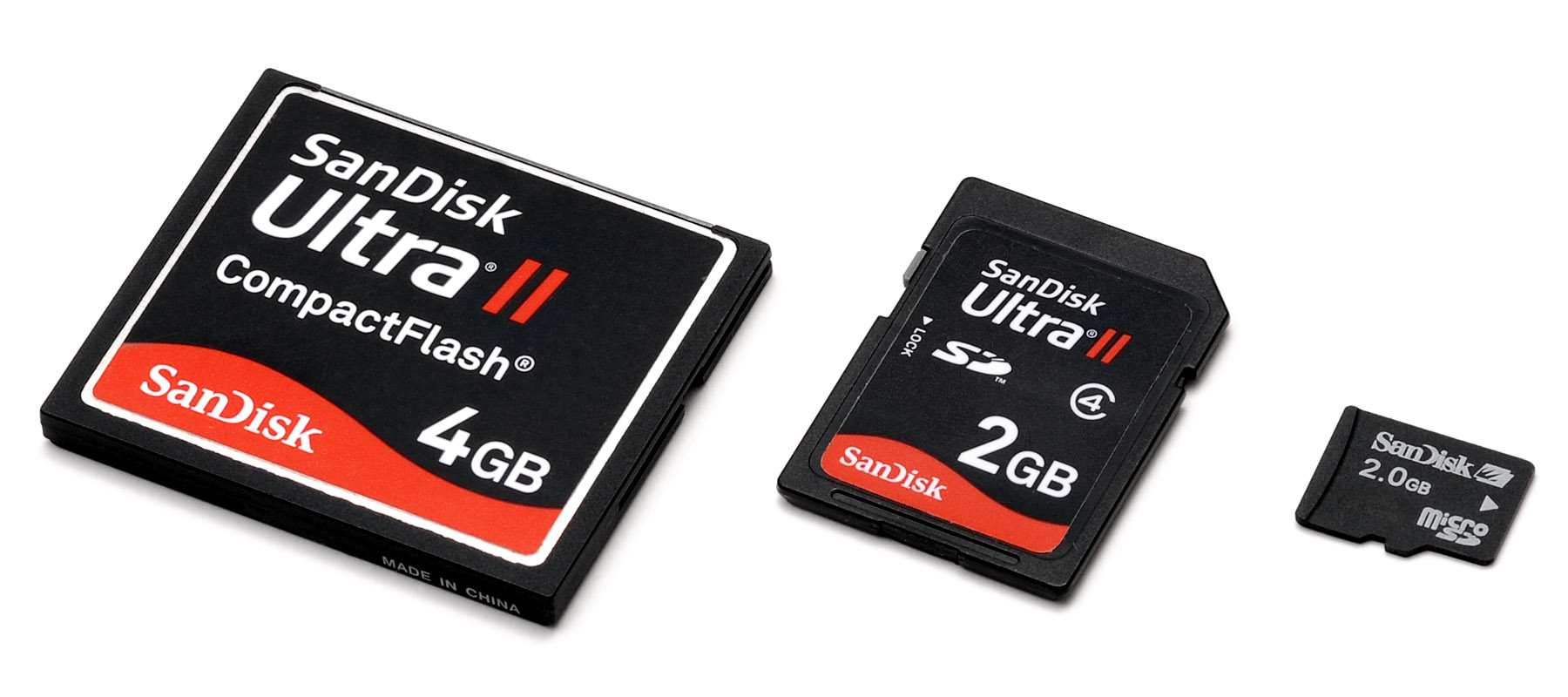
Memory cards are a popular physical medium for transferring files and have become smaller in size as technology has advanced.

Sneakernet, also called sneaker net, is an informal term for the transfer of electronic information by physically moving media such as magnetic tape, floppy disks, optical discs, USB flash drives or external hard drives between computers, rather than transmitting it over a computer network. Sneakernets enable data transfer through physical means and offer a solution in the presence of network connections that lack reliability; however, a consequence of this physical transfer is high latency, due to being literally walked to its destination. The term, a tongue-in-cheek play on net(work) as in Internet or Ethernet, refers to walking in sneakers as the transport mechanism. Alternative terms may be floppy net, train net, or pigeon net.

== Summary and background ==
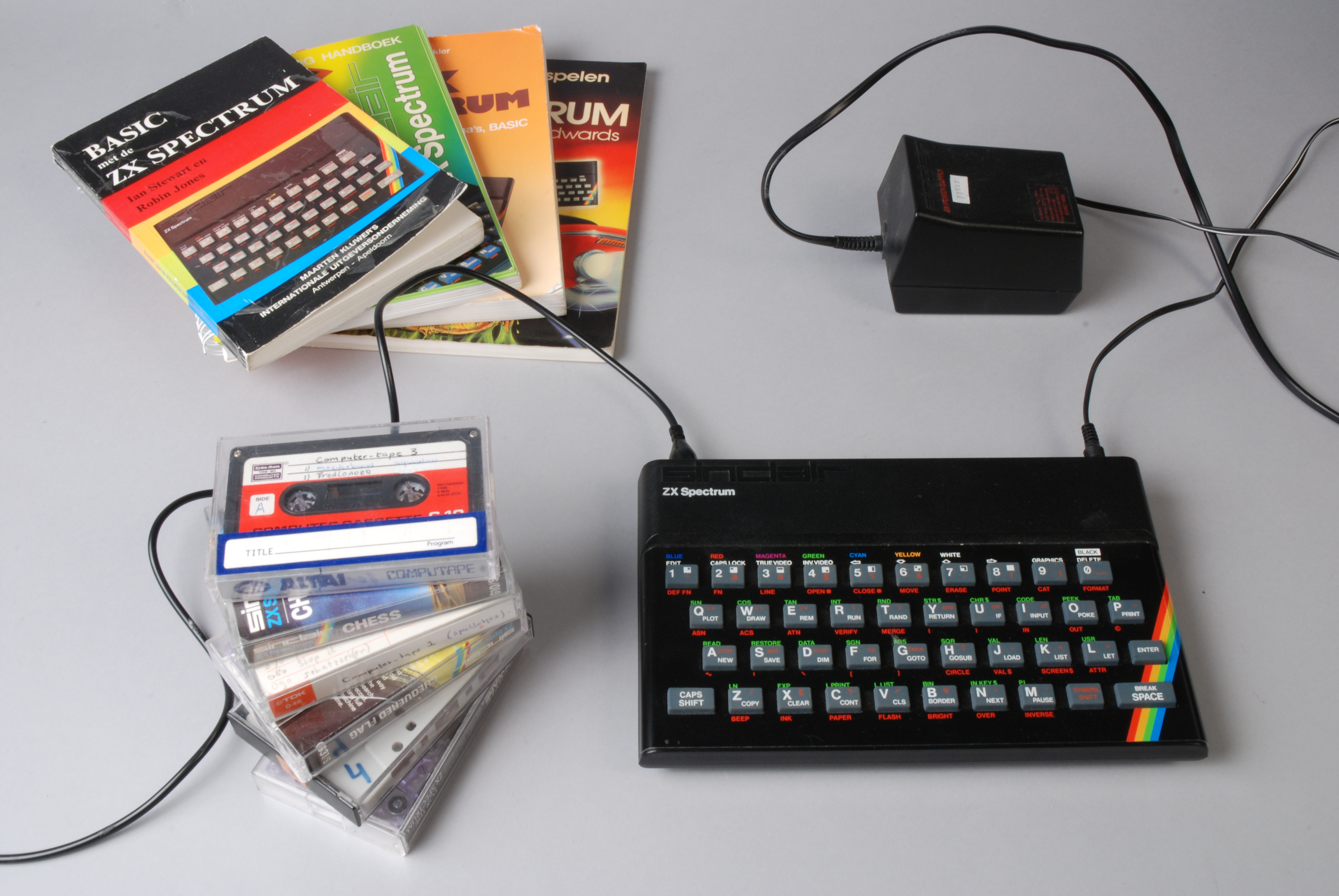
Compact cassettes were a natural way of transferring data between ZX Spectrum systems in the 1980s and 1990s.

Sneakernets are in use throughout the computer universe. A sneakernet may be used when computer networks are prohibitively expensive for the owner to maintain; in high-security environments where manual inspection (for re-classification of information) is necessary; where information needs to be shared between networks with different levels of security clearance; when data transfer is impractical due to bandwidth limitations; when a particular system is simply incompatible with the local network, unable to be connected, or when two systems are not on the same network at the same time. Because sneakernets take advantage of physical media, security measures used for the transfer of sensitive information are respectively physical.

This form of data transfer is also used for peer-to-peer (or friend-to-friend) file sharing and has grown in popularity in metropolitan areas and college communities. The ease of this system has been facilitated by the availability of USB external hard drives, USB flash drives and portable music players.

The United States Postal Service offers a Media Mail service for compact discs, among other items. This provides a viable mode of transport for long distance sneakernet use. In fact, when mailing media with sufficiently high data density such as high capacity hard drives, the throughput (data transferred per unit of time) as well as the cost per unit of data transferred may compete favorably with networked methods of data transfer.

A quantum version of sneakernet was proposed in a paper by Simon Devitt and collaborators in 2016.

== Usage examples ==
=== Afghanistan ===
In 2021 Taliban-governed Afghanistan, "computer kars" distribute Internet-derived content by hand: "Movies, music, mobile applications, iOS updates, and naughty videos. Also creating Apple IDs and social media accounts, and backing up and unlocking phones and recovering data." The kars collectively maintain an archive of hundreds of terabytes of data. Four terabytes of the latest Indian or American movies or Turkish TV dramas, dubbed in the Afghan national languages Dari and Pashto reportedly wholesale for about 800 afghanis, or nine US dollars, while the retail price of five gigabytes of content is 100 afghanis, or one US dollar. Kars report that their earnings have dropped 90% under Taliban rule.

=== Australia ===
When Australia joined Usenet in 1983, it received articles via tapes sent from the United States to the University of Sydney, which disseminated data to dozens of other computers on the country's Unix network.

=== Bhutan ===
The Rigsum Sherig Collection project uses a sneakernet to distribute offline educational resources, including Kiwix and Khan Academy on a Stick, to hundreds of schools and other educational institutions in the Kingdom of Bhutan. Many of the schools in Bhutan have computers or IT labs, but no Internet connection (or a very slow one). The sneakernet, facilitated by teachers, distributes about 25 GB of free, open-source educational software to the schools, often using external hard disks.

=== Cuba ===
El Paquete Semanal is a roughly 1TB compilation of media, distributed weekly throughout Cuba via portable hard drives and USB memory sticks.

=== Iran ===
A weekly data dump compilation collected through the satellite system Toosheh.

=== North Korea ===
North Korean dissidents have been known to smuggle flash drives filled with western movies and television shows.

=== Pakistan ===
The May 2011 raid of Osama bin Laden's compound in Abbottabad, Pakistan, revealed that he used a series of USB thumb drives to store his email drafts. A courier of his would then take the saved emails to a nearby Internet cafe and send them out to the desired recipients.

=== South Africa ===
In September 2009, Durban company Unlimited IT reportedly pitted a messenger pigeon against South African ISP Telkom to transfer 4 GB of data 60 miles (97 km) from Howick to Durban. The pigeon, carrying the data on a memory stick, arrived in one hour eight minutes, with the data taking another hour to read from the memory stick. During the same two-hour period, only about 4.2% of the data had been transferred over the ADSL link. A similar experiment was conducted in England in September 2010; the "pigeonnet" also proved superior. In November 2009 the Australian comedy/current-affairs television program Hungry Beast repeated this experiment. The experiment had the team transfer a 700 MB file via three delivery methods to determine which was the fastest; A carrier pigeon with a microSD card, a car carrying a USB Stick, or a Telstra ADSL line. The data was to be transferred a distance of 132 kilometres (82 mi) by road. The pigeon won the race with a time of approximately 1 hour 5 minutes, the car came in second at 2 hours 10 minutes, while the internet transfer did not finish, having dropped out a second time and not come back.

Wizzy Digital Courier provided Internet access to schools in South Africa with poor or no network connectivity by implementing UUCP on USB memory sticks. This allowed offline cached email transport and scoops of web pages to back-fill a web cache.

=== United States ===
Google has used a sneakernet to transport large datasets, including 120 TB of data from the Hubble Space Telescope. Users of Google Cloud can import their data into Google Cloud Storage through sneakernet.

Oracle similarly offers its Data Transfer Service to customers to migrate data to Oracle Cloud Infrastructure or export data from it.

The SETI@home project uses a sneakernet to overcome bandwidth limitations: data recorded by the radio telescope in Arecibo, Puerto Rico was stored on magnetic tapes which were then shipped to Berkeley, California, for processing. In 2005, Jim Gray reported sending hard drives and even "metal boxes with processors" to transport large amounts of data by postal mail.

Very Long Baseline Interferometry performed using the Very Long Baseline Array ships hard drives to a data reduction site in Socorro, New Mexico. They refer to their data transfer mechanism as "HDOA" (Hard Drives On Airplane).

Data analytics teams in the financial services sector often use sneakernets to transfer sensitive corporate information and information obtained from data mining, such as ledger entries, customer data and financial statistics. There are several reasons for this: firstly, sneakernets can generally provide very high security (and possibly more importantly, they are perceived to be secure) due to the impossibility of a man-in-the-middle attack or packet sniffing; secondly, the volumes of data concerned are often extremely high; and thirdly, setting up secure network links between the client business and the analytics team's facilities is often either impossible or an extremely convoluted process.

In 2015 Amazon Web Services launched AWS Snowball, a 50 lb (23 kg), 50 TB device for transporting data to the AWS cloud; and in 2016 AWS Snowmobile, a truck to transport up to 100 PB of data in one load. For similar reasons, there is also a Google Transfer Appliance, an IBM Cloud Mass Data Migration device, and Microsoft's Azure Data Box Disk service.

Observation data from the Event Horizon Telescope is collected on hard drives which are transported by commercial freight airplanes from the various telescopes to the MIT Haystack Observatory and the Max Planck Institute for Radio Astronomy, where the data is analyzed.

=== USSR ===
In the later years of the USSR, the operating system called DEMOS was created and adapted for many types of Soviet computers by cloning versions of UNIX that were brought into the USSR on magnetic tapes, bypassing the Iron Curtain. This allowed for the building of Relcom, a country-wide UUCP network with global Usenet access for Soviet users. This in turn led to the registration of the .su ("Soviet Union") top level domain in 1990.

== In media ==
=== Non-fiction ===
There's a lot of band-width in a station wagon.

— Fred Gruenberger, Computing: A Second Course

The first USENET citation is July 16, 1985, and it was widely considered an old joke already.

Never underestimate the bandwidth of a station wagon full of tapes hurtling down the highway.

— Andrew S. Tanenbaum

Other alleged speakers included Tom Reidel, Warren Jackson, or Bob Sutterfield.

Although the station wagon transporting magnetic tapes is generally considered the canonical version, variants using trucks or Boeing 747s or C-5s and later storage technologies such as CD-ROMs, DVDs, Blu-rays, or SD Cards have frequently appeared.

The very first problem in Andrew S. Tanenbaum's 1981 textbook Computer Networks asks the student to calculate the bandwidth of a St. Bernard carrying floppy disks.

=== Fiction ===
- In Minority Report, the computer center of the "Precrime" police division operates by transferring data from one console to another using a thin, flat storage device.
- The Terry Pratchett novel Going Postal (2004) includes a contest between a horse-drawn mail coach and the "Grand Trunk Clacks" (a semaphore line) to see which is faster to transmit the contents of a book to a remote destination.
- William Gibson's novel Spook Country (2007) also features sneakernets, with iPods being the storage device used to clandestinely move information.
- In Cory Doctorow's novel Little Brother, the main character uses the term sneakernet to describe how he and his friends distribute the fictitious XNet software for encrypted communications.

== Similar concepts ==
- Delay-tolerant networks, such as the Haggle project at Cambridge University.
- IP over Avian Carriers (RFC 1149), an April Fools' Day RFC describing the transmission of messages via homing pigeon.

== See also ==
- Air gap (networking)
- Darknet
- Data Mule
- IP over Avian Carriers
- Jargon File
- Meatspace
- Pod slurping
- Sideloading
- Twilight (warez)
- USB dead drop
