= IP over Avian Carriers =

Proposal to carry IP traffic by birds

Under RFC 1149, a homing pigeon can carry Internet Protocol traffic.

In computer networking, IP over Avian Carriers (IPoAC) is an April Fools joke and a semi-serious network transfer proposal as a method to carry Internet Protocol (IP) traffic utilizing pigeon post. IP over Avian Carriers was initially described in RFC 1149 issued by the Internet Engineering Task Force, written by David Waitzman, and released on April 1, 1990. It is one of several April Fools' Day Request for Comments.

Waitzman described an improvement of his protocol in RFC 2549, IP over Avian Carriers with Quality of Service (1 April 1999). Later, in RFC 6214—released on 1 April 2011, and 13 years after the introduction of IPv6—Brian Carpenter and Robert Hinden published Adaptation of RFC 1149 for IPv6.

IPoAC has been successfully implemented, but for only nine packets of data, with a packet loss ratio of 55% (due to operator error), and a response time ranging from 3,000 seconds (50 min) to over 6,000 seconds (100 min), showing a flaw due to extremely high latency.

== Real-life implementation ==
On 28 April 2001, IPoAC was implemented by the Bergen Linux user group, under the name CPIP (Carrier Pigeon Internet Protocol). They sent nine packets over a straight-line distance of approximately 3 km (2 mi), each carried by an individual pigeon and containing one ping (ICMP echo request), and received four responses.

Script started on Sat Apr 28 11:24:09 2001
$ /sbin/ifconfig tun0
tun0      Link encap:Point-to-Point Protocol
          inet addr:10.0.3.2  P-t-P:10.0.3.1  Mask:255.255.255.255
          UP POINTOPOINT RUNNING NOARP MULTICAST  MTU:150  Metric:1
          RX packets:1 errors:0 dropped:0 overruns:0 frame:0
          TX packets:2 errors:0 dropped:0 overruns:0 carrier:0
          collisions:0
          RX bytes:88 (88.0 b)  TX bytes:168 (168.0 b)

$ ping -c 9 -i 900 10.0.3.1
PING 10.0.3.1 (10.0.3.1): 56 data bytes
64 bytes from 10.0.3.1: icmp_seq=0 ttl=255 time=6165731.1 ms
64 bytes from 10.0.3.1: icmp_seq=4 ttl=255 time=3211900.8 ms
64 bytes from 10.0.3.1: icmp_seq=2 ttl=255 time=5124922.8 ms
64 bytes from 10.0.3.1: icmp_seq=1 ttl=255 time=6388671.9 ms

--- 10.0.3.1 ping statistics ---
9 packets transmitted, 4 packets received, 55% packet loss
round-trip min/avg/max = 3211900.8/5222806.6/6388671.9 ms

Script done on Sat Apr 28 14:14:28 2001

One of these packets was presented to Waitzman in 2001, and would be auctioned on Christie's in 2026, with the final bid of $20,480.00 USD.

IPoAC and the 2001 implementation was mentioned by the French member of parliament Martine Billard in the French National Assembly, during debates about HADOPI.

== Risks ==
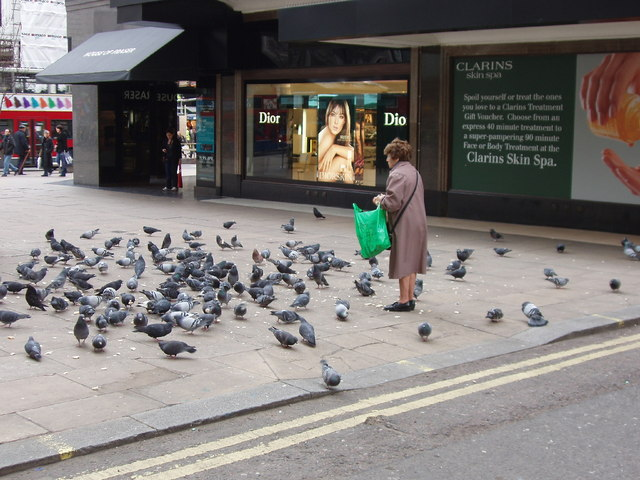
Example of a supposed man-in-the-middle attack

In December 2005, a Gartner report on bird flu that concluded "A pandemic wouldn't affect IT systems directly" was humorously criticized for neglecting to consider RFC 1149 and RFC 2549 in its analysis.

Common hazards to this system that could cause packet loss:

- Carriers being attacked by birds of prey. RFC2549: "Unintentional encapsulation in hawks has been known to occur, with decapsulation being messy and the packets mangled."
- Carriers being blown off course. RFC1149: "While broadcasting is not specified, storms can cause data loss."
- The absence of viable local carriers. RFC6214: "In some locations, such as New Zealand, a significant proportion of carriers are only able to execute short hops, and only at times when the background level of photon emission is extremely low." This describes the flightless and nocturnal nature of kiwi.
- Loss of availability of species (i.e. the extinction of the passenger pigeon).
- Disease affecting the carriers. RFC6214: "There is a known risk of infection by the so-called H5N1 virus."
- The network topologies supported for multicast communication are limited by the homing abilities of carriers. RFC6214: "... [carriers] prove to have no talent for multihoming, and in fact enter a routing loop whenever multihoming is attempted."
- Carriers are susceptible to the man in the middle attack (via physical interception).

== Other avian data transfer methods ==
Rafting photographers already use pigeons as a sneakernet to transport digital photos on flash media from the camera to the tour operator. Over a 30-mile (48 km) distance, a single pigeon may be able to carry tens of gigabytes of data in around an hour, which on an average bandwidth basis compared very favorably to early ADSL standards, even when accounting for lost drives.

On March 12, 2004, Yossi Vardi, Ami Ben-Bassat, and Guy Vardi sent three homing pigeons a distance of 100 kilometres (62 mi), "each carrying 20–22 tiny memory cards containing 1.3 GB, amounting in total of 4 GB of data." An effective throughput of 2.27 Mbit/s was achieved. The purpose of the test was to measure and confirm an improvement over RFC 2549.

Inspired by RFC 2549, on 9 September 2009, the marketing team of The Unlimited, a regional company in South Africa, decided to host a tongue-in-cheek pigeon race between their pet pigeon Winston and local telecom company Telkom SA. The race was to send 4 gigabytes of data from Howick to Hillcrest, approximately 60 kilometres (37 mi) apart. The pigeon carried a microSD card and competed against a Telkom ADSL line. Winston beat the data transfer over Telkom's ADSL line, with a total time of two hours, six minutes and 57 seconds from uploading data on the microSD card to completion of download from the card. At the time of Winston's victory, the ADSL transfer was just under 4% complete.

In November 2009, the Australian comedy/current-affairs television program Hungry Beast repeated this experiment. The Hungry Beast team took up the challenge after a parliament session wherein the government of the time criticised the opposition for not supporting telecommunications investments, saying that if the opposition had their way, Australians would be doing data transfer over carrier pigeons. The Hungry Beast team had read about the South African experiment and assumed that, as a developed Western country, Australia would have higher speeds. The experiment had the team transfer a 700 MB file via three delivery methods to determine which was the fastest: a carrier pigeon with a microSD card, a car carrying a USB stick, and a Telstra (Australia's largest telecom provider) ADSL line. The data was to be transferred from Tarana in rural New South Wales to the western-Sydney suburb of Prospect, New South Wales, a distance of 132 kilometres (82 mi) by road. Approximately halfway through the race, the internet connection unexpectedly dropped, and the transfer had to be restarted. The pigeon won the race with a time of approximately 1 hour 5 minutes; the car came in second at 2 hours 10 minutes, while the internet transfer did not finish, having dropped out a second time and not coming back. The estimated time to upload completion at one point was as high as 9 hours, and at no point did the estimated upload time fall below 4 hours.

A similar pigeon race was conducted in September 2010 by tech blogger (trefor.net) and ISP Timico CTO Trefor Davies with farmer Michelle Brumfield in rural Yorkshire, England: delivering a five-minute video to a BBC correspondent 75 miles away in Skegness. The pigeon (carrying a memory card with a 300 MB HD video of Davies having a haircut) was pitted against an upload to YouTube via British Telecom broadband; the pigeon was released at 11:05 am and arrived in the loft one hour and fifteen minutes later while the upload was still incomplete, having failed once in the interim.

== See also ==
- Hyper Text Coffee Pot Control Protocol – April Fool's joke about facetious communications protocol
- Pigeon post – Use of homing pigeons to carry messages
- Semaphore Flag Signaling System – Joke proposal to carry internet protocol by Semaphores
- Sneakernet – Informal term for the transfer of electronic information by physically moving media
