= Twilight (warez) =

Dutch series of monthly warez CD-ROMs and DVDs

Twilight was a Dutch series of monthly warez CD-ROMs and DVDs. The series ran from early 1996 until June 16, 2001. In 2003, "B.G." (full name undisclosed) was convicted for copyright infringements related to the Twilight series, as well as associated violence relating to the discs' production. The court estimated he had earned approximately 1,678,215 Euro with the series in question as well as others. The series was originally distributed from out of the Netherlands, but later appeared in many European countries as well.

In 2012, an independently operated website called twilight-cd.com began cataloging the history of the Twilight discs.

== History ==
During the period when the series began, CD writers and recordable CDs were still rare and expensive, while the internet was not yet mature for large file transfers as Internet users at the time used dial-up or ISDN modems, and file sharing and P2P networks were still small and insignificant. The original Twilight CDs, which were professionally pressed, could be ordered over the internet in addition to being purchased in stores, creating a profitable income for the disc creators. In turn, the discs were copied and resold by people unrelated to the original distribution as well as shared over the Usenet, which drew the ire from the Twilight disc creators, as it created an inverse proportionality between the sales of CD-ROMs and the speeds of the Internet.

== Organisation ==
The Twilight discs were created by an organization led by two men known as "B.G.", also known as "De Oorbel" (Dutch for "the Earring", a reference to software piracy) from the village of Soest, Netherlands, and "M.S.", also known as "Idi". The organization also produced and distributed other illegal software packages, branded as Crazybytes, as well as music and films, under the Moviebox name. The CD-ROMs were professionally pressed in large quantities.

Crazybytes were sold in 1996 and was sold from Enschede, Netherlands by Gerrit D., Gerbert D., Mark B., and Jan W. (last names undisclosed); they were reported to police in 1997, but the person who tipped the authorities was allegedly attacked in 1999; the beatings remain uninvestigated.

== Lawsuit and convictions ==
In 2002 an investigation was started into the source of the Twilight, Crazybytes and Moviebox series. The official estimation of the Dutch attorney general was that in total around 400,000 copies were pressed and sold. The price of a single release was between 20 and 40 Euro. In 2003 "B.G.", "M.S." and an unnamed party were convicted for physical assault and sentenced five years in prison for kidnapping, assault and extortion of a previous member of their organization, "Flappie" and his friend, who had tried to start a rival warez distribution network. In another trial that year, "B.G." was convicted for copyright infringement and constituting "a major disruption of public order". He as well as the general attorney appealed. In 2007 he was finally convicted. It was established that he had to refund 90% of the estimated profits, around 1,5 million Euro. Consequently, three students were convicted for copyright infringements and participation in a criminal organisation by illegally downloading programs using fast university networks to which they had access, as well as breaking the protections of the applications. They were given suspended sentences as well as fines of around 10,000 Euro.

== See also ==
- Sneakernet
- El Paquete Semanal
