= HTTP 451 =

HTTP status code

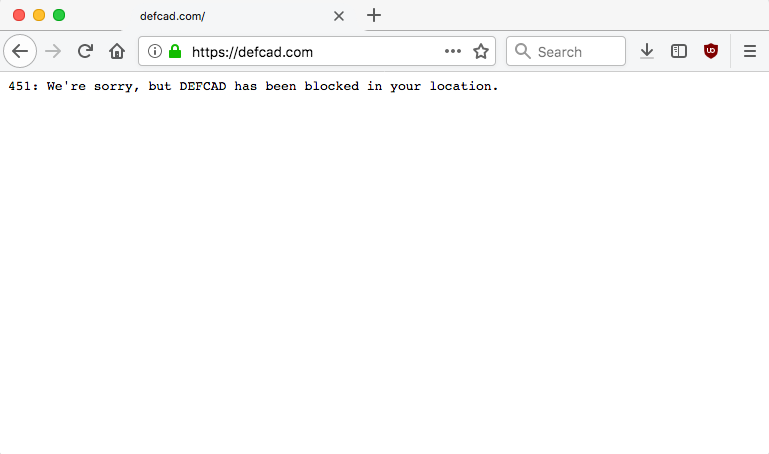
A 451 status code returned by the Defense Distributed website to a client in Pennsylvania, 30 July 2018.

In HTTP, HTTP 451 Unavailable For Legal Reasons is a response status code that indicates that a request cannot be satisfied for legal reasons, such as a web page censored by a government. The code value refers to Ray Bradbury's 1953 dystopian novel Fahrenheit 451, in which books are outlawed. 451 provides more information than HTTP 403, which is often used for the same purpose. This status code is currently a proposed standard in RFC 7725, which updated the IANA HTTP Status Codes Registry to include 451.

Examples of situations where an 451 could be used include web pages deemed a danger to national security, or web pages deemed to violate copyright, privacy, blasphemy laws, or any other law or court order.

After introduction of the General Data Protection Regulation (GDPR) in the European Economic Area (EEA) it became common practice for websites located outside the EEA to respond with 451 to EEA visitors instead of trying to comply with this new privacy law. For instance, many regional U.S. news sites no longer serve web browsers from the EU.

The RFC is specific that a 451 response does not indicate whether the resource exists but requests for it have been blocked, if the resource has been removed for legal reasons and no longer exists, or even if the resource has never existed, but any discussion of its topic has been legally forbidden (see injunction). Some sites have previously returned HTTP 404 (missing) or similar if they are not legally permitted to disclose that the resource has been removed. It is used in the United Kingdom by some Internet service providers utilising the Internet Watch Foundation blacklist, returning a 404 message or another error message instead of showing a message indicating the site is blocked.

The status code was formally proposed in 2013 by Tim Bray, following earlier informal proposals by Chris Applegate in 2008 and Terence Eden in 2012. It was approved by the Internet Engineering Task Force (IETF) on 18 December 2015. It was published as in the Proposed Standard RFC 7725 in February 2016.

== Usage ==
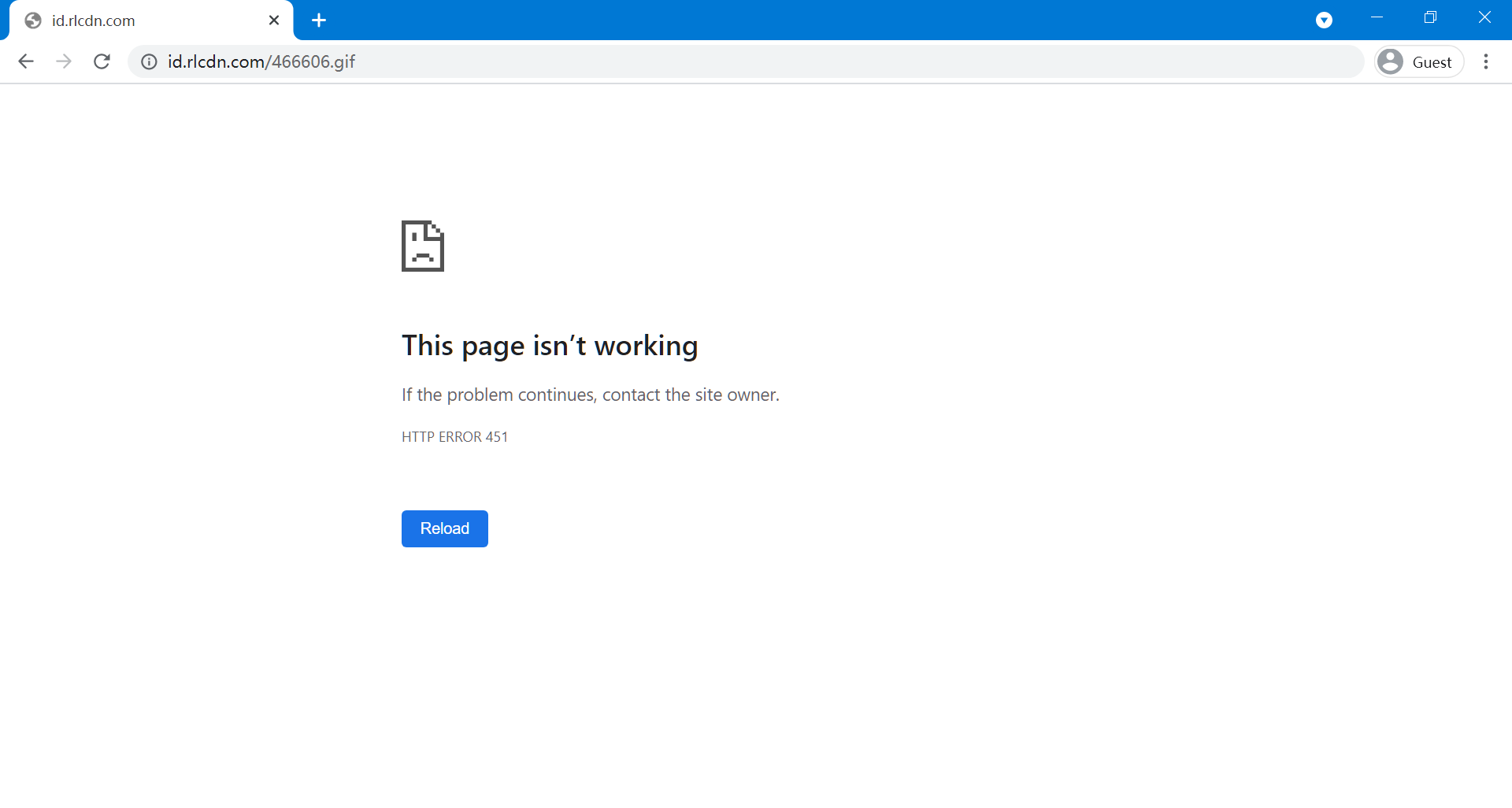
A 451 error message being displayed when visiting a website in mainland China

When an entity intercepts the request and returns status 451, it should include a "Link" HTTP header field whose value is a URI reference identifying itself. The "Link" header field must then have a "rel" parameter whose value is "blocked-by". This is intended to identify the entity implementing the blocking (an ISP, DNS provider, caching system, etc.), not the legal authority mandating the block. At an IETF hackathon, participants used a web crawler to discover that several implementations misunderstood this header and gave the legal authority instead.

=== Additional uses ===
The meaning of "a resource which cannot be served for legal reasons" has been interpreted to extend beyond government censorship:

- When content cannot be shown in the user's country, due to contractual or licensing restrictions with the content owner, for example, a TV program may not be available to users in some countries.
- When a publisher refuses to serve content to a user, because the user's country adds regulatory requirements that the publisher refuses to comply with, e.g. websites based outside of the EU may refuse to serve users in the EU because they do not want to comply with the GDPR.

== Other Usages ==
Also used by Exchange ActiveSync when either a more efficient server is available or the server cannot access the users' mailbox. The client is expected to re-run the HTTP AutoDiscover operation to find a more appropriate server.

== Example ==
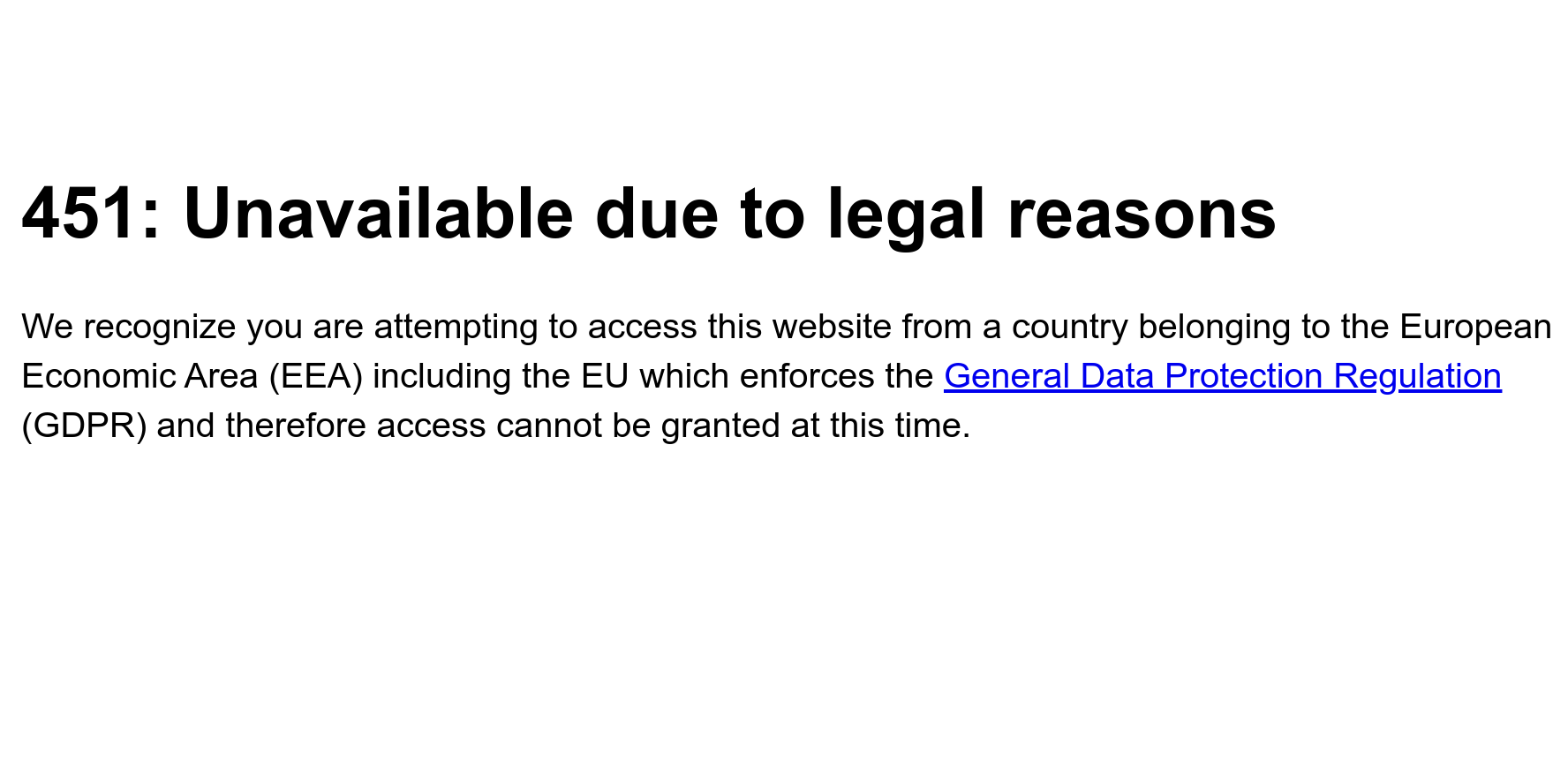
An American website not served to European users to avoid compliance with the GDPR.

HTTP/1.1 451 Unavailable For Legal Reasons
Link: <https://search.example.net/legal>; rel="blocked-by"
Content-Type: text/html

<html>
 <head><title>Unavailable For Legal Reasons</title></head>
 <body>
  <h1>Unavailable For Legal Reasons</h1>
  <p>This request may not be serviced in the Roman Province
  of Judea due to the Lex Julia Majestatis, which disallows
  access to resources hosted on servers deemed to be
  operated by the People's Front of Judea.</p>
 </body>
</html>

== In media ==
HTTP 451 was mentioned by the BBC's From Our Own Correspondent programme in 2017, as an indication of the effects of sanctions on Sudan and the inability to access Airbnb, the App Store, or other Western web services.

== See also ==
- Evil bit
- Gag order
- Superinjunction
- Technological fix
