= Evil bit =

Fictional IPv4 header field indicating malicious intent

The evil bit is a fictional IPv4 packet header field proposed in a humorous April Fools' Day RFC from 2003, authored by Steve Bellovin. The Request for Comments recommended that the last remaining unused bit, the "Reserved Bit" in the IPv4 packet header, be used to indicate whether a packet had been sent with malicious intent, thus making computer security engineering an easy problem – simply ignore any messages with the evil bit set and trust the rest.

== Impact ==
A 2015 research done by network engineer Ben Cartwright-Cox revealed that a number of popular websites (436 websites out of Alexa 20k at the time), such as those belonging to several universities and banks, to antivirus provider Kaspersky and to remote desktop software provider TeamViewer respect the "evil bit" by dropping the inbound request, making them compliant with RFC 3514.

== Influence ==
The evil bit has become a synonym for all attempts to seek simple technical solutions for difficult human social problems which require the willing participation of malicious actors, in particular efforts to implement Internet censorship using simple technical solutions.

As a joke, FreeBSD implemented support for the evil bit that day, but removed the changes the next day. A Linux patch implementing the iptables module "ipt_evil" was posted the next year. Furthermore, a patch for FreeBSD 7 is available, and is kept up-to-date.

There is an extension for XMPP protocol, inspired by evil bit.

This RFC has also been quoted in the otherwise completely serious RFC 3675, ".sex Considered Dangerous", which may have caused the proponents of .xxx to wonder whether the Internet Engineering Task Force (IETF) was commenting on their application for a top-level domain (TLD) – the document was not related to their application.

For April Fool's 2010, Google added an &evil=true parameter to requests through the Ajax APIs.

Wireshark supports RFC 3514 since version 1.4.0 (2010) when the ip.security_flag protocol preference is enabled.

== See also ==
- Technological fix
- Do Not Track
- HTTP 451
- Twit bit, used in early shadow banning.
