= El Paquete Semanal =

Underground content market

El Paquete Semanal ("The Weekly Package") or El Paquete is a one terabyte collection of digital material distributed since around 2008 on the underground market in Cuba as a substitute for broadband Internet. Since 2015, it has been the primary source of entertainment for millions of Cubans, as Internet in Cuba has been suppressed for many years with only about a 38.8% Internet penetration rate as of 2018. El Paquete Semanal has its own page that is running in the United States, where one can view its contents and is consistently updated every week.

== Cuban government ==
According to El Paquete Semanal, by Michaelanne Dye, et al., anywhere from a 5-25% of the population had access to the internet. It is also said that, "Cuba was one of the first 'developing' countries to connect to the WWW."

The Cuban Government has also been investing in more internet access for the people, with the use of ETECSA, a service that the citizens could pay 1 CUC (equivalent to an American Dollar) for one hour of internet use. This has become the most popular method for people to become connected to the internet, mainly used to connect to social media, such as Facebook.

== El Paquete content ==
Currently, an archive of the weekly packages can be found online, where users can view the content of upcoming and past packages before they obtain the actual package. The most popular content is TV series, soap operas, music, films, and the illegal classifieds but El Paquete Semanal also contains video clips, Spanish language news websites, computer technology websites, instructional videos, software, and advertisements for local Cuban businesses. Most buyers request only certain parts of the Package which may sell for as little as $1 US.

Since a 2011 legal property reform regarding private enterprise, a Cuban advertising firm called Etres has used the new regulations surrounding advertising to legally charge local businesses a small fee to arrange for a short clip or poster promoting their establishment to feature in the Package.

It is still unknown who compiles the material or from where it was obtained. Some have theorized that the lack of pornographic material and lack of anti-government views in the package may indicate the Cuban government is involved in its production.

== Anti-Paquete ==
One way the government has attempted to deal with the spreading of El Paquete is by creating their own pirated media source mimicking El Paquete called Mochila or Maletín, which means "bookbag" in English. This media package offered classical movies, music, and educational materials, but was ultimately very unpopular.

== See also ==
- Sneakernet
- Twilight (warez)
