= Semaphore Flag Signaling System =

Joke proposal to carry internet protocol by Semaphores

In computer networking, Semaphore Flag Signaling System (SFSS) is a humorous proposal to carry Internet Protocol (IP) traffic by semaphores. Semaphore Flag Signaling System was initially described in RFC 4824, an April Fools' Day RFC issued by the Internet Engineering Task Force edited by J. Hofmueller, et al. and released on April Fools' Day 2007. It is one of several April 1 RFCs.

== Reference implementation ==
A reference implementation of IP over SFS has been done by the authors of the RFC within the project "Talking the Fish". An email was transmitted using SMTP over Semaphore Flag Signals.

== See also ==
- IP over Avian Carriers, a similar humorous proposal
- Semaphore, for other kinds of semaphores
- Victorian Internet, for the serious relation between semaphore and the internet
- Free-space optical communication, a more effective method of high-speed communication using visible light in free space
- Optical telegraph
