= Flag semaphore =

System to transmit information by hand

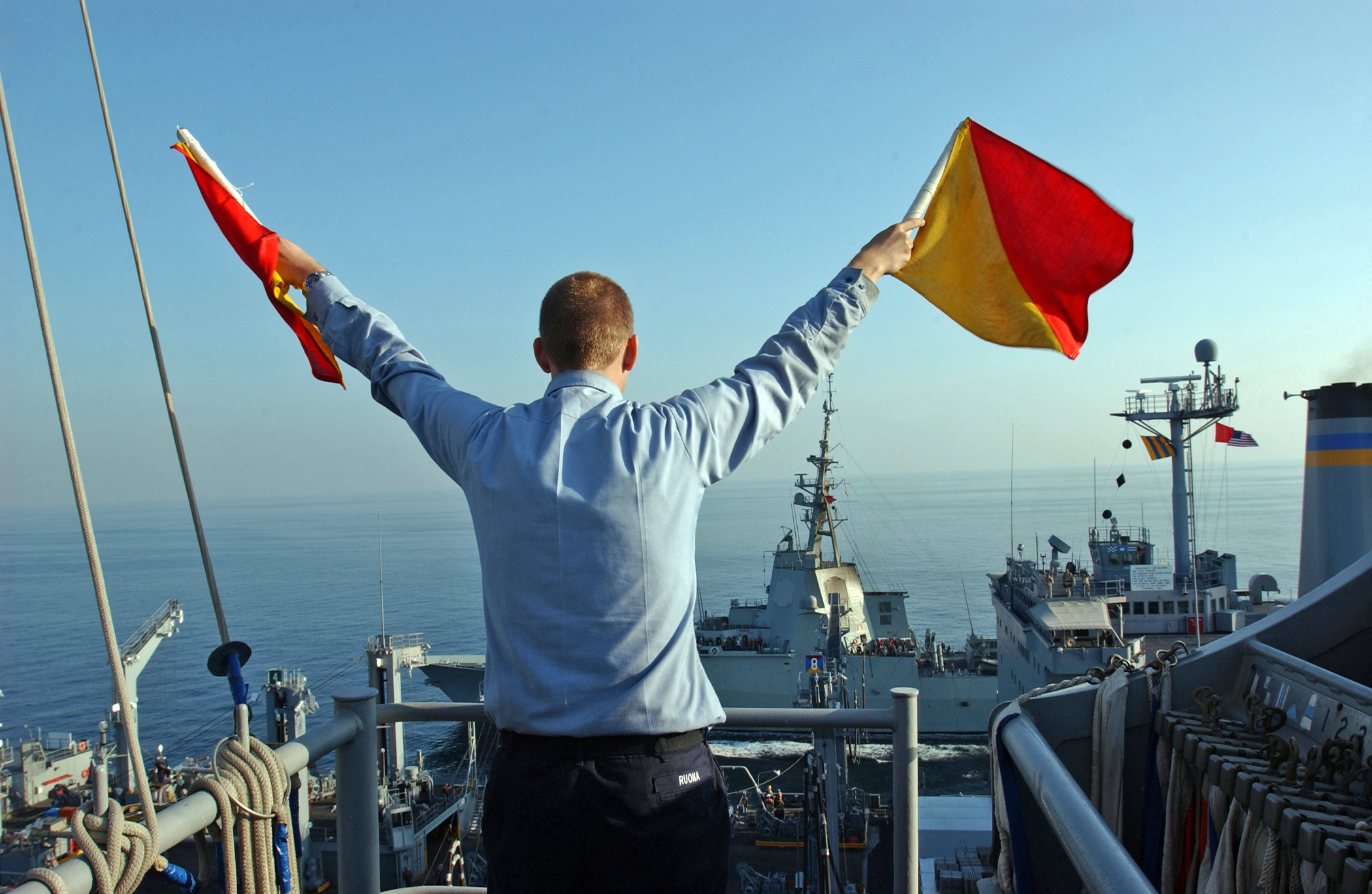
A US Navy crewman signals the letter 'U' using flag semaphore during an underway replenishment exercise (2005)

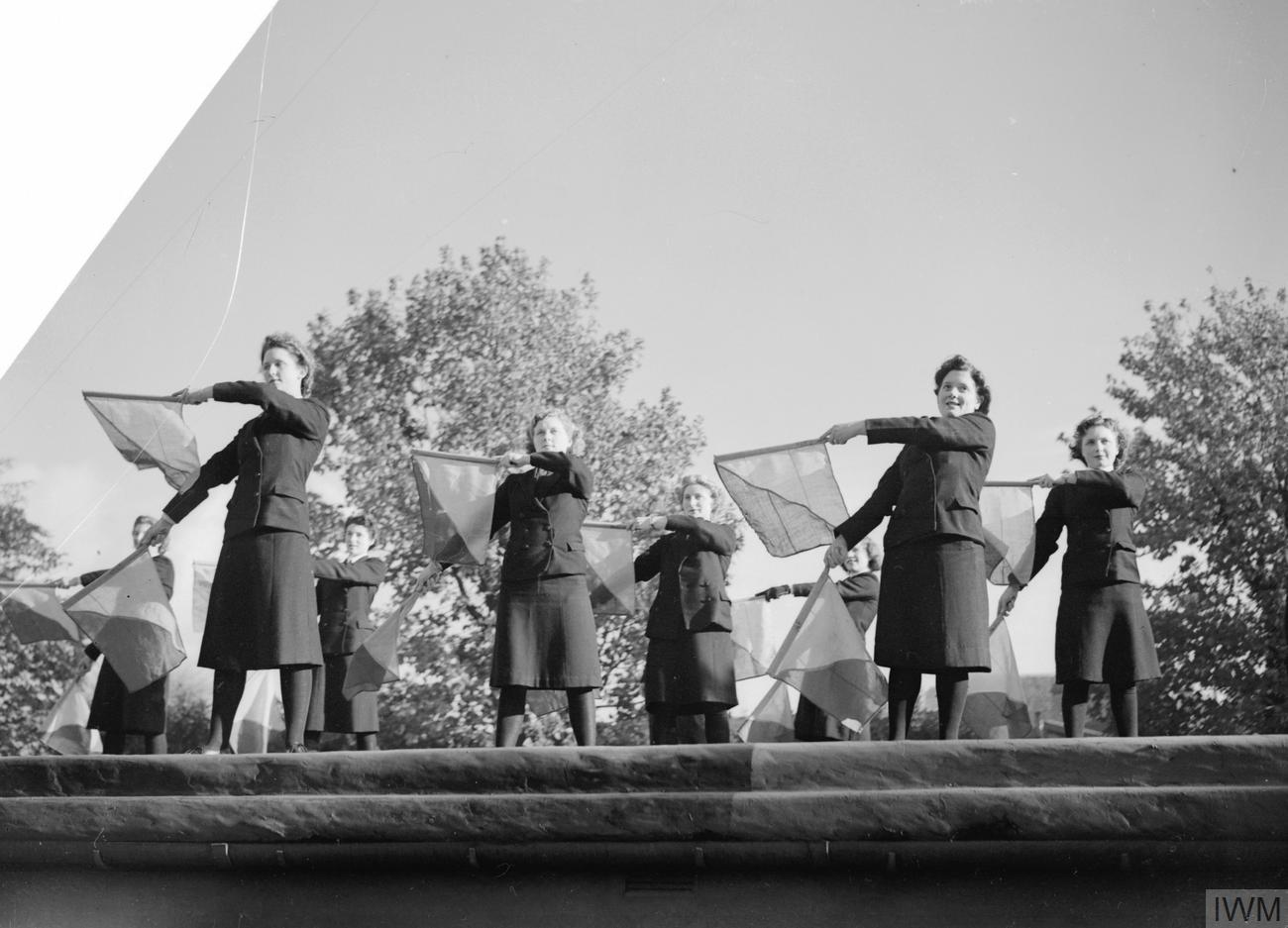
A signal class in Greenock, Scotland, October 1942

Flag semaphore (from the Ancient Greek σῆμα (sêma) 'sign' and -φέρω (-phero) '-bearer') is a semaphore system conveying information at a distance by means of visual signals with hand-held flags, rods, disks, paddles, or occasionally bare or gloved hands. Information is encoded by the position of the flags; it is read when the flag is in a fixed position. Semaphores were adopted and widely used (with hand-held flags replacing the mechanical arms of shutter semaphores) in the maritime world in the 19th century. It is still used during underway replenishment at sea and is acceptable for emergency communication in daylight or, using lighted wands instead of flags, at night.

== Contemporary semaphore flag system ==
The current flag semaphore system uses two short poles with square flags, which a signal person holds in different positions to signal letters of the alphabet and numbers. The signaller holds one pole in each hand, and extends each arm in one of eight possible directions. Except for in the rest position, the flags do not overlap. The flags are colored differently based on whether the signals are sent by sea or by land. At sea, the flags are colored red and yellow (the Oscar flag), while on land, they are white and blue (the Papa flag). Flags are not required; their purpose is to make the characters more obvious.

=== Characters ===
The following 30 semaphore characters are presented as they would appear when facing the signalperson:

A or 1

B or 2

C or 3
Acknowledge / Correct

D or 4

E or 5
Error (if signaled 8 times)

F or 6

G or 7

H or 8

I or 9

J
Letters to follow

K or 0

L

M

N

O

P

Q

R

S

T

U

V

W

X

Y

Z

Rest / Space

Numerals (#)

Error / Attention

Cancel / Annul
Disregard previous signal

Numbers can be signaled by first signaling "Numerals". Letters can be signaled by first signaling "J".

The sender uses the "Attention" signal to request permission to begin a transmission. The receiver uses a "Ready to receive" signal not shown above to grant permission to begin the transmission. The receiver raises both flags vertical overhead and then drops them to the rest position, once only, to grant permission to send. The sender ends the transmission with the "Ready to receive" signal. The receiver can reply with the "Attention" signal. At this point, sender and receiver change places.

== Origin ==
Flag semaphore originated in 1866 as a handheld version of the optical telegraph system of Home Riggs Popham used on land, and its later improvement by Charles Pasley. The land system consisted of lines of fixed stations (substantial buildings) with two large, moveable arms pivoted on an upright member. Such a system was inconvenient to install on board a ship. Flag semaphore provided an easy method of communicating ship-to-ship or ship-to-shore when the distances were not too great. According to Alexander J. Field of Santa Clara University, "there is evidence" that Popham based his telegraph on the French coastal stations used for ship-to-shore communication. Many of the codepoints of flag semaphore match those of the Foy-Breguet electrical telegraph, also descended from the French optical telegraph. Although based on the optical telegraph, by the time flag semaphore was introduced the optical telegraph had been entirely replaced by the electrical telegraph some years previously.

== Japanese semaphore ==
The combination used for オ ("O")

A Japanese man demonstrating flag semaphore, 2017

The Japanese merchant marine and armed services have adapted the flag semaphore system to the Japanese language. Because their writing system involves a syllabary of about twice the number of characters in the Latin alphabet, most characters take two displays of the flags to complete; others need three and a few only one. The flags are specified as a solid white rectangle for the left hand and a solid red one for the right. The display motions chosen are not like the "rotary dial" system used for the Latin alphabet letters and numbers; rather, the displays represent the angles of the brush strokes used in writing in the katakana syllabary and in the order drawn. For example, the character for "O" [オ], which is drawn first with a horizontal line from left to right, then a vertical one from top to bottom, and finally a slant between the two; follows that form and order of the arm extensions. It is the right arm, holding the red flag, which moves as a pen would, but in mirror image so that the observer sees the pattern normally. As in telegraphy, the katakana syllabary is the one used to write down the messages as they are received. Also, the Japanese system presents the number 0 by moving flags in a circle, and those from 1 through 9 using a sort of the "rotary dial" system, but different from that used for European languages.

Japanese flag signals with the associated kana
	–	k	s	t	n	h	m	y	r	w
a	あ ア	か カ	さ サ	た タ	な ナ	は ハ	ま マ	や ヤ	ら ラ	わ ワ
i	い イ	き キ	し シ	ち チ	に ニ	ひ ヒ	み ミ	*	り リ	ゐ ヰ
u	う ウ	く ク	す ス	つ ツ	ぬ ヌ	ふ フ	む ム	ゆ ユ	る ル	*
e	え エ	け ケ	せ セ	て テ	ね ネ	へ ヘ	め メ	*	れ レ	ゑ ヱ
o	お オ	こ コ	そ ソ	と ト	の ノ	ほ ホ	も モ	よ ヨ	ろ ロ	を ヲ

'n	Voiced	Semi-voiced
ん ン	◌゙	◌゚

== Practical use in communication ==
Semaphore flags are also sometimes used as means of communication in the mountains where oral or electronic communication is difficult to perform. Although they do not carry flags, the Royal Canadian Mounted Police officers have used hand semaphore in this manner. Some surf-side rescue companies, such as the Ocean City, Maryland Beach Patrol, use semaphore flags to communicate between lifeguards. The letters of the flag semaphore are also a common artistic motif. One enduring example is the peace symbol, adopted by the Campaign for Nuclear Disarmament in 1958 from the original logo created by a commercial artist named Gerald Holtom from Twickenham, London, using the semaphore for N and D. Holtom designed the logo for use on a protest march on the Atomic Weapons Establishment at Aldermaston, near Newbury, England. On 4 April 1958, the march left Trafalgar Square for rural Berkshire, carrying Ban the Bomb placards made by Holtom's children making it the first use of the symbol. Originally, it was purple and white and signified a combination of the semaphoric letters N and D, standing for "nuclear disarmament", circumscribed by a circle.

Along with Morse code, flag semaphore is currently used by the US Navy and also continues to be a subject of study and training for young people of Scouts. In a satirical nod to the flag semaphore's enduring use into the age of the Internet, on April Fools' Day 2007 the Internet Engineering Task Force standards organization outlined the Semaphore Flag Signaling System, a method of transmitting Internet traffic via a chain of flag semaphore operators.

== Use in popular culture ==
The album cover for the Beatles' 1965 album Help! was originally to have portrayed the four band members spelling "help" in semaphore, but the result was deemed aesthetically unpleasing, and their arms were instead positioned in a meaningless but aesthetically pleasing arrangement.

In the 1960s poet Hannah Weiner composed poems using flag semaphore and the International Code of Signals, including a version of William Shakespeare's Romeo and Juliet titled "R+J." In 1968, these works were performed by off-duty U.S. Coast Guard signalers in Central Park.

The second episode in the second series of Monty Python's Flying Circus depicted the Emily Brontë novel Wuthering Heights enacted in semaphore.

The Swallows and Amazons series by Arthur Ransome has the characters using flag semaphore to exchange messages, both live and as concealed messages in drawings (many of which are included in the books as illustrations) with the complete semaphore alphabet included as an illustration in both Winter Holiday and Secret Water.

The music video for the 2025 song "Static" by Flavor Foley (ft. Hatsune Miku) includes a scene where the character's arms spell out "Don't go," adding to the theme of the song.

The music video for the 2026 song "Signaling" by ABM (AnythingBecomeMoe) and TEKOKITO (ft. Hatsune Miku and Kasane Teto) includes multiple discussions in semaphore.

== See also ==
- Flag signals
- Heliograph
- International Code of Signals
- International maritime signal flags
- Railway signalling
- Aircraft marshalling
- Optical landing system
- Optical telegraph
- Signal lamp
- Substitute flag
- Traffic guard
