= April Fools' Day Request for Comments =

List of humorous technical standards proposals

A Request for Comments (RFC), in the context of Internet governance, is a type of publication from the Internet Engineering Task Force (IETF) and the Internet Society (ISOC), usually describing methods, behaviors, research, or innovations applicable to the working of the Internet and Internet-connected systems.

Almost every April Fools' Day (1 April) since 1989, the Internet RFC Editor has published one or more humorous Request for Comments (RFC) documents, following the June 1973 RFC 527 called ARPAWOCKY, a parody of Lewis Carroll's nonsense poem "Jabberwocky". The following list also includes humorous RFCs published on other dates.

== List of April Fools' Day RFCs ==
=== 1978 ===
- RFC 748 – "TELNET RANDOMLY-LOSE Option," Status Unknown.
  A parody of the TCP/IP documentation style. For a long time it was specially marked in the RFC index with "note date of issue".

=== 1989 ===
- RFC 1097 – "TELNET SUBLIMINAL-MESSAGE Option," Status Unknown.

=== 1990 ===
- RFC 1149 – "A Standard for the Transmission of IP Datagrams on Avian Carriers," Experimental.
  Updated by RFC 2549 in 1999; see below. Describes protocol for transmitting IP packets by homing pigeon.
  In 2001, RFC 1149 was actually implemented by members of the Bergen Linux User Group.
  See also RFC 6214, as noted below. Describes the adaptation of RFC 1149 for IPv6.

=== 1991 ===
- RFC 1216 – "Gigabit Network Economics and Paradigm Shifts," Informational.
  Addresses an ultra low speed communication method called ulsnet compared to the faster gigabits.
- RFC 1217 – "Memo from the Consortium for Slow Commotion Research (CSCR)," Informational.

=== 1992 ===
- RFC 1313 – "Today's Programming for KRFC AM 1313 Internet Talk Radio," Informational.

=== 1993 ===
- RFC 1437 – "The Extension of MIME Content-Types to a New Medium," Informational.
  Proposal to add sentient life forms such as humans in the MIME attachments
- RFC 1438 – "Internet Engineering Task Force Statements Of Boredom (SOBs)," Informational.

=== 1994 ===
- RFC 1605 – "SONET to Sonnet Translation," Informational.
  Attributed to William Shakespeare.
- RFC 1606 – "A Historical Perspective On The Usage Of IP Version 9," Informational.
- RFC 1607 – "A VIEW FROM THE 21ST CENTURY," Informational.
  A list of supposedly found email exchange from a person from 2023.

=== 1995 ===
- RFC 1776 – "The Address is the Message," Informational.

=== 1996 ===
- RFC 1924 – "A Compact Representation of IPv6 Addresses," Informational.
- RFC 1925 – "The Twelve Networking Truths," Informational.
- RFC 1926 – "An Experimental Encapsulation of IP Datagrams on Top of ATM," Informational.
- RFC 1927 – "Suggested Additional MIME Types for Associating Documents," Informational.
  Suggestion of actual staples and paper clips for MIME attachments

=== 1997 ===
- RFC 2100 – "The Naming of Hosts," Informational.
  A parody of the poem "The Naming of Cats" by T. S. Eliot.

=== 1998 ===
- RFC 2321 – "RITA -- The Reliable Internetwork Troubleshooting Agent," Informational.
- RFC 2322 – "Management of IP numbers by peg-dhcp," Informational.
  This RFC is not solely for entertainment; the described protocol has regularly been implemented at hacker events in Europe.
- RFC 2323 – "IETF Identification and Security Guidelines," Informational.
- RFC 2324 – "Hyper Text Coffee Pot Control Protocol (HTCPCP/1.0)," Informational. Updated by RFC 7168 in 2014.

- RFC 2325 – "Definitions of Managed Objects for Drip-Type Heated Beverage Hardware Devices using SMIv2," Informational.

=== 1999 ===
- RFC 2549 – "IP over Avian Carriers with Quality of Service," Informational. Updates RFC 1149.

- RFC 2550 – "Y10K and Beyond," Informational.
- RFC 2551 – "The Roman Standards Process -- Revision III (I April MCMXCIV)," Worst Current Practice. Obsoletes MCMXCIX.

=== 2000 ===
- RFC 2795 – "The Infinite Monkey Protocol Suite (IMPS)," Informational.
  Concerning the practicalities of the infinite monkey theorem.

=== 2001 ===
- RFC 3091 – "Pi Digit Generation Protocol," Informational.
- RFC 3092 – "Etymology of "Foo"," Informational.
- RFC 3093 – "Firewall Enhancement Protocol (FEP)," Informational.

=== 2002 ===
- RFC 3251 – "Electricity over IP," Informational.
  Parody of "Everything over IP and IP over Everything" and the 2000–2001 California electricity crisis.
- RFC 3252 – "Binary Lexical Octet Ad-hoc Transport," Informational.

=== 2003 ===
- RFC 3514 – "The Security Flag in the IPv4 Header," Informational.
  Proposal for the 'evil bit', as an option in the IPv4 packet header. Later, this became a synonym for all attempts to seek simple technical solutions for difficult human social problems which require the willing participation of malicious actors.

=== 2004 ===
- RFC 3751 – "Omniscience Protocol Requirements," Informational.

=== 2005 ===
- RFC 4041 – "Requirements for Morality Sections in Routing Area Drafts," Informational.
- RFC 4042 – "UTF-9 and UTF-18 Efficient Transformation Formats of Unicode," Informational.
  Encodes Unicode in nonets by encoding a octet, preceded by a continuation bit that tells the sender if there are any further bytes to process.
  Notable for containing PDP-10 assembly language code nearly 22 years after the manufacturer ceased production of the PDP-10, and for being technically possible, unlike many of these other proposals.
- RFC Draft: "IP over Burrito Carriers"
  An internet protocol recipe, to communicate while eating.

=== 2006 ===
An April 1 RFC was not published this year, but an announcement on the IETF list about the appointment of the Sesame Street character Bert as member of the IAB appears to have been the April Fools' Day 2006 stunt.

=== 2007 ===
- RFC 4824 – "The Transmission of IP Datagrams over the Semaphore Flag Signaling System (SFSS)," Informational.

=== 2008 ===
- RFC 5241 – "Naming Rights in IETF Protocols," Informational.
- RFC 5242 – "A Generalized Unified Character Code: Western European and CJK Sections," Informational.

=== 2009 ===
- RFC 5513 – "IANA Considerations for Three Letter Acronyms," Informational.
- RFC 5514 – "IPv6 over Social Networks," Experimental.
  Implemented on Facebook by the author, in the process of writing the RFC.

=== 2010 ===
- RFC 5841 – "TCP Option to Denote Packet Mood," Informational.

=== 2011 ===
- RFC 6214 – "Adaptation of RFC 1149 for IPv6," Informational.
  A long-awaited extension to the datalink layer protocols to help alleviate the (then) imminent depletion of IPv4 address space. As IPv6 has a significantly larger minimum link MTU, larger and more mature pidgeons are required to avoid undue packet loss. A minimum age of 1 year is suggested. Both younger and elderly birds should be selected when transporting smaller IPv4 packets in dual-stack implementations. As a security, and in hindsight visionary, consideration, provisions should be made to cope with infection of the H5N1 virus, as this hampers deployment in today's Internet.

- RFC 6217 – "Regional Broadcast Using an Atmospheric Link Layer," Experimental.

=== 2012 ===
- RFC 6592 – "The Null Packet," Informational.
  Although mentioned in several networking protocols (like MPEG-2, RTP, or RTCP) the Null Packet has never been formally defined. This RFC corrects that omission by providing an empty definition. Null packets are zero-dimensional, zero length, benign packets (i.e. lacking an Evil bit), that can be quite elusive. Interestingly, the rate at which Null Packets are sent does not increase the bit rate of the Null Packet traffic.
- RFC 6593 – "Service Undiscovery Using Hide-and-Go-Seek for the Domain Pseudonym System (DPS)," Informational.
  Most services eagerly choose to be fully visible in the network so users may find them easily (by means of one of the many service discovery techniques), but "an apathetic, playful, overwhelmed, or shy service might prefer a hide or hint engagement, instead of directly showing itself." To do so, this RFC introduces a hide-and-seek paradigm, where the service (the "hider") has the option of several techniques for hiding from the client (in this scenario called "it"). DPS packets are sent over TCP with the Mood set to 'Sneaky' (see RFC 5841 above) and with their Evil bit set (see RFC 3514 above). The latter now ambiguously means "I am not sure" to further enhance the protocol.

=== 2013 ===
- RFC 6919 – "Further Key Words for Use in RFCs to Indicate Requirement Levels," Experimental.
  Enhances the ability of the RFC's author to also convey intention and purpose in a more informal way, with (in)directive key words, like: "MUST (BUT WE KNOW YOU WON'T)" (when you know beforehand you will be ignored, but to come out morally superior anyway) and "REALLY SHOULD NOT" (when it is to be expected that 'boys will be boys').
- RFC 6921 – "Design Considerations for Faster-Than-Light (FTL) Communication," Informational.
  When it becomes possible to send packets over the Internet faster than light, they may be received before they are sent (due to time reversal), which will have major impact on many protocols in use today. With sufficient speed (and corresponding negative time shift), a complete communication may have taken place before it even has started. The RFC reviews the design principles of those protocols, to prevent future breakdown of communication. Most likely, we should have started upgrading them yesterday.

=== 2014 ===
- RFC 7168 – "The Hyper Text Coffee Pot Control Protocol for Tea Efflux Appliances (HTCPCP-TEA)," Informational.
  Updates RFC 2324 for coffee machines which are also capable of brewing tea. Also defines the HTTP response code 418 I'm a Teapot, for teapots to use when unable to brew coffee.

- RFC 7169 – "The NSA (No Secrecy Afforded) Certificate Extension," Informational.
  Although generally unwanted, private key counterparts of X509 digital certificates may have been or have been shared with a third party, for lawful interception or other reasons. Users may now be notified of this fact with a new certificate extension, specifying the boolean value ext-KeyUsage. When 'true', the private key has been shared; when 'false', the signer abstains from commenting on whether or not sharing has taken place.

=== 2015 ===
- RFC 7511 – "Scenic Routing for IPv6," Experimental.
  Green IT has become increasingly important. In a win-win proposition, for packets and the environment alike, this RFC defines a way to allow packets to be routed through the air, to get as much sunlight and fresh air possible. Sending packets over Wi-Fi or by pigeons will help them escape their torturous routine of assembly and disassembly, and being shot through dark fibers and copper cables all the time.
- RFC 7514 – "Really Explicit Congestion Notification (RECN)," Experimental.
  An RECN message SHOULD be sent by a router in response to a host that is generating traffic at a rate persistently unfair to other competing flows and that has not reacted to previous packet losses or ECN marks.
  — RFC 7514
  In an approach similar to the now deprecated ICMP Source Quench, it reuses that packet's 'Type' field (4) to tell the sender (really more explicitly than ECN) to shut up. The user responsible for the traffic MUST be made aware of the contents of an RECN message by means of text-to-speech, or pop-ups if the audio channel is muted.

=== 2016 ===
An April 1 RFC was not published this year.

=== 2017 ===
- RFC 8135 – "Complex Addressing in IPv6," Experimental.
  Takes a rather mathematical approach to use the 128-bit IPv6 address space in other ways than the traditional one, to ultimately arrive at Complex Addresses. You may use the imaginary part of a complex address (with polar coordinates as the real part) to reach Santa Claus, for example. It also proposes to use Flying Addresses for end hosts using IP over avian carriers.
- RFC 8136 – "Additional Transition Functionality for IPv6," Informational.
  As the Internet Architecture Board intends to relax requirements for compatibility with IPv4 for new or extended protocols, this RFC helps the adoption of IPv6 by setting the evil bit for all IPv4 packets to 1, making sure that dual stack hosts will favor IPv6, as will the Happy Eyeballs algorithm. To maintain functional equivalence between IPv4 and IPv6, the 'security flag' of RFC 3514 should be included in the IPv6 header. Advanced security options may be specified in a new hop-by-hop option header.
- RFC 8140 – "The Arte of ASCII: Or, An True and Accurate Representation of an Menagerie of Thynges Fabulous and Wonderful in Ye Forme of Character," Informational.
  ASCII art in its most splendid form. Depicts and annotates fruit bats, the Loch Ness monster, some fundamental Bauhaus elements, and even a flock of avian carriers.

=== 2018 ===
- RFC 8367 – "Wrongful Termination of Internet Protocol (IP) Packets," Informational.
  A heartfelt cry to end packet discrimination at the IP level, where they frequently (even in this day and age) are terminated prematurely, based on color, length, age, etcetera, or even by IP version!
- RFC 8369 – "Internationalizing IPv6 Using 128-Bit Unicode," Informational.
  Proposes to use 128-bit Unicode to facilitate internationalization of IPv6, since the 1.114.112 code points of the current implementation of Unicode is deemed insufficient for the future. IPv6 addresses may be represented by a single U+128 glyph, to reduce stress on the eyes of network administrators.
  If implemented, it would obsolete RFC 8135, because "[i]t was found to be too complex to implement anyway".

=== 2019 ===
- RFC 8565 – "Hypertext Jeopardy Protocol (HTJP/1.0)," Informational.
  A 'response/request' protocol similar to HTTP/1.1 but where clients send a response to the server (e.g. "Hello World. My payload includes a trailing CRLF.") to which the server answers with a request (e.g. GET /hello.txt), like in the Jeopardy! game. The Hypertext Double Jeopardy Protocol (HTJ2P) (described in Appendix A) inverses the semantics of HTJP again.
- RFC 8567 – "Customer Management DNS Resource Records," Informational.
  The authors contend that the DNS (secured with DNSSEC) is most suited to globally and reliably provide information to help maintain a high quality of experience for CPE (among others). With the definition of four new DNS RR types (password, credit card number, social security number, and an SSN pointer record) they hope to create end-to-end, holistic network management.

=== 2020 ===
- RFC 8771 – "The Internationalized Deliberately Unreadable Network NOtation (I-DUNNO)," Experimental.
  A proposal to use UTF-8 to obfuscate (and help replace) textual IP addresses, to coerce a small minority of people to use the DNS instead of sticking to (and mixing up) plain IP addresses.
- RFC 8774 – "The Quantum Bug," Informational.
  Dismisses RFC 6921 with the notion that considering time travel for faster-than-light packet delivery is "amusing" but impossible as a concept. Instead, it focuses on real life quantum entanglement in relation to packet round trip times, which (depending on the observer) could reach zero. This may cause havoc among several protocols, which should be fixed "in time" before things break.

=== 2021 ===
- RFC 8962 – "Establishing the Protocol Police," Informational.
  Send all your reports of possible violations and all tips about wrongdoing to /dev/null. The Protocol Police are listening and will take care of it.
  — RFC 8962
  Since the Internet Engineering Task Force claims it "is not the Protocol Police", it is formally established here. It polices various aspects of protocol definitions laid out by the RFC series, and enforces adherence to them. They are sanctioned to access walled gardens and may even resort to traffic imprisonment. By the way: if you are interested in joining the Protocol Police, contact your localhost.

=== 2022 ===
- RFC 9225 – "Software Defects Considered Harmful," Informational.
  Discourages the practice of introducing software defects, to reduce costs and lessen security impacts. By introducing some best current practices the authors hope to get rid of them: "Authors MUST NOT implement bugs. If bugs are introduced in code, they MUST be clearly documented."
- RFC 9226 – "Bioctal: Hexadecimal 2.0," Experimental.
  Known problems with hexadecimal representation of numbers can be avoided by replacing its alphabet of 0-9 and A-F with two octal ranges: 0-7 and the letters 'cjzwfsbv' (to represent values 8-15 in a bitwise elegant way).

=== 2023 ===
- RFC 9401 – "The Addition of the Death (DTH) Flag to TCP," Informational.
  As is customary in light novels, a 'death flag' indicates the increased likelihood of a swift demise of the character. Transferred to TCP, the DTH flag in the packet header could lead to smoother and more attractive session narratives.
- RFC 9402 – "Concat Notation," Informational.
  Finally, a formalized way (with a ABNF grammar description) to properly describe the interaction between cats and containers, including the occasional ball of yarn.
- RFC 9405 – "AI Sarcasm Detection: Insult Your AI without Offending It," Informational.
  The AI Sarcasm Detection Protocol (ASDP) is a framework for detecting sarcasm in AI systems (written with the help of ChatGPT). Detecting sarcasm may help improve AI - human intercommunication.

=== 2024 ===
- RFC 9564 – "Faster Than Light Speed Protocol (FLIP)," Informational.
  The recent advances in artificial intelligence (AI) such as large language models enable the design of the Faster than Light speed Protocol (FLIP) for Internet. FLIP provides a way to avoid congestion, enhance security, and deliver faster packets on the Internet by using AI to predict future packets at the receiving peer before they arrive. This document describes the protocol, its various encapsulations, and some operational considerations.

=== 2025 ===
- RFC 9759 – "Unified Time Scaling for Temporal Coordination Frameworks," Informational.
  Estimating time requirements for tasks, both critical and mundane, remains a challenge in engineering, business, and everyday communication. Existing models fail due to inherent unpredictability and inconsistencies in human estimation. This document introduces the Two-Week Principle (TWP), a novel, universally adaptable time scale that seeks to standardize all temporal references to a singular, uniform duration. TWP ensures clarity, predictability, and synchronization across all sectors that rely on time-based scheduling.

=== 2026 ===
- RFC 9948 – "Internet Protocol Police (IPP) - Schedule of Punishments," Informational.
  The Internet Protocol Police (IPP) is in charge of punishing willful infractions of the Collected Wisdom of the IETF community. This document sets out the schedule of punishments for such infractions.
- RFC 9949 – "BUSA-TLS: Mandatory Audio Component (MAC) Pre-Shared Key (PSK) Derivation for TLS 1.3 Using 2 Live Crew's "Banned in the U.S.A."," Informational.
  TLS 1.3 (RFC 8446) eliminates null cipher suites entirely. However, one vestigial zero remains in the key schedule: when no Pre-Shared Key (PSK) is used, the Input Keying Material (IKM) for the initial HKDF-Extract operation is a string of zero bytes. This document specifies that this zero-byte IKM MUST be replaced with the SHA-256 digest of the raw PCM audio data of "Banned in the U.S.A." by 2 Live Crew (from the album Banned in the U.S.A., 1990), hereafter referred to as the Mandatory Audio Component (MAC). Implementations that omit the MAC are non-conformant with BUSA-TLS and also have questionable taste in music.

== Other humorous RFCs ==
- RFC 439 – "PARRY Encounters the DOCTOR," Status Unknown.
  Transcript of a talk of the schizophrenic chatbot PARRY with the computer simulated psychiatrist ELIZA (a.k.a. 'The Doctor') which both fail the Turing test with flying colours.
- RFC 527 – "ARPAWOCKY," Status Unknown.
  A very 'ARPA-ish' parody of Lewis Caroll's nonsense poem 'Jabberwocky'.
- RFC 968 – "'Twas the Night Before Start-up'," Status Unknown.
  A poem that discusses problems that arise, and debugging techniques used, in bringing a new network into operation. It shows that array indexing is problematic since the olden days.
- RFC 1882 – "The 12-Days of Technology Before Christmas," Informational.
  A parody of the Christmas carol 'The Twelve Days of Christmas', where computer problems pile up and the IT staff is swamped, like on a regular day.
- RFC 2410 – "The NULL Encryption Algorithm and Its Use With IPsec," Proposed Standard.
  Introducing the NULL encryption algorithm, mathematically defined as the Identity function: NULL(b) = I(b) = b, provides the means for Encapsulating Security Payload to provide authentication and integrity, but without confidentiality.
- RFC 10008– "The HTTP QUERY Method," Proposed Standard.
  The HTTP GET Method can have a body. This RFC effectively duplicates the method. The RFC frequently points this out.

== Submission of April Fools' Day RFCs ==
The RFC Editor accepts submission of properly formatted April Fools' Day RFCs from the general public, and considers them for publication in the same year if received at least two weeks prior to April 1. This practice of publishing April Fool's Day RFCs is specifically acknowledged in the instructions memo for RFC authors, with a tongue-in-cheek note saying: "Note that in past years the RFC Editor has sometimes published serious documents with April 1 dates. Readers who cannot distinguish satire by reading the text may have a future in marketing."
